= Portuguese campaigns of pacification and occupation =

1880s–1910s Portuguese colonial campaigns

The Portuguese campaigns of pacification and occupation (Portuguese: Campanhas de pacificação e ocupação) were a vast set of military operations, conducted by the Portuguese Armed Forces in the overseas provinces of the Portuguese Empire, between 1838 and 1936. Action was seen at Chaimite, in Mozambique, where Mouzinho de Albuquerque captured the Vatua king Gungunhana but also at Môngua, in Angola. They resulted in the creation of modern-day Angola, Mozambique, Guinea-Bissau and Timor-Leste, which came to be known as the "Third Portuguese Empire".

These campaigns took place after the Independence of Brazil but mostly during the Scramble for Africa. Portugal sought to compensate for the loss of Brazil, but it was faced with a notorious lack of manpower and resources, native resistance and encroachment by rival European powers, not least of which by its own ally, the United Kingdom. On the other hand, it benefitted from the most familiarity with the colonial theater out of any Europeans, access to modern weaponry, severe hostility between native peoples, the erosion of native states and an exceptional level of native cooperation. The Portuguese ultimately secured over 2,000,000 square kilometers of territory, inhabited by about 8,000,000 people, even though the average number of soldiers stationed overseas never exceeded 13,000 men before 1910.

Though they began as early as 1838 under the aegis of the Marquis of Sá da Bandeira, the most important campaigns on Angola, Mozambique, Guinea and Timor took place between 1890 and 1909. Operations would continue for some years afterwards. The Gaza Empire in southern Mozambique was annexed in 1895 through a campaign organized by António Enes. The pacification of Zambezia followed between 1897 and 1902, culminating in the Barue campaign. The north was occupied between 1899 and 1917. Timor was occupied and pacified between 1894 and 1912. The occupation of Angola was carried out in the north, center and south, with the north being mostly occupied between 1886 and 1912, the center between 1890 and 1902, and the south between 1886 and 1915, though it was only pacified in 1926. Mainland Guinea was fully occupied by 1915, and the Bijagos in 1936, marking the end of the pacification campaigns.

At least 430 operations were carried out in Guinea, Angola and Mozambique between 1841 and 1936, totalling 557 months or 46 years on the field, involving a total of 58,000 soldiers and hundreds of thousands of African militiamen and auxiliaries. A further 56 campaigns were carried out on Timor between 1847 and 1913, involving 2,200 soldiers and about 114,000 Timorese militiamen and auxiliaries. Though numerous, the pacification campaigns were usually small in scale and involved mostly native troops. Relatively large expeditions of well-equipped European troops were dispatched directly from Europe whenever Portuguese sovereignty over the claimed territories was seriously contested. They were otherwise marked by the mass participation of native troops on the side of Portugal, which led some authors to comment that the new territories "conquered themselves".

== Background up to the Berlin Conference ==
Certain Portuguese proposed exploring the African hinterland between Angola and Mozambique to set up trade posts as early as 1795, when the English occupied the Cape Colony and the Boers began to move inland. Dr. Francisco de Lacerda, who proposed a chain of trade post across the interior, set out from Mozambique in 1798 to explore a path to Angola but died near Lake Mweru. The following decade, Pedro José Baptista and Amaro José plus a number of Afro-Portuguese traders set out from Angola and performed the first known crossing of Africa, reaching Mozambique.

After the Independence of Brazil and the end of the Portuguese Civil War, Portugal turned to its remaining overseas territories in Africa and Asia as a means to compensate for the loss of territory, trade, tax revenue, international prestige and ballooning debt. The devastation caused by the Napoleonic Wars, the civil-war, the scarcity of means and the political instability in Portugal made investment overseas controversial, however. Nevertheless, a consensus gradually formed among the Portuguese political elite on the potential of the colonies and the necessity to occupy the interior of Angola and Mozambique. Controversy arose from the way they ought to be administered, with some advocating for direct rule, other for greater autonomy and indirect British-style rule. Safeguarding them from foreign encroachment, namely from Britain and Germany, would also prove a major challenge until the end of World War I.

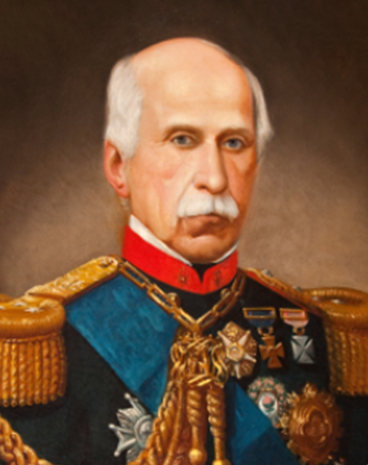
The Marquis of Sá da Bandeira, several times prime-minister of Portugal and major abolitionist.

The Marquis of Sá da Bandeira was a major abolitionist and defender of a market economy as a means to promote the development of Portuguese territories overseas. Sá da Bandeira was likened to William Wilberforce. Foreign diplomats held his integrity in high regard and the notable portuguese historian Alexandre Herculano dubbed him "the most illustrious Portuguese of our century". The Royal Geographical Society considered him "one of the most illustrious of our Honorary Corresponding Members".

A number of posts, forts and settlements would be established throughout the course of the 19th century, while peanut plantation was introduced in Guinea-Bissau. Expansion began as early as 1838 in Angola, with the annexation of the Calandula region east of Luanda in the aftermath of a conflict; it was renamed Duque de Bragança and fort São Pedro established there. Two new towns subsequently rose in the region, Santa Maria and Porto Novo.

In Mozambique, the migration of Zulus in the aftermath of the Mfecane and the establishment of the Gaza Empire blocked any advance inland. The Zambezi Wars broke out in 1840 between Portuguese landowners, African kinglets and the Portuguese government, after a catastrophic period of drought and Nguni invasion. Portuguese rule was extended to the far south of Angola in 1841, with the construction of fort São Fernando do Namibe on the Namibe Bay, following a treaty with a local ruler. The city of Moçâmedes was established nearby in 1849 by a number of Portuguese refugees who were resettled there after the Praieira Revolt sparked in Brazil. Governor António Sérgio de Sousa negotiated treaties with the lords of Huíla and Gambos but the latter was succeeded on the throne by a hostile king, which brought instability to the region until 1867.

Portuguese frontiersmen at the same time gradually ventured deeper into the African interior. Joaquim Rodrigues Graça for example crossed the interior of Angol a between 1846 and 1848 and reached the Lunda Empire, with which diplomatic and commercial ties were established. The Kingdom of Kasanje became an important middle-man between Lunda and Luanda but Portuguese merchant caravans were a frequent target for raids, which caused conflict and a new fort to be built at Malanje. 1852 saw the beginning of the notable explorations of the trader Francisco da Silva Porto, who cleared several geographical problems and was "invaluable as a counselor to more scientific explorers".

Portugal claimed the mouth of the Congo River and annexed Ambriz from the Kingdom of Kongo in 1855 as the territory was disputed by the British.

Portuguese policy until the 1870s was largely based on the export of agricultural products, mainly wine, import substitution under moderate protection and foreign loans for the construction of infra-structure. A global recession traditionally seen as having begun in 1873 hit Portugal especially hard however, and public revenue fell, deficit grew alarmingly, gold reserves dwindled, and the state could no longer service its foreign debt. This and the rising tide of the "scramble for Africa" compelled Portugal to invest in territorial acquisition overseas. As the crisis deepened, Portugal reacted like other states of western Europe, first protecting the home market, then seeking to extend it overseas.

=== The Bolama Question ===
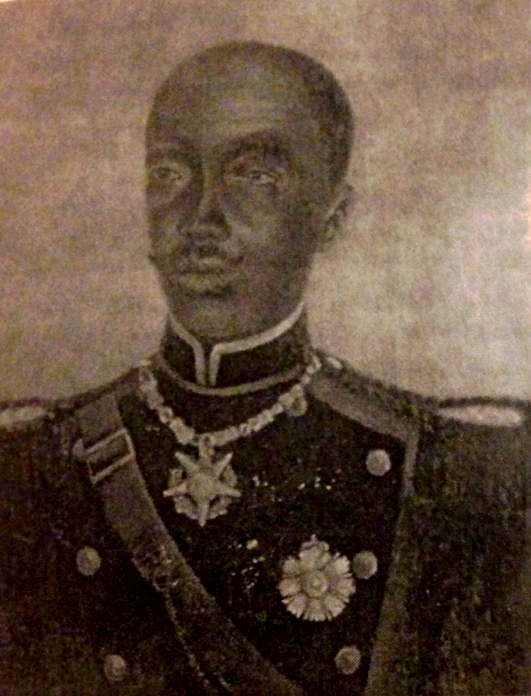
Honório Barreto played an important part consolidating Portuguese Guinea and resisting French and British encroachment as governor.

Portugal had established a presence in Guinea since the 15th century, but Britain claimed the Bolama Island from 1792 to 1870. British officer and entrepreneur Philip Beaver attempted to establish a colony on the island in 1792 but without the authorization of the Bijagós. The settlers were attacked and some were captured, being later ransomed at established slave prices. The attempt was abandoned after 18 months.

The Portuguese occupied Bolama in 1830 and the British government protested. To reinforce their claim, the brig Brisk was sent to Bolama in 1837, some men landed and replaced the Portuguese flags on the island for British ones. The Marquis António José de Ávila defended the rights of Portugal in the Portuguese parliament. He would be rewarded with the title Marquis of Ávila and Bolama for his efforts. The dispute raged on until Portugal and Britain eventually agreed to submit the issue to international arbitration. The newly elected US president Ulysses Grant was accepted as arbitror.

The Portuguese claims were delivered to Grant by Portuguese consul in New York António Pereira da Cunha Sotto Maior. After analysing the claims and arguments of both sides, Grant ruled in favor of Portugal on April 21, 1870, and the British withdrew their claims.

=== The Maputo Bay Question ===
The Great Trek had an impact on Portuguese affairs as well. Boers sought land and access to the sea in order to become independent from Britain and self-sufficient, and they reached the area around Maputo Bay in 1838. The small Portuguese settlement of Lourenço Marques was outside of direct British control and it grew out of trade with the South African Republic, but the difficult route to the port could only be solved by building a railway.

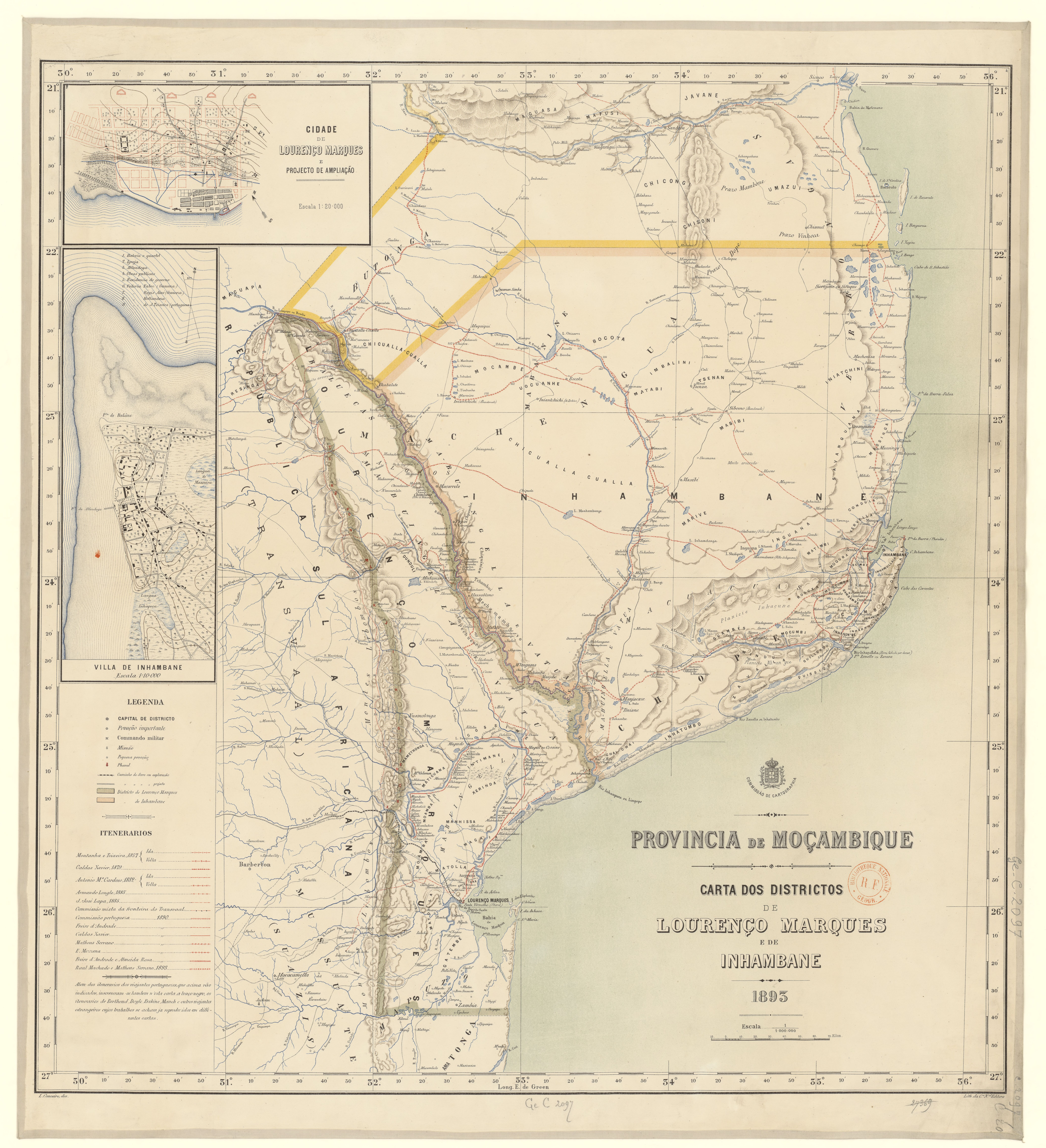
1893 Portuguese chart of southern Mozambique, including the districts of Lourenço Marques and Inhambane.

Maputo Bay was considered the finest harbour in East Africa and a railway to it would make any port established there the main one in southern Africa and one of the most important in the entire Indian Ocean. The bay would be called "The Key to South Africa". Its strategic value was not lost on the British and in 1861 the commander of H.M.S. Narcissus had the British flag hoisted on the territory and proclaimed it British. This however opened a dispute with Portugal, who already claimed the territory. Sá da Bandeira proposed submitting the issue to international arbitration, but the British government refused. In 1869 the Portuguese government signed a treaty with the South African Republic, through which the border was settled and in which Pretoria acknowledged Portuguese control of the bay along with the surrounding territory as far as the Lebombo Mountains. After Portugal concluded this agreement with the SAR, the British changed their stance and agreed to international arbitration. The British High Commissioner suggested purchasing the bay from Portugal but the British Secretary of State for the Colonies Lord Kimberley decided to proceed with international arbitration. Portuguese claims were presented by the jurist Levy Maria Jordão, Viscount Paiva Manso. The President of France Marshal Patrice Macmahon was chosen as arbitrator and on July 24, 1875, he ruled in favour of Portugal in what became known as "the Delagoa Bay Arbitration". He awarded all the land around Maputo Bay down to lat. 26º 30' S and inland towards the Lebombo, even more than the Portuguese had asked for.

In December of the same year as Macmahons arbitration, Portugal concluded an agreement with the South African Republic to establish a railroad between Pretoria and Lourenço Marques and a similar one was signed the following year with the Orange Free State, thus cementing Lourenço Marques as the natural port of the region and paving the way for its future prosperity.

Macmahons decision caused outrage in the British press as it was the third time in a row the United Kingdom had lost a case through arbitration but nonetheless it was upheld. After MacMahons arbitration, Britain and Portugal sought to jointly settle the future of south-east Africa but this project would be overtaken by events the following decade.

=== The Lisbon Geographic Society and exploration expeditions ===
As Europe developed an interest in Africa, Portugal realized action was imperative to defend Portuguese claims. The first step taken involved the creation of a "Permanent Central Geographical Commission" attached to the Ministry of the Navy and Overseas and the Lisbon Geographic Society, both in 1875.

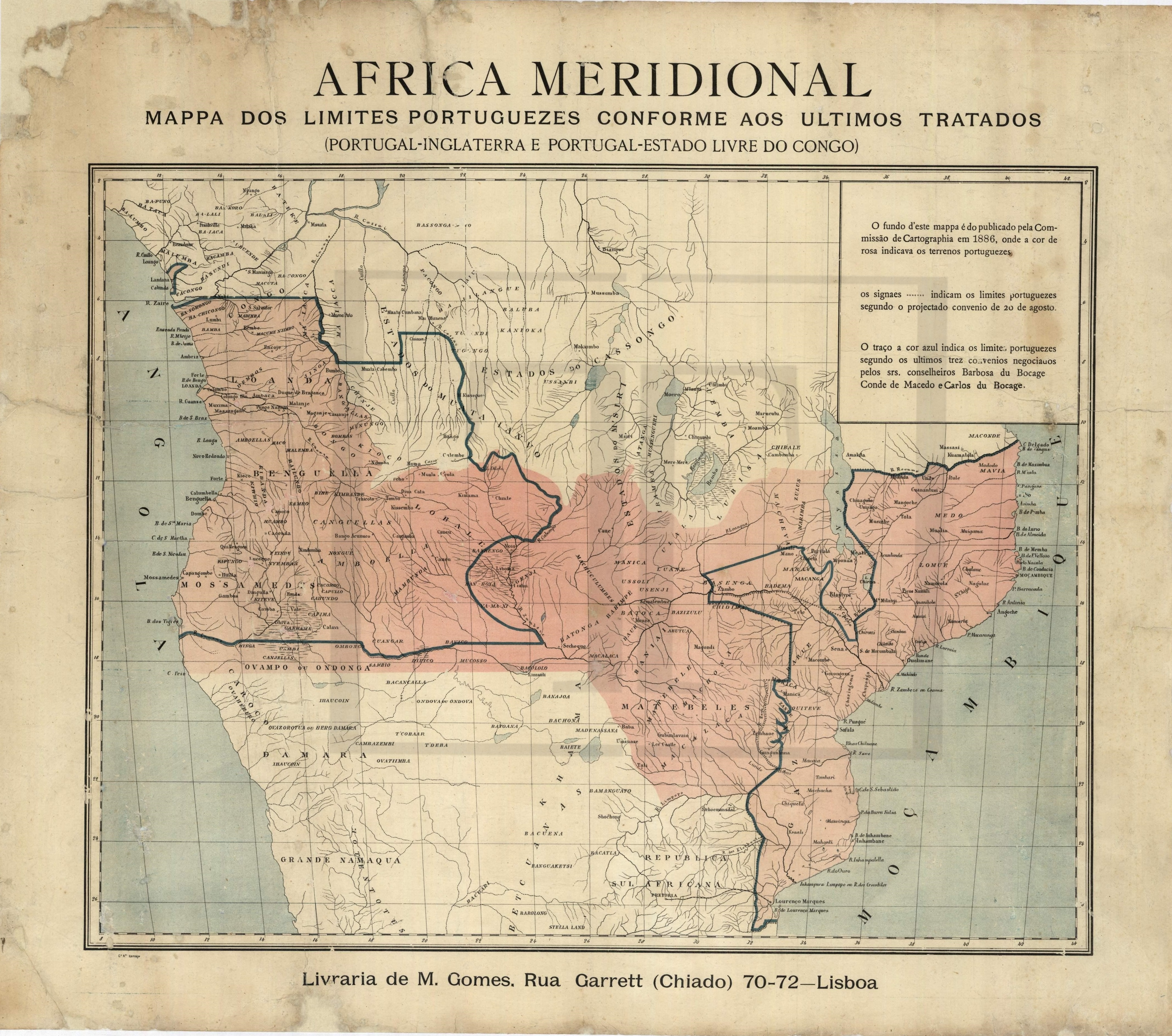
Portuguese claims in southern Africa as depicted in the Pink Map.

The Lisbon Geographic Society brought together explorers, scientists and officials knowledgeable about the African interior, published ethnographical and geographical knowledge, advised the government with studies and was a major promoter of greater Portuguese involvement in Africa. Most of its members were not academics but historians, newspapermen, colonial officials, businessmen and army or navy officers. The soul of the organization was Luciano Cordeiro, who devoted his life to the society and became its steadiest contributor until his death in 1900. The Society developed the África Meridional Portuguesa project, which called for the occupation of the territory between Angola and Mozambique and lead to several scientific expeditions in the region. It was illustrated in the Pink Map.

Soon after its creation, the Permanent Central Geographical Commission proposed a major exploration mission led by Serpa Pinto, Hermenegildo Capelo and Roberto Ivens in 1877. Serpa Pinto reached Pretoria on February 12, 1879, and was honored by his own government as well as foreign ones upon returning home. For the moment he was as renowned as Henry Morton Stanley and his book How I Crossed Africa was translated into English, French and German. Capelo and Ivens mapped a large part of Angola, established links with tribes hitherto outside Portuguese orbit and returned in 1880.

Henrique de Carvalho travelled to the Lunda Empire in 1884. Carvalho was a prolific write who later published a series of works on the history, ethnography and politics of Lunda, including a four-volume work, each 700 pages long, titled Descrição da Viagem à Mussumba do Muatiânvua but which has remained largely ignored outside of Portugal.

The same year that Carvalho left for Lunda, Capelo and Ivens departed on a celebrated journey across Africa from Moçâmedes in Angola to Quelimane in Mozambique through uncharted territory. In 1885, Serpa Pinto and Augusto Cardoso set out on an expedition to explore northern Mozambique and Lake Malawi.

=== Portugal and the Berlin Conference ===
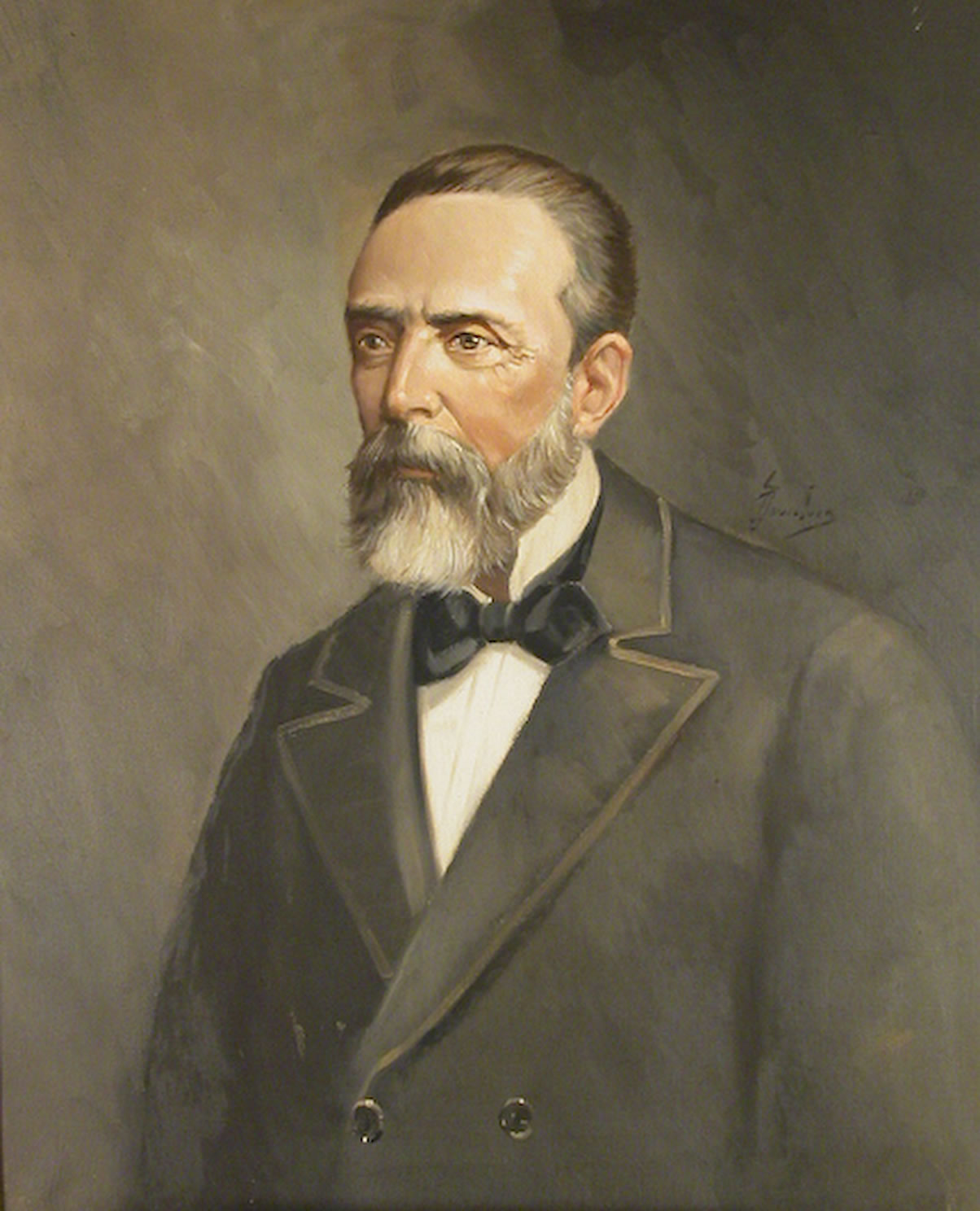
Renowned zoologist, geographer, co-founder of the Lisbon Geographic Society and foreign minister José Vicente Barbosa du Bocage, who proposed an international conference to settle the Congo issue.

Portugal had claimed the mouth of the Congo for decades but this was disputed by Britain. However, after the expeditions of Henry Morton Stanley and Brazza, international competition for the Congo increased. Portugal occupied Cabinda and Massabi north of the Congo in 1883. Britain recognized Portuguese claims in exchange for freedom of navigation, in a treaty signed on 26 February 1884. However no other European power accepted this, and so the Portuguese foreign minister José Vicente Barbosa du Bocage suggested an international conference to settle the dispute. António de Serpa Pimentel was then dispatched on a secret mission to London, Paris, Berlin and The Hague to promote it. The organization of the conference was taken up by Otto von Bismarck.

Portuguese delegates at the Berlin Conference were Luciano Cordeiro, António de Serpa Pimentel, António José da Serra Gomes, Carlos Roma du Bocage as military attaché, José Ferreira Pereira Felício and Manuel de Sousa Coutinho. Portugal based its claims on legal and historical arguments, which came to be known as the principle of "historic rights". This had been the normal procedure which had allowed Portugal to successfully settle a number of disputes favourably through diplomacy, like the Bolama Question and the Maputo Bay Question. Yet the remaining participants of the Berlin Conference favoured the principle of "effective occupation". Portugals main rivals were Bismarck and king Leopold II of Belgium.

Portugal found unexpected sympathy for its principle of "historic rights" among the newly independent countries of Latin America, which also did not fully control their own territories at the time, and considered the principle of "effective occupation" a threat. Though renowned as a champion of international non-interventionism, Argentinian jurist Carlos Calvo defended Portuguese rights at the Berlin Conference. The Mexican consul in Lisbon, Luis Bretan y Vedra wrote effusively that Portugal was "the most sympathetic among the other powers, because it is the most ancient, the most glorious, the vastest Metropole of the African Continent, which before History and civilisation no other power can humble its rights created more than four centuries ago by its illustrious son Diego Cano, intrepid discoverer of the Zaire". Brazil maintained an ambiguous stance between sympathy and wariness.

Portuguese chart of the Congo or Zaire.

The Portuguese government had refused to recognize the African International Association and was the last to do so, on 14 February 1885. In exchange, Portugal was recognized Cabinda and the left bank of the Congo as far as Noqui. It retained full control of the Zambezi and avoided it being declared an open and international waterway. The Berlin Conference caused meaningful changes in Portuguese policy as it brought Africa to the forefront of politics, and a sense of urgency set in as the doctrine of effective occupation suggested vigorous action. Afterwards the pace of European claims on African territory would increase.

== Mozambique ==
Portugal held a number of settlements in Mozambique, such as Beira, Sofala, Quelimane, Inhambane, Ibo, Mozambique Island, Tete, Sena, Zumbo, and Lourenço Marques, while a number of Tsonga kingdoms around Lourenço Marques were under a protectorate of the Portuguese Crown. The northern part of the territory was however coveted by Germany and the southern part by the United Kingdom. Throughout the 19th century, Portugal carefully balanced diplomacy between the two nations to throw them off of Mozambique.

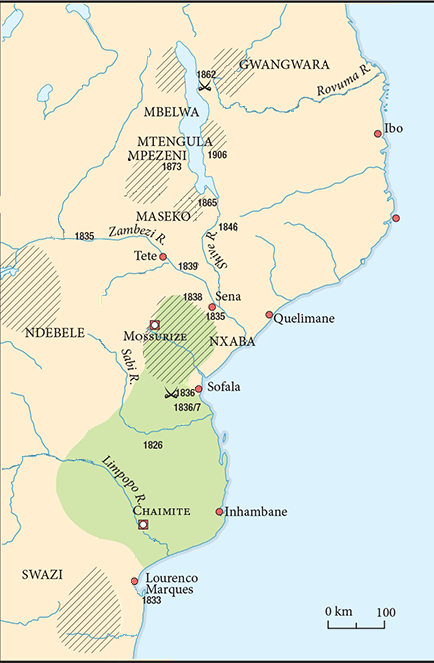
Mozambique on the eve of the annexation of Gaza.

To the north of Lourenço Marques laid the Gaza Empire, a Nguni state established by Shoshangane in the wake of the Mfecane. Its warriors fought in impi-like half-moon formations and they had subdued the native Chopi and Tonga through war or intermarriage. Although they were weaker than their forebears, they continued to evoke terror among their neighbours, including even the small Portuguese communities established along the coast. Its ruling clan, the Vátua, also sought to balance diplomacy between the Portuguese, British and Boers but Gungunhana favoured the British Empire. He had usurped the throne of Gaza from his half-brother and upon acceeding to the throne sought allies among the Swazi, the Matabele, but also the British and especially from Cecil Rhodes and his British South Africa Company against the Portuguese.

On 11 January 1890, the United Kingdom issued Portugal an Ultimatum, demanding that all Portuguese forces be withdrawn from the territory between Angola and Mozambique. In October 1890, Gungunhana scored his greatest diplomatical victory in granting a mining and railroad concession to Cecil Rhodes in exchange for a yearly subsidy and a supply of 1000 rifles. During the diplomatic hiatus that followed the Ultimatum, Cecil Rhodes took the opportunity to claim as much territory as he could for the British South Africa Company and on 15 November some of his troops occupied Massequesse, in an attempt to secure a corridor to the sea. On the 11th of May 1891, 100 Portuguese and 250 Africans clashed with British South Africa Company forces 3 km from Massequesse, by the river Chua. On 28 May 1891 however, Portugal and Britain signed a new treaty, which among other things recognized the Gaza Empire as in the Portuguese sphere of influence, and Rhodes was ordered to have his men withdraw from Massequesse.

The British Ultimatum nevertheless caused national outrage and a wave of patriotic sentiment swept the country. Portuguese authorities became suspicious of British activity and when a revolt broke out among the Tsonga kings in 1895, some suspected that it had been incited by Gungunhana at the behest of the British.

=== The conquest of the Gaza Empire ===
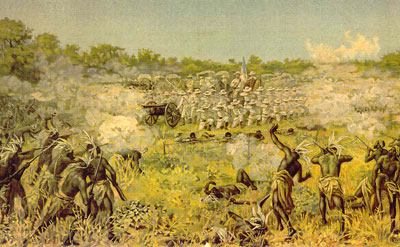
Battle of Coolela.

The Tsonga rebelled in 1894 under the leadership of king Matibejana of Mafumo, a son of Gungunhana. Lourenço Marques was attacked, but the revolt was quelled at the Battle of Marracuene in February 1895 and the Tsonga rebels fled to Gaza, where they were granted asylum by Gungunhana.

The Portuguese government decided to annex Gaza. The moment was apt, as the Vátuas were weakened by the revolt of their own subjects, epidemics and the emigration of their youth. Royal Commissioner António José Enes drew up a plan to subdue Gungunhana by having two columns converge on his capital of Manjacaze, one departing from Lourenço Marques, another from Inhambane. Gaza would be the first campaign of an era marked by the participation of high-ranking officers of the Portuguese Armed Forces that became known as "the Age of Centurions", and would last until 1909.

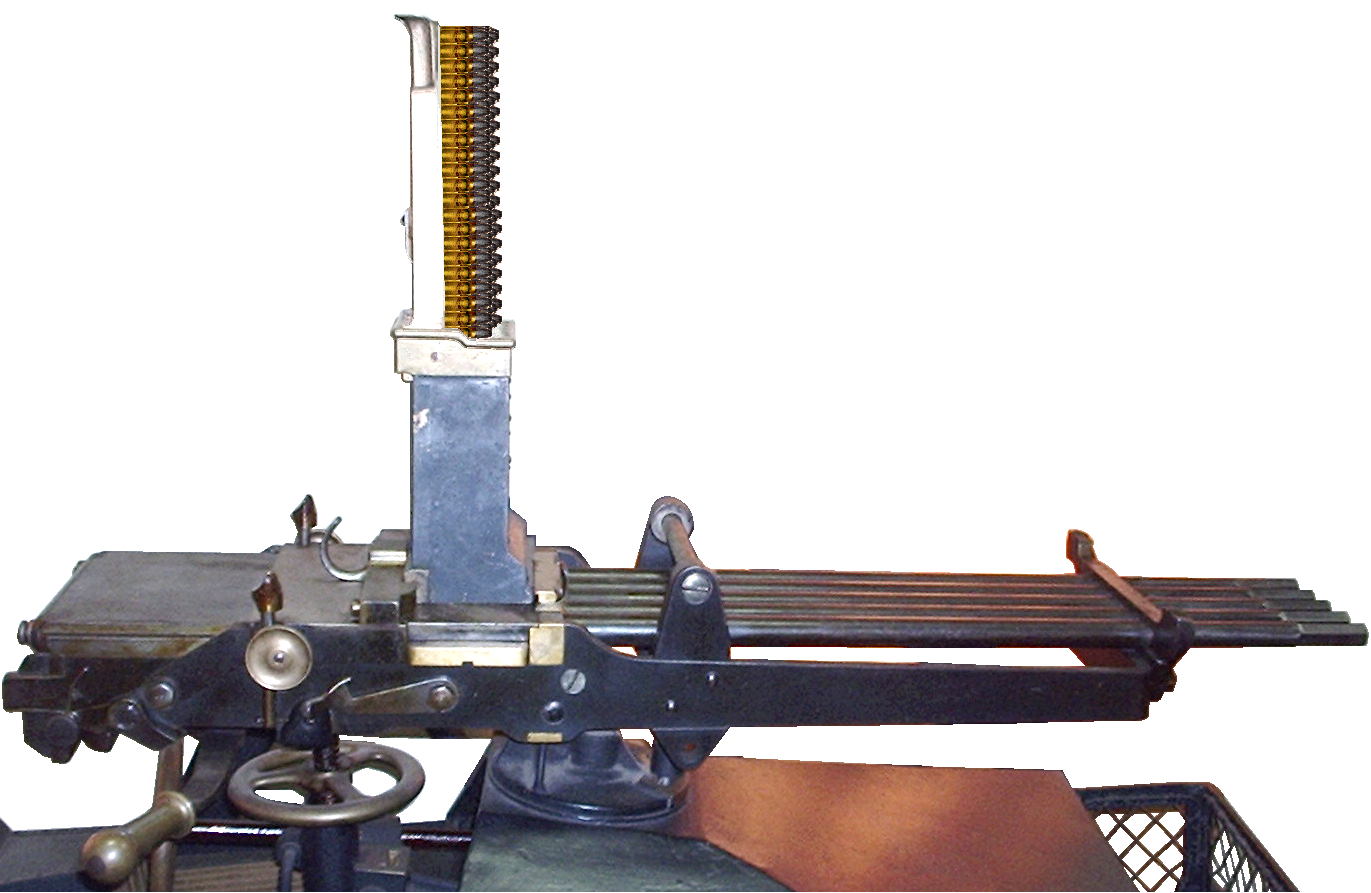
Multi-barrelled Nordenfelt gun, employed by the Portuguese before being replaced by Maxim guns.

At the Battle of Magul on 8 September, 600 Portuguese soldiers supported by two Nordenfelt machine guns were engaged by 6,000 warriors led by Maguiguana, most of them Tonga vassals of the Vatua. Warned in advance of the approach of the enemy by mounted scouts, the Portuguese had time to prepare and set up a fortified infantry square. The Nordenfelt guns jammed in mid-combat, but the warriors ultimately failed to breach through and withdrew after suffering hundreds of losses. In September 1895, as Portuguese troops manoeuvered closer to his kraal, Gungunhana dispatched emissaries to Pretoria, Natal and Cape Town in a last-ditch attempt to obtain some kind of protection or alliance, but they came back empty-handed. Till the end of his reign, Gungunhana "apparently believed that he could prevent the Portuguese conquest by bluffs, threats or by actually making an alliance with 'other whites'". After the Battle of Coolela on 7 November 1895, Mouzinho de Albuquerque advanced inland with a small body of men and on 28 December captured Gungunhana at Chaimite. The end of the Vátua empire was not unpopular among the subjects of Gungunhana, to whom they already owed tribute. Several military outposts were then established in the region and Gaza was incorporated into Mozambique as a district.

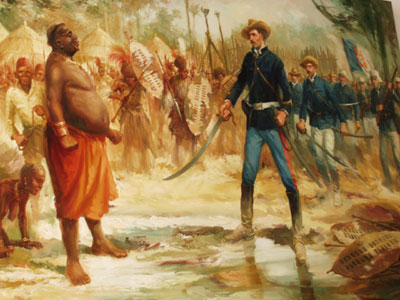
The capture of Gungunhana at Chaimite by Mouzinho de Albuquerque.

The defeat of Gungunhana surprised foreign observers, such as the Americans and the British, whose consul Sir Hugh MacDonnell at first refused to believe that Gungunhana had been beaten. Although logistics had been lacking, the morale of Portuguese troops was high, they were equipped with the Kropatschek magazine rifle that was one of the best for use in Africa, Portugal had allies who would provide them with war-material and more importantly Enes had unanimous backing from home in his venture. It was the most famous of the pacification campaigns and the largest sent overseas by Portugal since the independence of Brazil.

The king of Maputo had agreed to participate in the campaign with his warriors in exchange for a large supply of modern rifles but after receiving the weapons he deserted. Once Gaza was annexed and most of the Portuguese troops had returned home, the king turned hostile and threatened the Catholic missionaries in his kingdom. At the behest of governor-general Joaquim da Graça therefore, Mouzinho de Albuquerque annexed the territory in the Maputo campaign in 1896.

Mouzinho de Albuquerque was appointed governor-general that same year and he sought to annex and tax the Swahili and Makua states in northern Mozambique, but this met the opposition of almost all Makua kings, the Swahili sultans and even some Portuguese merchants. A few forts were established along the coast and a campaign was launched against the Namarrais in October 1896, but this tribe proved skillful at guerrilla warfare and operations were suspended in March 1897 once a revolt broke out in Gaza, which forced Mouzinho de Albuquerque to divert his forces south to deal with the threat.

The years following the Gaza campaign had been marked by drought and disease in the region. A revolt in Gaza was led by Maguiguana in an attempt to restore Vatua power but he was defeated at the Second Battle of Macontene in July 1897.

=== The pacification of Zambezia ===
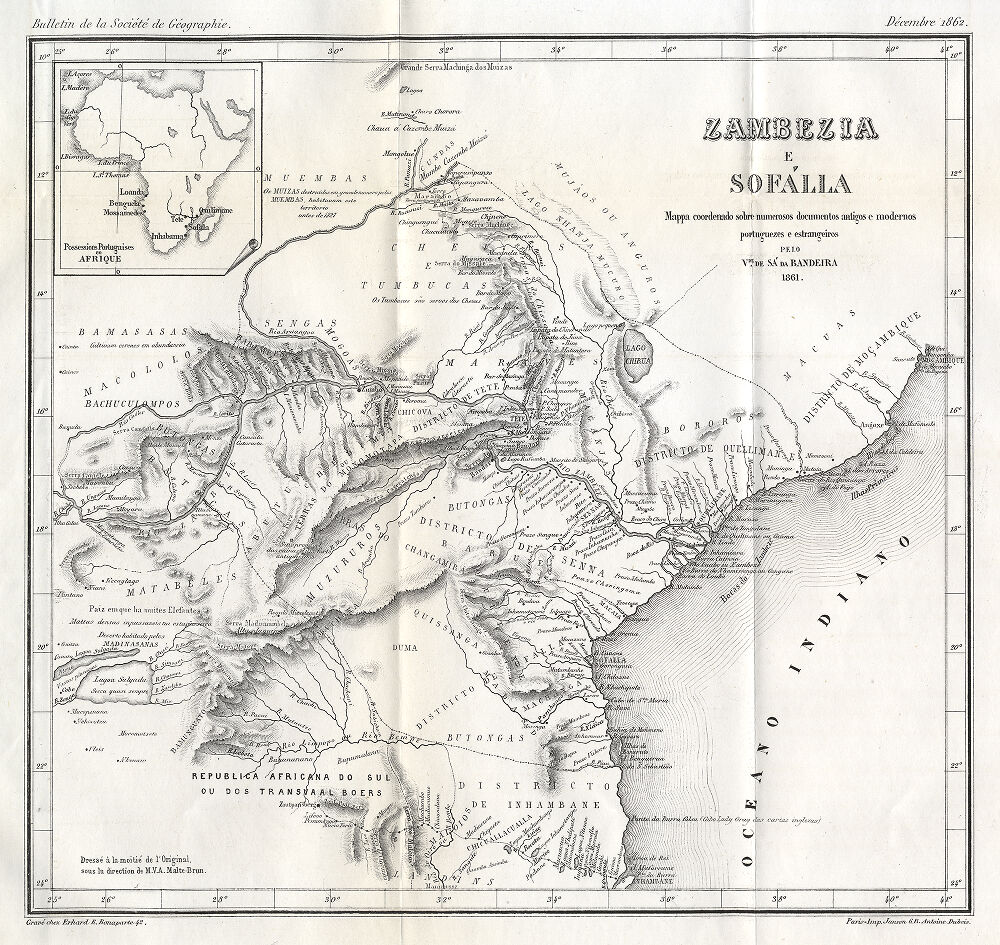
Map of Zambezia and Sofala, compiled by Sá da Bandeira in 1861.

Once Gaza was occupied, Portugal focused on pacifying the Zambezi valley, where the Zambezi Wars had been going on for some decades already between African kinglets, warlords or bandits, Afro-Portuguese landowners and the Portuguese government. Unlike Gaza however, the region was fragmented into a multitude of small states and the geography favored guerrilla, hence its pacification required numerous small campaigns and was much more difficult. Resistance in the Zambezi valley at first was taken up by rogue Afro-Portuguese prazeiros, seventeenth-century creations of the Portuguese Crown whose ruling families had "gone native".

The state of war that has almost become chronic in Zambezia is the main reason for the backwardness of that region and for the difficulties which the metropolitan government and the local government have found in advancing and developing that vast territory.

The Portuguese government employed few regular army soldiers in the Zambezi valley and relied mainly on sipaios (African gendarmes) to pacify the region. The sipaios were an African militia created in 1892 to integrate former slaves or chikunda, and to establish control over the interior, as Lisbon was by that point focused elsewhere. They knew the terrain and were immune to malaria, which ravaged European troops. Gunboats sailing up the river would also play an important part. Deep-rooted animosity between the various peoples of Zambezia prevented a united front, while some actively supported the Portuguese in exchange for protection against enemy raids and banditry. Portugal further benefitted from the allegiance of powerful prazeiros, chief among them Manuel António de Sousa, who also held the rank of captain-major in the Portuguese colonial army.

In the far western hinterland of Mozambique around Zumbo, the Afro-Portuguese warlords Kanyemba and Matakenya had established a number of stockades from which they raided and extracted tribute from the surrounding tribes with their bands of chikunda followers, however both the warriors as well as the peasantry were subject to brutal treatment, afforded little compensation and ruled largely by fear, which led to resentment, defection and revolt. When Matakenya began attacking allies tribes of Portugal, the government intervened against him. Squeezed between the Portuguese and the British, Matakenya drew together a smal number of Nsenga, Chewa and Tawara chieftaincies and other small minor warlords into a coalition, but with his death in 1893 the alliance fell apart.

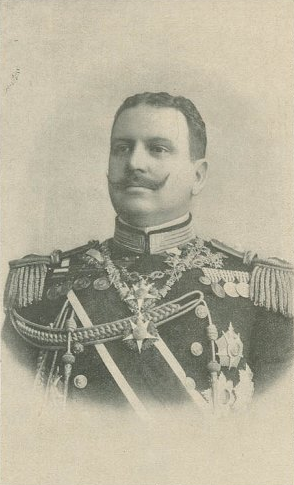
João de Azevedo Coutinho.

The hinterland of Massingire had fallen under the control of the rebel leader Marenga since 1887. He had allied with the Makololo and together they raided isolated Portuguese plantations, outposts and warehouses in the regions of Cheringoma and Gorongosa. In 1891 they received support from Maganja da Costa, an independent republic notable for the sophisticated organization of its troops. Portuguese authorities worried that Marengas activities might cause a widespread revolt in the north bank of the Zambezi. When Manuel António de Sousa perished in combat the following year, a great number of sipaios in his service defected, led by Sousas captains, chief among them Cambuemba. They established themselves as independent warlords across Gorongosa and the Zambezi valley and they commanded numerous stockades from which they raided the surrounding territory and extracted tribute from the peasantry, but they proved unable to find common ground among themselves or with neighbouring kings. Mozambique experienced a level of banditry it had not seen since the great drought in the 1820s, and anarchy prevailed for the next five years. It became increasingly clear that stabilizing the region would require assertion by the central authority, and João de Azevedo Coutinho was commissioned to carry out that task. He was one of the most effective officials to serve in Mozambique and by June 1897 he had cleared the valley of bandit stockades loyal to Cambuemba with an army recruited north of the Zambezi.

In 1898, Coutinho led a campaign against Maganja da Costa with over 6000 men, the vast majority of them sipaios and auxiliaries. The republic capitulated and it was annexed on 17 June 1898. It was the last of the former Crown prazos to be pacified. Massingire was fully pacified on the occasion.

The Second Anglo-Boer War broke out in 1899, while the pacification of Zambezia was ongoing. Public opinion in Portugal favoured the Boers highly due to the British ultimatum nine years prior, but the Portuguese government avoided hostilizing the United Kingdom and instead took the opportunity to reaffirm the Anglo-Portuguese alliance through the signing of a new Treaty of Windsor, by which the British recognized Portuguese claims and reaffirmed its pledge to help defend Portugal as well as its overseas empire against all enemies "future and present", in exchange for aid against the Boers. During the hostilities, 800-900 Boers crossed into Mozambique to seek refuge, but they were arrested and transported to Caldas da Rainha in Portugal, where they were kept until the end of the war. Yet the Boers were treated reasonably well and their relationship with the Portuguese authorities and population was cordial, with Boer C. Plokhooy writing that "life at Caldas da Rainha is certainly becoming pleasant, and who dares grumble about it grumbles without cause".

Elsewhere in 1899 still, navy officer António Júlio de Brito led a small expedition that succeeded in annexing the kingdom of Angónia, which was experiencing a succession crisis at the time. Brito was elected king by its inhabitants on the occasion, and between March and May 1902 he led over 290 sipaios and 3000 nguni warriors on a campaign against the kingdom of Macanga, which was also annexed.

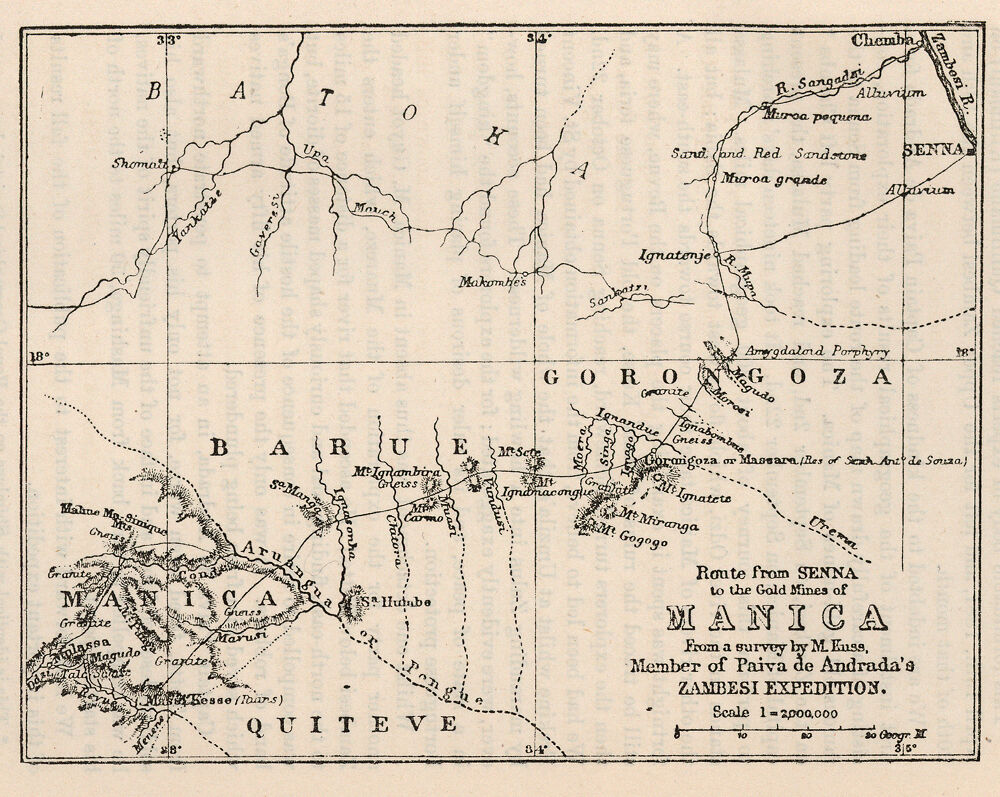
Barue, between Gorongosa and Manica.

The Kingdom of Barue was at the center of anti-Portuguese activity in Mozambique and its king actively supplied African rebels with weapons and troops, while the alliances he cultivated threatened Portuguese sovereignty over the Zambezi valley. It was located on the border with Rhodesia and therefore of strategic importance. Coutinho organized a campaign involving 1000 soldiers, of which 500 were drawn from the metropolitan army, and 15,000 sipaios. The conquest of Barue in 1902 was Portugals most well organized campaign in Mozambique and the biggest in Zambezia. Modern weaponry such as Maxim guns allowed the Portuguese to secure the territory in three months. The Portuguese navy was particularly important for the transportation of men, animals, machinery and provisioning to advanced posts inland, whilst protecting the rear lines.

Two hundred kilometers west of Tete, José Rosário de Andrade, better known as Kanyemba ("the ferocious") had built a stockade from which he had raided the surrounding countryside since the 1870s, with a force estimated at 1000 rogue chikunda. After Andrade died in the late 19th century, the Portuguese defeated his forces and pacified the region in 1903.

=== The occupation of northern Mozambique ===
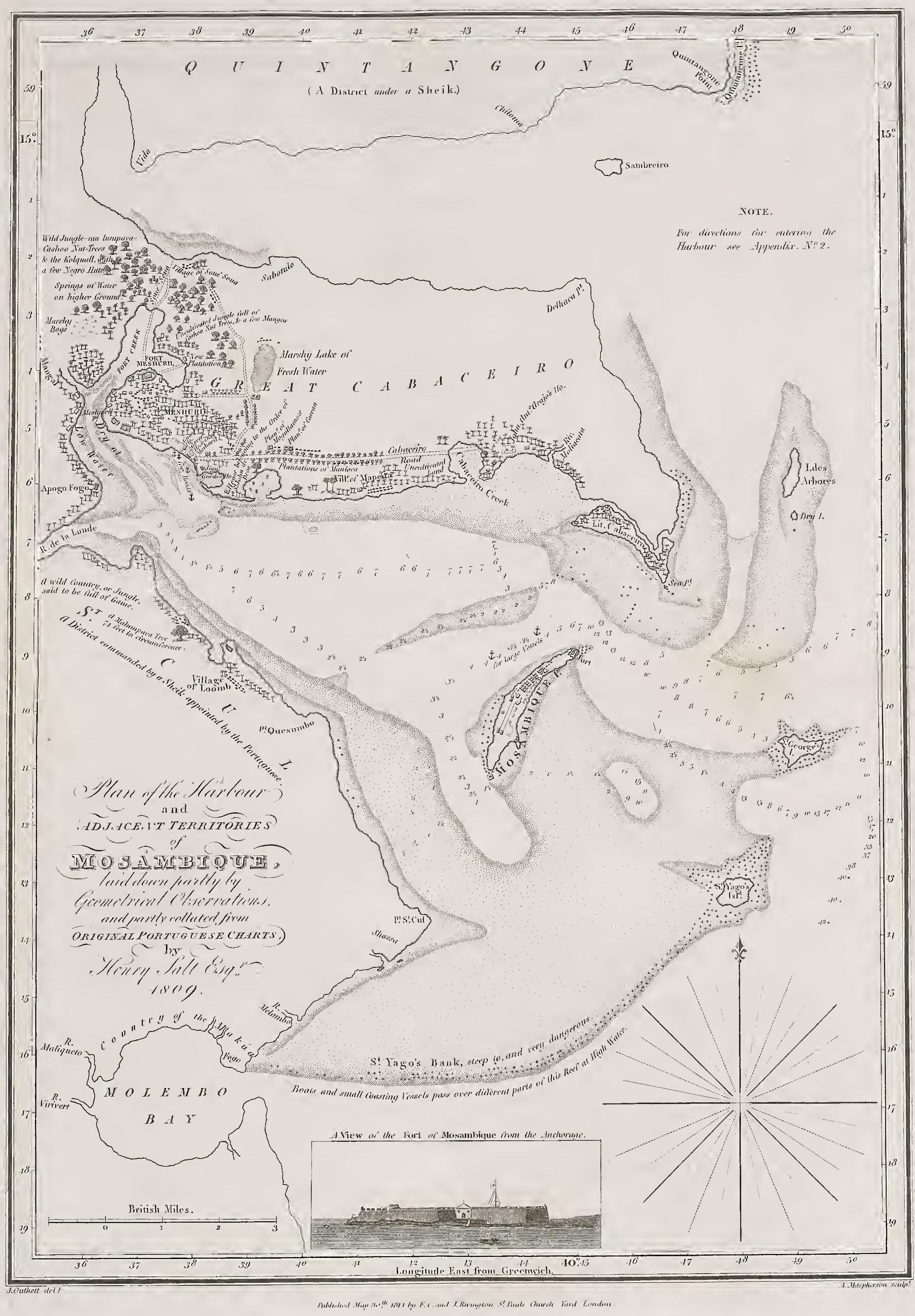
Chart of Mozambique Island harbour and surrounding inlets.

The occupation of northern Mozambique was also slow and difficult. Opposition was organized by a narrow class which continued to engage in the slave trade and feared for its position should Portuguese rule be established. Portugal faced a coalition of peoples that included the Swahili states on the coast, allied to Macua kings, to resist Portuguese expansionism and preserve the slave trade. The Yao were also well-armed, notoriously involved in the slave trade and prepared to wage a guerrilla war. King Nyambi of the Mataka dynasty ruled the Yao with an iron fist until c. 1879 and the forays he conducted on neighbours involved the razing and burning villages and the mutilation and killing of enemies. The Mataka dynasty sponsored slave caravans over a thousand men strong into the 1890 and provoked a succession of Portuguese military campaigns in the region. The Portuguese would find ready allies in other Macua kings that hoped to bring an end to the slaving that depopulated the region.

Portugal held the settlements of the Island of Mozambique, Mossuril, Cabaceira, Natule, Parapato, Sangage, Mogincual and Infusse along the northern coast. The Gaza campaign had brought ambitious officials and more European regulars to the territory, which despite their small number was a notable development. Even so, the occupation of the region would rely heavily on African sipaios and auxiliaries. Deficient logistics in this theater caused great losses on European troops due to gastrointestinal diseases and poor sanitary conditions, which modern medicine proved insufficient to prevent.

==== The occupation of the Mozambique District ====
Although Portugal held the important settlement of Mozambique Island in the region for centuries, the interior remained independent. The coast was in the hands of Swahili rulers who engaged in the slave trade, the most important of which was the Sultante of Angoche. It had close relations with the Sultanate of Zanzibar. The occupation of the Mozambique District began in earnest during the tenure of Mouzinho de Albuquerque, who established a number of posts along the coast and led a campaign against the Namarrais in 1897. Progress was slow in the following years however.

Portugals main enemy south of the Lúrio River was the Sultanate of Angoche, an important slaving centre that resisted the ban on the trafficking of people. Farelay, a powerful member of the royal family, forged numerous alliances with local Macua kings to attack Portuguese territory and preserve the slave trade, from which he derived major profits. Mossuril was attacked in 1904, and the following year Portuguese columns began to systematically march into the hinterland, entering by way of the rivers.

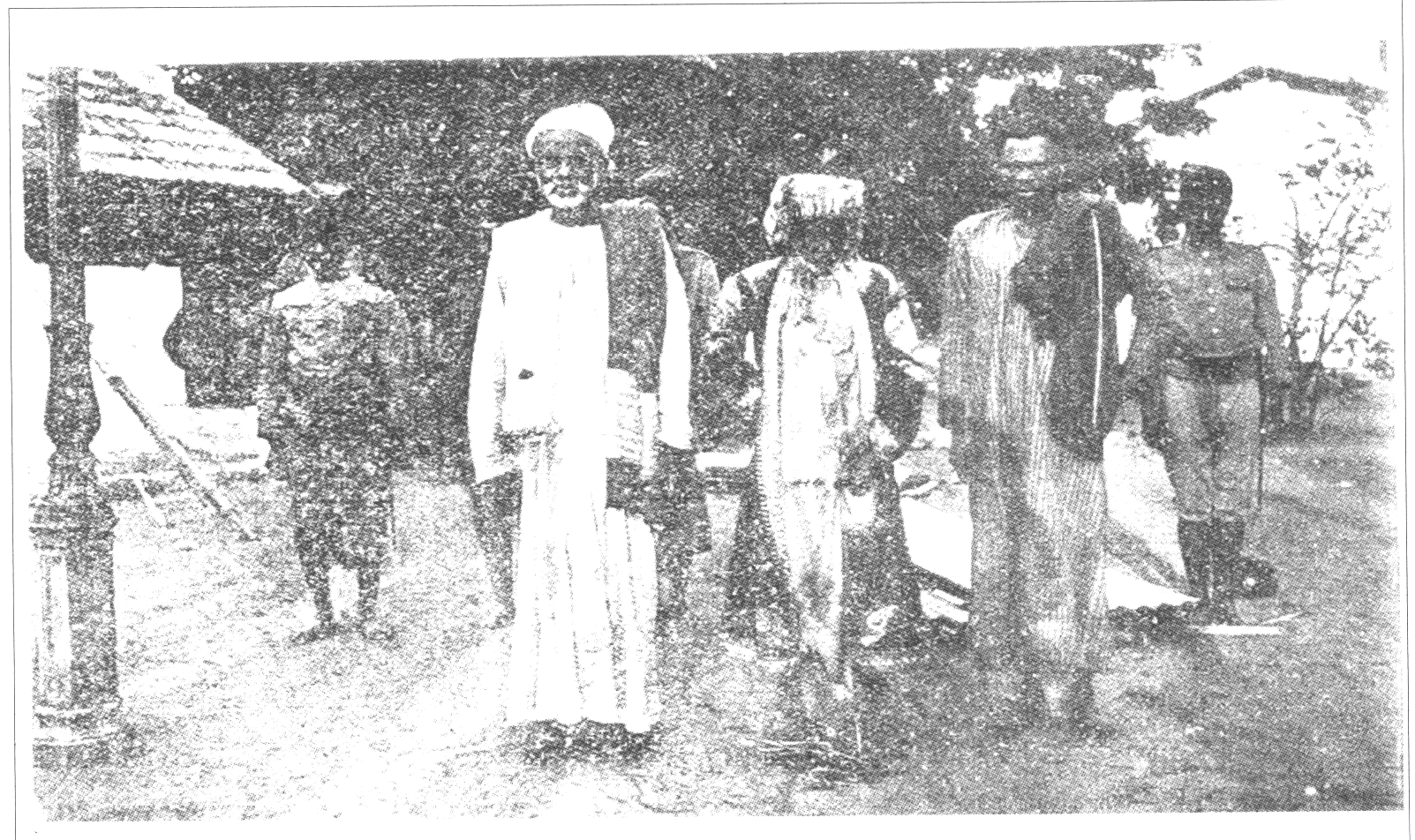
Sultan Ibrahim, Farelay and king Cobula-Muno.

The district would only be systematically occupied by Pedro Massano de Amorim, starting in 1906. That year, Marave, the most important chief of the Namarrais was defeated, and the following year all main rulers of the coastal region submitted. Angoche was conquered in 1910 and Farelay was arrested, along with Sultan Ibrahimo and king Guernea-Muno. After the capture of Angoche, at least 87 Macua lords recognised Portuguese sovereignty. From then on, Portuguese troops began to receive help from Macua lords who resisted Swahili slavers.

Once the Muslim rulers of the coast had been neutralized, little resistance was put up by inland lords. In the final stages of the pacification of the north, resistance among the Macua appears to have lacked popular backing and dissident rulers were completely isolated before being captured. The Namarrais were fully pacified by the Portuguese in 1913 through a series of alliances forged with neighbouring tribes, and this year the region between the Zambezi and the Lúrio was declared pacified.

==== The occupation of the Cabo Delgado and Niassa districts ====
In the far north of Mozambique, Portugal held the Island of Ibo and a number of military outposts established along the coast between Ibo and Cape Delgado. The interior was held by Makua, Makonde and Yao tribes.

The region between the Lúrio and the Ruvuma River had been leased to the Niassa Company in 1891. However, the Yao Mataka Bonomali blocked access from the sea to Lake Malawi and attacked Nyasaland, which led to complaints in Lisbon in 1899. Fearing for British military intervention in the region, the Portuguese government had a major campaign launched. 312 regulars and 2,800 sipaios marched against Bonomali between 10 June and 21 November 1899. The sipaios and local auxiliaries fought effectively, but Bonomali avoided capture and adopted guerrilla warfare. In 1900, the Portuguese occupied Metarica and founded Fort Dom Luís Filipe. In 1901, Mataka Bonomali attacked the lands of the lords who had accepted Portuguese authority.

Mataka Bonomali passed in 1903 and was succeeded by Mataka Mkwepu, who was less warlike. Nevertheless, that same year king Metarica, a firm ally of the Portuguese, died and his successor attacked fort Dom Luís Filipe in conjunction with the new Mataka. Mkwepu ruled only for two years and he was in turn succeeded by Mataka Chisonga, who was not respected.

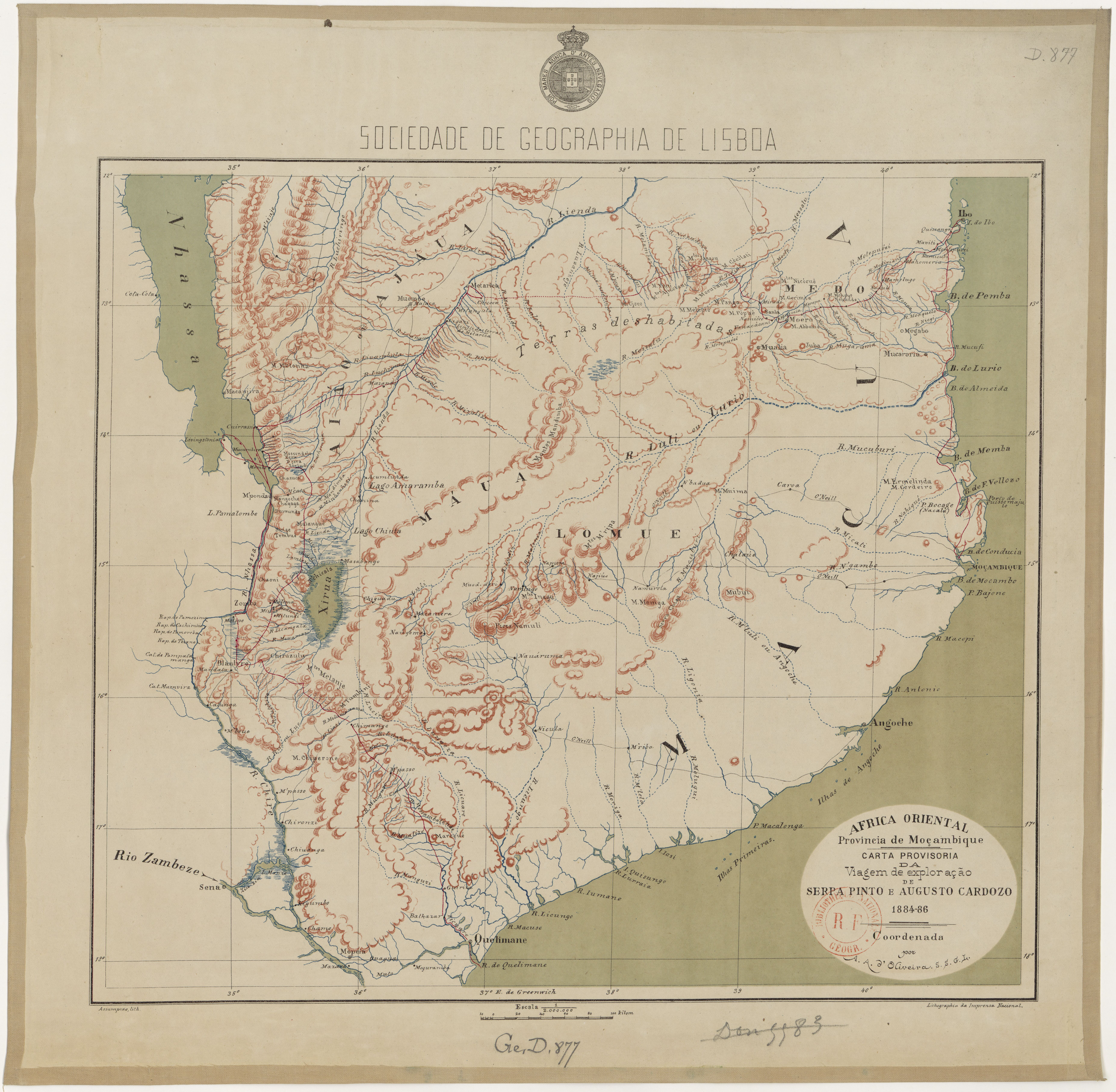
19th century Portuguese map of northern Mozambique.

In 1908 a South African consortium took over the Niassa Company, and now provided with considerable funds, the company could launch a new attempt at securing the interior. For the next four years lines of posts were extended to the north and south of Matakas territory. The effective occupation of the interior was concluded between 1908 and 1912. The Macua and Makonde tribes between the Mogabo and Messalo rivers were pacified between 1909 and 1910. In 1910, the Yao of Macaloe were pacified.

Chisonga was the strongest of all Yao chiefs and his influence extended from the Luambula up to the Rovuma, on the other side of which he owned an important stretch of land near Sasavara, and he was said to have smuggled large quantities of gunpowder and firearms from German East Africa with the collusion of German authorities. The first step taken to neutralize Chisonga involved the establishment of a string of posts in the north along the Rovuma, which was carried out in two small expeditions between 1910 and 1911. In Autumn 1912 a large expedition was launched against Chisonga, which succeeded in entering his capital Mwembe with little resistance. Fort Valadim was built there and the whole region between Lujenda and Lake Malawi pacified. Chisonga fled to German East Africa with 45,000 followers. The Niassa Company then began to administer Niassa. A number of Makonde tribes still eluded Company control on the Mueda Plateau however.

The outbreak of World War I pitted the Portuguese against the Germans on opposite sides of the Rovuma and led to the dispatch of new contingents of soldiers to the territory. Portugal occupied the Kionga Triangle on 10 April 1916 and the Mueda Plateau between April and July 1917, with a force of 2,000 Makua auxiliaries, in the Mueda Campaign. Also in 1917, the Barue uprising took place and while it lasted, the Germans invaded Mozambique with 300 soldiers and 1,700 askari, which prompted some Yao and Makua lords to revolt as well, but once the Germans withdrew, the Portuguese pacified the territory.

Portugal is estimated to have invested more than 7,000 European soldiers, 9,000 African soldiers, 74,000 sipaios and 100,000 allied native warriors in the occupation of Mozambique from 1854 until World War I, the troops of African origin accounting for 95% or more of the total, which lead some authors to comment that "Mozambique conquered itself".

== Angola ==
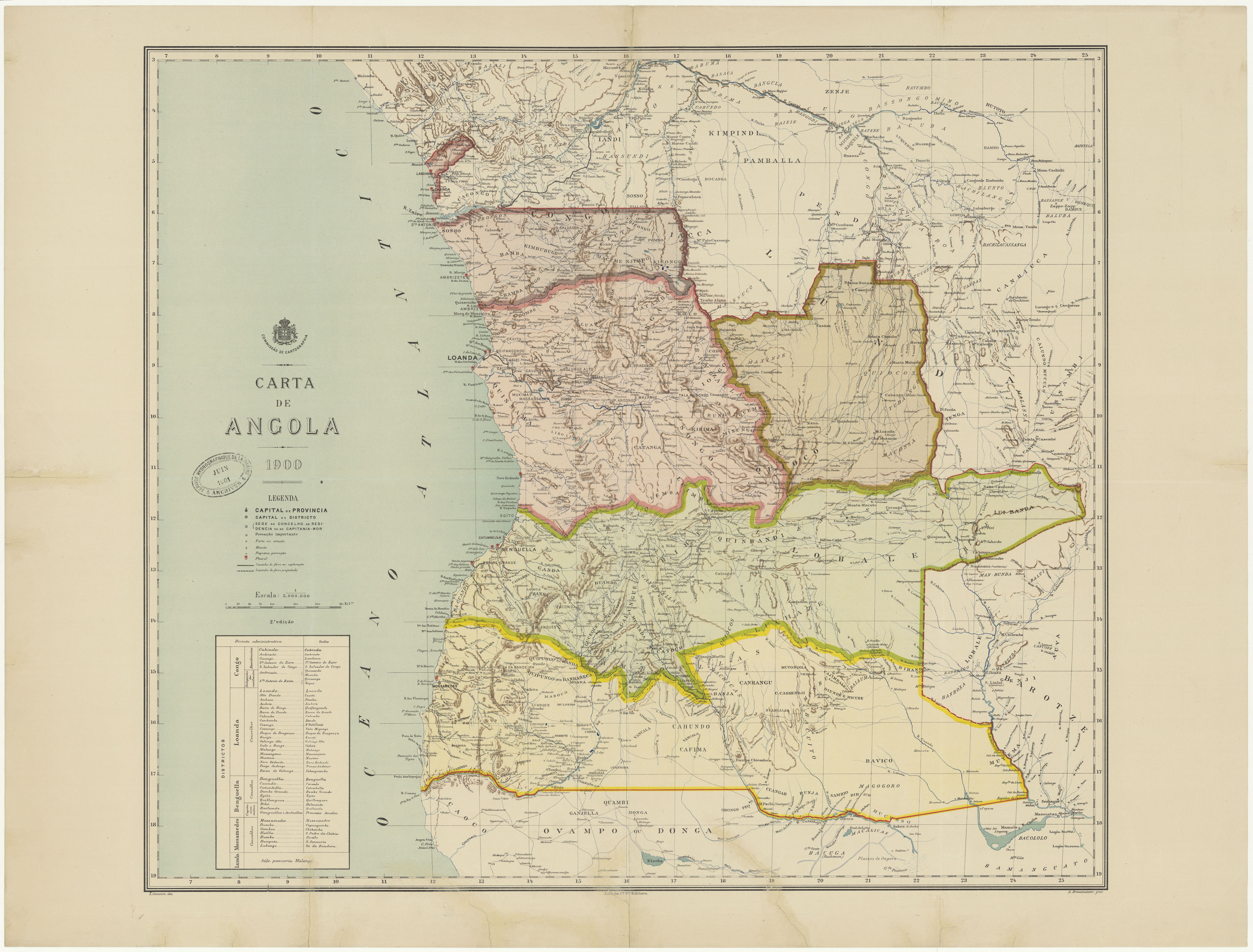
Portuguese chart of Angola in 1900.

Angola had always been the focus of greater attention and investment by the Portuguese government than any other territory in Africa. At the time of the Berlin Conference, Portuguese rule extended to Ambriz to the north, Cabo Negro to the south, and Pungo Andongo in the east. In the interior, African kings were linked to it through trade and diplomatic relations but they were otherwise independent. Until the construction of the Suez canal and the development of the mining sector in southern Africa, Angola was much closer to world markets and better served by shipping than Mozambique. It remained the "crown jewel" of Portugal, with larger revenues than any other colony. It remained essentially a trading colony based on the three port cities of Luanda, Benguela and Moçâmedes until the 19th century.

Portuguese activity in Angola was concentrated in and around Luanda, Benguela and Moçâmedes, and along the north bank of the Cuanza. Its population was about 400,000 people, of which only 2,000 were whites.

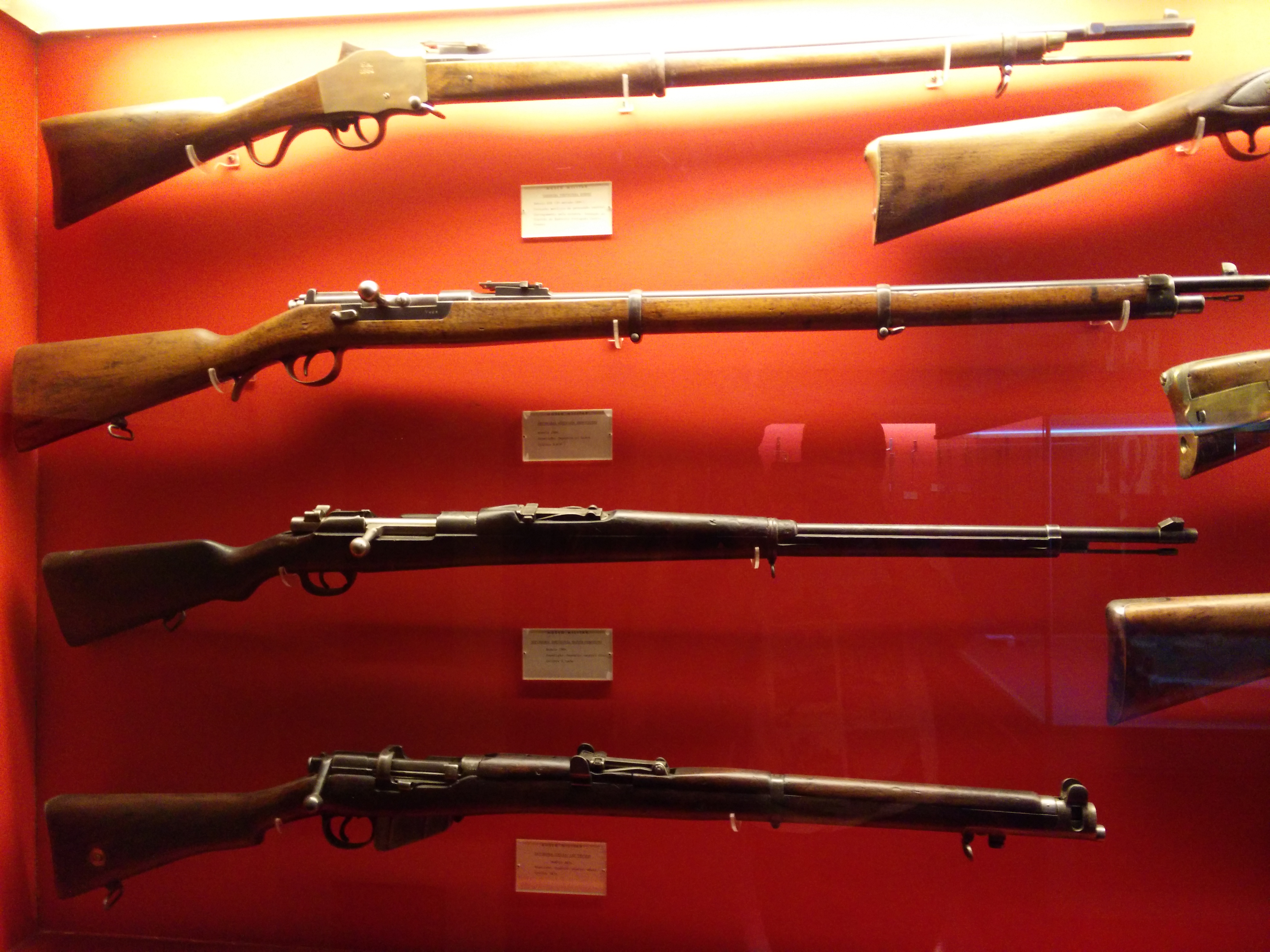
Portuguese-designed rifles (Guedes) or used by Portugal during the pacification campaigns and World War One (Kropatshek M1886, Mauser–Vergueiro, Lee-Enfield SMLE MK III) on display at the Lisbon Military Museum.

Portuguese forces in Angola were divided in a first line of professional European or African soldiers, a second line of European, African or mestiços militiamen, and auxiliary warriors provided by allied or vassal kings. Portuguese policy favoured the use of African troops, the officers being Europeans or mestiços. As service in Angola was unattractive due to high mortality, low pay and long service times, European officers remained in short supply, while some African groups not only remained loyal to Portuguese authorities but acquired a reputation for talent in bush warfare, so positions in the army were opened up to Africans even before 1700. At least two Africans or mestiços reached the rank of colonel by the 19th century, while Geraldo António Victor, known as Quinjango ("scimitar"), became a general of the first-line Angolan army and was regarded as a hero of the 1870s campaigns in Angola and Guinea.

The composition of the army was diverse but its roles were clear: uphold Portuguese sovereignty, defend Portuguese settlements, aid allied African chiefs against their enemies and suppress rebellions. There was scarcely a year in which a campaign was not carried out in Angola for centuries since 1575. Governor-General Sebastião Lopes de Calheiros e Meneses wrote that:

...the normal condition of the administration of this colony is to make war, and to prepare itself for war.

— Governor-General S. Calheiros e Menezes

Many great African states in Angola showed signs of erosion already by the early 19th century but by 1885 disintegration was widespread. Kongo retained great prestige and ritual importance but actual power gradually passed to provincial chiefs, who partook in the expanding trade of the Congo estuary and were effectively independent. Kasanje was a hollow shell with power in the hands of lineage elders, while further east the Lunda empire was rapidly dissolving. In the south, the kingdom of Humbe was greatly reduced and threatened by the rising power of the Ovambo. Political fragmentation sometimes allowed the rise of groups able to resist the Portuguese more effectively than the centralized powers they replaced however, such as the Dembos and the Chokwe. Chokwe tribes raided for slaves, hunted ivory, and harvested natural rubber, which they traded for modern firearms. They overthrew the Lunda Empire and spread out over eastern Angola. Chokwe expansion across eastern Angola "brought a train of violence and disorder into a previously relatively stable region" as they were armed with guns while their neighbours were not. The Portuguese found it challenging to subdue this elusive foe due to their decentralized nature.

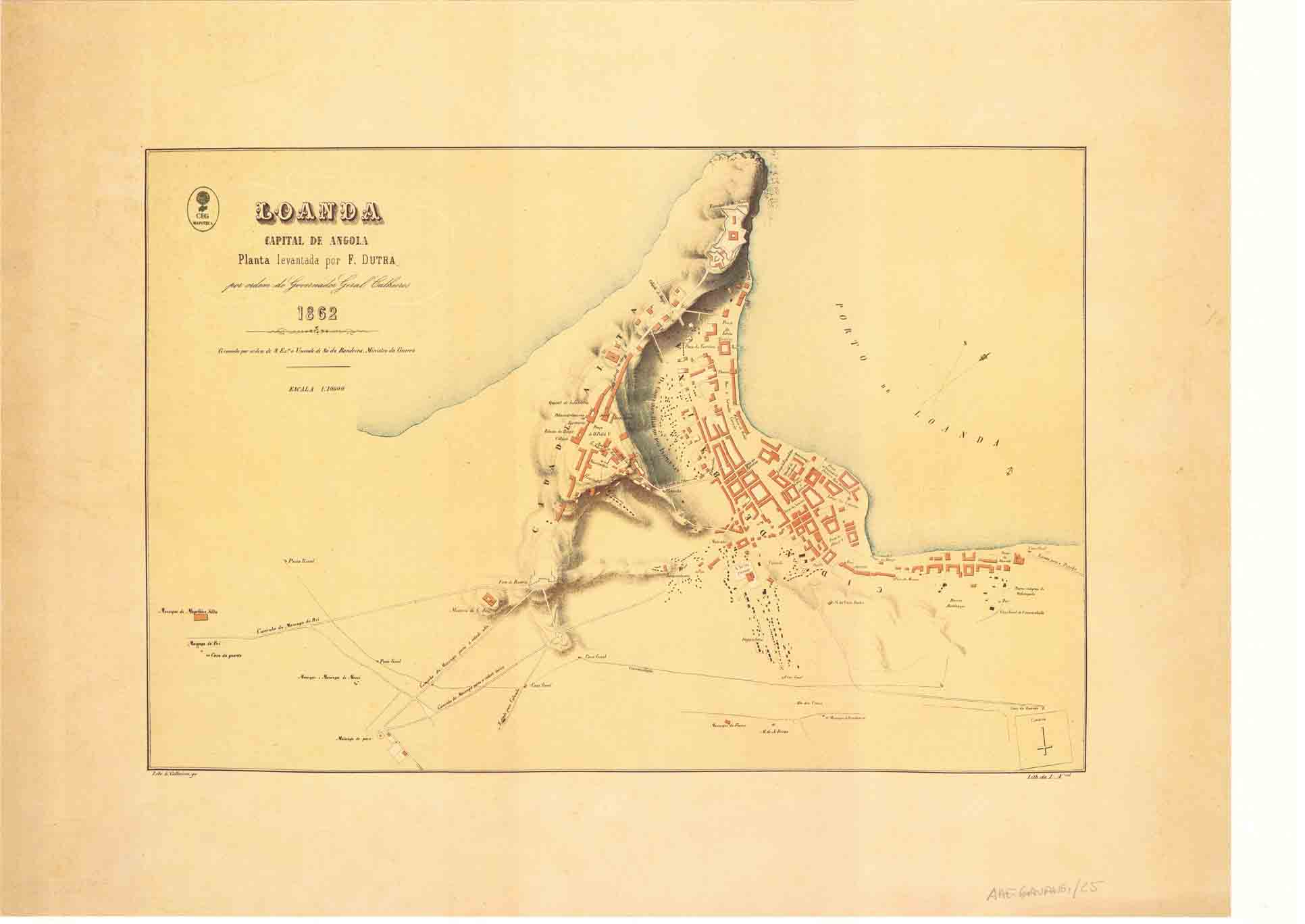
Luanda in 1862.

The occupation of Angola was carried out gradually in more than 180 small campaigns and beyond the fact that no chartered companies operated in its territory, it did not differ greatly from Mozambique. Some were relatively large-scale, such as the Cuamatos Campaign in 1907 and the Dembos Campaign in 1907–1909. The most extensive was the Southern Angola Campaign in 1914–1915. The two most difficult regions to pacify were the Dembos, in the hilly country to the northeast of Luanda, and southern Angola.

Boers would play a relevant role in the Portuguese occupation of southern Angola, for both good and bad reasons. They first settled in the Moçamedes plateau in 1882 or slightly before. They were an enterprising community that built flourishing transport businesses in the southern highlands with their great ox wagons. They also often cooperated with the Portuguese Armed Forces as irregulars. On the other hand, they were a distabilizing force that hostilized both Portuguese and Africans just as often, forcing the Portuguese state to mobilize troops to the area, namely the Moçâmedes Dragoon Company.

=== The occupation of the interior ===
In the north of Angola, Portugal was recognized Cabinda along with the left bank of the Congo River as far as Noqui at the Berlin Conference. Ambrizete was occupied in 1886, Portuguese objectives being to establish administrative, fiscal and military posts into the hinterland along the border with the Congo Free State.

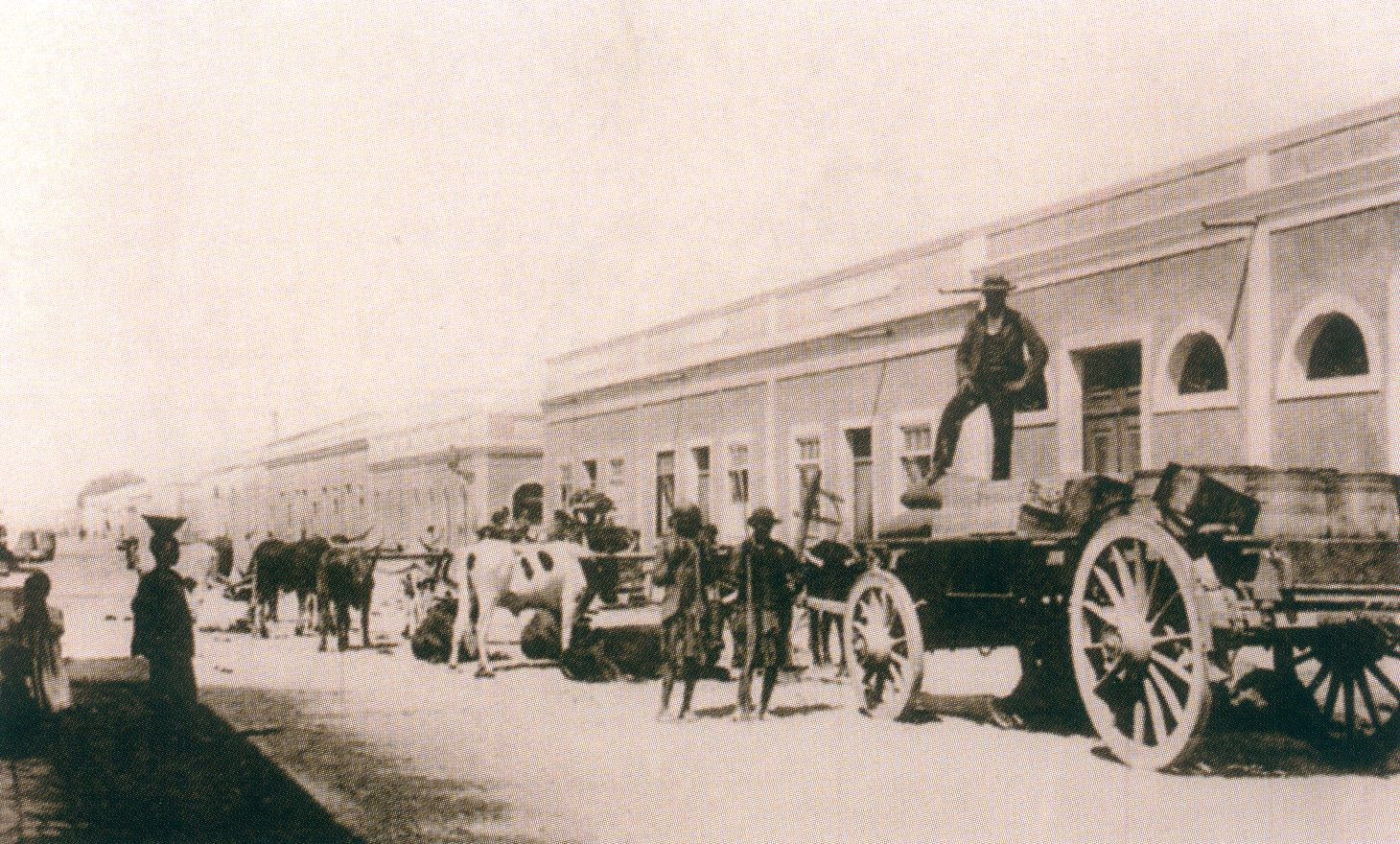
Boer wagons in Moçâmedes, Angola in 1908.

In the south, Portuguese priorities were to counteract German influence emanating from German South West Africa. The border was not yet clearly defined and the Portuguese government feared German encroachment. Germany had conducted a survey of the harbours of Tigres Strait, Porto Alexandre and Moçâmedes, and some German elites suggested the military occupation of Tigres Strait in order to link it to the Boer republics by rail in case a war with Great Britain broke out. Boer refugees from the First Anglo-Boer War helped push the frontier southwards with their great Ox-wagons but this also brought about conflict with the Ovambo. Huíla was the epicentre of Portuguese activity in the south. An expedition led by Artur de Paiva set out from Huíla in 1886 and established the forts Princesa Amélia and Dona Maria close to two strategic fording points on the Cubango River, to put an end to Ovambo raids, especially by the Cuanhama tribe. In 1887, the Moçâmedes Dragoon Company faced the third Humbe revolt during a cattle vaccination campaign on the lands of king Nambonga, and one of its four platoons was massacred in Jamba Camufate during a retreat in the middle of the rainy season. The distinguished Count of Almoster was among the dead, hence news of the incident caused outrage once they reached Portugal and the region was pacified by Artur de Paiva between January and August of the following year. Fort Dona Maria was attacked by Cuanhamas in 1889, but Artur de Paiva conducted a 24-day campaign against them with a small detachment of troops, that included Boer mercenaries.

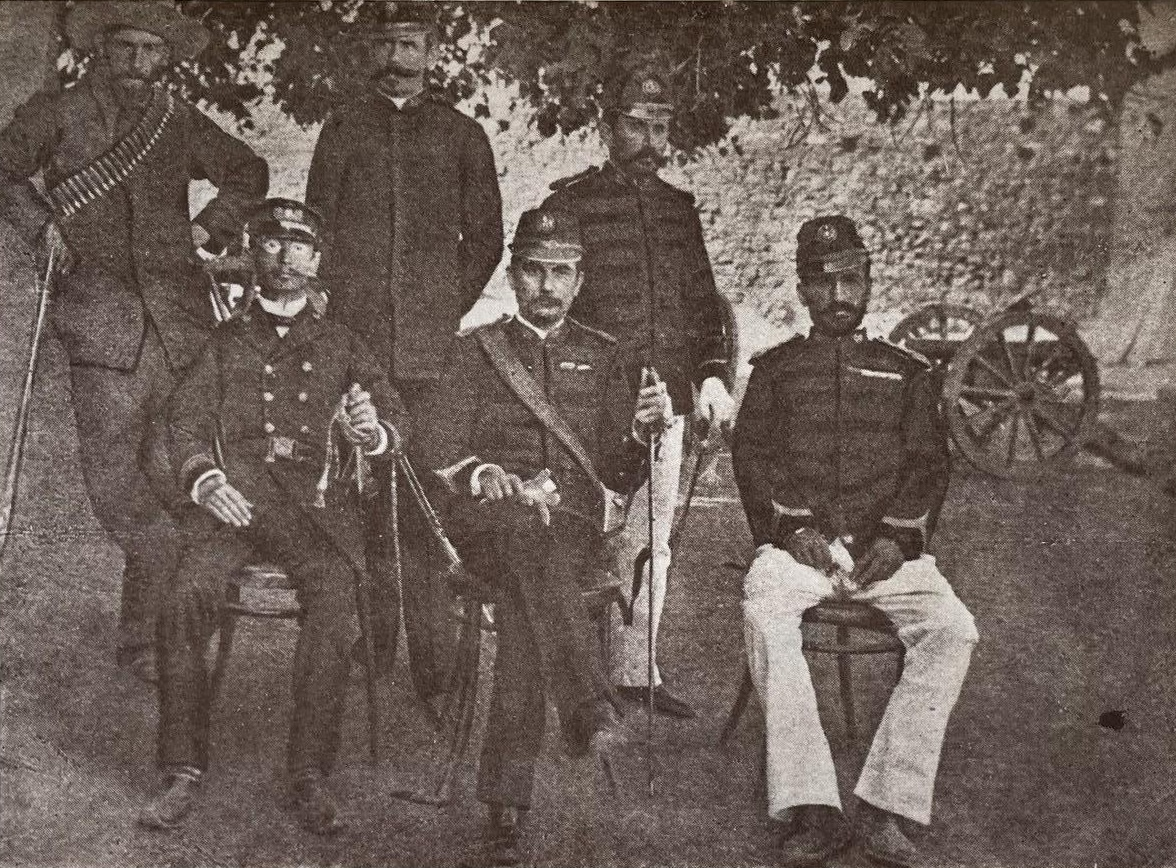
Chief of staff of the Humbe campaign 1891.

A third front was opened in the centre in 1890, directed at the Central Plateau. Early in that year, the king of Viye issued an ultimatum of his own at Portugal and humiliated the renowned explorer Silva Porto, who committed suicide on the occasion, both of which caused a clamor in Portugal and resulted in the conquest of Viye by Artur de Paiva between October and December. Fort Silva Porto was established at Cuíto and the kingdom annexed. The same happened to the Kingdom of Bailundo the following year. Still in 1891, the border with the Congo Free State in the Lunda region to the northeast was settled diplomatically and once this was done, Portuguese authority in the north was gradually extended inland through the establishment of military, administrative or tax posts emanating from Malange.

The kingdom of Humbe had been hostile since 1887, but it was pacified in 1898 following a seven-month campaign also led by Artur de Paiva, who suffered considerable casualties as it was carried out during the rainy season.

Portuguese military presence in the centre remained thin and it was challenged by the Bailundo revolt in 1902. Attempt to unite all the Ovimbundu kingdoms in the rebellion was a failure due to slave-raiding between Ovimbundu kingdoms, and the leader of the revolt, Mutu-ya-Kevela was seen as a major slave-raider in the neighbouring kingdom of Wambu. Portuguese reinforcements were rushed to the region with heavy armaments, Mutu-ya-Kevela was killed in combat and the plateau was definitively pacified later that year in October.

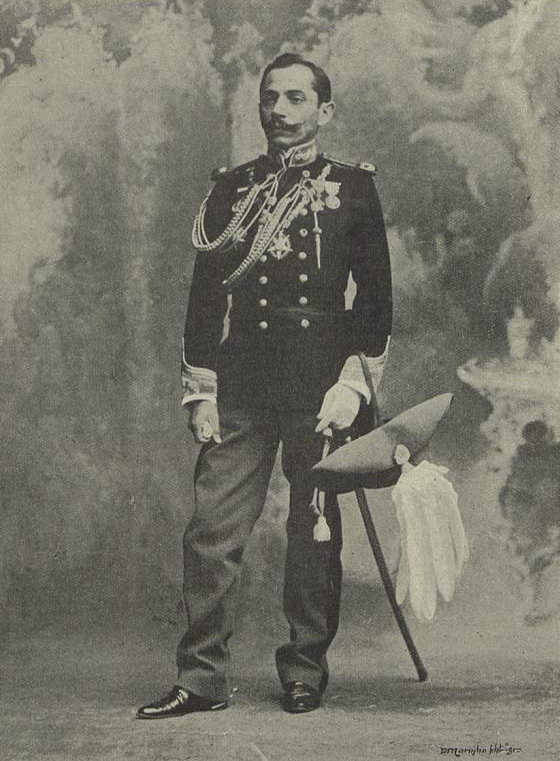
Lieutenant-Colonel Alves Roçadas.

In the south, the Cuamatos raided Portuguese territory the same year that the Bailundo Revolt broke out. The governor of the district of Huíla João Maria de Aguiar was instructed to subdue the hostile Cuamatos and Cuanhama tribes before the Germans claimed their territory, as the frontier was not yet established. The campaign was launched on 19 September 1904 and led by Alves Roçadas, who was tasked with annexing the Cuamato and Cuanhama. It was the first major Portuguese campaign beyond the Cunene River and it involved about 2000 men, of which roughly half were drawn from the home army, but it ended in defeat at the Battle of the Cunene, where a detachment was massacred.

The ‘Disaster of Pembe’ as it came to be known galvanised the Ovambo, particularly the Cuamatos, who began attacking tribes under Portuguese protection and even threatening Portuguese estates north of the Cunene. It also galvanised Portuguese public opinion however, and the Portuguese government was forced to intervene in the region.

Aguiar was replaced with Alves Roçadas, who enacted a number of preliminary military actions and diplomatic accords with the neighbouring tribes over the two following years, in preparation for a new campaign against the Cuamatos. He annexed the small kingdom of Mulondo in 1905 and established Fort Mulondo there, followed shortly afterwards by Fort Roçadas further south, in Cuamato territory. The following year, João de Almeida successfully conducted a perilous reconnaissance mission to Cuanhama and Evale.

=== The tenure of Paiva Couceiro ===
Portuguese occupation of the interior of Angola remained irregular until Paiva Couceiro took office as interim governor-general on 24 May 1907. He laid out a plan to systematically chart and garrison the entire territory using the railroads of Luanda, Benguela and Moçâmedes, up navigable rivers and through roads to be opened. Means were scarce however, and Portuguese troops in Angola by then numbered only 5065 men, of which only 1700 were whites.

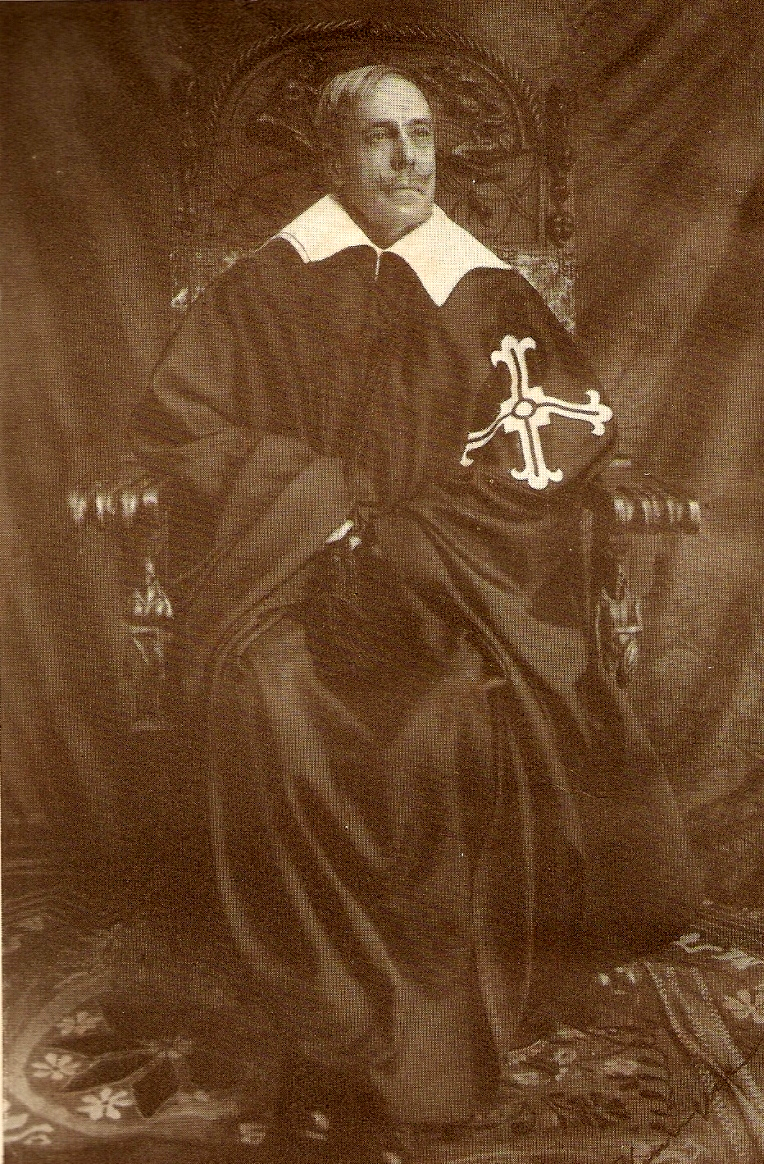
Henrique Mitchell de Paiva Couceiro.

On August 26, 1907, Alves Roçadas launched the planned campaign in the south with nearly 2500 men, 10 cannon and two machine-guns and five forts were built in the two Cuamato kingdoms. Yet the Cuamatos continued to engage in guerrilla warfare alongside the Cuanhamas with German support. While the Cuamatos Campaign was ongoing, João de Almeida led 526 men, two cannon, two machineguns and 400 militiamen on a campaign in the Dembos to the north, where three forts were built between 19 September and December 1907. To the northeast, the governor of Lunda Alberto Teixeira de Almeida had military outposts built in Xá-Quilongue, Cuilo and Luchico that year and in the next, though he faced attacks by the Chokwe. Operations in the northeast would continue the following years.

In 1908, two outposts were built at Pinda and Quelo to the south of the Congo river mouth in order to pacify the region as far as Noqui and suppress the brigandage led by the Marquis of Mossul, who blocked traffic between Luanda and Ambriz. The region of Libolo was also annexed that year with the construction of an outpost at Cassueca. João de Almeida was appointed governor of Huíla in 1909 and that year he annexed Evale with the construction of the forts Dom Manuel in Cuvelai and Henrique Couceiro in Dombondola, in the middle of the rainy season. Almeida also established forts in Cuangar, Dirico and Mucusso by the border with German Southwest Africa.

Couceiro quit in 1909 but his short two-year term is considered one of the most effective in the history of Portuguese Angola. He was compared to Hubert Lyautey, Joseph Gallieni or Frederick Lugard. His program would be followed in the coming decades.

Alves Roçadas succeeded Paiva Couceiro as governor-general of Angola, though he quit after the republican coup in 1910. Cassai was reached in 1912 and the occupation of the northeast was complete. A revolt broke out the following year in the Kingdom of Kongo against the traditional government, and this incident resulted in the partition of Kongo between Portugal and Belgium.

=== The pacification of the south ===
The Portuguese forts of Naulila and Cuangar in southern Angola.

After the outbreak of WW1, the Cuangar fort was attacked by German forces on 31 October 1914. The same happened at the fort of Naulila on 18 December, where 69 Portuguese were killed and 36 taken prisoner during the Battle of Naulila.

Alves Roçadas ordered a withdrawal from southern Angola and the establishment of a new line of defence in Gambos in anticipation for a major German offensive. Such an offensive never materialized but the attack on Naulila resulted in the complete and final cutting of communications and supplies to German South West Africa from Angola, isolating the territory that the Royal Navy had already blockaded by sea.

The withdrawal of Portuguese troops allowed the Ovambo to revolt and also turn their weapons towards each other in violent tribal conflict once more. The populations of Huíla revolted, causing a long crisis that would only be resolved with the arrival of a large expeditionary force commanded by General Pereira d'Eça, "the Steel General", (General d'Aço in Portuguese) who landed in Angola in March 1915.

On 7 July 1915, Portuguese forces reoccupied Humbe, encountering no resistance but struggling with a severe shortage of water. In Humbe, the land had been burned and all able-bodied men had sought refuge in Cuamatos and Cuanhama, leaving behind women and children.

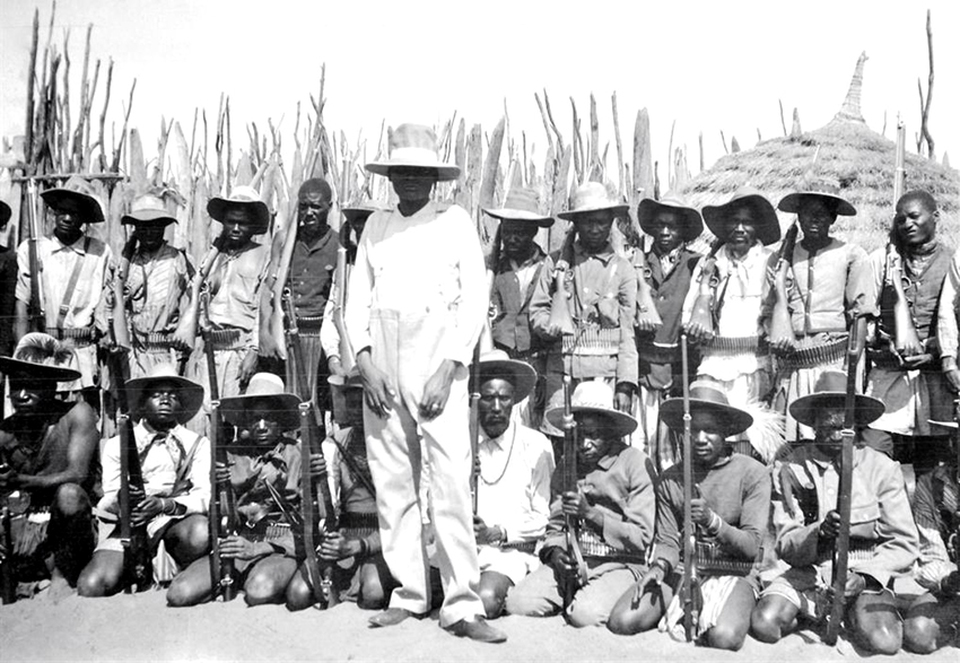
King Mandume and his warriors.

On 9 July, German forces commanded by General Victor Franke surrendered to General Louis Botha, commander-in-chief of the South African Union forces. General Pereira d'Eça's mission was thus reduced to the pacification of the Ovambo who had rebelled against Portuguese authority.

On 15 August, a column of General Pereira d'Eça's forces reoccupied the Cuamato fort. Between 18 and 20 August, the Battle of Môngua took place, in which the main column of the expeditionary forces, consisting of 3,000 men commanded personally by General Pereira d'Eça dispersed the Ovambo warriors led by king Mandume himself. The Ovambo numbered 15,000 Cuanhamas, 10,000 Cuamatos and 20,000 warriors from Damaraland, although estimates vary. One Portuguese officer and fifteen soldiers died in combat, while six officers and twenty-four soldiers were wounded. On Mandume's side, an estimated 4,000 to 5,000 were killed.

On 4 September, Pereira d'Eça occupied Ondjiva, capital of the Cuanhama kingdom, without resistance. With Humbe, Cuamatos, Evale and Cuanhama reoccupied, the rebellion was quelled and a period of peace ensued which would last for more than 40 years after Mandume's death in 1917.

== Timor ==
Map of Portuguese Timor.

The pacification campaigns were not limited to Africa but also extended to the island of Timor. The Portuguese had come into contact with Timor in 1512 and although some merchants and Dominican missionaries settled on the island, official presence was only definitively established two centuries later.

At the end of the 19th century, Timor remained divided into numerous independent kingdoms, each subdivided into clans, that often fought each other or among each other to capture slaves, cattle, and prizes such as enemy heads, the cutting of which was a ritual of warrior consecration, and which could be offered to the ruler in exchange for gifts. People considered to have become possessed by an evil spirit would be impaled or buried alived along with their family and their property confiscated by relatives, until the Portuguese eventually forbade this practice along with that of human sacrifice, usually a slave. The Timorese ritual sacrifice of war-prisoners by decapitation and the consumption of their blood in a common bowl was the subject of particular disgust among the Portuguese. Timorese kings and vassals were all connected by marriages or blood oaths, alliances between kingdoms were unstable and opportunistic, rebellions by warrior clans frequent and when kings provided the Portuguese with contingents of warriors they were known to provide some to their enemies as well.

Timor was roughly divided between the region of Belu in east, where Tetum was spoken primarily or as a second language, and Servião to the west, where the Atoni lived. Governor Afonso de Castro estimated in 1867 that the island was divided in 62 kingdoms, 46 in Belu and 16 in Servião. The total population of Timor was estimated at 300,000 people in the 1880s. The most populated kingdom was Luca, with 25,000 people, followed by Motael with 18,400, Ambeno with 18,000, Sarau with 12,000 and Maubara and Ermera with 10,000 each, while the rest averaged at about 3,000 to 6,000 people.

=== The era of indirect Portuguese rule, 1702-1894 ===
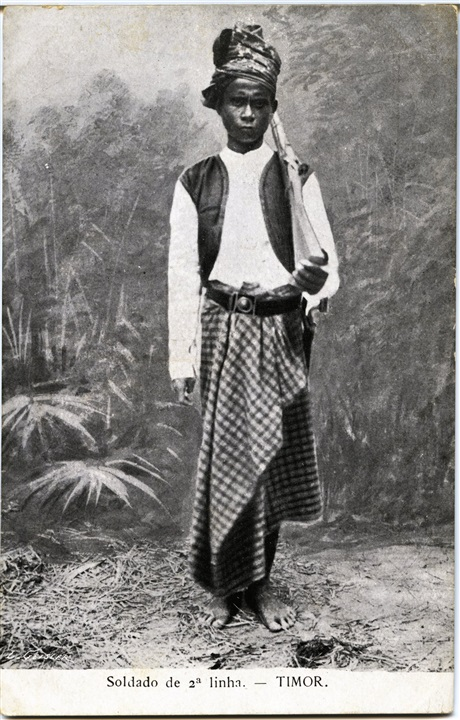
Timorese morador on Portuguese Timor in 1909.

Portugal established a permanent administration on the island in 1702 and for the next 192 years pursued a policy of indirect rule over the native kingdoms of Timor. Some sought trade and allegiance through pacts of vassalage voluntarily, though others rejected Portuguese overlordship and remained hostile. By 1703, 23 kingdoms had pledged allegiance to Portugal, while 9 were hostile. The Portuguese administration bestowed military ranks on vassal Timorese authorities such as liurais, datos and village chiefs in return for oaths of vassalage that was copied by the Dutch, followed by the payment of a tribute, called finta. Liurais were given the ranks of brigadier, colonel or lieutenant-colonel, while the heads of a kingdoms sucos or districts were attributed the ranks of major and captain; village chiefs were given the ranks of lieutenant and alferes. Oaths usually followed a form similar to the one signed by king Luís dos Reis e Cunha of Luca on 20 July 1877:

I, Dom Luís dos Reis e Cunha, Brigadier King of the Kingdom of Luca, swear to the Holy Gospels in the hands of the Honorable Joaquim António da Silva Ferrão, Governor of the district of Timor, vassalage to the King of Portugal Dom Luiz I, and for homage and honor compel me to fulfill all the orders of the governing lords, to pay the tribute of the same kingdom, and give assistance in war and for whatever other service, in the towns of outside it, as the governing authorities shall order.

— Liurai Dom Luís dos Reis e Cunha of Luca, 20 July 1877

The Portuguese would also affirm blood pacts with Timorese kings, and exchange symbols of authority such as Portuguese flags and military ranks which were "soon deeply embedded in collective values and underpinned the position of the elites in various ways". Yet attempts at deeply regulating the politics of Timorese kingdoms often resulted in revolt, suppressed with the help of vassal Timorese lords. Alliances fluctuacted constantly and governor Afonso de Castro would comment that:

Rebellion in Timor continues successively, leading us to conclude that revolt is a normal state and that peace is exceptional

— Governor Afonso de Castro.

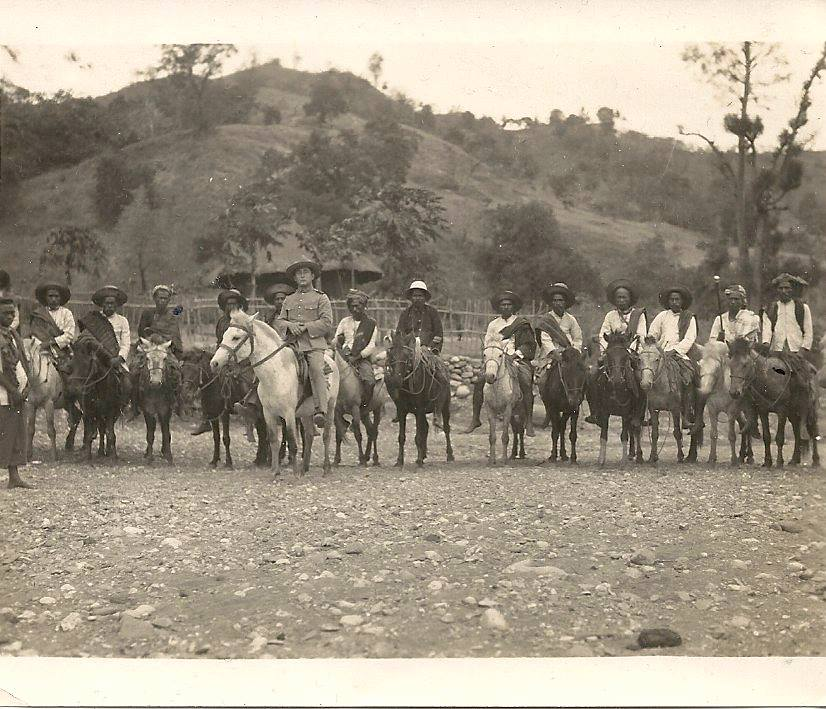
Timorese cavalry forces in Balibó, commanded by Portuguese officer António Macedo.

Portuguese forces in Timor were divided in a first line of a regular army soldiers, officers, column commanders, sergeants and artillerymen and a second line of Timorese moradores militiamen on foot or horseback, trained and led by Portuguese or Timorese sergeants and officers. In times of war, allied Timorese kings were called up to lead contingents of their warriors on campaign. Regular army soldiers were few in number on Timor however, and for this reason the Portuguese administration relied heavily on Timorese moradores militiamen and auxiliary warriors. When the Portuguese army garrison in Dili revolted on May 30, 1864, over the lack of pay, the regent of Maubara and the liurai Dom João of Liquiçá offered to help suppress the revolt with 2000 warriors.

Garrisons were established in eleven locations in the 1850s, though Portugal still relied heavily on alliances with Timorese rulers.

=== The occupation of Timor ===
By the late 19th century, Timor was marked by instability, while the Portuguese administration struggled with a lack of manpower and resources. Portuguese rule was limited to Dili and a number of military outposts established in allied kingdoms through the island, seven in the north and three in the south. Portuguese Timor was administered as a district of Macau at the time, but governor José Maria de Sousa Horta e Costa opposed this due to budget concerns.

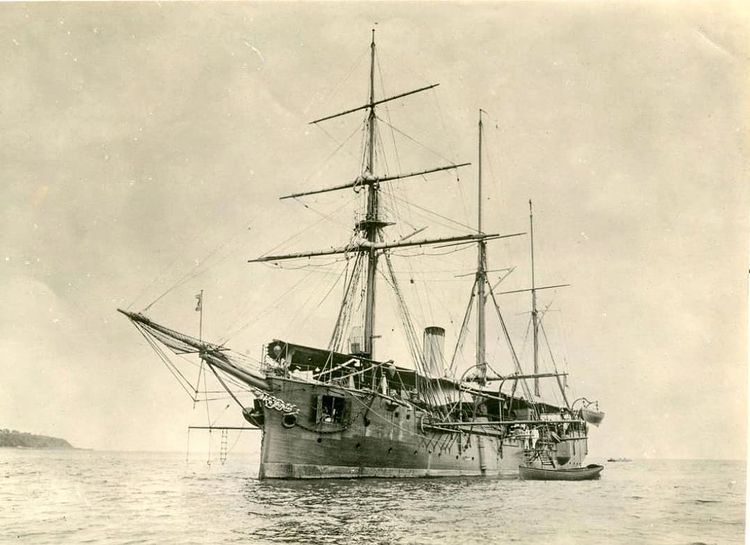
Portuguese gunboat Diu (1889–1913)

A considerable number of Chinese merchants were active throughout the island, but the Portuguese administration considered them a source of instability as they engaged in smuggling, weapons trafficking and incited the Timorese to revolt. Many were accused by the Timorese of kidnapping children to sell into slavery over debts, while the merchants themselves often complained of theft and assault.

In 1893, a revolt broke out in the kingdom of Maubara, where Portugal held two military outposts garrisoned by Goan troops. The queen of Maubara, Dona Ana, scarcely controlled the chiefs in her kingdom while the smuggling of coffee and firearms by Chinese merchants was rampant. The rebels led by chief Maubute overran the Portuguese military outposts at Daire and Fatuboro after their garrisons had run out of ammunition, and 11 Goan soldiers were beheaded along with 2 Portuguese officers, while the women were impaled. Maubara was then besieged on May 27 but reinforcements arrived from Macau the following month, on the gunboat Diu. With the help of its artillery, the Portuguese repulsed the rebels and by July 2 the rebellion had been quelled, with Maubute having perished in combat.

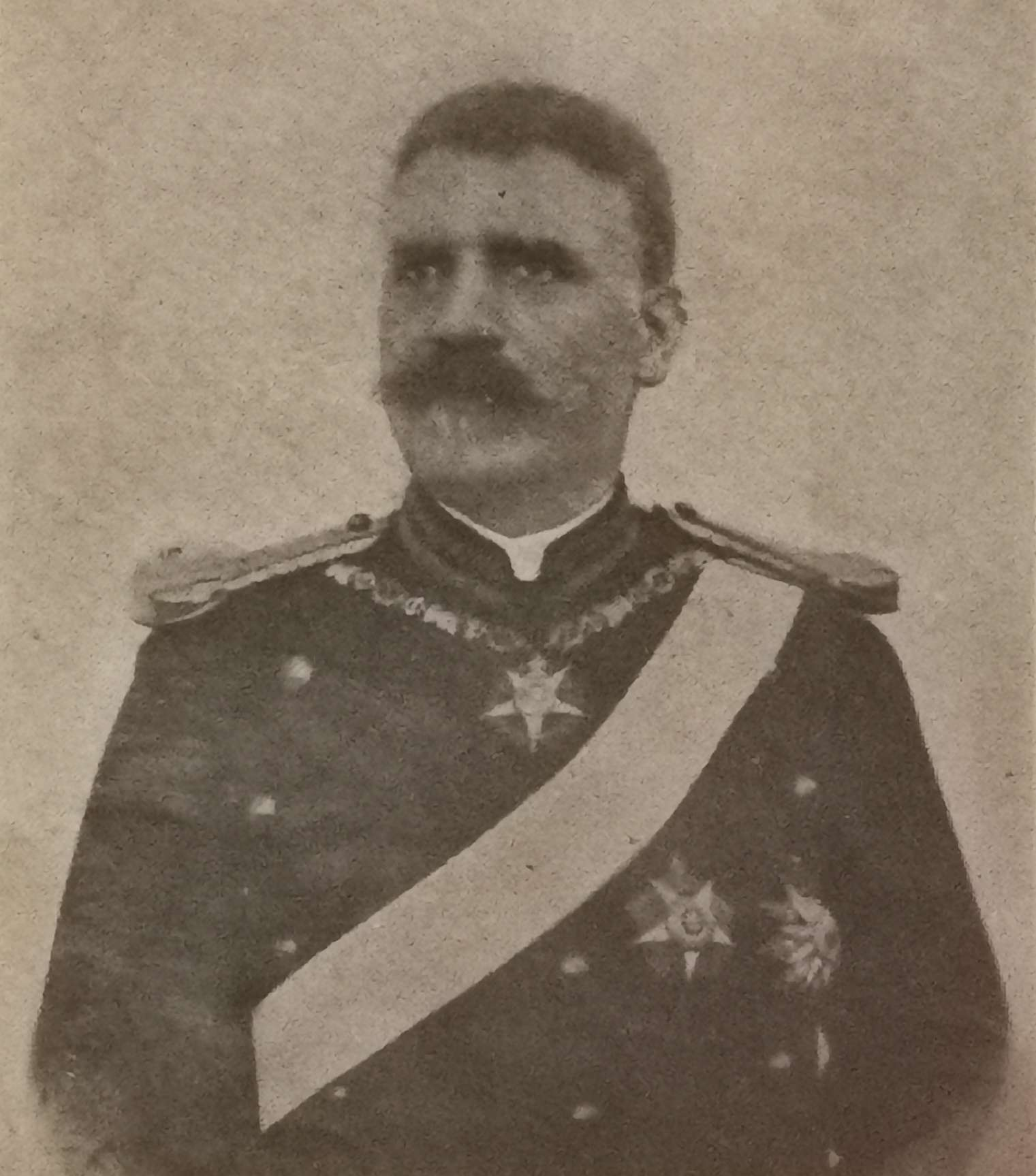
The governor of Timor José Celestino da Silva.

Maubara had considerable repercussions. The region was pillaged and plague set in, causing 300 dead, while epidemics of cholera and beri-beri broke out around Dili. It was the last conflict before the occupation of Timor was launched in earnest by José Celestino da Silva, whose professionalism had been noted by king Carlos himself and earned him the personal support of the monarch. Silva took office on 11 May 1894 and he sought to occupy the island, promote coffee cultivation and suppress smuggling, weapons trafficking and the slave trade. Silva learned Tetum and employed a secret personal cipher in communications. The Timorese referred to him as Embote, meaning "governor" or literally "big thing". He resorted to alliances with Timorese kings against hostile ones and fostered the creation of moradores companies between 1894 and 1908.

The first campaign targeted the hostile kingdoms of Lamaquitos, Suai, Raimean and Cailaco, and owed its success to the support of allied Timorese liurai and their warriors. The second one was launched on 24 May 1895 against the kingdoms of Cailaco, Obulo, Marobo, Atabae, Balibó and Fatumean, which were found to have revolted with the encouragement of Chinese merchants resentful of tighter controls by Portuguese authorities on smuggling and weapons trafficking. When the third war broke out in August 1895 against the kingdom of Manufahi Portugal mobilized more than 12,000 Timorese auxiliaries, but it was called off on 28 October after several soldiers were killed in an ambush.

The debacle at Manufahi had important repercussions. Silva was heavily criticised in the Macanaese press and he asked to be relieved from his position but this was refused. Instead, the Portuguese government had Timor detached from Macau and made Silva directly subordinate to Lisbon on 17 October 1896.

The city of Dili in 1870.

In July 1896, Batugadé was occupied and then a campaign was carried out against Dato-Talo, involving 208 soldiers, four cannon, artillerymen, officers, 560 moradores and 7,558 auxiliaries. The heaviest fighting of the campaigns on Timor took place that year between early September and 5 October, on the Deribate escarpment in the sacred forest of Talo, involving around 3,000 Timorese moradores. They were led by the Portuguese alferes Francisco Duarte, a war-hero of the campaigns in Timor and known among the Timorese as Arbiru ("invincible man" in Tetum). The border with Dutch Timor was declared occupied on 23 October. Duarte fought in five major campaigns, and legends circulated in Kemak lore that he could only be killed by a golden bullet, but he died in combat on 17 July 1899. He was buried in Santa Cruz cemetery, where his mausoleum remains. A stone would be erected in his honor at the site of his death in Bobonaro in 1959.

Celestino da Silva was succeeded in office by Eduardo Marques, who reduced the number of military outposts to avoid stretching Portuguese forces too thin and save costs, and also replaced the finta tribute with the taxation of individual adult Timorese, which bred resentment. The pacification of Timor was concluded during the tenure of Filomeno da Câmara de Melo Cabral, during whose term the Dutch attempted to occupy Lakumara and the Manufahi revolt broke out.

Due to the great distance between Europe and Timor, few regular army soldiers were deployed to the theater. About 2,200 European soldiers participated in 56 campaigns between 1847 and 1913, supported by some 6,000 Timorese moradores and 108,000 Timorese auxiliaries, the Timorese accounting for 98% of the forces employed by the Portuguese.

== Guinea-Bissau ==
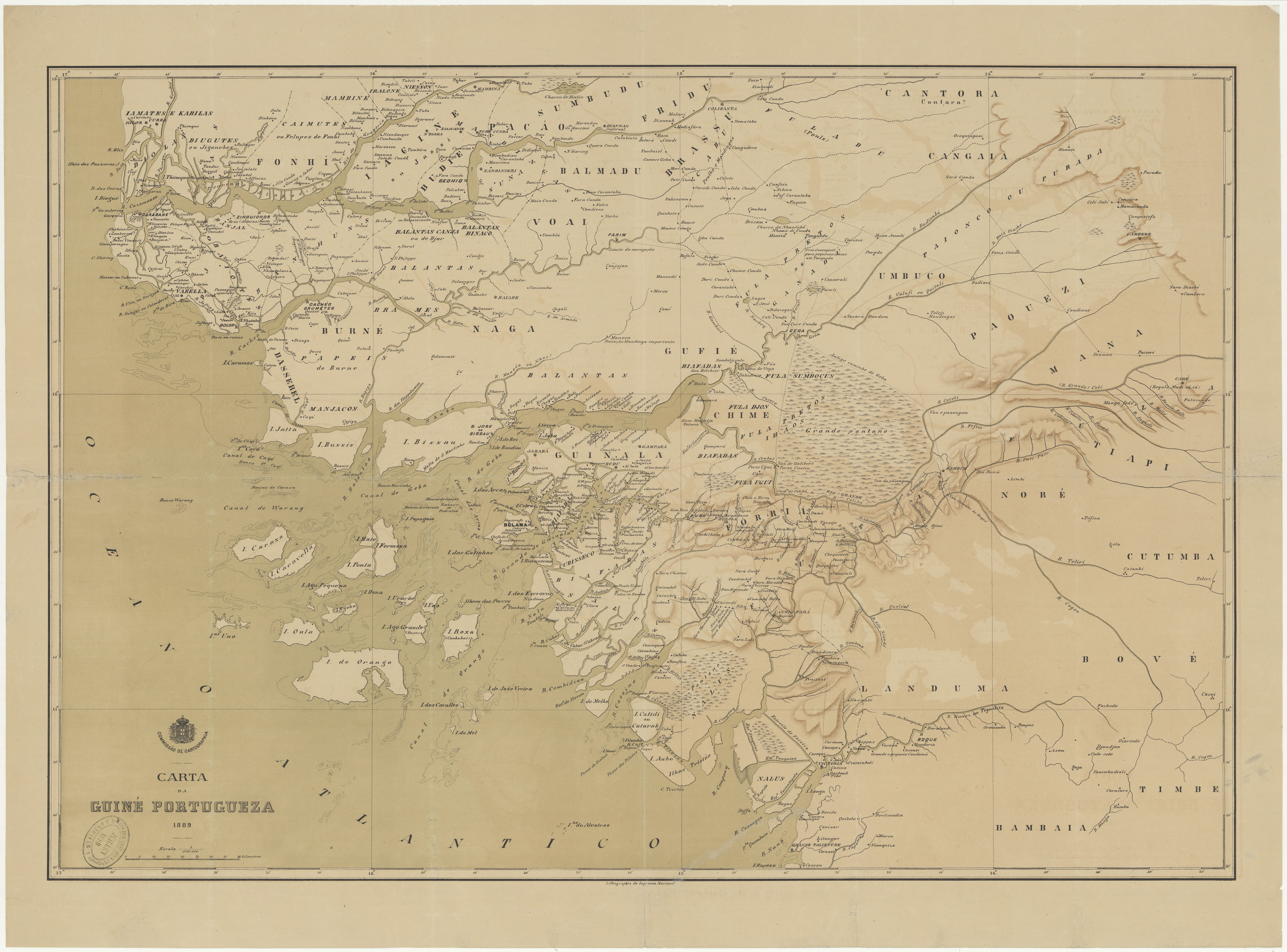
Portuguese chart of Guinea in 1889.

Guinea had historically been part of the province of Cape Verde, but the region was threatened by British encroachment from the sea, and French encroachment from the landside.

Portugal detached Guinea from Cape Verde on 18 March 1879, with Agostinho Coelho as first governor. Bolama was chosen as the capital but Portugal also held the settlements of Ziguinchor, Cacheu, Farim, Bissau, and Geba. Once the new province was created, all 250 soldiers of the 1st Cape Verdean Caçadores Battalion were transferred to Guinea.

From then on, the Portuguese abandoned their policy of trade and neutrality and became more deeply involved in the region, by that time devastated by inter-ethnic and religious conflict. Campaigns in Guinea aimed at pacifying the numerous ethnic groups that attacked Portuguese towns, establishing protectorates over native rulers and collect taxes. Due to the ethnic diversity of Guinea and the scarcity of means in this theater, Portuguese policy was based on alliances with local groups to defeat others.

In 1868, the Fula kingdom of Forrea was established, with the almami of the Fouta Djallon Confederation being recognized as suzerain. However, ten years later a civil-war broke out between the Fulas and between these and the Biafadas and Mandinkas. This protracted conflict raged furiously from about 1878 and 1890 and gave the Portuguese a pretext to intervene in the region. Conflict with the Fula of Forrea was rendered inevitable by the stream of refugees who sought the protection of the Portuguese garrison at Buba and used the territory to launch raids on Forrea. The Fulas attacked Portuguese posts along the Rio Grande de Buba and the Portuguese administration retaliated with pacification campaigns, consisting of large columns of African auxiliaries, mainly Biafadas and Mandinkas.

=== Riverine campaigns ===
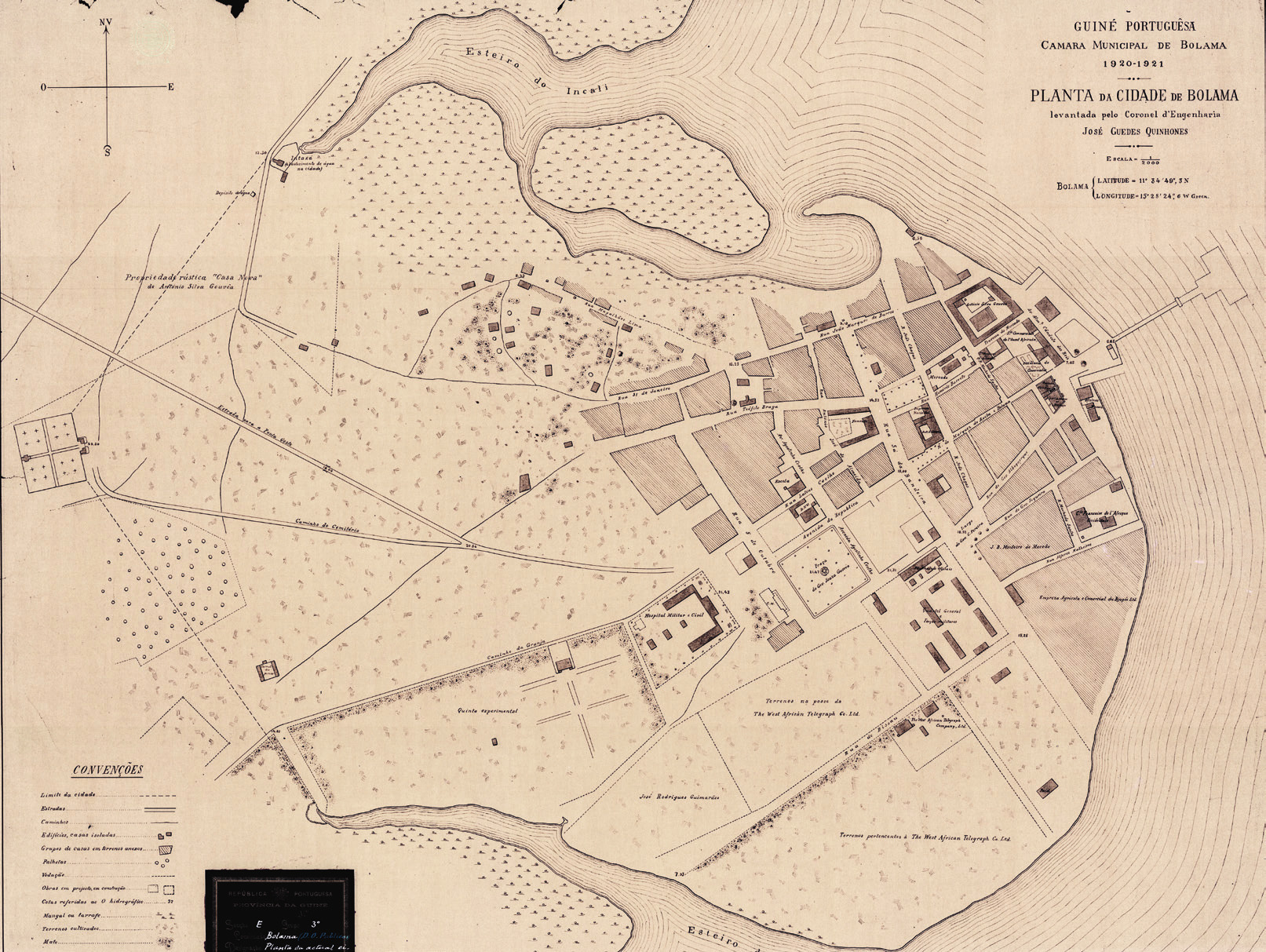
Map of Bolama by the Lisbon Geographic Society (1920–1921)

The years between 1879 and 1891 were marked by amphibious and riverside campaigns. The Portuguese carried out 22 campaigns in coastal areas, each involving an average of 100 soldiers, usually supported by gunboats and thousands of auxiliaries, against the Bijago, Biafada, Papel, Balanta and Fula, who attacked Portuguese towns and resisted the payment of taxes.

Multiple operations followed against the Biafada in Jabadá, the Papel in Bissau and Biombo, the Balanta in Nhacra, and the Manjacos in Caió. In May 1881, governor Agostinho Coelho signed a protectorate treaty with the Nalus kings around the Tombali River and thus annexed the southern coast of Guinea.

Campaigns against the Fula of Forrea intensified significantly after the arrival of the bellicose governor Pedro Inácio de Gouveia in 1882 and the result was the signing of a number of treaties with powerful Fula lords such as Mamadu Pate of Bolola and Bacar Quidali, the main lord of Forrea. They would become the greatest allies of the Portuguese administration in the pacification of Guinea.

The boundaries of Guinea-Bissau were settled by the Franco-Portuguese Convention of 1886. Still this year, the Portuguese joined forces with rebel Fulberibe chiefs of Fuladu to defeat the army of king Musa Molo at the Battle of Mansomine in July. Musa Molo later attacked the Biafadas and Mandinkas. In September, 80 Portuguese soldiers supported by 4300 Biafada and Mandinka warriors counter-attacked and at the Battle of Fancá defeated Musa Molo, who then fled. A peace treaty was signed with Musa Molo on April 3, 1887.

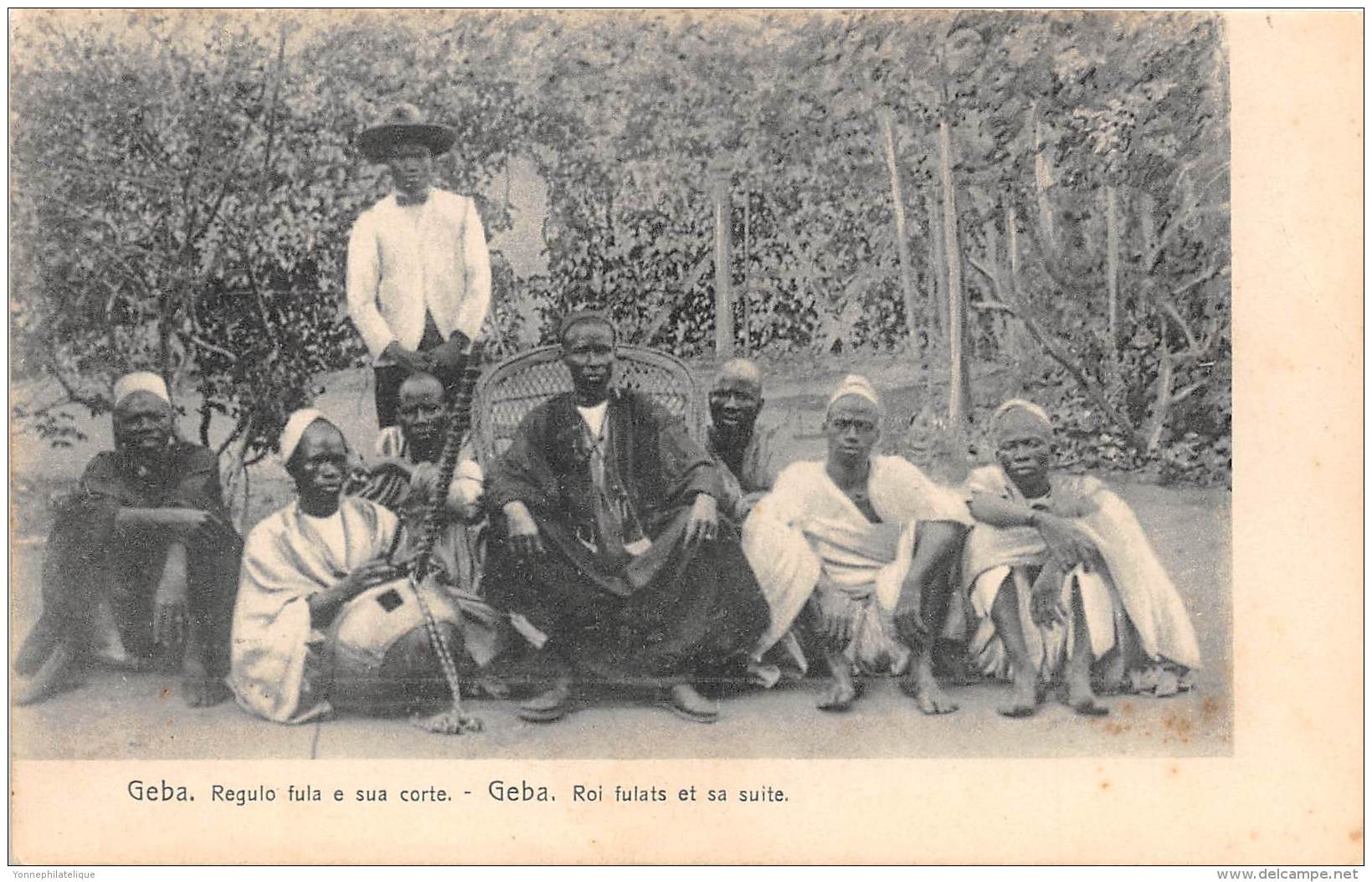
Fula kinglet and his Court in an early 20th century Portuguese photograph.

The Portuguese began to penetrate inland in 1892 and this year all Fula rulers recognized Portuguese sovereignty. The Portuguese administration negotiated a settlement of indirect rule with the Muslim Fula, who were largely left to their own devices in relative peace and security in the interior until the time of independence, and thus no campaigns were undertaken inland. This accord allowed the Portuguese to recruit a great number of Muslim auxiliaries, pacify the north and east of the territory, and settle the borders with French West Africa, but river navigation remained unsafe. About half of Guinea remained unpacified and the Papel blocked the roads to Bissau. Guinean auxiliaries numbered about 1530 to 4000 men at this time, and more than 17,000 to 21,000 are estimated to have fought for Portugal until 1908.

Bissau was attacked on 7 December 1893 by an estimated 3000 Papel and Balanta warriors, but they were repulsed with heavy casualties on both sides. Governor Luís Augusto de Vasconcelos e Sá lead an expedition consisting largely of Africans led by Abdul Injai against the Papel and Balantas on 10 May 1894. On July, representatives of the Papel of Intim, Bandim, Antula and Safim signed an act of capitulation in which they agreed to pay taxes among other terms in exchange for peace but it was disregarded.

Further operations would be launched towards northwestern Guinea between 1893 and 1912 to pacify, disarm and levy taxes from the animist Manjak, Bijagós, Mandinkas, Felupes, Biafada, Papel and Balantas, but these were always met with stubborn resistance and ultimately unsuccessful.

=== The pacification of the animists ===
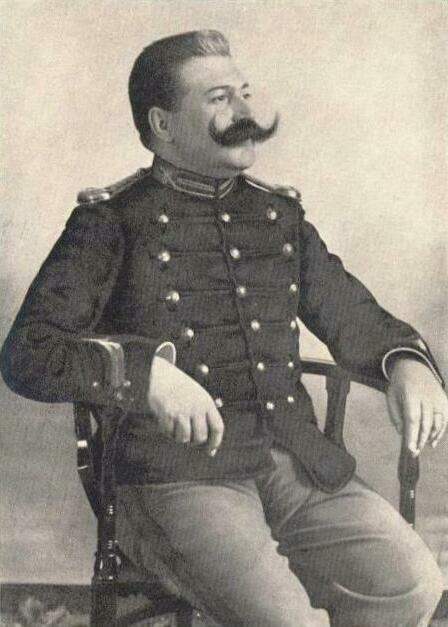
João Teixeira Pinto.

João Teixeira Pinto was to play a decisive role the pacification of Guinea, as chief of staff. He was an expert in the use of African auxiliaries, with many years of experience in the difficult theater of southern Angola, where he had been born. During his career he gained the nickname Capitão Diabo ("Captain Devil"). With the support of chief Abdul Injai and the mass recruitment of Muslim auxiliaries, Teixeira Pinto launched a series of campaigns, first against the Balanta and Mandinka, between April and August 1913; against the Manjak between January and April 1914; against and the Balanta once again, between May and July 1914; and finally against the Papel and Grumete in Bissau between May and August 1915.

Pinto began by scouting the kingdom of Oio disguised as a commercial agent, with the support of a French merchant at Mansoa, Charles Mangue, but he was recognized and returned to Farim after narrowly surviving an assassination attempt by poisoning. With the support of administrator and commander of militias Calvet de Magalhães and Abdul Injai, Pinto attacked the kingdom of Oio from the south, sailing up the Geba and establishing a camp at Mansoa, where he formed a fortified infantry square. It was attacked by Balantas, who suffered heavy losses and withdrew from action after losing heart. Meanwhile, Calvet de Magalhães travelled to Bafatá to recruit Fula auxiliaries, and he then marched on Oio from the north. Pinto and Injai advanced into Oio, armed with a 70mm cannon, the use of which proved decisive. In spite of heavy resistance, Oio submitted, the population was disarmed, Magalhães set up an administration post at Mansabá and taxes were levied. Injai was installed as king of Oio as a reward for his support.

The Manjak massacred a Portuguese tax brigade at Churoenque in December. The Portuguese administrator of Cacheu was among the dead and a campaign was launched against the Manjak in January 1914, with the support of Injais forces and a 70mm gun. The Manjak were at the time preparing to assault Cacheu. A combat was struck at Churoenque in February 1914 and Churo was pacified by April.

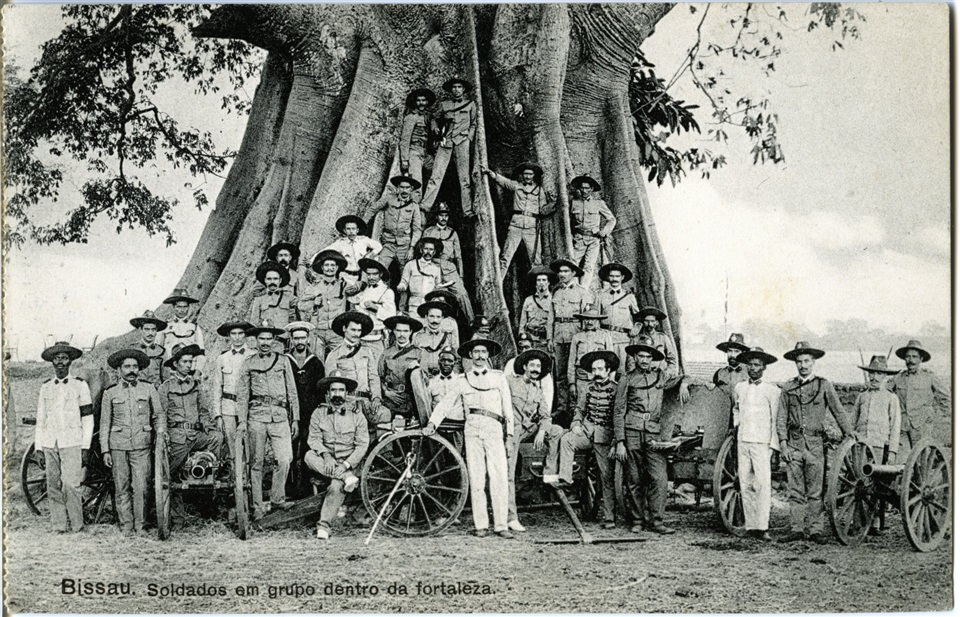
Portuguese soldiers in Bissau in the 1900s.

A third campaign followed still in 1914, in May, against the Balanta of Mansoa. The Portuguese suffered a setback in Bamba, but operations continued. One of the largest and most contested battles in the history of Guinea-Bissau took place in this campaign against the Balanta, who assembled in large numbers but suffered heavy casualties. Nevertheless, the campaign was concluded successfully by July. The king of Bassarel was arrested, over 4200 firearms were apprehended and posts were erected at Caió and Churobrinque, along with a school.

The Portuguese governor of Guinea Josué de Oliveira Duque declared a state of siege in Bissau on 13 May 1915, and shortly afterwards a campaign was launched against the Papel, who threatened the city. Portuguese reinforcements were brought into Bissau on June 3, but that same day the Papel and Grumetes scattered the Portuguese-allied auxiliaries and irregulars stationed at Intim. They then attacked Bissau but were repulsed. The heights of Intim Bandim were occupied by the Portuguese on June 5 after an artillery bombardment and a camp set up there. The camp was unsuccessfully attacked by the Papel and Grumetes on June 7, and Antula was then occupied on June 10. As the Portuguese moved through the villages, Pinto was wounded and replaced with Sousa Guerra. The occupation of Quinhamel allowed the opening of a road to Biombo, where the campaign came to a close, on August 17. Posts were then built at or Bijemita, Safim and Biombo.

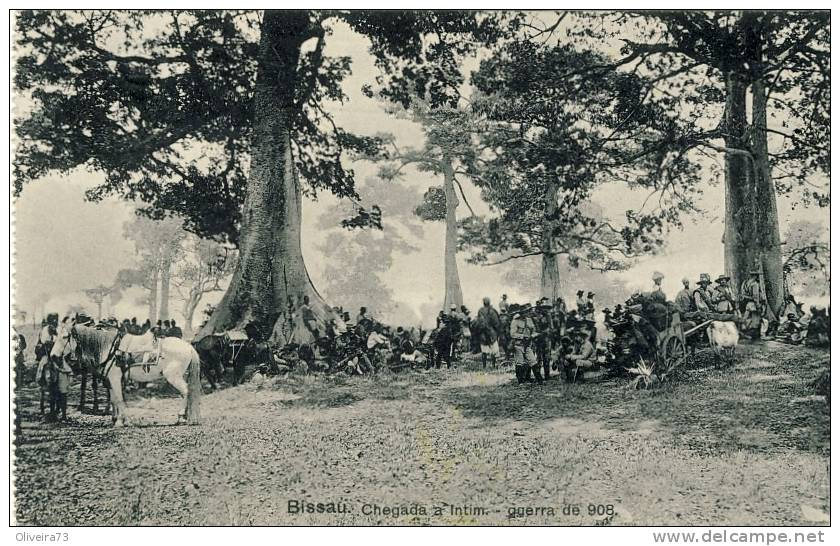
Portuguese troops at the village of Intim on campaign in 1908.

The campaigns of Teixeira Pinto thus concluded the pacification of mainland Guinea. This was followed by the establishment of military, administrative and tax-collecting posts across the interior, along with the construction of a network of roads. Abdul Injai had been a fervorous supporter of Portugal during these campaigns but he rebelled in Oio in 1919 and was captured. The last independent animists in the northwest and in the Bijago Islands were pacified between 1925 and 1936, the last campaign of pacification having taken place in Canhabaque, whose inhabitants engaged in piracy.

Guinea proved to be the most challenging theatre of war for Portugal, and between 1841 and 1936 the Portuguese government invested more than 8,000 soldiers in its occupation, half the number deployed in Mozambique. They were supported by 2,000 militiamen, while the native kings of Guinea supported Portugal with more than 40,000 auxiliary warriors, most of them Muslim Fulas, Mandingas and Biafadas.

== Assessment ==
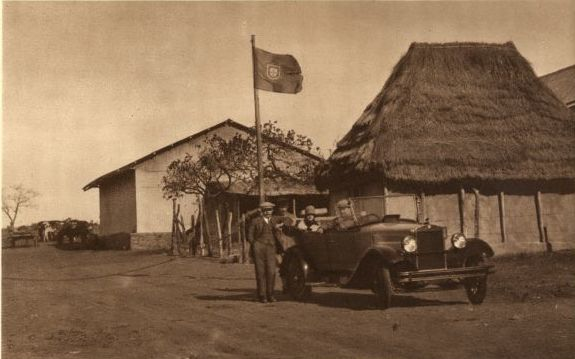
Goba border post between Portuguese Mozambique and British Swaziland.

The campaigns of pacification and occupation were marked above all by the few means with which Portugal pursued its objectives on one hand, and the exceptional level of native collaboration on the other. The scarcity of resources was compensated by the importance of the colonies in Portuguese politics compared to other European powers, where they were a much more secondary concern.

In Africa, the conditions that allowed the Portuguese to succeed developed decades before they began in earnest. Trade with the Europeans brought wealth, but it also eroded native societies. The proliferation of firearms caused wildlife to be decimated by over-hunting, which in turn resulted in increasingly bloody disputes for dwindling stocks. Ivory hunting and slave raiding became gradually more violent and caused growing instability, clearly noticeable by the 1870s. In southern Angola, the increasingly autocratic and onerous rule of Ovambo kings caused many to migrate to Portuguese or German territory, a trend that intensified as the surrounding lands gradually fell under Portuguese rule, which prevented the Ovambo from raiding their neighbours, and as severe drought destroyed herds and cattle pastures.

While many great African states in Angola showed signs of erosion by the early 19th century already, by the 1880s disintegration was widespread. At the same however, newer groups arose that were able to resist the Portuguese more effectively than the centralized empires they replaced, like the Dembos and Chokwe.

The construction of military posts sometimes provoked a reaction from nearby villages which was easily overcome, while in others the Portuguese garrison received the support of the locals who expected protection from neighbouring attacks, but in most cases it was met with indifference. Native resistance was always local in character, disunity prevalied and there was "simply no common conscience of a common struggle against a common foe."

The Portuguese had access to sophisticated equipment such as gunboats, saber-armed cavalry, magazine rifles, machineguns and cannon. However, their greater unity, organization and ability to bring significant portions of the native population to their side seem to have been decisive factors in tipping the scales of conflict in their favour. A ban on the sale of firearms in 1912 also proved decisive in undermining native resistance. Portuguese officer and historian Carlos Bessa considered that manpower, financial or organizational shortages were ultimately overcome through an effective combination of diplomacy and warfare. Ultimately, the pacification campaigns were of moderate intensity and local alliances vital.

=== The effects of drought, famine and pestilence ===
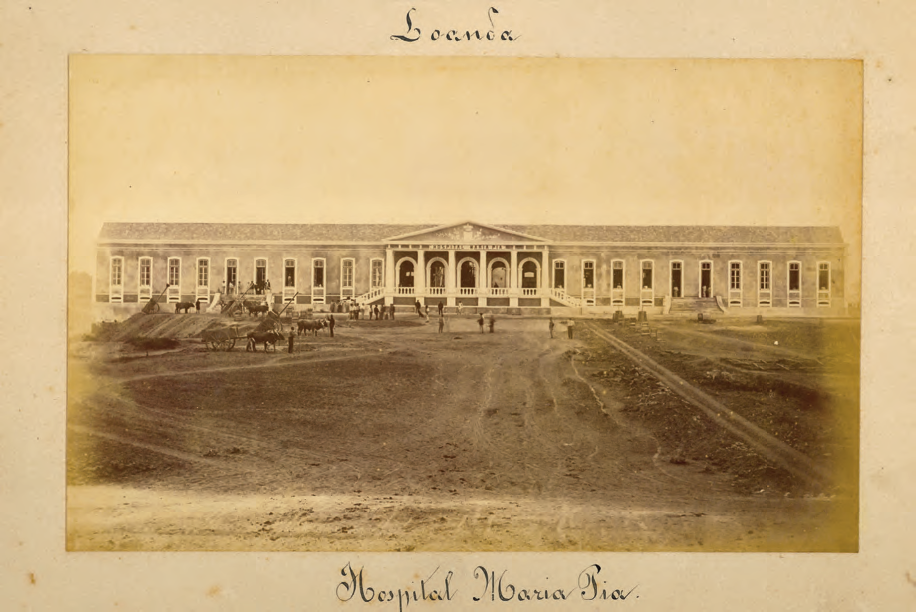
Maria Pia Hospital in Luanda in 1870, today Josina Machel Hospital.

European conquests in Africa coincided with a period of environmental and epidemological disaster in Africa. In east-Africa, epidemics decimated the cattle herds in the Gaza Empire in the 1890s. Famine and epidemics struck Angola particularly hard in the 1890s, 1900s, and 1910s, and native societies were debilitated by a series of devastating droughts and outbreaks of disease in the 1890s.

Rinderpest spread to Angola in the late 1890s and by 1899 it had destroyed over 90% of herds in the south, center and east, the effects of this epidemic being aggravated by locust swarms that devastated crops in the Moçâmedes and Lunda regions in 1898. They were followed by an outbreak of smallpox, that apparently began in Viye in 1901 and spread to all parts of Angola through Ovimbundu porters. Mortality was high everywhere, and Catholic missionaries "fought a losing battle to persuade Africans of the benefits of enoculation" in southern Angola and Luanda. The 1900s and 1910s were marked by an uninterrupted sequence of drought, flood and locust swarms, the worst effects having been felt in the south of Angola, where they culminated in the great famines of 1911 and 1916.

Starvation in southern Angola between 1911 and 1916 facilitated Portuguese victory over the Cuanhama in 1915. An uninterrupted epidemic of sleeping sickness also spread through the north between the 1890s and 1910s, and Portuguese military commanders recognized that it played an important part in allowing them to control the Dembos by 1919. These disasters weakened African polities at a moment Portuguese military activity was at their highest, and in some cases, losses of manpower and cattle hastened defeat.

=== Native collaboration ===
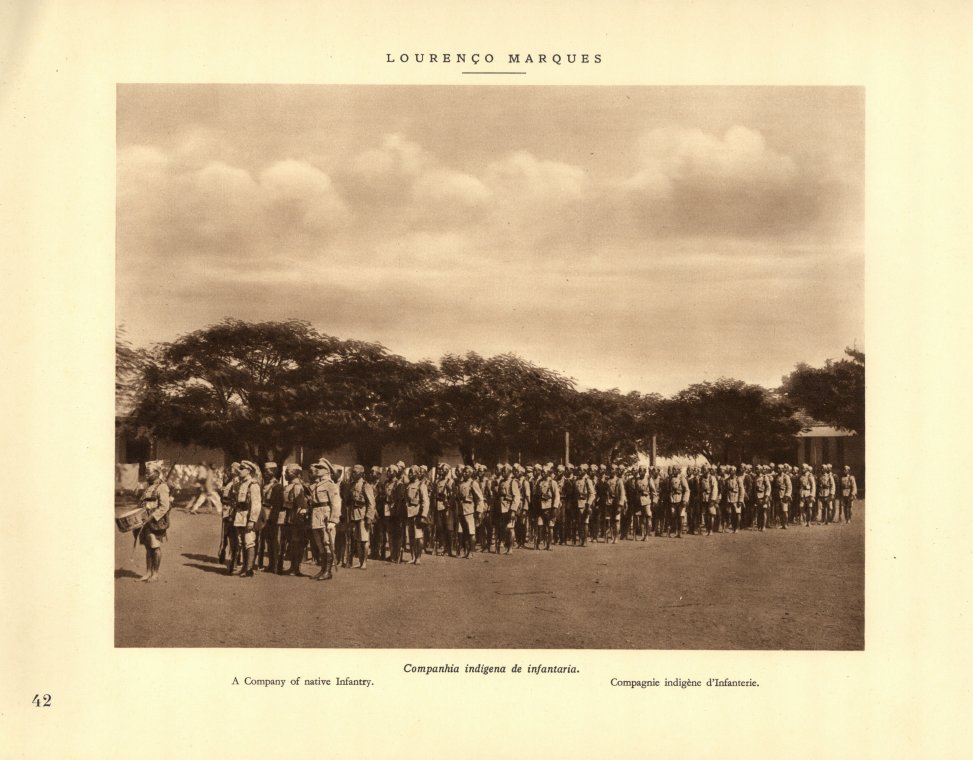
Native infantry company in Mozambique.

The Portuguese campaigns in Angola, Guinea, Mozambique and Timor depended to a major degree on the cooperation of native allies, whether as professional regular army soldiers, militiamen, allied rulers, auxiliary warriors, guides and carriers.

Most Portuguese troops overseas were stationed in widely scattered garrisons and seldom could as many as 100 Europeans be assembled for any operation. Yet Portugal had long cultivated allies and at different times most chiefs and various ethnic groups saw an advantage in cooperating with the Portuguese administration. The coming of European rule represented an opportunity to advance personal or group interests for many. Portuguese policy-makers generally favoured the use of African soldiers in Angola, Guinea and Mozambique in both war as well as peacetime. Campaigns often consisted of 70-80% African soldiers and the remaining European Portuguese, and though the percentage varied by time and territory, Portugal deployed many more native troops than European. Governor Guilherme Augusto de Brito Capelo praised the African irregulars as essential to Portuguese survival in Angola, and he sought to improve training and recruitment. Portugal had the "longest, most obscure and most complex" history of use of African troops, which had served the Portuguese state since the 16th century.

From the start therefore, the campaigns were carried out using African troops and irregulars recruited from among people willing to cooperate with the Portuguese administration. The level of native collaboration with Portugal was "striking, and has to be stressed." With few exceptions, like the Gaza campaign in 1895, every campaign in Africa ultimately "depended for its success on the black troops who fought under the Portuguese flag".

Though a critical part of the pacification campaigns, native cooperation with the Portuguese remains largely ignored and unacknowledged in contemporary Angola, Mozambique and Guinea-Bissau.

== See also ==
- Scramble for Africa
- Portuguese Military History
- Portuguese Angola
- Portuguese Guinea
- Portuguese Mozambique
- Portuguese Colonial War

== Bibliography ==
- Matias, Diogo (2010). "As operações militares de manutenção do Império Português em África: Uma visão sobre as tácticas usadas na perspectiva da doutrina actual" (PDF).
- Newitt, Malyn (1995). A History of Mozambique, Indiana University Press.
- Telo, António José (2004). Moçambique - 1895: A Campanha de Todos os Heróis, Tribuna da História.
- Regalado, Jaime Ferreira (2004). Cuamatos 1907: Os Bravos do Mufilo no Sul de Angola, Tribuna da História.
- Teixeira, Nuno Severiano (2019). The Portuguese at War: From the Nineteenth Century to the Present Day, Liverpool University Press.
- Vandervort, Bruce (2006). Wars of Imperial Conquest in Africa, 1830–1914, Taylor and Francis.
- Oliver, Roland; Sanderson, G. N., eds. (1985). The Cambridge History of Africa, Volume 6: From 1870 to 1905. Cambridge University Press. ISBN 978-0-521-22803-9. OCLC 59237801.
