= South West Africa campaign =

Military campaign

West Africa campaign
- Part of African theatre of World War I
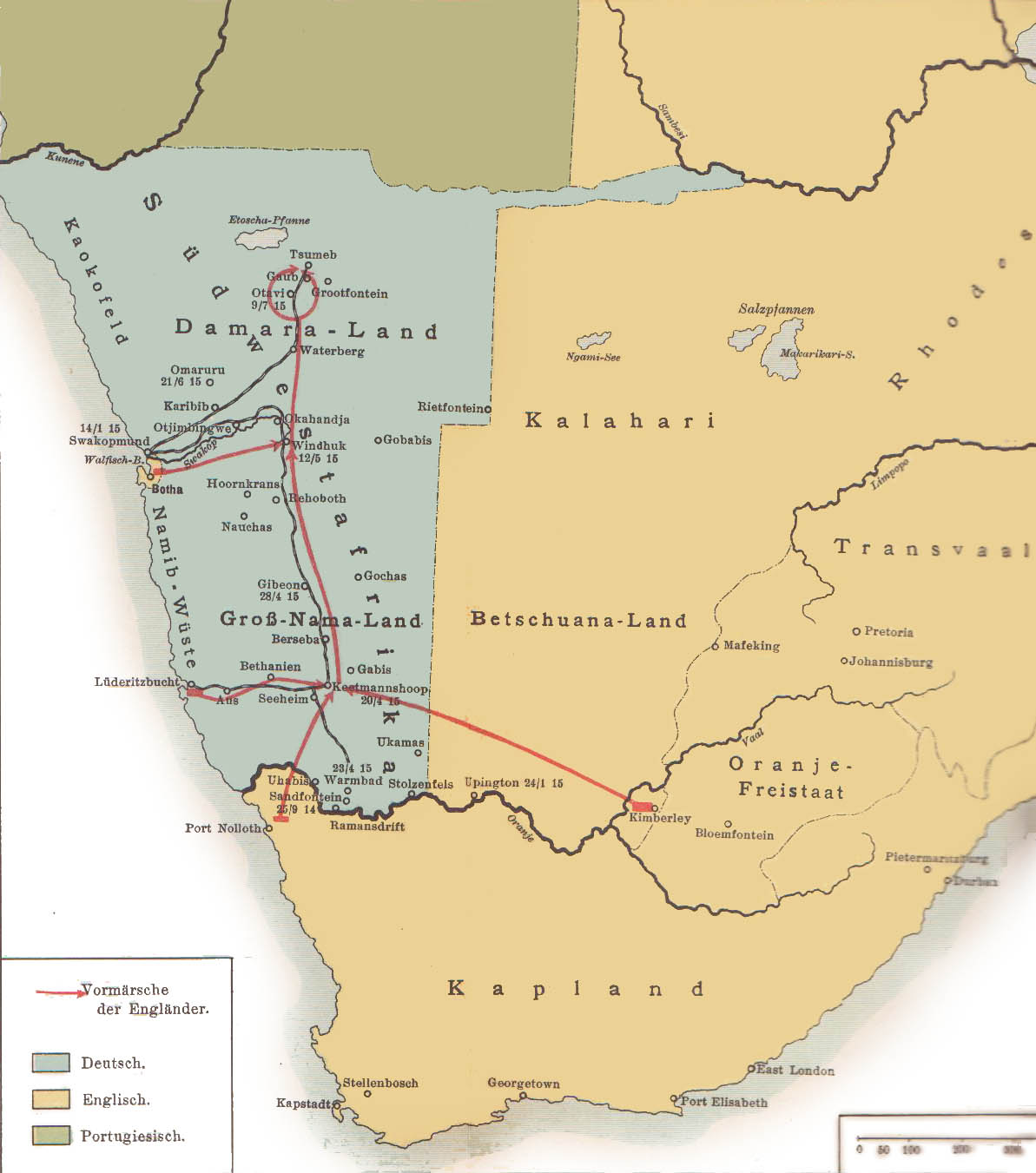
- The South West Africa campaign in 1915
Date	15 September 1914 – 9 July 1915; (9 months, 3 weeks and 3 days)
Location	South Africa, German South West Africa (now Namibia)
Result	Allied victory
Territorial changes	South West Africa annexed to the Union of South Africa

Belligerents
British Empire; South Africa; Portugal; Angola	Germany; South West Africa; South African Republic Oukwanyama

Commanders and leaders
(Union of South Africa) Jan Smuts; (Union of South Africa) Louis Botha; (First Portuguese Republic) José Roçadas; (First Portuguese Republic) António de Eça	(German South West Africa) Theodor Seitz; (German South West Africa) Victor Franke; (German South West Africa) Joachim Heydebreck †; (South African Republic) Manie Maritz; (South African Republic) Christiaan de Wet (POW); (South African Republic) Christiaan Beyers †; (South African Republic) Jan Kemp (surrendered); Mandume ya Ndemufayo †

Strength
67,000 South Africans; 12,000 Portuguese	3,000 Schutztruppe; 7,000 German militia & settlers 12,000 Boer commandos

Casualties and losses
Union of South Africa: 246 killed; 560 wounded; 782 captured; 181 dead from illness; Portuguese Angola: 810 killed; 683 wounded; 268 missing or captured	German South West Africa: 103 killed; 890 captured; 37 field guns lost; 22 machine-guns lost; South African Republic: 124–190 killed; 300 dead from illness; 229–400 wounded; Ovambo: 25 killed; 100 wounded

The South West Africa campaign was the conquest and occupation of German South West Africa by forces from the Union of South Africa acting on behalf of the British imperial government at the beginning of the First World War. The South African Prime Minister Louis Botha took the unusual move of leading his troops into battle as commander-in-chief, to the frustration of his cabinet.

== Background ==
The outbreak of hostilities in Europe in August 1914 had been anticipated and government officials of South Africa were aware of the significance of their common border with the German colony. Prime Minister Louis Botha informed London that South Africa could defend itself and that the Imperial Garrison might depart for France; when the British government asked Botha whether his forces would invade German South West Africa, the reply was yes. South African troops were mobilised along the border between the two countries under the command of General Henry Lukin and Lieutenant-Colonel Manie Maritz early in September 1914. Shortly afterwards another force occupied the port of Lüderitz. The news about the start of the First World War reached German South West Africa on 2 August 1914 via radio-telegraphy. The information was transmitted from the Nauen station via a relay station in Kamina and Lomé in Togo to the radio station in Windhoek.

== Boer revolt ==
There was considerable sympathy among the Boer population of South Africa for the German cause. Only twelve years had passed since the end of the Second Boer War, in which Germany had offered the two Boer republics unofficial support in their war with the British Empire. Lieutenant-Colonel Manie Maritz, heading commando forces on the border of German South West Africa, declared that

The former South African Republic and Orange Free State, as well as the Cape Province and Natal, are proclaimed free from British control and independent, and every [all] White inhabitant[s] of the mentioned areas, of whatever nationality, are hereby called upon to take their weapons in their hands and realise the long-cherished ideal of a Free and Independent South Africa.

— Manie Maritz.

Maritz and several other high-ranking officers rapidly gathered forces with a total of about 12,000 rebels in the Transvaal and Orange Free State, ready to fight for the cause in what became known as the Maritz rebellion. The government declared martial law on 14 October 1914 and forces loyal to the government under the command of generals Louis Botha and Jan Smuts proceeded to destroy the rebellion. Maritz was defeated on 24 October and took refuge with the Germans; the rebellion was suppressed by early February 1915. The leading Boer rebels received terms of imprisonment of six and seven years and heavy fines; two years later they were released from prison, as Botha recognised the value of reconciliation.

== German and South African hostilities ==
A first attempt to invade German South West Africa from the south failed at the Battle of Sandfontein, close to the border with the Cape Colony, where on 26 September 1914 German colonial forces defeated the Union Defence Force (UDF), although the surviving UDF troops were left free to return to South Africa. To disrupt South African plans to invade German South West Africa again, the Germans invaded South Africa and the Battle of Kakamas took place over the fords at Kakamas, on 4 February 1915 for control of two fords over the Orange River. The South Africans prevented the Germans from gaining control of the fords and crossing the river.

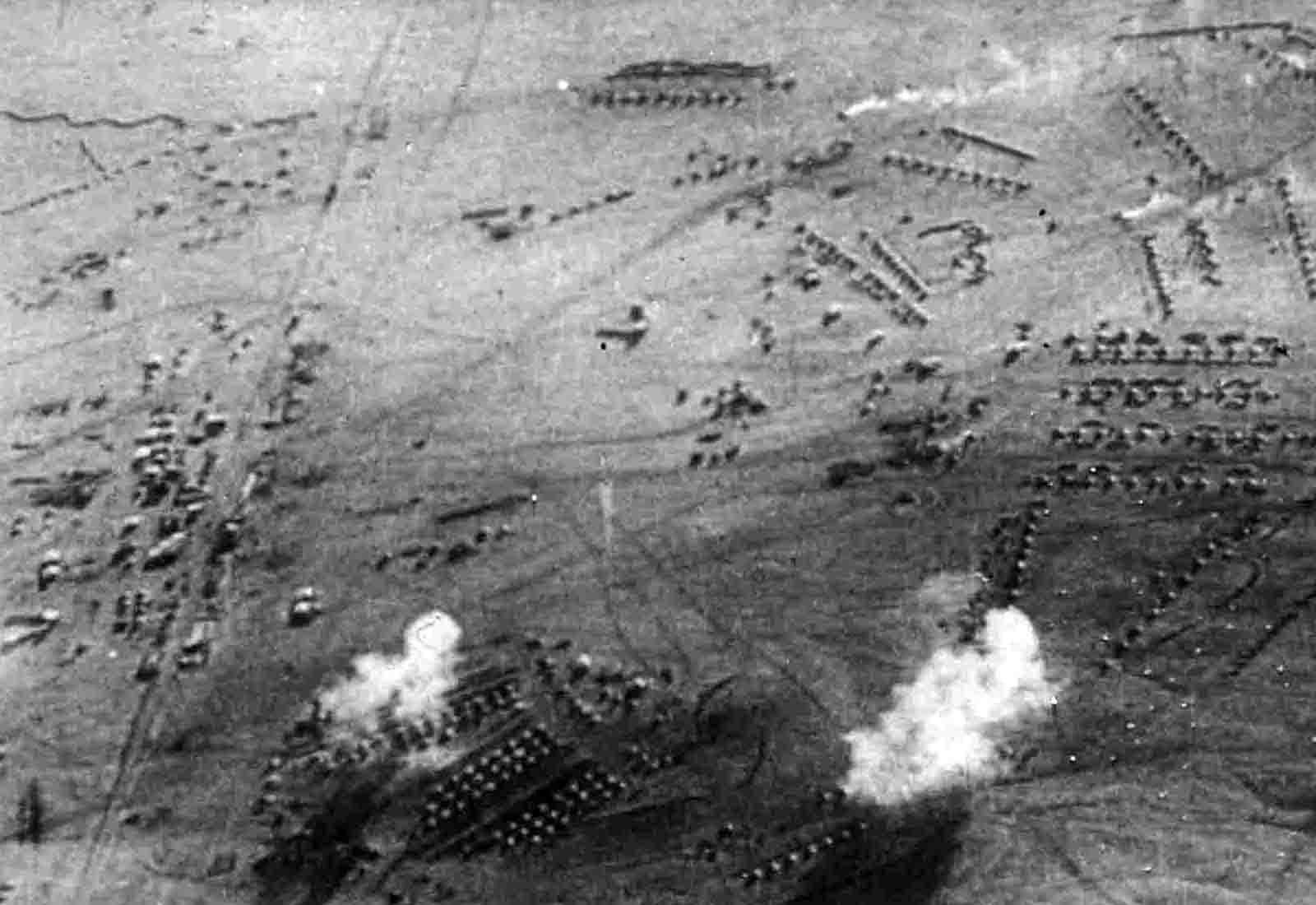
December 1914: German air raid on an Allied camp at the railway station of Tschaukaib

By February 1915, with the home front secure, the South Africans were ready to invade again. Botha, as a senior and experienced military commander, took command of the invasion, with Smuts commanding the southern forces while he led the northern forces. Botha arrived at the German colonial town of Swakopmund on the coast, on 11 February to take direct command on the northern contingent and continued to build up his invasion force at Walvis Bay a South African enclave about halfway along the coast of German South West Africa. In March he advanced from Swakopmund along the Swakop valley with its railway line and captured Otjimbingwe, Karibib, Friedrichsfelde, Wilhelmsthal and Okahandja, reaching the capital Windhuk on 5 May 1915.

The Germans offered terms under which they would surrender but Botha refused them. On 12 May Botha declared martial law and having cut the colony in half, divided his forces into four contingents under Coen Brits, Lukin, Manie Botha and Myburgh. Brits went north to Otjiwarongo, Outjo and Etosha Pan which cut off German forces in the interior from the coastal regions of Kunene and Kaokoveld. The other three columns fanned out into the north-east. Lukin went along the railway line running from Swakopmund to Tsumeb. The other two columns advanced on Lukin's right flank, Myburgh to Otavi junction and Manie Botha to Tsumeb and the line's terminus. The men who commanded these columns, having fought in Boer commandos, moved rapidly. The German forces in the north-west made a stand at the Battle of Otavi on 1 July but were beaten and surrendered at Khorab on 9 July 1915.

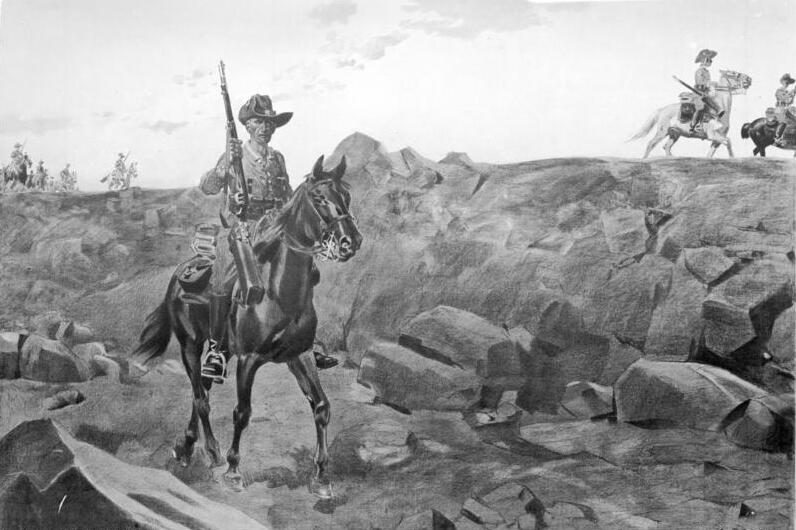
German mounted troops in South West Africa

Smuts landed with another South African force at the naval base at Lüderitzbucht (Lüderitz Bay). Having secured the town Smuts advanced inland, capturing Keetmanshoop on 20 May. Here he met two columns that had advanced over the border from South Africa, one from the coastal town of Port Nolloth and the other from Kimberley. Smuts advanced north along the railway line to Berseba and after two days fighting captured Gibeon on 26 May. The Germans in the south were forced to retreat northwards towards their capital and Botha's forces. Within two weeks the German forces in the south were faced with certain destruction and Governor Sietz surrendered at Korab, north of Windhoek, on 9 July 1915. When the Germans provided lists of the names of approximately 2,200 troops under their command, Botha told the German delegation that he had been tricked, as he knew that the Germans had 15,000 men. Victor Franke, the German commander, replied, "If we had 15,000 men then you wouldn't be here and we wouldn't be in this position".

== German and Portuguese hostilities ==
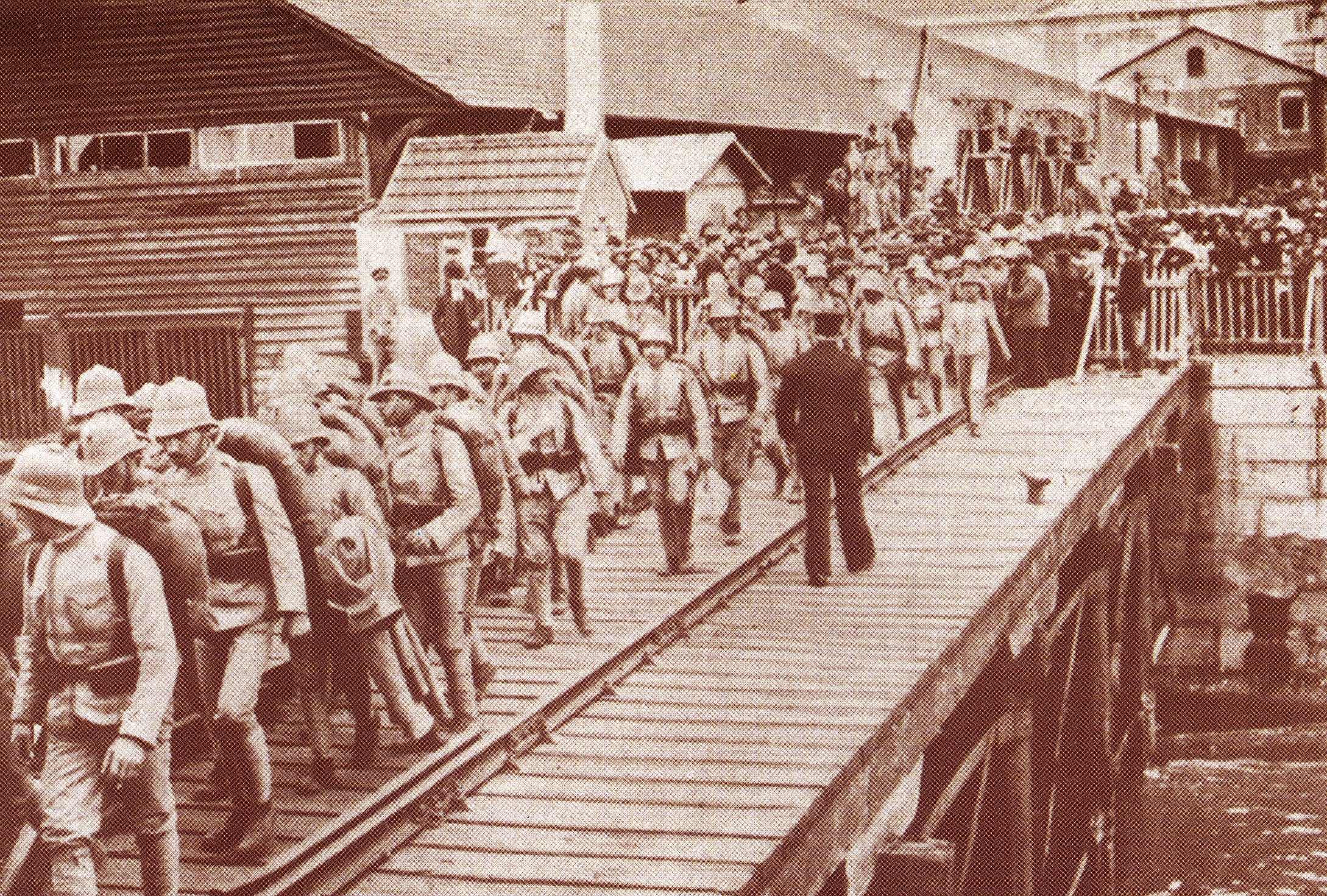
Portuguese troops embarking for southern Angola

Before an official declaration of war between Germany and Portugal (March 1916), in the German campaign in Angola German and Portuguese troops fought several times on the border between German South West Africa and Portuguese Angola. The Germans won most of these clashes and were able to occupy the Humbe region in southern Angola until Portuguese control was restored a few days before the successful South African campaign defeated the Germans. The German offensive into Angola spurred the native Ovambo to revolt against Portuguese rule. The ensuing Ovambo Uprising was not fully suppressed by Portuguese and British forces until after the end of the war.

== Aftermath ==
=== Casualties ===
South African casualties were 113 killed, 153 died of injury or illness and 263 wounded. (Note: In the official history, J. J. Collyer, the official historian, wrote that the Union forces suffered 88 men killed, 25 died of wounds, 153 died of injuries and illness and 263 men were wounded.) German casualties were 103 killed, 890 taken prisoner, 37 field guns and 22 machine-guns captured.

=== Post-war ===
After defeating the German force in South West Africa, South Africa occupied the colony and then administered it as a League of Nations mandate territory from 1919. Although the South African government desired to incorporate South West Africa into its territory, it never officially did so, although it was administered as the de facto fifth province, with the white minority having representation in the whites-only Parliament of South Africa, as well as electing their own local administration the SWA Legislative Assembly. The South African government also appointed the SWA administrator, who had extensive powers. When the League was superseded by the United Nations in 1946, South Africa refused to surrender the mandate as a trust territory, and the United Nations General Assembly revoked it. In 1971 the International Court of Justice issued an "advisory opinion" declaring South Africa's administration to be illegal.
