= Ovambo Uprising =

Ovambo rebellion against Portuguese colonial rule

- Part of South West Africa Campaign of World War I
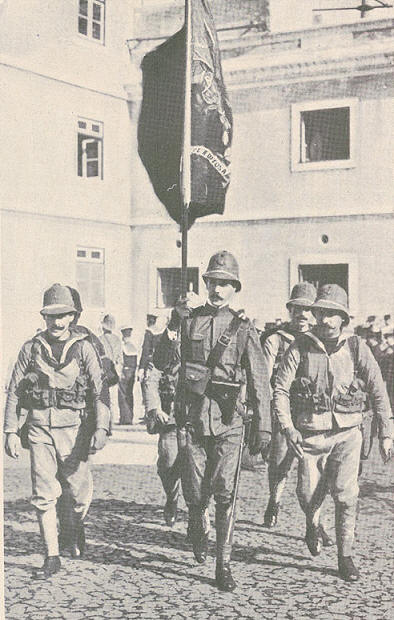
- Portuguese naval infantry in 1915. These soldiers were sent to Angola and fought in Mongua. (Photo by Joshua Benoliel)
Date	18 December 1914 – 6 February 1917
Location	Southern Portuguese Angola
Result	Portuguese victory
Territorial changes	Portuguese sovereignty in southern Angola restored

Belligerents
Portugal; (Portugal) Portuguese Angola; United Kingdom; South Africa (from 1917)	Ovambo; Supported by: Germany

Commanders and leaders
(Portugal) Alves Roçadas (Portugal) Pereira d'Eça (Union of South Africa) Colonel de Jager	Mandume ya Ndemufayo †; Calola

Strength
(Portugal) 5,000 (Portugal) <1,000 African auxiliaries (Union of South Africa) 700	50,000 – 150,000 (<20,000 fully armed)

Casualties and losses
(Portugal) 52 killed (18–20 August 1915; October 1916) (Portugal) 57 wounded	25 killed (18–20 August 1915); 100 wounded

The Ovambo Uprising was an uprising against Portuguese colonial rule during World War I. It lasted from 18 December 1914 to 6 February 1917 with the death of its leader, King Mandume yaNdemufayo, by South African forces in Namibia. The war pitted Portuguese troops, commanded by General António Júlio da Costa Pereira de Eça, against an Ovambo army, composed mainly of fighters from the Oukwanyama clan.

== Background ==
Before the Scramble for Africa, the area of Southern Angola was owned by the Kwanyama Kingdom. The Berlin agreements of 1884 split the kingdom and the larger Ovambo ethnic group as a whole between two colonial powers, without any say from the native people in Angola. However, none of the two powers would attempt occupation or administration for at least two decades. All Portuguese efforts to subjugate the Ovambo were unsuccessful until the conquest of Ombandja in 1907 and Evale in 1912 during the Portuguese campaign against the Ovambo. The reason the Ovambo were so hard to subjugate was that they were well-armed and too formidable to even try to conquer such an economically unpromising region, especially before 1907.

Despite the Brussels Conference Act of 1890, which made it illegal to sell gun and ammunition to Africans, traders from both Germany and Portugal continued to smuggle in weapons, alcohol, ivory, and cattle into Ovamboland (the area made up of ethnic Ovambo). Ovambo leaders sought guns above all else in their dealings with merchants since they needed them for their raids. Due to decades of these illegal arms trades, many of the Ovambo kingdoms owned large numbers of guns and their military capacity was not to be underestimated. Almost every Ovambo owned a gun, and a revolt even broke out there a decade before. The German and Portuguese had tried to stop the trading of arms but were unable to do so. This all changed when Mandume rose to power in 1911. Mandume expelled all traders from his kingdom because of the colonial intrusion which threatened his sovereignty, while other Kingdoms were still welcoming to traders.

== Prelude ==
=== German-kwanyama Relations ===
Mandume rejected the idea of Portuguese colonial rule and demanded to be on equal terms with the colonial rulers in their distant capitals. Mandume also sought close relations with the Germans despite them owning the southern half of his kingdom. He even went as far as to describe the governor of German South West Africa, Theodor Seitz, as his "brother in Windhuk."

In August 1914, Outjo District Governor Hans Schultze-Jena reported suspected British troop movements, or at least growing British influence in Angola, to Governor Seitz via a telegram. Schultze-Jena told Seitz that there were rumors the Portuguese were trying to turn the Ovambo against German colonial rule. Despite confirmation of these allegations, Seitz went ahead and sent a letter to Mandume, telling him that German forces would support him if he was ever attacked by the Portuguese. The letter also promised 100 guns plus ammunition to Mandume which was never given. The next month Seitz sent another letter with the same offer in it plus wine. The letter also talked about Germany's "great victories" in Europe, assuring Mandume that if he stayed "faithful to the Germans you need not fear the Portuguese. If they attack you, I will send German troops to expel them." The guns were not to be delivered unless the Portuguese joined the British and invaded Ovamboland.

=== German campaign in Angola ===
In October 1914, Seitz attempted to give Mandume the one hundred outmoded M 71 rifles, but he was advised by the government's native commissioner Hermann Tönjes to only send five rifles to Mandume and one to each of the other three Ovambo kings. Mandume thanked Seitz for the promised guns and assured him of his allegiance to the Germans. Seitz also asked if Mandume's men would join his forces at Naulila, but it never happened. The next month on November 5, Mandume allegedly told then-district governor José Augusto Alves Roçadas that the Germans were going to attack Angola. This would turn out to be both incorrect and correct as the Germans would come back to Angola, but it was the next month.

The very next month the German army would gain a major victory at the Battle of Naulila. It was a severe defeat for Portuguese forces and showed off "German military brilliance". The victory in their region impressed the Ovambos and encouraged them to consider that the time had come to shake off the yoke of the Portuguese colonial occupier. But no rebellion came until governor Roçadas started to fall victim to the notions of "German military brilliance" and fearing an envelopment moved most of his troops out of the Ovambo region and towards Humbe, leaving behind 1,000 rifles and 4 machine guns. Fueled by their hatred of Alves Roçadas, Portugal's military weakness, and famine, the entire Ovambo region revolted against Portugal.

== Rebellion ==
=== Angola ===
While Roçadas was distracted with the German threat to the west, Mandume was able to mobilize his forces and had his forces sacked Fort Kafima in late December. His men captured 3 Portuguese soldiers and sent them to N'giva. For this action, the governor of German South-West Africa gifted him 3 horses. Despite the lack of confrontation between the two sides in the early days of the war, Mandume quickly became the most powerful man in Ovamboland.

After this, the Portuguese didn't do much because of their war with the Germans and tried to limit clashes with the Ovambo for the time being. Everything changed on 12 August 1915 when Portuguese forces launched an offensive across the Kunene River with about 4 columns. The largest of those columns with about 2,700 men was commanded by Pereira de'Eça himself. Pereira de'Eça had taken 5,000 out of the 11,000 with him on this campaign. By the time the Portuguese got there, Ovambo's military capacity had already been reduced due to increased famine and social upheaval build-up over the years.

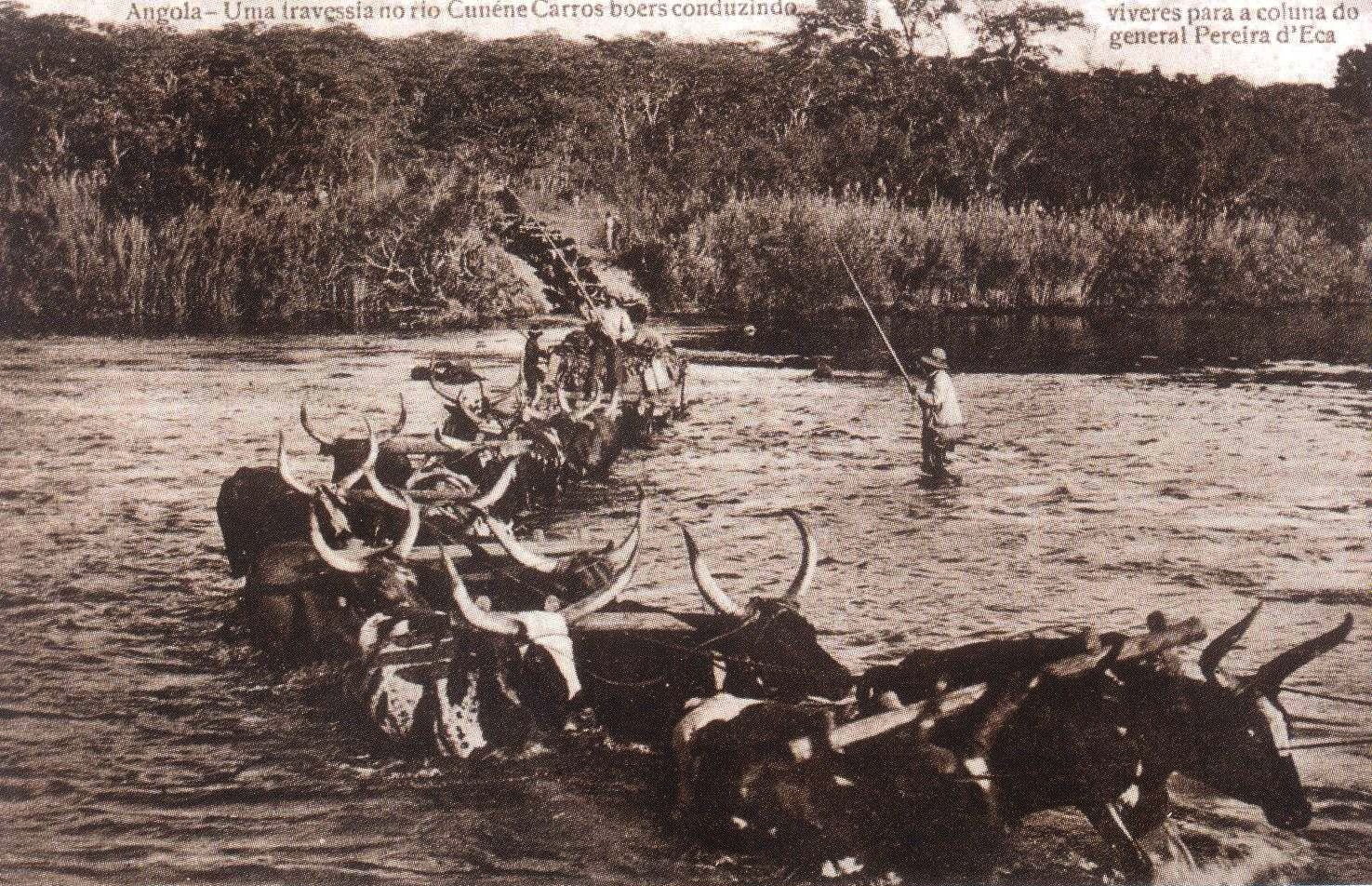
Boer ox-wagons carrying supplies to the Portuguese troops. The inscription reads: "A crossing in the Cunene. Boer wagons carrying supplies to general Pereira d'Eças column".

The main goal of this campaign was to reach Mandume in his royal residence at N'giva. In comparison to previous campaigns, Pereira de'Eça had an advantage as now he knew the area well. Mandume knew the Portuguese were coming for him, and instead of waiting for them to knock on his front door, he went to attack them before they could reach his home. Mandume had the advantage as his men could easily forge for food while Pereira de'Eça men were slow and lacked water. In the first few days, a large number of the cavalry's horses and pull-oxen fell victim to the drought.

On 15 August, a skirmish took place at an unknown area between the two forces with the Ovambo being "mostly armed as natives are" and had two cannons without ammunition. On 16 August, Portuguese cavalry and African auxiliaries spotted a build-up of Ovambo troops in Mongua, near a few small water-holes. Pereira de'Eça ordered his men towards that direction, and the next day they set up defensive positions just like Mandume's men.

On 18 August, a close friend of Mandume, Calola, with a force of Ovambo men attacked the eastern and northern flank with all force starting the Battle of Mongua. Pereira de'Eça's men responded with a rain shower of bullets for 3 hours. In total, one officer and 16 privates were killed on the Portuguese side. Afterward, the Ovambo surrounded the Portuguese forces and forced them to dig in. That same day the two fought over a water-hole because both were low on resources. The next day Mandume come to the area with reinforcements.

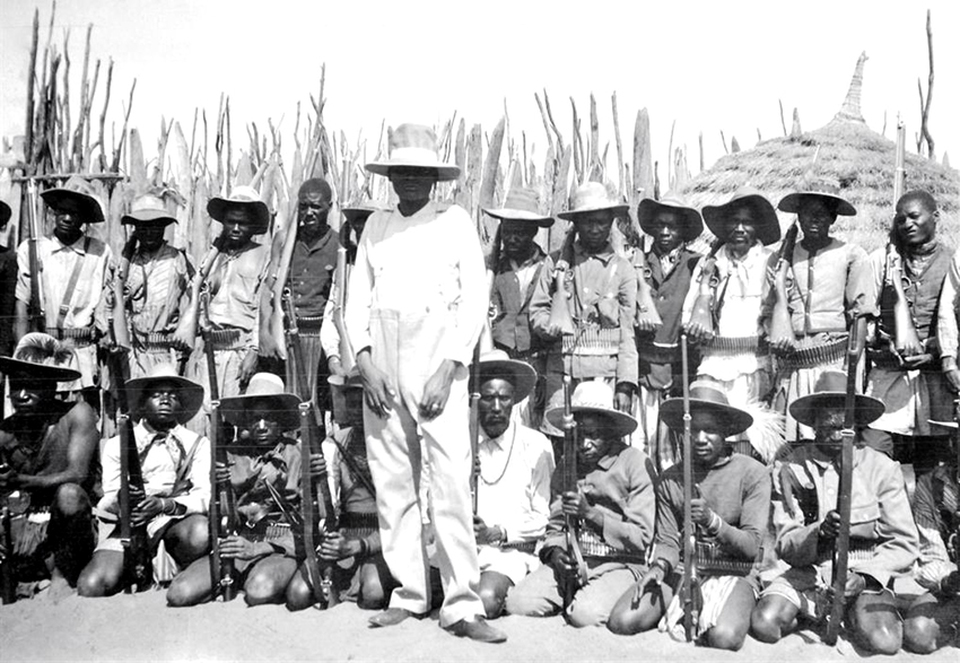
Mandume and his warriors.

On 20 August, Mandume assembled several thousand men and attacked the Portuguese camp shouting "The land does not belong to the white[s]!". After 10 hours of fighting, the Ovambo were forced to retreat due to a lack of supplies including the water which they had lost. In total, the Portuguese took 35 casualties and had 57 wounded. The Ovambo lost 25 and had 100 wounded. After the battle, the Portuguese also started claiming that German forces were helping the Ovambo because it was unimaginable to them that Africans were able to wage war like Europeans.

After the battle, the Portuguese forces were stranded in Mongua, as the majority of their horses and pull-oxen had died. Pereira de'Eça decided to wait for reinforcements instead of returning to Humbe because the last time Portuguese forces withdrew from the area, it didn't go so well for them. His forces at this point were immobilized and couldn't occupy the area. It was mere luck for the Portuguese that Mandume didn't attack their forces while they were there for the next 4 days. Instead, he wanted to save the ammunition and retreated to the border area. Finally, on August 24, a convoy from Cuamato and Naulila and a convoy from Evale met with Pereira de'Eça's forces in Mongua. Now, with 4,000 troops at his disposal, he ordered a fort in Mongua to be built and began to push southwards.

=== Namibia ===
Following his defeat at Mongua, Mandume fled to former German South West Africa, now under South African control. On September 2, the capital, N'giva, fell to Portuguese forces, ending Ovambo control of the majority of Southern Angola. He set up his new headquarters in a village called Oihole. From there, he kept fighting Portuguese forces in Southern Angola, but after a while, he withdrew his forces south because he recognized the tactical advantage the border gave him. The Portuguese demanded his extradition from Oihole, but he had "protection" in South Africa. However, he kept breaking the terms of South African "protection" by increasingly launching incursions into Angola. On one of these incursions in October 1916, his men ambushed a Portuguese patrol in Angola, killing 16 privates and an officer. This caught the attention of South African Prime Minister, General Louis Botha, who was upset by Mandume's actions and told him to explain himself at Windhoek. In response, Botha was told that Kwanyaman law prohibited the King from leaving his territory and that Mandume thought he had done nothing wrong.

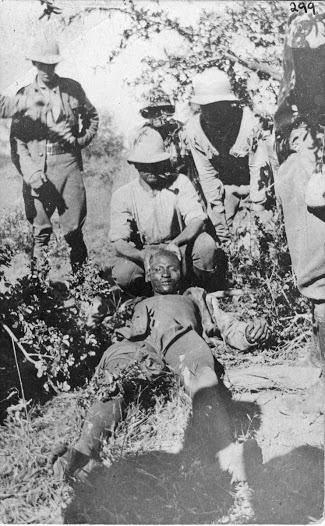
A dead Mandume next to South African soldiers.

In early 1917, open conflict erupted between Mandume and recently appointed South African Resident Commissioner Manning. Mandume said, "If the English want me, I am here [in Oihole] [...] I am a man, not a woman, and I will fight until my last bullet is expended." The South Africans, refusing joint operations with the Portuguese, who "thirst[ed] for his blood," sent a force of 700 soldiers under Colonel de Jager to depose Mandume. By this point, Manning, Lieutenant Carl Hugo L. Hahn, and allegedly Ndjukuma, whom the King had displaced from Oihole to Omhedi, had collected enough information to make a feasible open attack on Mandume. Finally, on 6 February 1917, machine-gun fire from South African forces killed Mandume near his embala in Oihole, ending the Ovambo Uprising. Oral history tells a different story. According to locals he actually died when he committed suicide after being wounded so he could not be taken in by the enemy. After his death, the South African administration abolished the Kwanyama-Kingship.

== See also ==
- Campaigns of Pacification and Occupation

== Works cited ==
- Birmingham, David (2015). A Short History of Modern Angola. Hurst & Co. p. 55.
- Hayes, Patricia (March 1993). "Order out of Chaos: Mandume Ya Ndemufayo and Oral History". Journal of Southern African Studies. 19 (1): 90. Bibcode:1993JSAfS..19...89H. doi:10.1080/03057079308708349. JSTOR 2636959.
- Strachan, Hew (2003). The First World War: Volume I: To Arms. Oxford University Press. pp. 558–559.
- Pélissier, René (1977). Les guerres grises: Résistance et revoltes en Angola, 1845–1941. Montamets/Orgeval: Éditions Pélissier. OCLC 4265731.
- Zollmann, Jakob (2016a). Naulila 1914. World War I in Angola and International Law. doi:10.5771/9783845271606. ISBN 9783845271606.
- Zollmann, Jakob (2016b). "Unforeseen combat at Naulila. German South West Africa, Angola, and the First World War in 1914–1917". Journal of Namibian Studies: History Politics Culture. 20: 79–112.
