= Kingdom of Humbe =

The Kingdom of Humbe, also known as the Humbe Kingdom, was an independent state that once existed in the territory that is now part of Angola. Its inhabitants belonged to the Nhaneca-Humbe ethnic group and were known as Humbes.

The kingdom was one of three Nhaneca-Humbe kingdoms, along with the Kingdom of Mulondo and the Kingdom of Camba. Of these three, only Humbe was considered powerful. It was originally founded by Ovimbundu and its military organisation was based on the quilombo.

The Humbe were mainly engaged in pastoralism and their traders sold mainly ivory. The Humbes made raids into the highlands to capture slaves from the neighbouring Huíla and Gambo populations, which they sold at the port of Benguela. Frequent wars between neighbouring peoples greatly reduced the population of the kingdom, and the Humbes both enslaved and were sold as slaves. Trade led to the arrival of Portuguese merchants and frontiersmen.

The land of Humbe is the richest in cattle of all those below the Cunene, which contributes to it being the largest and, consequently, least affected by wars; however, it is also the most proud of all, which must be influenced by its wealth. [...] From July or August until November or December, these lands are considered unsafe due to the continuous wars and attacks from Quanhama and its neighbours, as this is the time when the river is fordable in some places, and as the attackers do not use firearms, they do not give themselves away with the noise of weapons, suddenly attacking one or more villages that are closest to them and killing as many people as they find, fleeing with the cattle; this also happens in Humbe, which, being larger and richer, is also more persecuted.

In 1856, the Portuguese governor of Moçâmedes attacked Gambos and Humbe with 80 soldiers, 4 cannons and 50,000 warriors from the chiefdom of Dumba.

Portugal founded a fort in Humbe in 1859 at the request of chief Chingue, who, being old and on bad terms with his nephew and heir, invited the Portuguese to establish a military garrison in his kingdom to keep him in power. Despite complaining to the district governor António Joaquim de Castro, the nephew did not obtain any support from the Portuguese against his uncle, but he was assured that he would succeed him to the throne when Chingue died, so he killed him. An ultimatum and war followed, but the Portuguese managed to restore peace by expelling the nephew to Dongoena, and soba Onkole was acclaimed in his place. However, the fort had to be abandoned four years after its foundation due to a lack of resources to ensure its security. The fort was re-established in 1880. The Humbes went to war with the Portuguese on three occasions, from 1885 to 1888, in 1891 and from 1897 to 1898.

Abandoned by order of Alves Roçadas in late 1914 after the German attack on Naulila, Humbe was reoccupied by General Pereira d'Eça's troops on 7 July 1915 and definitively integrated into Portuguese Angola.

== See also ==
- Portuguese Angola
- Campaigns of Pacification and Occupation
