= German campaign in Angola =

1914–15 campaign of WWI in Africa

German Campaign in Angola
- Part of South West Africa campaign
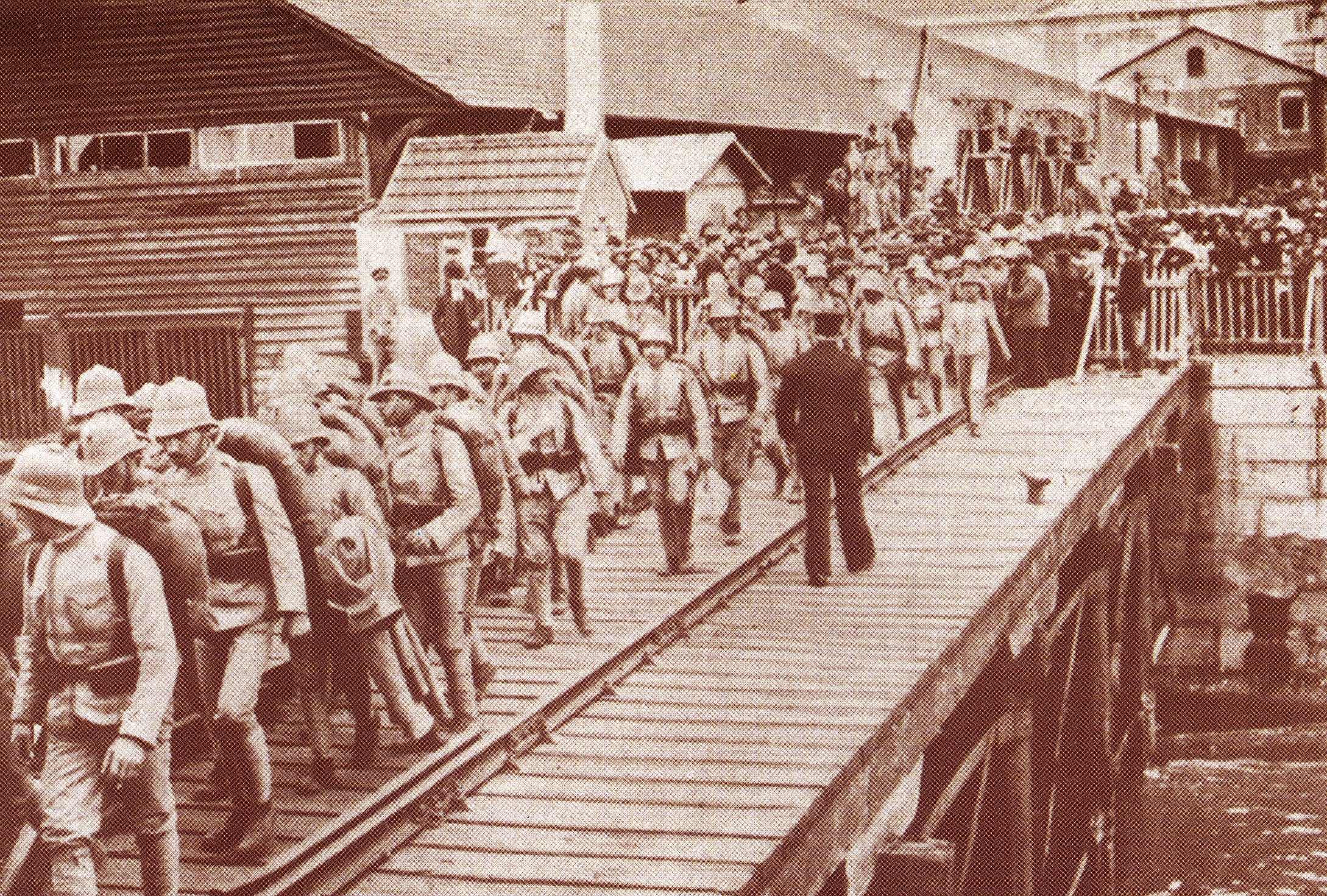
- Portuguese troops embarking for Angola
Date	18 October 1914 – 9 July 1915 (8 months and 3 weeks)
Location	Southern Portuguese Angola
Result	Portuguese victory

Belligerents
Germany: South West Africa	Portugal: (Portuguese Angola) Angola

Commanders and leaders
(German South West Africa) Joachim von Heydebreck †; (German South West Africa) Victor Franke	(First Portuguese Republic) Alves Roçadas; (First Portuguese Republic) Pereira d'Eça

Strength
2,000+	12,000

Casualties and losses
16+ killed 30–60 wounded	810 killed (mostly due to disease); 638 wounded 268 captured or missing
- 1 Portuguese civilian killed

The German campaign in Angola took place before the official declaration of war between Germany and Portugal in March 1916. German and Portuguese troops clashed several times on the border between German South West Africa and Portuguese Angola. The Germans won most of these clashes and were able to occupy the Humbe region of southern Angola until Portuguese control was restored a few days before the South African-led South West Africa campaign liquidated German rule in the region.

== Background ==
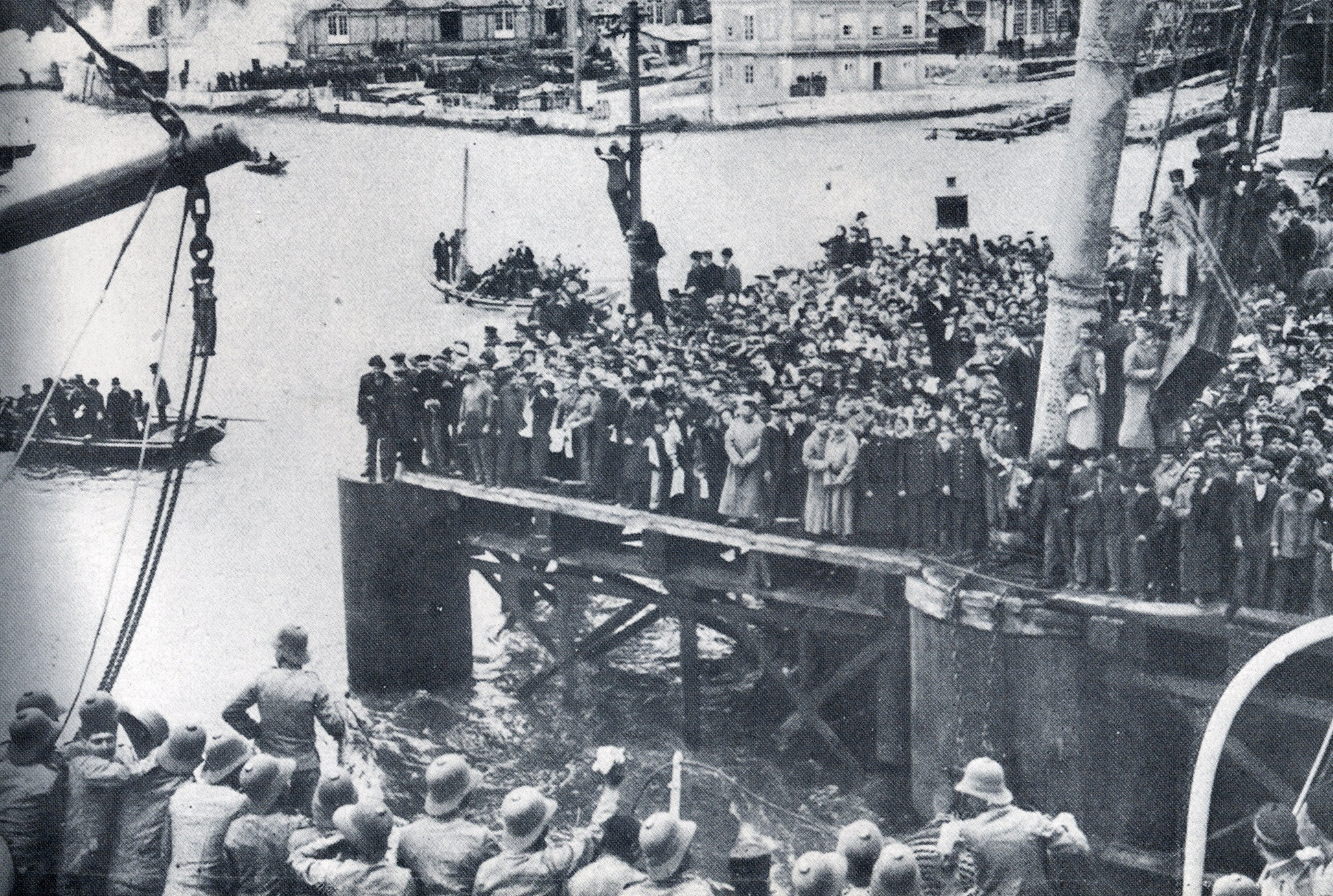
Portuguese troops embarking for Angola

From 1911 until July 1914, the German and British governments had held negotiations about the possibility of annexing Portuguese Angola. In such a case most of the colony would fall into the hands of the Germans. Angola-Bund, founded in 1912, was the German organization promoting the takeover.

Even before World War I started (September 1914), the Portuguese government had sent reinforcements to the southern border of Angola. After the war broke out, the border between German South West Africa and Angola remained open. The Germans hoped they would be able to supply food and possibly even arms through it. However, the Portuguese colonial government was rather hostile and attempted to thwart all possible trade. A few German nationals in Angola were interned.

== Campaign ==
Fighting in southern Portuguese Angola took place before a formal state of war had been declared between Germany and Portugal (Germany declared war on Portugal on 9 March 1916) when clashes occurred between October 1914 and July 1915.

Due to the possibility of an attack from German South West Africa, Portuguese forces in southern Angola were reinforced by a military expedition led by Lieutenant-Colonel Alves Roçadas, which arrived at Moçâmedes on 1 October 1914.

Since mid-1914, there had been several incidents between Portuguese and German troops. The first serious one was the Naulila incident on 19 October, in which 3 German officers, heading a military column which had entered Angola without permission from the Portuguese authorities, were killed by Portuguese troops. On 31 October, German troops armed with machine guns launched a surprise attack on the small Portuguese outpost at Cuangar, killing 2 officers, 1 sergeant, 5 soldiers and 1 civilian. The attack became known as the "Cuangar Massacre".

On 18 December the largest clash of the campaign occurred at the Battle of Naulila. A German force of 2,000 men under the command of Major Victor Franke attacked Portuguese forces positioned at Naulila. After stubborn resistance, the Portuguese were forced to withdraw towards the Humbe region, with 69 soldiers dead, among them 3 officers, 76 wounded, among them 1 officer, and 79 prisoners, among them 3 officers, while the Germans had 12 soldiers dead and 30 wounded, among them 10 officers. After the explosion of the munitions magazine at Forte Roçadas base, the Portuguese also left the Humbe, withdrawing farther north.

On 7 July 1915, Portuguese forces under the command of General Pereira d'Eça reoccupied the Humbe region. Two days later, German forces in South West Africa surrendered, ending the South West Africa Campaign.

Until September 1915, the Portuguese continued fighting in southern Angola against local groups who resisted colonial occupation, and who in part had received arms from the Germans.
