= Battle of Naulila =

Battle of the German campaign in Angola

- Part of the start of German campaign in Angola
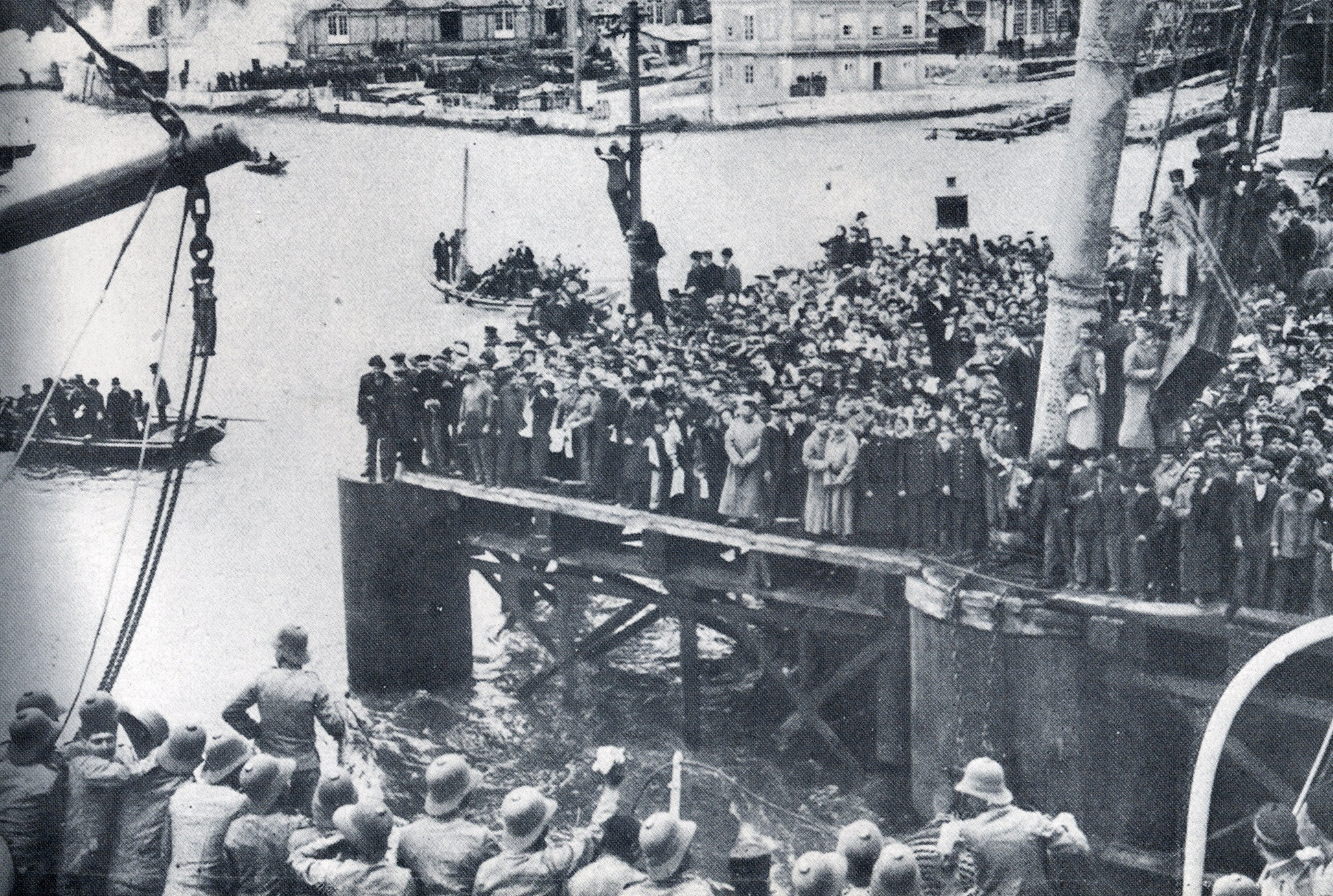
- Boarding Portuguese troops to Angola, during the 1st Arsenal Pier World War
Date	18 December 1914
Location	Naulila, Portuguese Angola 17°11′46″S 14°41′03″E
Result	German victory

Belligerents
Portuguese Angola	German South West Africa

Commanders and leaders
Alves Roçadas	Victor Franke (WIA)

Units involved
Portuguese Army	Schutztruppe

Strength
580 Infantry; 200 Cavalry	650 Infantry

Casualties and losses
Around 70	Around 30
- Location within Angola Battle of Naulila (Africa)

Naulila was the scene of fighting between Portuguese Angola and German South West Africa during the early stages of World War I. On 19 October 1914, a German military column crossed the border and entered Angola without authorization from the Portuguese authorities in the Naulila Incident. The column was intercepted by Portuguese forces and conducted to Fort Naulila. At Naulila, a dispute occurred between the Portuguese and the Germans which resulted in the death of three German officers. The Germans later returned on 18 December and attacked Naulila, forcing the Portuguese to retreat.

On 31 October, the Germans under the command of Oswald Ostermann retaliated, and raided the Portuguese fort at Cuangar, destroying the fort and killing all stationed border guards with machine-guns. This was later referred to as the "Cuangar Massacre". On 18/19 December, Victor Franke led another successful retaliatory attack, defeating the Portuguese at Naulila.

== Aftermath ==
Portuguese troops left the area and retreated into Portuguese territory. This resulted in several indigenous tribes revolting against Portuguese authority (they started to pillage and loot the area now vacant of Portuguese forces). Portugal sent a military expedition to suppress the insurgency and reoccupy the territory. As a result, more than 150,000 indigenous inhabitants died (including from tribes fighting against one another and a famine, due to an exceptional drought), more than 500,000 cattle were lost, and more than 180,000 hectares of crops were destroyed.

When Portugal claimed damages from Germany, the International Tribunal of Lausanne in 1928 ruled that German actions were unjustified, and Portugal was awarded compensation.
