= Reprisal =

When a state violates international laws to punish another state which already broke them

A reprisal is a limited and deliberate violation of international law to punish another sovereign state that has already broken them. Since the 1977 Additional Protocol I to the Geneva Conventions (AP 1), reprisals in the laws of war are extremely limited, as they commonly breach the rights of non-combatants.

== Etymology ==
The word came from French, where it originally meant "act of taking back", for example, raiding back the equivalent of cattle lost to an enemy raid.

== International law ==
Reprisals refer to acts which are illegal if taken alone, but become legal when adopted by one state in retaliation for the commission of an earlier illegal act by another state. ICRC’s Database of Customary International Humanitarian Law states in Rule 145: "Where not prohibited by international law, belligerent reprisals are subject to stringent conditions." "Counter-reprisals" are generally not allowed.

=== World War I ===
==== 1914 Portugal–Germany dispute ====
An example of reprisal is the Naulila dispute between Portugal and Germany in October 1914, when they were on opposite sides of the World War I chasm. After three Germans were mistakenly killed in Naulila on the border of the then-Portuguese colony of Angola (in a manner that did not violate international law), Germany carried out a military raid on Naulila, destroying property in retaliation. A claim for compensation was brought by Portugal. The tribunal emphasized that before reprisals could be legally undertaken, a number of conditions had to be satisfied:

- There had to be a previous act by the other party that violated international law.
- Reprisals had to be preceded by an unsatisfied demand for reparation or compliance with the violated international law.
- There must be proportionality between the offence and reprisal.

The German claim that it had acted lawfully was rejected on all three grounds.

=== Irish War of Independence ===
During the Irish War of Independence, reprisals were authorized by British authorities in areas of Ireland that were under martial law. From December 1920 until June 1921 approximately 150 official reprisals were carried out. In December 1920, Commander-in-Chief, Ireland Nevil Macready informed the Lloyd George ministry that military governors in areas under martial law had been authorized to conduct reprisals in response to attacks on local security forces, under these conditions:

Punishments will only be carried out on the authority of the Infantry Brigadier, who before taking action will satisfy himself that the people concerned were, owing to their proximity to the outrage or their known political tendencies, implicated in the outrage, and will give specific instructions in writing, or by telegram to the officer detailed to carry out the operation.

In 1921 Macready allowed for the blowing up of houses belonging to those implicated in attacks on British forces. Often, rebels would retaliate by burning large estates owned by Unionists. See Destruction of Irish country houses (1919–1923).

=== World War II ===
Bennett writes that the events of World War II can be seen through either the prism of negative reciprocity or the prism of reprisal. If the latter, "the rules also required that reprisals be used ‘only as an unavoidable last resort to induce the enemy to desist from illegitimate practices’".

The official 1940 American Rules of Land Warfare stated that "commanding officers must assume responsibility for retaliative measures when an unscrupulous enemy leaves no other recourse against the repetition of barbarous outrages."

Both Rogers and Bennett write that "[s]tate practice in the Second World War was characterised by, among other factors, the doctrine of belligerent reprisal."

=== Post-1945 ===
After 1945, as a result of the general prohibition on use of force imposed by Article 2(4) of the United Nations Charter, armed reprisals in time of peace are no longer legal, but the possibility remains of non-armed reprisals (also known as countermeasures) as well as belligerent reprisals during hostilities when the law of international armed conflict (LOIAC) is violated.

In the case of belligerent reprisals, apart from the three factors in the Naulila case:

- a warning must also be issued beforehand;
- once the other party has stopped violation of LOIAC, belligerent reprisals must also be terminated;
- and the decision to engage in belligerent reprisals must be taken by a competent authority.

All four Geneva Conventions prohibit reprisals against, respectively, battlefield casualties, shipwreck survivors, prisoners of war, and protected persons (civilian or military), as well as certain buildings and property. The 1977 AP 1 defines what is an "indiscriminate attack".

One example of recurrent reprisals after the practice was prohibited by the united nation is the reprisal operations conducted by Israel against neighboring Egypt, Syria and Jordan throughout the 1950s and 1960s. These reprisals targeted both civilian and military targets, in retribution for similar infiltrations by units of the national armies of these countries as well as Palestinian fedayeen.

== See also ==
- Collective punishment
- Letter of marque (license to hunt enemy ships and retake lost ships from the enemy)
