= Battle of Mufilo =

1907 battle in Portuguese Angola

Coordinates: 16.8°S 14.9833°E

- Part of the Campaigns of Pacification and Occupation
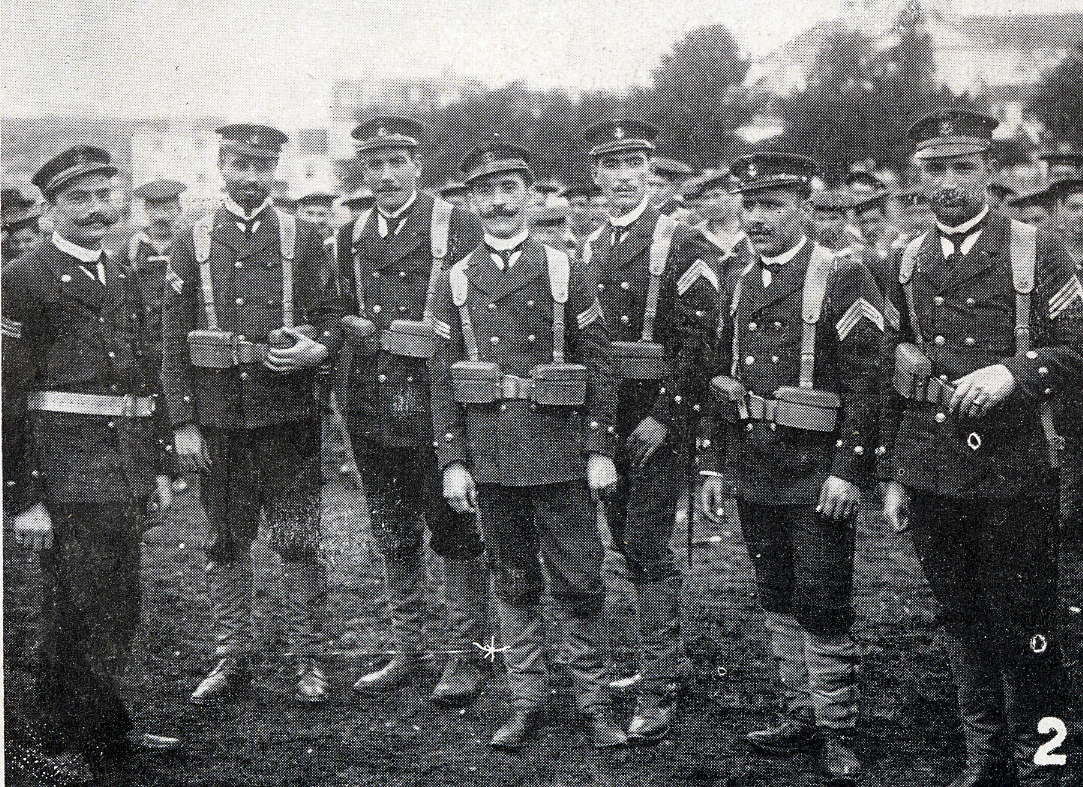
- Portuguese marine sergeants of the expeditionary force sent to fight the Cuamato (photo taken in Lisbon on 15 May 1907 by Joshua Benoliel)
Date	27 August 1907
Location	Southwest of Portuguese Angola
Result	Portuguese victory

Belligerents
Portuguese Empire	Ovambo

Commanders and leaders
Alves Roçadas	Sihetekela

Strength
2,300 men	20,000 men

Casualties and losses
15 killed 55 wounded	Unknown

The Battle of Mufilo (Portuguese: Combate de Mufilo) took place on 27 August 1907, in the southwest of Portuguese Angola, during the Ovambo resistance to Portuguese colonization.
