= Khorab Memorial =

Namibian monument

Coordinates: 19.605730°S 17.384187°E

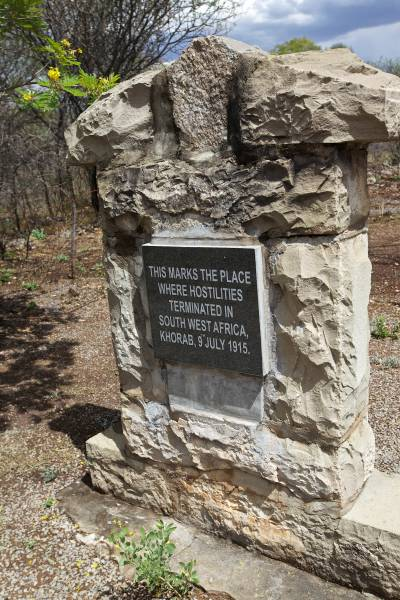
Khorab Memorial at Kilometre 500

Khorab, a farm oasis 2.6 km north of Otavi, Namibia, hosts a monument commemorating negotiations between South African and German troops fighting in World War I. These led to the surrender of around 4,000 German soldiers in what was known as the Treaty of Khorab. The monument was dedicated on September 28, 1973.

On the South African side, the treaty was signed by Louis Botha, commander of South African forces and Prime Minister, and five of his officers, including Botha's Chief of Staff, Col. J.J. Colyer. On the German side, the signatories included Dr. Theodor Seitz, Governor of German South West Africa (DSWA); Col. Victor Franke, commander of German forces in the DSWA; Lt. Col. Heinrich von Bethe, commander of the DSWA police; and five junior officers. Seitz was assisted in negotiating by Hans Graf von Schwerin-Löwitz.
