= Mucubal people =

Subgroup of Herero people in Angola

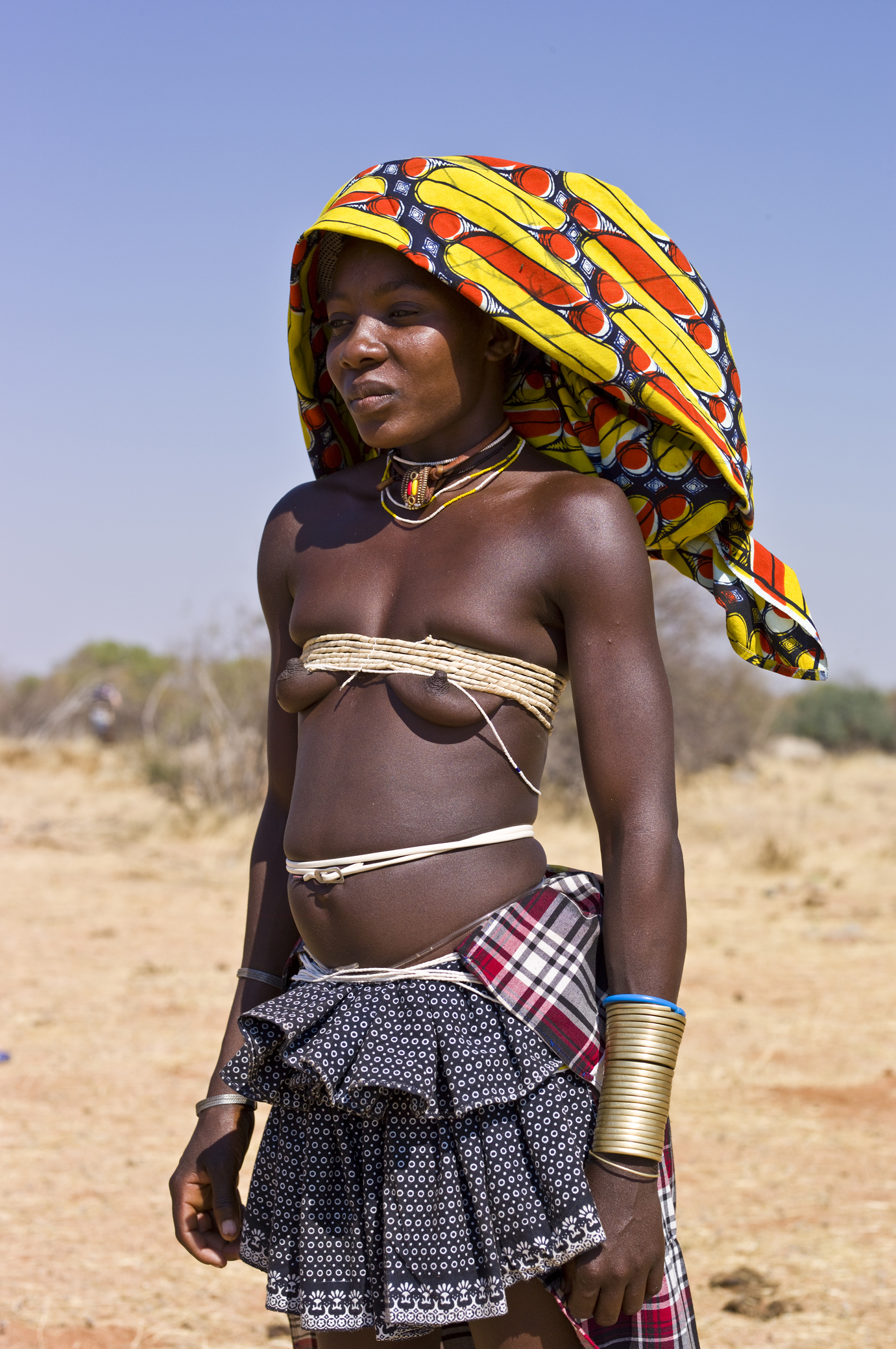
A Mucubal woman near Virei, Angola in 2011

The Mucubal people (also Mucubai, Mucabale or Mugubale) are a subgroup of the Herero people in southern Angola. Like the Masai, to whom they are said to be related, they are semi-nomadic, depending on cattle and agriculture. Their territory is in the Namib Desert, bounded by the Serra da Chela mountains to the north and Cunene River to the south.

Mucubal people typically wear little clothing, carry machetes or spears, and are renowned for their endurance, sometimes running 50 miles (80 km) in a day. Their villages typically consist of a group of huts arranged in a circle.

In the 1930s, the Portuguese estimated that there were around 5,000 Mucubal, occupying an area two-thirds the size of Portugal. Between 1939 and 1943, Portuguese army operations against the Mucubal, whom they accused of rebellion and cattle-thieving, resulted in hundreds of Mucubal being killed. During the campaign, 3,529 were taken prisoner, 20% of whom were women and children, and imprisoned in concentration camps. Many died in captivity from undernourishment, violence and forced labor. Around 600 were sent to Sao Tome and Principe. Hundreds were also sent to a camp in Damba, where 26% died. According to Rafael Coca de Campos, the operations against the Mucubal constituted genocide.
