= Naulila Incident =

- Part of German campaign in Angola
- Location of the Portuguese forts Cuangar and Naulila on the border with German Southwest Africa.
Date	19 October 1914
Location	Naulila, Portuguese Angola
Result	Portuguese victory

Belligerents
First Portuguese Republic; (Portuguese Angola) Portuguese West Africa	German Empire; German South West Africa

Commanders and leaders
(First Portuguese Republic) Manuel Álvares Sereno	(German South West Africa) Hans Schultze-Jena † (German South West Africa) Alexander Lösch † (German South West Africa) Kurt Röder † (German South West Africa) Carl Jensen (POW) (German South West Africa) Andreas † (German South West Africa) Hugo †

Strength
1 patrol Unknown number of men	6 men

Casualties and losses
None reported	5 killed 1 captured

The Naulila Incident was a violent confrontation between Portuguese forces and a German delegation on October 19, 1914, near Naulila in southern Portuguese Angola. This incident later led to the German attack on Naulila, on December 18.

== Background ==
On October 17, 1914, during the early stages of World War I, a small German delegation led by Dr. Hans Schultze-Jena crossed into Angola from German South West Africa without notifying Portuguese authorities. The delegation included two German officers, two native attendants, and a Danish interpreter. Their stated mission was to pursue a deserter, but they also sought to negotiate food supplies and the transport of German mail, which had been blocked by British forces. Portugal, although officially neutral, had declared martial law in southern Angola, restricting German movement and ordering the disarmament of any foreign troops entering its territory.

On October 18, the German delegation encountered a Portuguese patrol commanded by Lieutenant Manuel Álvares Sereno near Naulila. Despite initial tension, the two groups camped together overnight. The following morning, Schultze-Jena agreed to accompany the Portuguese patrol to Naulila to meet the local administrator but grew suspicious of Portuguese intentions.

== Incident ==
On October 19, at Naulila, the Germans discovered that the Portuguese administrator was absent. Schultze-Jena, believing he was being lured into a trap, attempted to return to his camp with his group, refusing Portuguese orders to disarm. Tensions escalated when Schultze-Jena reportedly aimed his carbine at Álvares Sereno, who was unarmed, while another German officer drew a pistol. Álvares Sereno ordered his men to open fire, resulting in the deaths of Schultze-Jena, two other German officers, and their two attendants. The interpreter, Carl Jensen, was captured and held by the Portuguese until November 1919.

== Aftermath ==
The incident caused outrage in German South West Africa, where it was viewed as a deliberate Portuguese ambush. German authorities and media condemned the killings, referring to the deceased as the "five murdered at Naulila” (German: der fünf Ermordeten von Naulila). The event grew tensions between Portugal and Germany, leading to a German retaliatory attack on Naulila on December 18, 1914, known as the Battle of Naulila.

A Portuguese inquiry into the incident concluded that Álvares Sereno acted in self defense. This assessment was later supported by the International Tribunal of Lausanne in 1928 when Portugal claimed damages from Germany for the retaliatory attack. The arbitrators ruled that Sereno's actions were justified given the perceived threat posed by the armed Germans. Portugal was awarded compensation.

== Bibliography ==
- Matias, Diogo (2010). "As operações militares de manutenção do Império Português em África: Uma visão sobre as tácticas usadas na perspectiva da doutrina actual" (PDF).
- Historicus Africanus", Der 1. Weltkrieg in Deutsch-Südwestafrika 1914/15", Volume 2 "Naulila", Glanz & Gloria Verlag, Windhoek 2017; ISBN 978-99916-872-3-0
