= Victor Franke =

German military officer of South West Africa

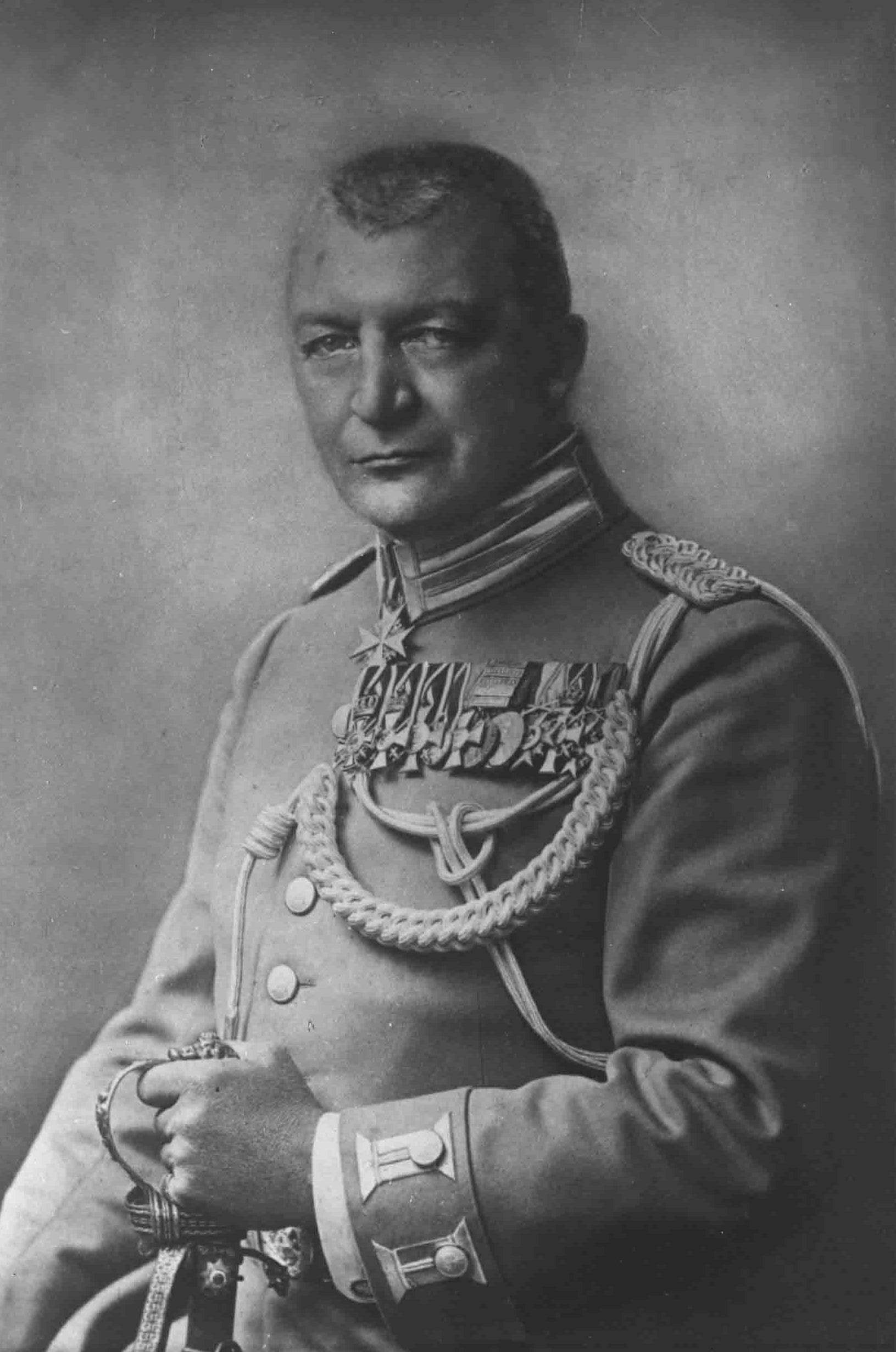
Victor Franke (1907)

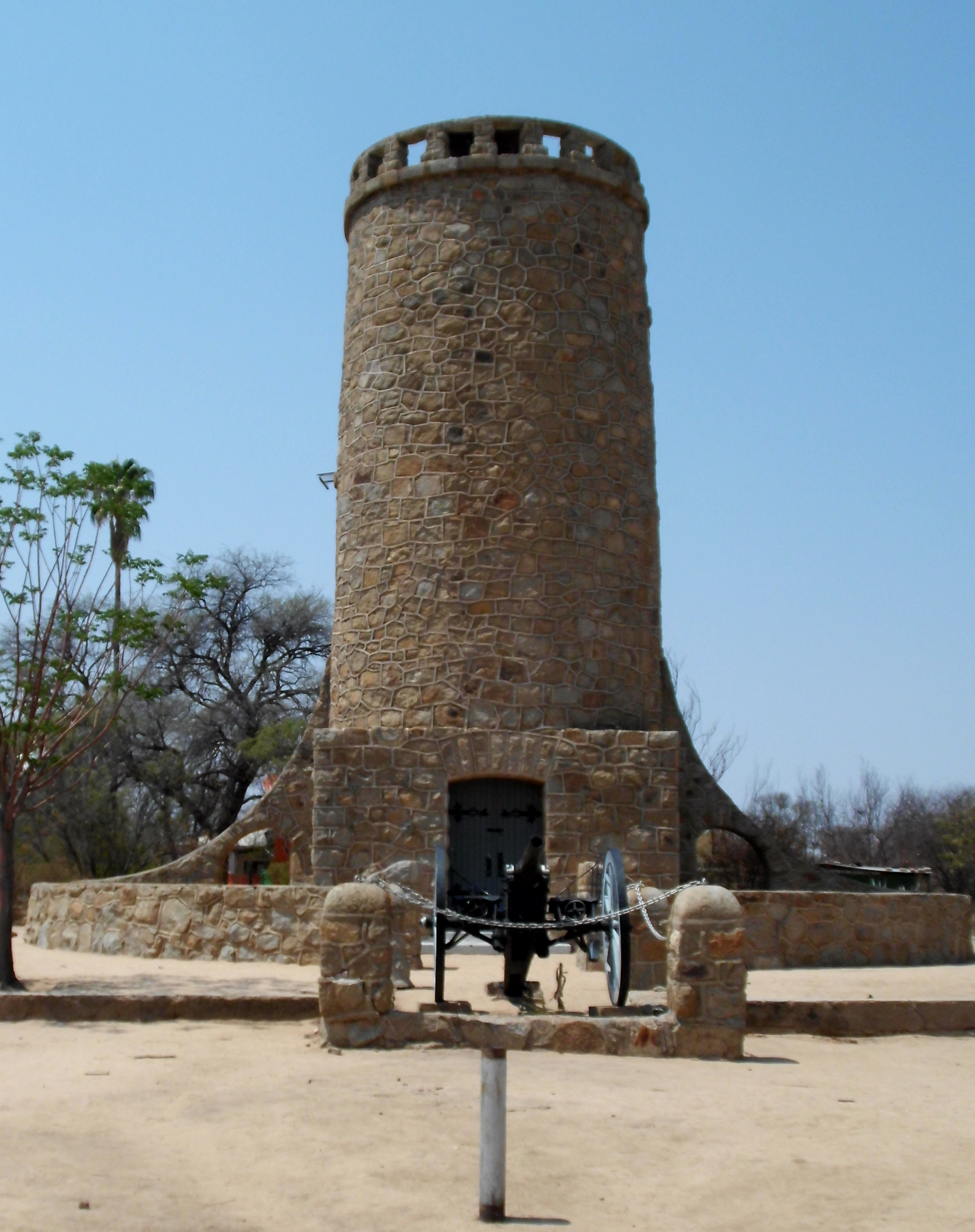
Franke Tower in Omaruru (2016)

Erich Victor Carl August Franke (21 July 1865 – 7 August 1936) was a German military officer and the last commander of the Schutztruppe in German South West Africa. Franke was born in Zuckmantel, Austrian Silesia. He was Bezirksamtmann (district officer) in several German South West Africa locations, especially Ovamboland and Kaokoveld. He was stationed at Outjo from 1899 until 1910. He was involved in several campaigns against native tribes who resisted German colonial rule. In the early phases of the Herero Genocide of 1904, he was dubbed "Hero of Omaruru", because of his victory over numerically superior Herero forces at Omaruru. He also had successful campaigns against the Herero at Okahandja and Windhoek.

At the beginning of World War I, he led a successful counter-attack against Portuguese forces at Naulila, Portuguese Angola (see German campaign in Angola). On 12 November 1914, he became commander of the Schutztruppe after the death of Joachim von Heydebreck. He and 2,166 men surrendered to South African forces near Khorab on 9 July 1915. Five weeks later, South African troops controlled the entire German colony.

In 1919, Franke left South West Africa, and in 1920 retired from the German Army as a Major-General.

Today, the "Franke Tower" in Omaruru stands as a monument to Franke's 1904 military exploits. Three kilometres outside the town of Otavi on the Tsumeb Road is a memorial marking the German surrender at Khorab. Also, in the town of Outjo is the "Franke House Museum".

He was reportedly a serial rapist of African women.
