= Naulila =

- commune and town
- Location in Angola
- Coordinates: 17°12′S 14°41′E
- Country: Angola
- Province: Cunene
- Municipality: Ombadja
- Time zone: UTC+1 (WAT)
- Climate: BSh

Naulila is a town and commune in the municipality of Ombadja, province of Cunene, Angola.

Located on the Cunene River which separates Angola and Namibia, Naulila was the scene of fighting between Portuguese Angola and German South West Africa during the early stages of World War I. On 19 October 1914, a German military column crossed the border and entered Angola without authorisation from the Portuguese authorities. The column was intercepted by Portuguese forces and conducted to Fort Naulila. At Naulila, a dispute occurred between the Portuguese and the Germans which resulted in the deaths of three German officers.

On 31 October, the Germans under the command of Oswald Ostermann retaliated, and raided the Portuguese fort at Cuangar with the use of machine guns, in which the fort was destroyed and the majority of the border guards killed. This was later referred to as the "Cuangar Massacre". On 18/19 December, Victor Franke led a successful retaliatory attack, defeating the Portuguese at Naulila.

== Legacy ==
Today, in the town of Outjo, Namibia, there is a monument and a cemetery commemorating German losses in the incidents at Naulila in 1914.
