= José Augusto Alves Roçadas =

Portuguese politician

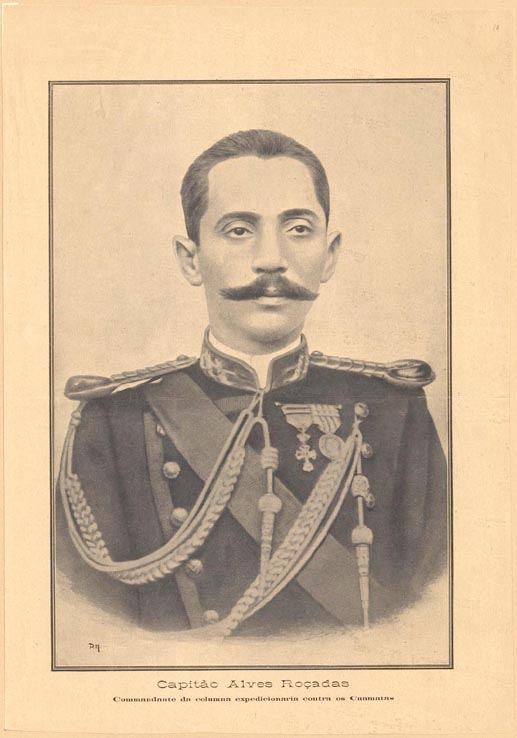

Governor of Macau
- In office 1908–1909
- Monarch: Manuel II of Portugal
- Preceded by: Pedro de Azevedo Coutinho
- Succeeded by: Eduardo Augusto Marques

Governor of Angola
- In office 1909–1910
- Monarch: Manuel II of Portugal
- Preceded by: Pedro de Azevedo Coutinho
- Succeeded by: Caetano Francisco Cláudio Eugénio Gonçalves

Personal details
- Born: 6 April 1865 Vila Real, Portugal
- Died: 28 April 1926 (aged 61) Lisbon, Portugal
- Awards: Officer of the Order of the Tower and Sword; Distinguished Service Medal; Military Merit Medal

Military service
- Branch/service: Army
- Years of service: 1882–1926
- Rank: General
- Battles/wars: Campaigns of Pacification and Occupation; Battle of Mufilo; World War I; German campaign in Angola

Chinese name
- Traditional Chinese: 羅沙達
- Simplified Chinese: 罗沙达
Transcriptions
Standard Mandarin
- Hanyu Pinyin: Luó Shādá
Yue: Cantonese
- Jyutping: lo4 saa1 daat6

José Augusto Alves Roçadas (6 April 1865 – 28 April 1926) was a career officer of the Portuguese Army and a appointed as a colonial administrator in Portuguese Angola and Macau.

In 1907 troops under his command in Portuguese Angola put down a revolt by the Ovambo at the Battle of Mufilo.

As a colonial administrator, Alves Roçadas served as Governor of the District of Huíla in Portuguese Angola (1905–1908), Governor of Macau (1908–1909), and Governor-General of Angola (1909–1910).

During World War I, Alves Roçadas served as the commanding officer of Portuguese forces in southern Angola. He led them in combat against the German invasion of Portuguese Africa. Both sides used both regular military forces, such as the German forces, and regional auxiliaries or armed groups made up of indigenous and other peoples.

After the war, Roçadas participated in the preparation of the 28 May 1926 coup d'état, together with generals Manuel Gomes da Costa, Sinel de Cordes and Óscar Carmona. They created the Ditadura Nacional. Although originally marked to take up a post in the new government, he fell ill and died a month before the coup took place.
