= Portuguese Angola =

1575–1975 Portuguese possession in West Africa

Coordinates: 12°30′S 18°30′E

Province of Angola Província de Angola
- 1575–1975
- Flag (1910–1975) Coat of arms (1951–1975)
- Anthem: "Hymno Patriótico" (1808–34); Patriotic Anthem "Hino da Carta" (1834–1910); Hymn of the Charter "A Portuguesa" (1910–75); The Portuguese
- Portuguese Angola in 1951–1975
- Status: Colony of the Portuguese Empire (1575–1951); Overseas province of Portugal (1951–1972); State of the Portuguese Empire (1972–1975)
- Capital: Luanda
- Common languages: Portuguese (official); Umbundu, Kimbundu, Kikongo, Chokwe
- Religion: Roman Catholicism; Protestantism; Traditional religions
- Head of State
  - 1575–78: King Sebastian I of Portugal
  - 1974–75: President Francisco da Costa Gomes
- Governor General
  - 1575–1589: Paulo Dias de Novais
  - 1975: Leonel Alexandre Gomes Cardoso
- Historical era: Imperialism
  - Establishment of Luanda: 1575
  - Independence of Angola: 11 November 1975

Population
  - 1975 estimate: 7,033,000
  - Density: 5.64/km^{2} (14.6/sq mi)
- Currency: Portuguese real (1575–1911); Portuguese escudo (1911–14); Angolan escudo (1914–28; 1958–77); Angolan angolar (1926–58)
- ISO 3166 code: AO
Preceded by
Kingdom of Kongo
Kingdom of Ndongo
Mbunda Kingdom
Lunda Empire
Succeeded by
People's Republic of Angola
Democratic People's Republic of Angola
Republic of Cabinda
- Today part of: Angola

Portuguese Angola (Portuguese: Angola Portuguesa) was a historical colony of the Portuguese Empire (1575–1951), the overseas province Portuguese West Africa (Note: Officially the State of West Africa and Overseas Province of Angola) of Estado Novo Portugal (1951–1972), and the State of Angola of the Portuguese Empire (1972–1975). The People's Republic of Angola became independent in 1975 until 1992, when the country officially changed to the Republic of Angola as a multi-party democratic republic. Brazil was the first country to recognize Angola's independence.

In the 16th and 17th century, Portugal ruled along the coast and engaged in military conflicts with the Kingdom of Kongo, but in the 18th century, Portugal colonial control began to gradually spread into the interior highlands. Other polities in the region included the Kingdom of Ndongo, Kingdom of Lunda, and Mbunda Kingdom. Full control of the entire territory that now forms Angola was not achieved until the beginning of the 20th century, when agreements with other European powers during the Scramble for Africa fixed the colony's interior borders, especially the Belgian Congo (now the Democratic Republic of the Congo) as Belgium's private colony.

== History ==
The history of Portuguese presence on the territory of contemporary Angola lasted from the arrival of the explorer Diogo Cão in 1484 until the decolonization of the territory in November 1975. Over these five centuries, several different situations existed.

=== Colony, 1575–1951 ===
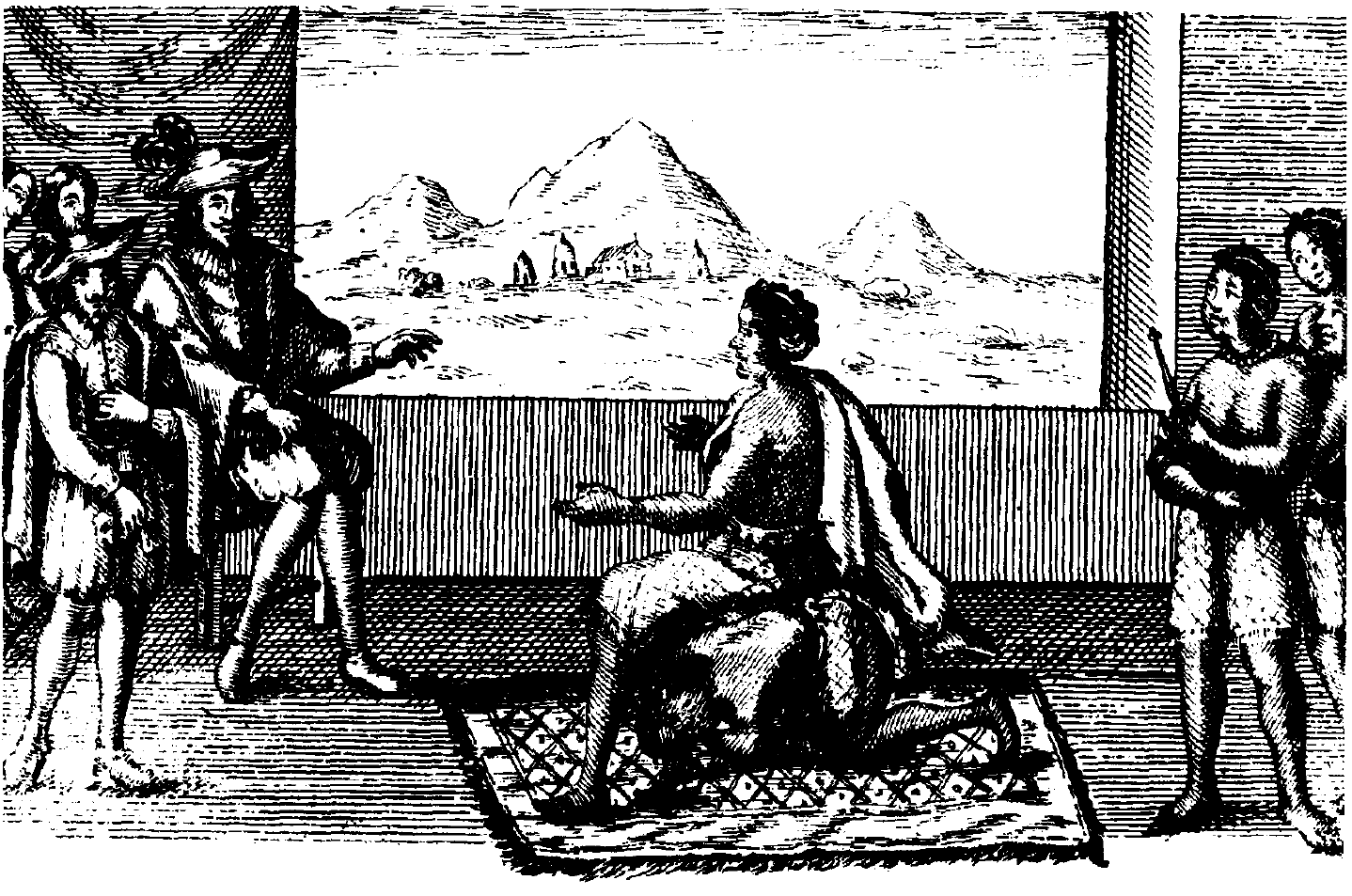
Queen Nzinga in peace negotiations with the Portuguese governor in Luanda in 1657

When in 1484, Diogo Cão and other explorers reached the Kongo Kingdom at the end of the 15th century, its present territory comprised a number of separate peoples, some organized as kingdoms or tribal federations of varying sizes. The Portuguese were interested in trade, principally in slave trade. They therefore maintained a peaceful and mutually profitable relationship with the rulers and nobles of the Kongo Kingdom. Kings such as João I and Afonso I studied Christianity and learned Portuguese, in turn Christianising their nation and sharing the benefits from the slave trade. The Portuguese established small trading posts on the lower Congo, in the area of the present Democratic Republic. A more important trading settlement on the Atlantic coast was erected at Soyo in the territory of the Kongo Kingdom. It is now Angola's northernmost town, apart from the Cabinda exclave.

In 1575, the Portuguese established the settlement of Luanda on the coast south of the Kongo Kingdom. In the 17th century came the settlement of Benguela even farther to the south. Between 1580 and the 1820s, well over a million people from present-day Angola were exported as slaves to the New World, mainly to Brazil, but also to North America. According to Oliver and Atmore, "for 200 years, the colony of Angola developed essentially as a gigantic slave-trading enterprise". Angola was very closely linked both economically and socially to Brazil via the notorious "middle passage" of the trans-Atlantic slave trade.

A mestiço (mixed race people) elite emerged in Luanda by the early 17th century whose principle source of wealth was facilitating the purchase of Africans from the interior of what is now modern Angola and the Democratic Republic of the Congo to export as slaves to Brazil. The majority of those enslaved were taken captive by their fellow Africans usually in wars and/or raids and sold to the merchants of Luanda. Portuguese sailors, explorers, soldiers and merchants had a long-standing policy of conquest and establishment of military and trading outposts in Africa with the conquest of Muslim-ruled Ceuta in 1415 and the establishment of bases in present-day Morocco and the Gulf of Guinea. The Portuguese had Catholic beliefs and their military expeditions included from the very beginning the conversion of foreign peoples.

In the 17th century, conflicting economic interests led to a military confrontation with the Kongo Kingdom. Portugal defeated the Kongo Kingdom in the Battle of Mbwila on 29 October, 1665, but suffered a disastrous defeat at the Battle of Kitombo when they tried to invade Kongo in 1670. They annexed what remained of the kingdom of Ndongo after the Battle of Pungo Andongo. Control of most of the central highlands was achieved in the 18th century.

Further attempts at conquering the interior were undertaken in the 19th century starting in 1838, as part of the Campaigns of Pacification and Occupation. Viye was annexed in 1890. However, full Portuguese administrative control of the entire territory was not achieved until the beginning of the 20th century.

Due to the colony stretching into the interior, there was substantial admixture between Africans and Portuguese settlers, creating Afro-Portuguese communities called "Ambaquista" (or "Mbakista"), named after the town of Mbaka founded in 1618. The abolition of the trans-Atlantic slave trade in the 19th century badly damaged Angola's economy. The mestiço elite who had grown wealthy on the slave trade saw a serious fall in their social status as their principle source of income no longer existed. It was only in the 19th century with the "Scramble for Africa" that the Portuguese began to push seriously into regions in the interior of Angola that they had ignored until then, largely out of the fear that other European powers might annex the interior before Portugal did.

In 1884, the United Kingdom, which up to that time refused to acknowledge that Portugal possessed territorial rights north of Ambriz, concluded a treaty recognising Portuguese sovereignty over both banks of the lower Congo. However, the treaty, meeting with opposition there and in Germany, was not ratified. Agreements concluded with the Congo Free State, the German Empire and France in 1885–1886 fixed the limits of the province, except in the south-east, where the frontier between Barotseland (north-west Rhodesia) and Angola was determined by the Anglo-Portuguese Treaty of 1891 and the arbitration award of King Victor Emmanuel III of Italy in 1905.

During the period of Portuguese colonial rule of Angola, cities, towns and trading posts were founded, railways were opened (notably the Benguela Railway), ports were built, and a Westernised society was being gradually developed. The Portuguese pointed to the Ambaquista to justify their colonial claims in line with their "civilising mission". In 1908 the "native tax" was introduced to coerce Angolans into the capitalist money economy and raise government revenue. Various forms of forced labour were employed, the most severe seeing Africans shipped to Sao Tome or Principe to work on plantations which few returned from. Local administrators forced people to work on constructing railways and buildings. As late as 1954, it is estimated over 300,000 Angolans worked under forced labour. It was not abolished until 1962.

With the outbreak of the First World War in 1914, the Germans, who controlled South West Africa, clashed with the Portuguese in Angola numerous times. The Naulila Incident in October 1914, saw German officers who had crossed into Angola killed by Portuguese forces. The Germans returned in December and captured Naulila, forcing the Portuguese to withdraw from the Humbe region. Several tribes subsequently launched revolts against Portuguese rule, including the German-backed Ovambo Uprising led by King Mandume ya Ndemufayo of Oukwanyama. The area was pillaged and looted and tribes that had not joined the rebellion were massacred. The revolting tribes started to fight each and a famine broke out due to a massive drought. In March 1915, Portuguese forces led by General António Júlio da Costa Pereira de Eça launched a campaign to reoccupy the territory and assert control over previously unconquered territory. The Portuguese forces numbered around 10,000 and included Damara, Herero, and Afrikaner irregulars. By the time the Portuguese forces reached the area, the Ovambo's military power had already been reduced due to the famine and social upheaval. Portuguese forces terrorized the local population, massacring them and burning down their villages. They also aggravated the ongoing famine by requisitioning food, taxation and forced conscription. A 2026 study described the Portuguese campaign against the Ovambo as genocide. During the war, the population of southern Angola fell by at least one quarter, mostly due to immigration to South West Africa.

In the 1930s, the Portuguese estimated that there were around 5,000 Mucubal, occupying an area two-thirds the size of Portugal. Between 1939 and 1943, Portuguese army operations against the Mucubal, who they accused of rebellion and cattle-thieving, resulted in hundreds of Mucubal killed. During the campaign, 3,529 were taken prisoner, 20% of whom were women and children, and imprisoned in concentration camps. Many died in captivity from undernourishment, violence and forced labor. Around 600 were sent to Sao Tome and Principe. Hundreds were also sent to a camp in Damba, where 26% died.

Prior to the 1950s, the number of Portuguese settlers in Angola was relatively small with the 1950 census listing only 80,000 people living in Angola as white. The policy of the Portuguese government was to discourage Portuguese settlers in Angola least Angola become a "new Brazil" that would demand independence just as the Portuguese colony of Brazil had won its independence in the 19th century. However, after the degree upgrading Angola from being a colony to being an overseas province of Portugal in 1951, the Estado Novo regime started to encourage a massive number of Portuguese settlers to move to Angola in order to prove that Angola was really an overseas province. By 1973, there were 324,000 Portuguese settlers living in Angola who dominated the economic life of the colony, owning almost all of the businesses as well as dominating all of the professions. The number of Portuguese settlers were 9,000 in 1900, 12,000 in 1910, 20,700 in 1920, 30,000 in 1930, 40,000 in 1940, 80,000 in 1950, 172,000 in 1960 and 290,000 in 1970. By 1974, of the six million people living in Angola, 5% (335,000) were settlers, giving Angola the second largest white population in Africa after South Africa. The white settler population in Angola outnumbered those of Rhodesia (modern Zimbabwe) which had a white population of 275,000, Portuguese East Africa (modern Mozambique), which a white population of 180,000 and Kenya, which had a white population of 50,000.

The arrival of the settlers started an economic boom, but at the same time, it sparked massive resentment from the indigenous African population who were greatly angered at the way that Estado Novo regime blatantly favored the interests of the settlers over their interests. The fact that the Estado Novo provided for schools for the children of the settlers while providing almost no educational opportunities for the African population outraged the black Angolans who complained about being treated as second-class citizens in their own land. Most of the settlers lived in urban areas and were relatively unaffected by the war for independence until the early 1970s, which explained why the war did not halt the movements of settlers into Angola in the 1960s, who continued to pour into Angola. The Portuguese settlers in Angola came from the poorer classes and most could not afford to return to Portugal even if they wanted to. Most of the settlers in urban areas tended to work menial positions such as street sweepers, taxi drivers, waiters, market women, and so forth. The poverty of most of the Portuguese settlers led for them to press to have certain menial occupations such as working as taxi drivers reserved for them, which caused much resentment from the mestiços and even more so the Africans who found themselves excluded from these occupations. However, the settlers also dominated the business life of Angola and owned almost all of the coffee plantations as well as providing most of the lower and middle-ranking civil servants.

The general attitude of the settlers was that Angola was "a white man's country" and that they had come to found "a second Brazil" or a "New Lusitania". The society that existed in Angola in the 1950s was described as one characterised by "extreme racism" with a rigid social hierarchy with the whites on the top; the mestiços (mixed race people) below the whites; the assimilados (those Africans who had embraced the Portuguese language and culture) below the whites and the mestiços; and finally the unassimilated African population at the bottom. There was some tension between the Estado Novo regime, which saw Angola as an overseas province vs. the settlers who expected that Angola would eventually evolve into "a second Brazil", namely become an independent nation under their leadership.

==== Overseas province, 1951–1971 beginning of the colonial war ====
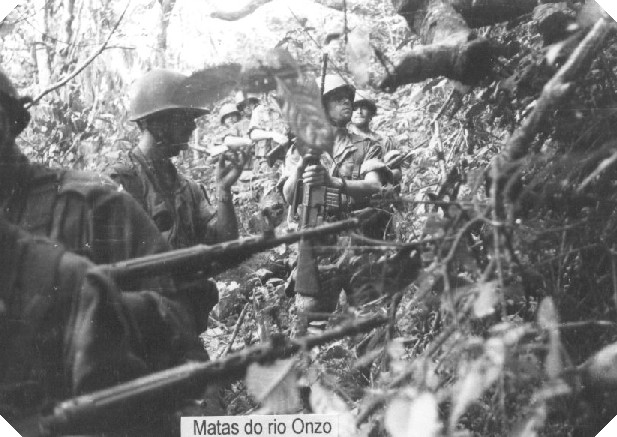
Portuguese troops during the Colonial War

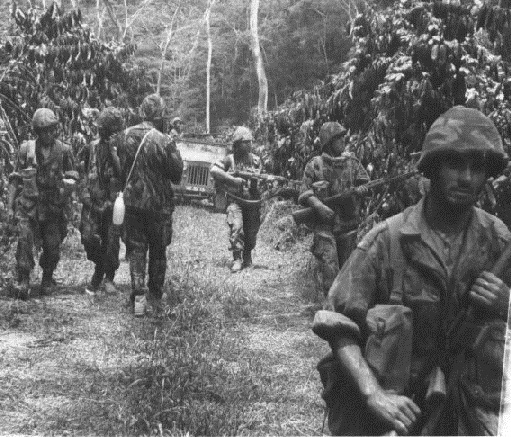
Portuguese soldiers in Angola

In 1951, the Portuguese Colony of Angola became an overseas province of Portugal. In the late 1950s the National Front for the Liberation of Angola (FNLA) and the People's Movement for the Liberation of Angola (MPLA) began to organize strategies and action plans to fight Portuguese rule and the remunerated system which affected many of the native African people from the countryside, who were relocated from their homes and made to perform compulsory work, almost always unskilled hard labour, in an environment of economic boom.

Organised guerrilla warfare began in 1961, the same year that a law was passed to improve the working conditions of the largely unskilled native workforce, which was demanding more rights. In 1961, the Portuguese government indeed abolished a number of basic legal provisions which discriminated against black people, like the Estatuto do Indigenato (Decree-Law 43: 893 of 6 September 1961). However, the conflict, conversely known as the Colonial War or the War of Liberation, erupted in the north of the territory when UPA rebels based in Republic of the Congo massacred both white and black civilians in surprise attacks in the countryside. After visiting the United Nations, rebel leader Holden Roberto returned to Kinshasa and organised Bakongo militants.

Holden Roberto launched an incursion into Angola on 15 March 1961, leading 4,000 to 5,000 militants. His forces took farms, government outposts, and trading centres, killing everyone they encountered. At least 1,000 whites and an unknown number of blacks were killed. Commenting on the incursion, Roberto said, "this time the slaves did not cower". They massacred everything. The effective military in Angola were composed of approximately 6,500 men: 5,000 black Africans and 1,500 white Europeans sent from Portugal. After these events the Portuguese government, under the dictatorial Estado Novo regime of António de Oliveira Salazar and later Marcelo Caetano, sent thousands of troops from Europe to perform counterterrorism and counterinsurgency operations.

In 1962 Holden Roberto established the Revolutionary Government of Angola in Exile (Portuguese: Governo revolucionário de Angola no exílio, GRAE) in Kinshasa in an attempt to claim on the international scene the sole representation of forces fighting Portuguese rule in Angola. In 1966, the National Union for the Total Independence of Angola (UNITA) also started pro-independence guerrilla operations. The guerrilla movement in Angola was greatly hindered by ethnic and ideological divisions along with personality clashes between the leaders of the guerrilla. The Communist MPLA was led by mestiço intellectuals and drew most of its support from the Mbundu people and mestiços. The MPLA also tended to drew support very strongly from intellectuals and residents of Luanda. The FLNA led by Roberto drew most of its support from the Bakongo people and Roberto's efforts to widen support beyond the Bakongo were unsuccessful. Roberto was a man who had a talent for making people dislike him, which hindered his efforts to present himself as the preeminent Angolan guerrilla leader despite the fact that it was he who launched the war for independence in 1961. The fact that the FLNA engaged in brutal tactics such as press-ganging Mbundu peasants into serving as guerrillas along with its massacres of mestiços and Ovimbundu gave the FLNA a thuggish reputation. Roberto had a poor understanding of guerrilla warfare and the FLNA was consistently the least effective of the three guerilla movements. Jonas Savimbi, who had served as the GRAE's foreign minister, broke away in 1966 to found UNITA after having a personality clash with Roberto. Savimbi was an Ovimbundu (the largest ethnic group in Angola) and UNITA drew almost all of its support from the Ovimbundu people.

The MPLA waged a classic "people's war" of the type advocated by Mao Zedong, and presented the guerrilla struggle as not just a war for independence, but also as a social revolution that would achieve a Marxist society. In rural areas, the MPLA waged a campaign of assassination against village chiefs who usually collaborated with the Portuguese colonial authorities. The urban mestiço intellectuals who dominated the MPLA had some difficulty in appealing to African peasantry. The MPLA succeeded in winning some support from the Mbundu people, but was unsuccessful in appealing to support from the Bakongo and Ovimbundu. The guerrillas largely operated in the rural areas of Angola in part because the Portuguese presence in urban areas was too strong and in part because it was difficult to appeal to win support from urban African workers. Despite the overall military superiority of the Portuguese Army in the Angolan theatre, the independence guerrilla movements were never fully defeated.

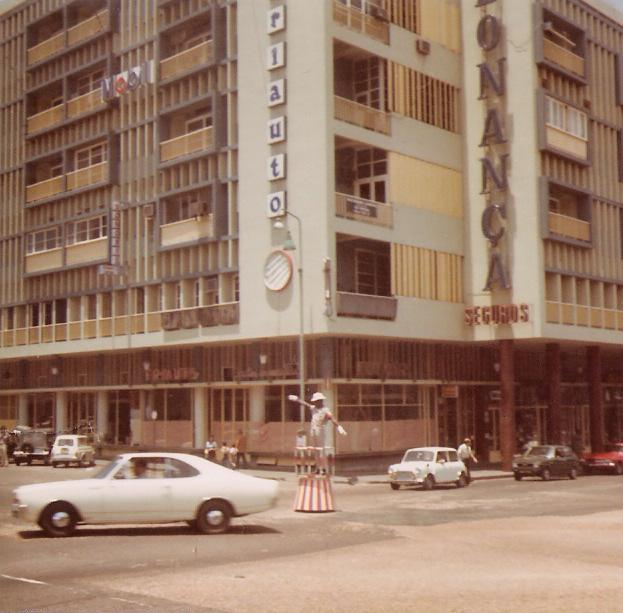
Luanda in Portuguese Angola in 1972

From 1966 to 1970, the pro-independence guerrilla movement MPLA expanded their previously limited insurgency operations to the East of Angola. This vast countryside area was far away from the main urban centres and close to foreign countries where the guerrillas were able to take shelter. The UNITA, a smaller pro-independence guerrilla organisation established in the East, supported the MPLA. Until 1970, the combined guerrilla forces of MPLA and UNITA in the East Front were successful in pressuring Portuguese Armed Forces (FAP) in the area to the point that the guerrillas were able to cross the Cuanza River and could threaten the territory of Bié, which included an important urban centre in the agricultural, commercial and industrial town of Silva Porto. In 1970, the guerrilla movement decided to reinforce the Eastern Front by relocating troops and armament from the North to the East.

==== Campaign in the Eastern Front, 1971 ====
In 1971, the Portuguese Armed Forces started a successful counter-insurgency military campaign that expelled the three guerrilla movements operating in the East to beyond the frontiers of Angola, the Frente Leste. The last guerrillas lost hundreds of soldiers and left tons of equipment behind, disbanding chaotically to neighbouring countries or, in some cases, joining or surrendering to the Portuguese. In order to gain the confidence of the local rural populations, and to create conditions for their permanent and productive settlement in the region, the Portuguese authorities organised massive vaccination campaigns, medical check-ups, and water, sanitation and alimentary infrastructure as a way to better contribute to the economic and social development of the people and dissociate the population from the guerrillas and their influence. On 31 December 1972, the Development Plan of the East (Plano de Desenvolvimento do Leste) included in its first stage 466 development enterprises (150 were completed and 316 were being built). Nineteen health centres had been built and 26 were being constructed. 51 new schools were operating and 82 were being constructed By 1972, after the Frente Leste, complemented by a pragmatic hearts and minds policy, the military conflict in Angola was effectively won for the Portuguese.

=== Federated state status, 1972 ===
In June 1972, the Portuguese National Assembly approved a new version of its Organic Law on Overseas Territories, in order to grant its African overseas territories a wider political autonomy and to tone down the increasing dissent both internally and abroad. It changed Angola's status from an overseas province to an autonomous state with authority over some internal affairs, while Portugal was to retain responsibility for defense and foreign relations. However, the intent was by no means to grant Angolan independence, but was instead to "win the hearts and minds" of the Angolans, convincing them to remain permanently a part of an intercontinental Portugal. Renaming Angola (like Mozambique) in November 1972 (in effect 1 January 1973) "Estado" (state) was part of an apparent effort to give the Portuguese Empire a sort of federal structure, conferring some degree of autonomy to the "states". In fact, the structural changes and increase in autonomy were extremely limited. The government of the "State of Angola" was the same as the old provincial government, except for some cosmetic changes to personnel and titles. As in Portugal itself, the government of the "State of Angola" was entirely composed of people aligned with the Estado Novo regime's establishment. While these changes were taking place, a few guerrilla nuclei stayed active inside the territory, and continued to campaign outside of Angola against Portuguese rule. The idea of having the independence movements take part in the political structure of the revamped territory's organization was absolutely unthinkable (on both sides).

=== Carnation Revolution, 1974 and independence, 1975 ===
However, the Portuguese authorities were unable to defeat the guerrillas as a whole during the Portuguese Colonial War, particularly in Portuguese Guinea, and suffered heavy casualties in the 13 years of conflict. Throughout the colonial war Portugal faced increasing dissent, arms embargoes and other punitive sanctions from most of the international community. The war was becoming even more unpopular in Portuguese society due to its length and costs, the worsening of diplomatic relations with other United Nations members, and the role it played as a factor in the perpetuation of the Estado Novo regime. It was this escalation that would lead directly to the mutiny of members of the Portuguese armed forces in the Carnation Revolution of April 1974 – an event that would lead to the independence of all of the former Portuguese colonies in Africa.

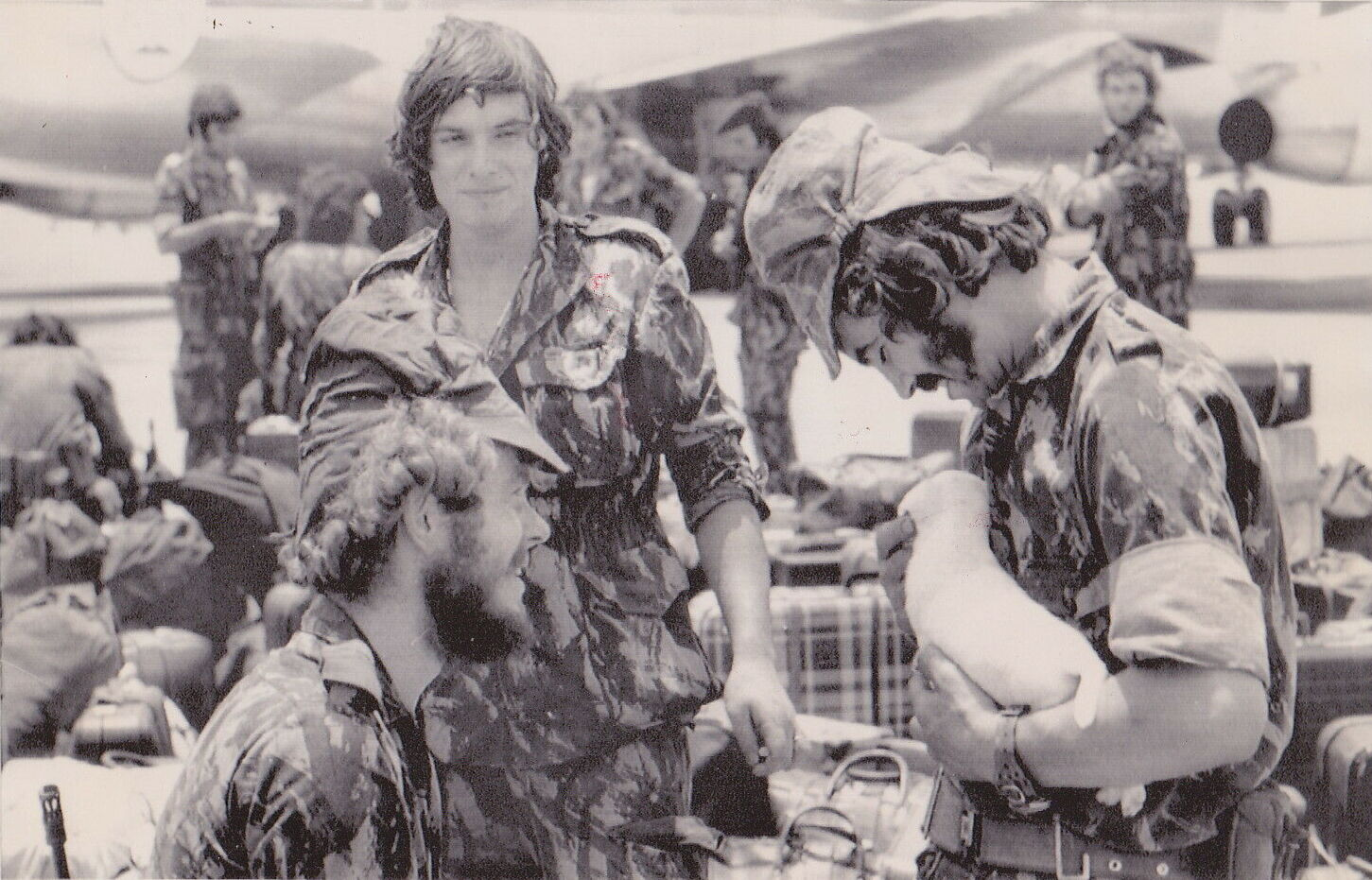
Portuguese soldiers withdrawing from the Nova Lisboa garrison in Angola in 1975

On 25 April 1974, the Portuguese Government of the Estado Novo regime under Marcelo Caetano, the corporatist and authoritarian regime established by António de Oliveira Salazar that had ruled Portugal since the 1930s, was overthrown in the Carnation Revolution, a military uprising in Lisbon. In May of that year, the Junta de Salvação Nacional (the new revolutionary government of Portugal) proclaimed a truce with the pro-independence African guerrillas in an effort to promote peace talks and independence. The military-led coup returned democracy to Portugal, ending the unpopular Colonial War where hundreds of thousands of Portuguese soldiers had been conscripted into military service, and replacing the authoritarian Estado Novo (New State) regime and its secret police which repressed elemental civil liberties and political freedoms. It started as a professional class protest of Portuguese Armed Forces captains against the 1973 decree law Dec. Lei n.^{o} 353/73.

These events prompted a mass exodus of Portuguese citizens, overwhelmingly white but some mestiço (mixed race) or black, from Portugal's African territories, creating hundreds of thousands destitute refugees — the retornados. On 11 November 1975, Angola became a sovereign state in accordance with the Alvor Agreement and the newly independent country was proclaimed the People's Republic of Angola for over 17 years until its constitution in 1992, when the country was renamed the "Republic of Angola".

== Government ==
A proposed flag for Portuguese Angola in 1932

Angola was governed in a highly militaristic style. One Portuguese author, E. Silva Correia in his 1782 book, Histdria de Angola wrote: "In no part of the Portuguese world is militia [an army] more necessary than in Angola." In 1867, the governor of Angola, Calheiros e Menezes wrote in his book Relatdrio do Governador Geral da Provincia de Angola, 1867 wrote "the normal condition of the administration of this colony is to make war, and to prepare itself for war." Most notably, every single Captain-General (renamed as Governor-General in 1836) was a serving army or naval officer. Generally, the Portuguese Army had about 2,000 European soldiers in Angola at any given moment from the 16th century into the 20th century. The Portuguese forces were backed up by the so-called guerra preta ("black war") of African troops who numbered between 5,000 to 20,000. The guerra preta were raised by loyal African sobas (chiefs) and were sometimes provided with uniforms and salaries.

Service in Angola was unpopular in the Portuguese Army and it was rare for a first-rate officer to be stationed in Angola. It was only during the final campaigns of conquest between 1890 and 1920 that the officers considered to be first-rate were stationed in Angola on a regular basis, and before then Angola was widely considered to be the place where the second-rate officers unfit for promotion were sent to. Most of the Portuguese troops in Angola were degredados (criminals sent to Angola to ease the problems of prison overcrowding), deserters who likewise been sent to Angola as a punishment, and various adventurers. The rate of pay for service in Angola was the same as in Portugal, which did not inspire many to volunteer for Angola. Service in Angola was deeply unpopular as the costs of living was twice that in Portugal; the death rate from diseases was very high; many of the soldiers felt isolated out in the bush; and there were frequent complaints that the Africans did not welcome the Portuguese.

In the 20th century, Portuguese Angola was subject to the Estado Novo regime. In 1951, the Portuguese authorities changed the statute of the territory from a colony to an overseas province of Portugal. Legally, the territory was as much a part of Portugal as Lisbon but as an overseas province enjoyed special derogations to account for its distance from Europe. Most members of the government of Angola were from Portugal, but a few were Angolan. Nearly all members of the bureaucracy were from Portugal, as most Angolans did not have the necessary qualifications to obtain positions.

A proposed flag for Portuguese Angola in 1965

The government of Angola, as it was in Portugal, was highly centralised. Power was concentrated in the executive branch, and all elections where they occurred were carried out using indirect methods. From the Prime Minister's office in Lisbon, authority extended down to the most remote posts of Angola through a rigid chain of command. The authority of the government of Angola was residual, primarily limited to implementing policies already decided in Europe. In 1967, Angola also sent a number of delegates to the National Assembly in Lisbon.

The highest official in the province was the governor-general, appointed by the Portuguese cabinet on recommendation of the Overseas Minister. The governor-general had both executive and legislative authority. A Government Council advised the governor-general in the running of the province. The functional cabinet consisted of five secretaries appointed by the Overseas Minister on the advice of the governor. A Legislative Council had limited powers and its main activity was approving the provincial budget. Finally, an Economic and Social Council had to be consulted on all draft legislation, and the governor-general had to justify his decision to Lisbon if he ignored its advice.

In 1972, the Portuguese National Assembly changed Angola's status from an overseas province to an autonomous state with authority over some internal affairs; Portugal was to retain responsibility for defense and foreign relations. In 1973, elections were held in Angola for a legislative assembly.

== Geography ==
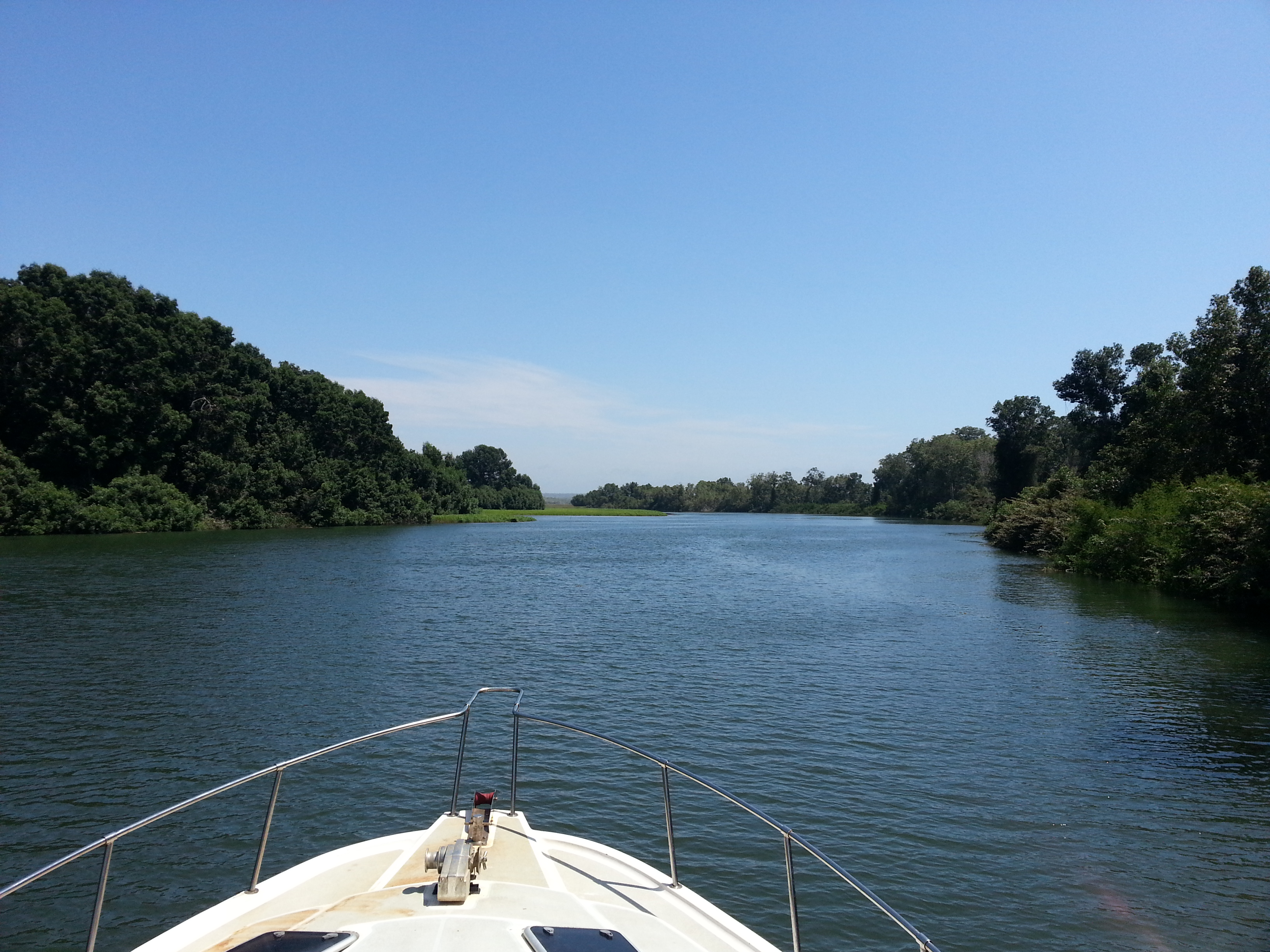
Cuanza River, which empties into the Atlantic Ocean near Luanda

Portuguese Angola was a territory covering 1,246,700 km^{2}, an area greater than France and Spain put together. It had 5,198 km of terrestrial borders and a coastline with 1,600 km. Its geography was diverse. From the coastal plain, ranging in width from 25 kilometres in the south to 100–200 kilometers in the north, the land rises in stages towards the high inland plateau covering almost two-thirds of the country, with an average altitude of between 1,200 and 1,600 metres. Angola's two highest peaks were located in these central highlands. They were Moco Mountain (2,620 m) and Meco Mountain (2,538 m).

Most of Angola's rivers rose in the central mountains. Of the many rivers that drain to the Atlantic Ocean, the Cuanza and Cunene were the most important. Other major streams included the Kwango River, which drains north to the Congo River system, and the Kwando and Cubango Rivers, both of which drain generally southeast to the Okavango Delta. As the land drops from the plateau, many rapids and waterfalls plunge downward in the rivers. Portuguese Angola had no sizable lakes, besides those formed by dams and reservoirs built by the Portuguese administration.

The Portuguese authorities established several national parks and natural reserves across the territory: Bicauri, Cameia, Cangandala, Iona, Mupa, Namibe and Quiçama. Iona was Angola's oldest and largest national park, it was proclaimed as a reserve in 1937 and upgraded to a national park in 1964.

Angola was a territory that underwent a great deal of progress after 1950. The Portuguese government built dams, roads, schools, etc. There was also an economic boom that led to a huge increase of the European population. The white population increased from 44,083 in 1940 to 172,529 in 1960. With around 1,000 immigrants arriving each month. On the eve of the end of the colonial period, the ethnic European residents numbered 400,000 (1974) (excluding enlisted and commissioned soldiers from the mainland) and the mixed race population was at around 100,000 (many were Cape Verdian migrants working in the territory). The total population was around 5.9 million at that time.

Luanda grew from a town of 61,208 with 14.6% of those inhabitants being white in 1940, to a major cosmopolitan city of 475,328 in 1970 with 124,814 Europeans (26.3%) and around 50,000 mixed race inhabitants. Most of the other large cities in Angola had around the same ratio of Europeans at the time, with the exception of Sá da Bandeira (Lubango), Moçâmedes (Namibe) and Porto Alexandre (Tombua) in the south where the white population was more established. All of these cities had European majorities from 50% to 60%.

=== Cities ===
The capital of the territory was Luanda, officially called São Paulo de Luanda. Other cities and towns were:

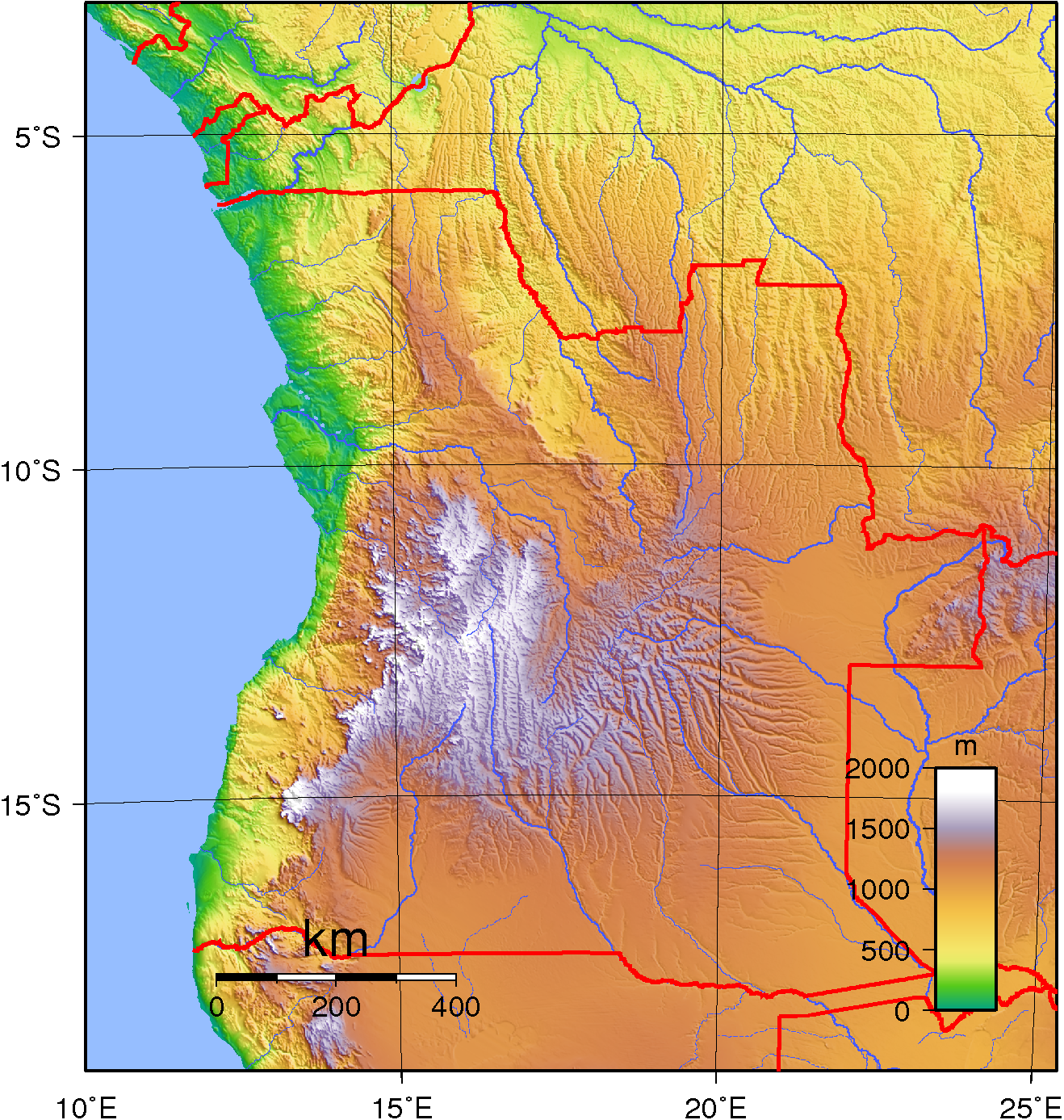
Topographic map of Angola

- Porto Amboim
- Vila Teixeira da Silva
- São Felipe de Benguela
- Vila Robert Williams
- Duque de Bragança
- Vila General Machado
- Vila João de Almeida
- Vila Mariano Machado
- Nova Lisboa
- Silva Porto
- Vila da Ponte
- Lobito
- Sá da Bandeira
- Vila Luso
- Malanje
- Forte República
- São Salvador do Congo
- Serpa Pinto
- Moçâmedes
- Vila Salazar
- Vila Pereira d'Eça
- Vila Henrique de Carvalho
- Santo António do Zaire
- Novo Redondo
- Porto Alexandre
- Carmona

The exclave of Cabinda was to the north. Portuguese Congo (Cabinda) was established a Portuguese protectorate by the 1885 Treaty of Simulambuco. Sometime during the 1920s, it became incorporated into the larger colony (later the overseas province) of Portuguese Angola. The two colonies had initially been contiguous, but later became geographically separated by a narrow corridor of land, which Portugal ceded to the Congo Free State, allowing it access to the Atlantic Ocean. Following the decolonisation of Portuguese Angola with the 1975 Alvor Agreement, the short-lived Republic of Cabinda unilaterally declared its independence. However, Cabinda was soon overpowered and re-annexed by the newly proclaimed People's Republic of Angola and never achieved international recognition.

== Economy ==
Portuguese explorers and settlers founded trading posts and forts along the coast of Africa beginning in the 15th century, and reached the Angolan coast in the 16th. Portuguese explorer Paulo Dias de Novais founded Luanda in 1575 as "São Paulo de Loanda", and the region developed a slave trade with the help of local Imbangala and Mbundu peoples, who were notable slave hunters. Trade was mostly with the Portuguese colony of Brazil in the New World. Brazilian ships were the most numerous in the ports of Luanda and Benguela. By this time, Angola, a Portuguese colony, was in fact more like a colony of Brazil, another Portuguese colony. A strong Brazilian influence was also exercised by the Jesuits in religion and education.

The philosophy of war gradually gave way to the philosophy of trade. The great trade routes and the agreements that made them possible were the driving force for activities between the different areas; warlike states become states ready to produce and to sell. In the Brazilian Highlands, Planalto or high plains, the most important states were those of Bié and Bailundo, the latter being noted for its production of foodstuffs and rubber. The colonial power, Portugal, becoming ever richer and more powerful, would not tolerate the growth of these neighbouring states and subjugated them one by one, enabling Portuguese hegemony over much of the area. During the period of the Iberian Union (1580–1640), Portugal lost influence and power and made new enemies. The Dutch, a major enemy of Castile, invaded many Portuguese overseas possessions, including Luanda. The Dutch ruled Luanda from 1640 to 1648 as Fort Aardenburgh. They were seeking black slaves for use in sugarcane plantations of Northeastern Brazil (Pernambuco, Olinda and Recife), which they had also seized from Portugal. John Maurice, Prince of Nassau-Siegen, conquered the Portuguese possessions of Saint George del Mina, Saint Thomas, and Luanda on the west coast of Africa. After the dissolution of the Iberian Union in 1640, Portugal reestablished its authority over the lost territories of the Portuguese Empire.

The Portuguese started to develop townships, trading posts, logging camps, and small processing factories. From 1764 onwards, there was a gradual change from a slave-based society to one based on production for domestic consumption and export. Portuguese Brazil became independent in 1822, and the slave trade was abolished in 1836.

In 1844, Angola's ports were opened to legal foreign shipping. By 1850, Luanda was one of the most developed cities outside Mainland Portugal in the Portuguese Empire: it was full of trading companies, exporting (together with Benguela) palm and peanut oil, wax, copal, timber, ivory, cotton, coffee, and cocoa, among many other products. Maize, tobacco, dried meat and cassava flour also began to be produced locally. The Angolan bourgeoisie was born. From the 1920s to the 1960s, strong economic growth, abundant natural resources and development of infrastructure, led to the arrival of even more Portuguese settlers from the metropole.

Diamond mining began in 1912, when the first gems were discovered by Portuguese prospectors in a stream of the Lunda region, in the northeast. In 1917, the Companhia de Diamantes de Angola (Diamang) was granted the concession for diamond mining and prospecting in Portuguese Angola. Diamang had exclusive mining and labor rights in a huge concession in Angola and used this monopoly to become the colony's largest commercial operator and also its leading revenue generator. Its wealth was generated by African laborers, many of whom were forcibly recruited to work on the mines with Lunda's aggressive state-company recruitment methods (See also chivalo/shibalo). as late as 1947, the company saw no benefit to mechanizing its operations, because local labour was so inexpensive. Work was done with shovels into the 1970s. Even the voluntary contract workers, or contratados, were exploited and had to build their own housing and often cheated of their wages. However Diamang, which was exempt from taxes and grew affluent in the 1930s also realized that in a remote area like Lunda, the supply of workers was not inexhaustible and so the workers there were somewhat better treated than on some of the other mines or on the sugar plantations.

On the whole, African laborers performed brutal work in poor conditions for very little pay that they were frequently cheated of. The American sociologist Edward Ross visited rural Angola in 1924 on behalf of the Temporary Slavery Commission of the League of Nations and wrote a scathing report describing the labor system as "virtually state serfdom", that did not allow Africans time to produce their own food. In addition, when their wages were embezzled and they were denied access to the colonial judicial system.

From the mid-1950s until 1974, iron ore was mined in Malanje, Bié, Huambo, and Huíla provinces, and production reached an average of 5.7 million tons per year between 1970 and 1974. Most of the iron ore was shipped to Japan, West Germany, and the United Kingdom, and earned almost US$50 million a year in export revenue. During 1966–67 a major iron ore terminal was built by the Portuguese at Saco, the bay just 12 km North of Moçâmedes (Namibe). The client was the Compania Mineira do Lobito, the Lobito Mining Company, which developed an iron ore mine inland at Cassinga. The construction of the mine installations and a 300 km railway were commissioned to Krupp of Germany and the modern harbour terminal to SETH, a Portuguese company owned by Højgaard & Schultz of Denmark. The small fishing town of Moçâmedes hosted construction workers, foreign engineers and their families for two years. The Ore Terminal was completed on time within one year and the first 250,000 ton ore carrier docked and loaded with ore in 1967. The Portuguese discovered petroleum in Angola in 1955. Production began in the Cuanza basin in the 1950s, in the Congo Basin in the 1960s, and in the exclave of Cabinda in 1968. The Portuguese government granted operating rights for Block Zero to the Cabinda Gulf Oil Company, a subsidiary of ChevronTexaco, in 1955. Oil production surpassed the exportation of coffee as Angola's largest export in 1973.

By the early 1970s, a variety of crops and livestock were produced in Portuguese Angola. In the north, cassava, coffee, and cotton were grown; in the central highlands, maize was cultivated; and in the south, where rainfall is lowest, cattle herding was prevalent. In addition, there were large plantations run by Portuguese that produced palm oil, sugarcane, bananas, and sisal. These crops were grown by commercial farmers, primarily Portuguese, and by peasant farmers, who sold some of their surplus to local Portuguese traders in exchange for supplies. The commercial farmers were dominant in marketing these crops, however, and enjoyed substantial support from the overseas province's Portuguese government in the form of technical assistance, irrigation facilities, and financial credit. They produced the great majority of the crops that were marketed in Angola's urban centres or exported for several countries.

Fishing in Portuguese Angola was a major and growing industry. In the early 1970s, there were about 700 fishing boats, and the annual catch was more than 300,000 tons. Including the catch of foreign fishing fleets in Angolan waters, the combined annual catch was estimated at over 1 million tons. The Portuguese territory of Angola was a net exporter of fish products, and the ports of Moçâmedes, Luanda and Benguela were among the most important fishing harbours in the region.

== Education ==
Non-urban black African access to educational opportunities was very limited for most of the colonial period, most were not able to speak Portuguese and did not have knowledge of Portuguese culture and history. Until the 1950s, educational facilities run by the Portuguese colonial government were largely restricted to the urban areas. Responsibility for educating rural Africans were commissioned by the authorities to several Roman Catholic and Protestant missions based across the vast countryside, which taught black Africans in Portuguese language and culture. As a consequence, each of the missions established its own school system, although all were subject to ultimate control and support by the Portuguese.

In mainland Portugal, the homeland of the colonial authorities who ruled in the territory from the 16th century until 1975, by the end of the 19th century the illiteracy rates were at over 80 percent and higher education was reserved for a small percentage of the population. 68.1 percent of mainland Portugal's population was still classified as illiterate by the 1930 census. Mainland Portugal's literacy rate by the 1940s and early 1950s was low by North American and Western European standards at the time. Only in the 1960s did the country make public education available for all children between the ages of six and twelve, and the overseas territories profited from this new educational developments and change in policy at Lisbon.

Starting in the early 1950s, the access to basic, secondary and technical education was expanded and its availability was being increasingly opened to both the African indigenes and the ethnic Portuguese of the territories. Education beyond the primary level became available to an increasing number of black Africans since the 1950s, and the proportion of the age group that went on to secondary school in the early 1970s was an all-time record high enrollment. Primary school attendance was also growing substantially. In general, the quality of teaching at the primary level was acceptable, even with instruction carried on largely by black Africans who sometimes had substandard qualifications. Most secondary school teachers were ethnically Portuguese, especially in the urban centers.

Two state-run university institutions were founded in Portuguese Africa in 1962 by the Portuguese Ministry of the Overseas Provinces headed by Adriano Moreira—the Estudos Gerais Universitários de Angola in Portuguese Angola and the Estudos Gerais Universitários de Moçambique in Portuguese Mozambique—awarding a wide range of degrees from engineering to medicine. In the 1960s, the Portuguese mainland had four public universities, two of them in Lisbon (which compares with the 14 Portuguese public universities today). In 1968, the Estudos Gerais Universitários de Angola was renamed Universidade de Luanda (University of Luanda).

== Sports ==
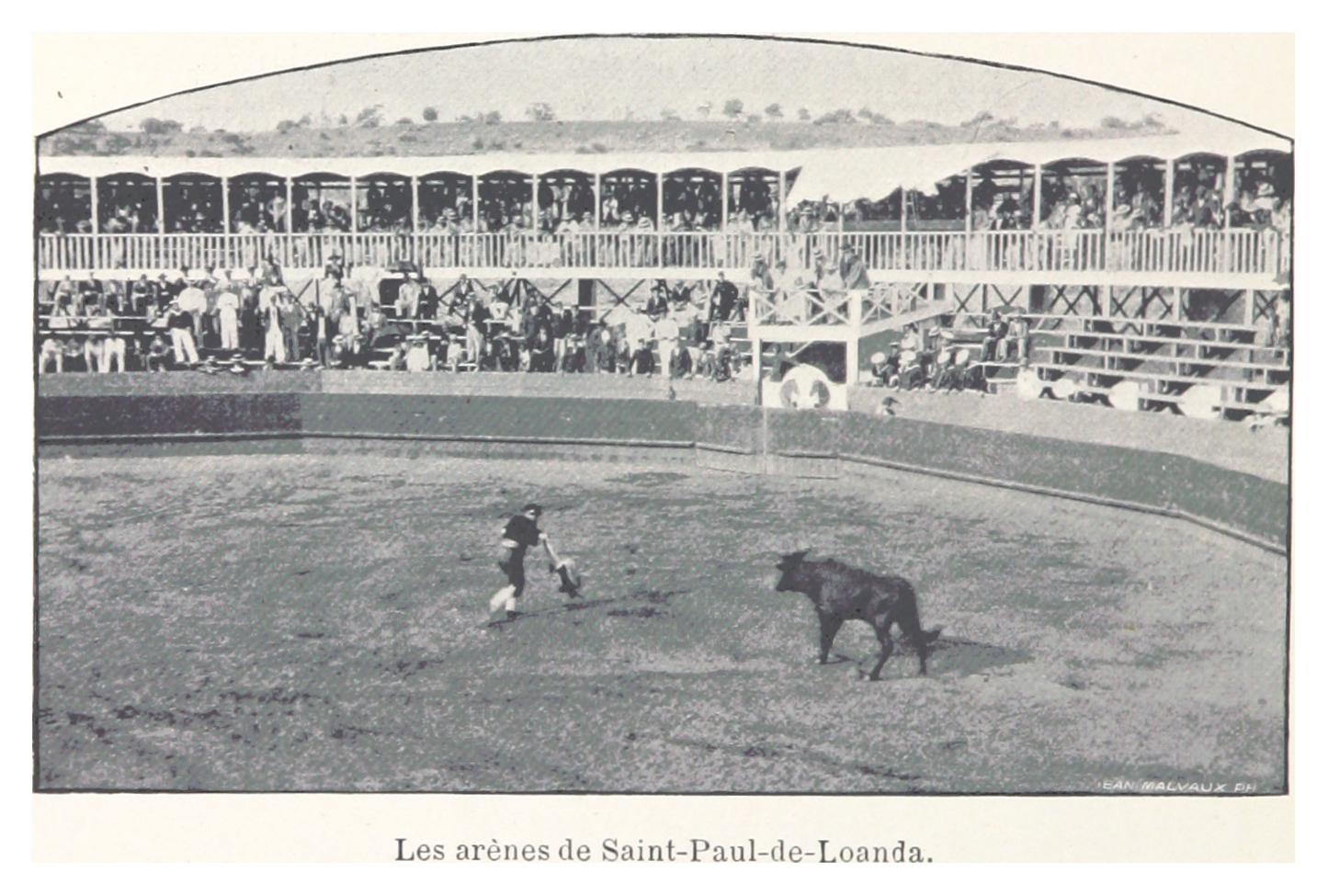
Bullfighting in Luanda, the capital of Portuguese Angola, in 1899

From the 1920s onward, city and town expansion and modernization included the construction of several sports facilities for football, rink hockey, basketball, volleyball, handball, athletics, gymnastics and swimming. Several sports clubs were founded across the entire territory, among them were some of the largest and oldest sports organizations of Angola, like Sporting Clube de Luanda, established in 1920 as a branch of Sporting Clube de Portugal. Several sportsmen, especially football players, that achieved wide notability in Portuguese sports were from Angola. José Águas, Rui Jordão and Jacinto João were examples of that, and excelled in the Portugal national football team. Since the 1960s, with the latest developments on commercial aviation, the highest ranked football teams of Angola and the other African overseas provinces of Portugal, started to compete in the Taça de Portugal (the Portuguese Cup). Other facilities and organizations for swimming, nautical sports, tennis and wild hunting became widespread. Beginning in the 1950s, motorsport was introduced to Angola. Sport races were organized in cities like Nova Lisboa, Benguela, Sá da Bandeira and Moçâmedes. The International Nova Lisboa 6 Hours sports car race became noted internationally.

Football became very popular in Angola during the 20th century. Football was mostly spread to Angola by the Portuguese people who settled in the colonies. This was mostly due to the fact that immigration to the colonies was encouraged, both Angola and Mozambique saw an influx of Portuguese migrants. People started to follow teams that were from the Portuguese mainland. In the latter half of the 20th century, Portugal would recruit many players form Angola. Miguel Arcanjo was one such player who played in Portugal. The colonial players would help Portuguese teams win many championships.

== Famous people ==
- António da Silva Porto
- Anthony Johnson
- Agostinho Neto
- Armando Gama
- Assunção Cristas
- Bonga
- Carlos Castro
- Carlos Cruz
- Daniel Chipenda
- Deolinda Rodrigues Francisco de Almeida
- Eduardo Nascimento
- Fernando Nobre
- Fernando José de França Dias Van-Dúnem
- Fernando Peyroteo
- Francisca Van Dunem
- Graça de Freitas
- Henrique Galvão
- Holden Roberto
- Horácio Roque
- Isabel dos Santos
- Jacinto João
- Joana Amaral Dias
- João Carqueijeiro
- Jonas Savimbi
- Jordão

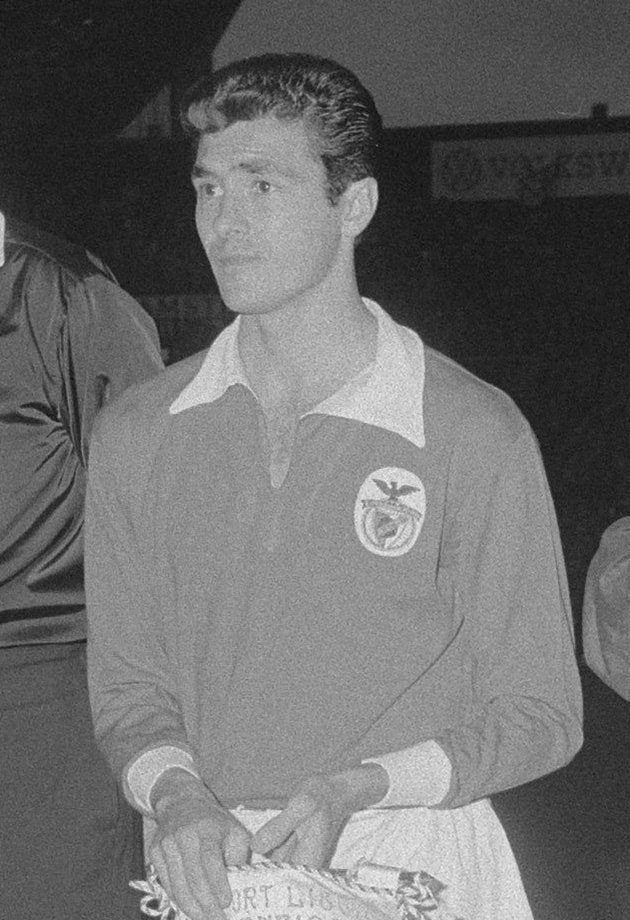
José Águas, born in Luanda, Portuguese Angola, in 1930

- José Águas
- José Eduardo Agualusa
- José Eduardo dos Santos
- José Norton de Matos
- José Quitongo
- Mário Pinto de Andrade
- Marcolino Moco
- Miguel Arcanjo
- Miguel Relvas
- Mwene Mbandu I Lyondthzi Kapova of Mbunda
- Nzinga of Ndongo and Matamba
- Paula Teixeira da Cruz
- Paulo Maló
- Paulo Kassoma
- Pedro Passos Coelho
- Pepetela
- Raul Águas
- Viriato da Cruz
- Waldemar Bastos
- Zeca Afonso

== See also ==
- Arquivo Histórico Ultramarino (archives in Lisbon documenting Portuguese Empire, including Angola)
- Estado Novo (Portugal)
- History of Angola
- List of colonial governors of Angola
- Portuguese Cape Verde
- Portuguese Guinea
- Portuguese Mozambique
- Portuguese São Tomé and Príncipe
- Campaigns of Pacification and Occupation
- Pink Map 19th century attempt to connect Angola and Mozambique
