= António Júlio da Costa Pereira de Eça =

Portuguese Army general

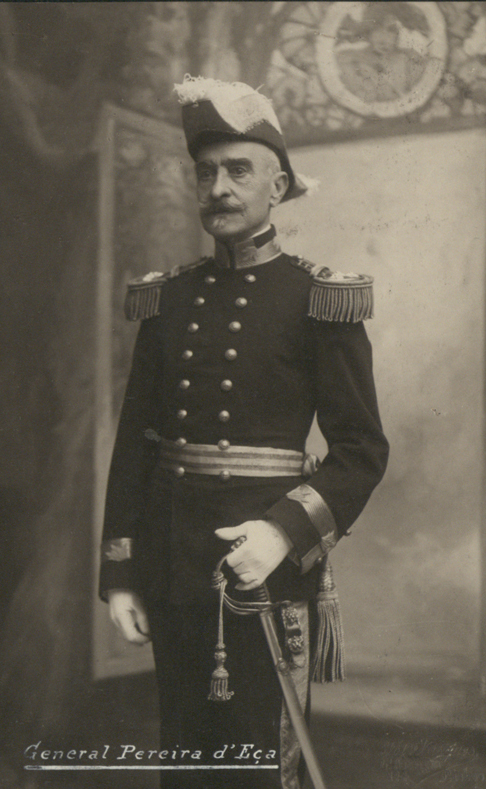
General Pereira Portrait

António Júlio da Costa Pereira de Eça GCIC (Lisbon, 31 March 1852 — 6 November 1917) - commonly known as Pereira d'Eça - was a general of the Portuguese Army, a colonial administrator colonial and minister of War (1914-1915).
