= Cuanhama =

- Municipality
- Location in Angola
- Coordinates: 16°28′23″S 16°27′29″E
- Country: Angola
- Province: Cunene

Area
  - Total: 4,524 km^{2} (1,747 sq mi)

Population (2024 Census)
  - Total: 500,288
  - Density: 110.6/km^{2} (286.4/sq mi)
- Time zone: UTC+1 (WAT)

Cuanhama, also known as Kwanhama, is a municipality in Cunene Province, Angola. Cuanhama occupies 4,524 square kilometers and has 500,288 inhabitants as of the 2024 census. It is bordered to the north by the municipality of Cuvelai, east by the municipality of Menongue, the south by the municipality of Namacunde, and west by the municipality of Ombadja. Ondjiva, the administrative capital of Cunene Province, is located in Cuanhama. Other communes in Cuanhama include Môngua, Evale, Nehone and Tchimporo-Yonde.

== Demographics ==
The municipality of Cuanhama recorded high population growth in recent years and is currently the most populous in the whole province of Cunene.
