= 8 South African Infantry Battalion =

8 South African Infantry Battalion (8 SAI)
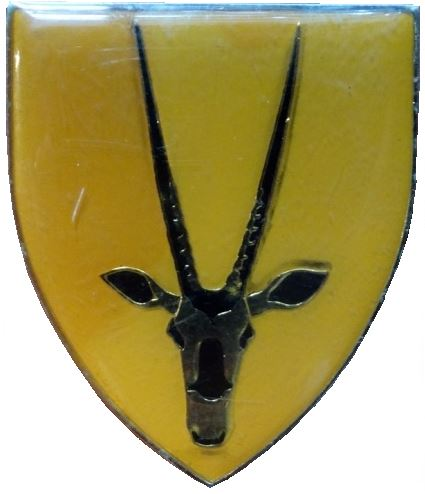
- 8 SAI Insignia
- Active: 01 October 1973 – present
- Country: South Africa
- Allegiance: South Africa
- Branch: South African Army
- Type: Infantry
- Role: Mechanised infantry
- Size: Battalion
- Part of: South African Infantry Formation
- Garrison/HQ: Upington, Northern Cape Province
- Motto: 'Perservate et Superate (Conquer through perseverance)
- Mascot: Gemsbok
- Equipment: Ratel IFV, Ratel 90, (Note: ex 61 Mech) Ratel 81, Ratel 60
- Engagements: South African Border War; Operation Savannah (1975); Operation Reindeer (1979); Operation Carrot (1980); Operation Sceptic (1980); Operation Protea (1981); Operation Daisy (1981); Operation Yahoo (1982); Operation Meebos (1982); Operation Afskeur (1983); Operation Phoenix (1983); Operation Dolfyn (1983); Operation Askari (1983/4); Operation Pronkertjie (1985); Operation Viper (1985); Operation Benzine (1986); Operation Moduler (1987); Operation Hooper (1988); Operation Excite (1988); Operation Linger (1988); Operation Merlyn (1989) (Note: as part of 63 Mech); Operation Agree (1989); Namibian Independence; Operation Agree (1990); UN/AU peacekeeping; Operation Curriculum (2001); Operation Mistral (2003); Operation Cordite (2006); Operation Triton (2007)

Insignia
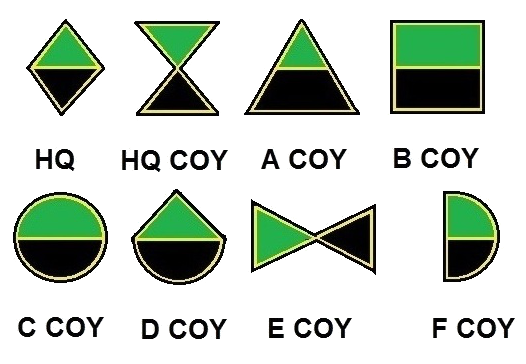
- Company level Insignia

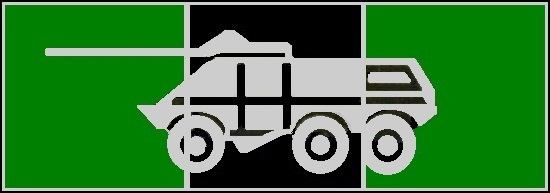
- SA Mechanised Infantry beret bar circa 1992: SA mechanised infantry beret bar circa 1992

8 South African Infantry Battalion is a mechanized infantry unit of the South African Army. The battalion is equipped with Ratel Infantry Fighting Vehicles (IFV) used for fast transport and combat mobility across rough ground. Support weapons for mechanized infantry are also provided with motorized transport, or are built directly into these IFVs, in order to keep pace with the IFVs in combat. The battalion was raised at Upington in the Northern Cape on 1 October 1973 as part of the South African Infantry Corps, and since the change in structure, has been assigned to the Infantry Formation.

8 SAI continues to train for conventional warfare and forms part of the annual brigade-level Lohatla Army Battle School exercise. Training includes IFV-mounted and dismounted fire-and-move drills, and integration with Engineers, Armour, Artillery and Air Force elements.

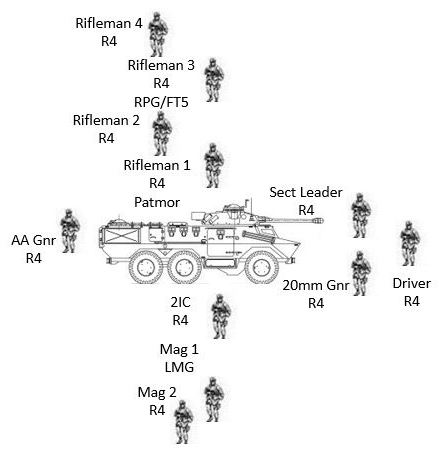
Ratel 20 IFV typical fighting section layout

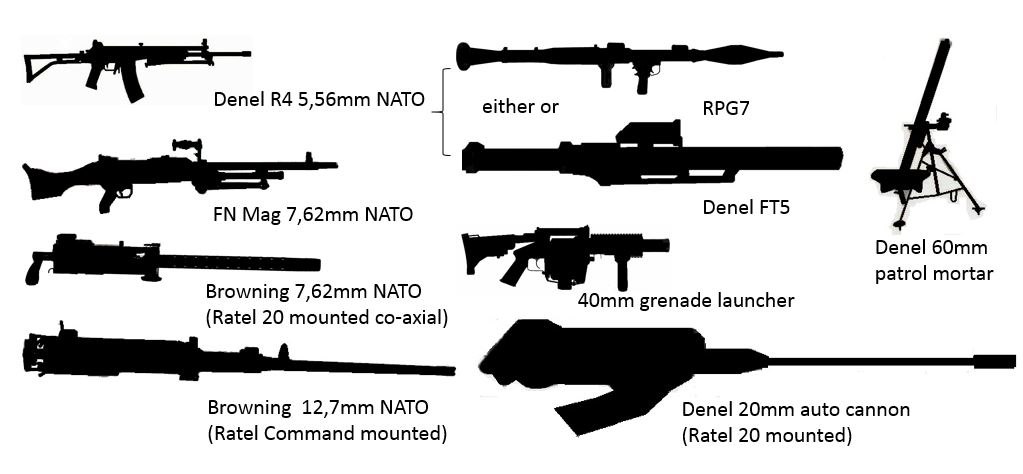
SA Mechanised Infantry Ordnance

== History ==
=== Activation ===
The unit was established at Upington in the Northern Cape on 1 October 1973 and received its first batch of national service trainees the next January. They could, however, not cope with the Gordonia heat and the unit afterwards received trainees in July.(1986 Intake was in January. 1987 Intake was in February) The base for its first decade consisted mainly of tents, in 1979 the harsh conditions of extreme desert heat and dust storms coupled with limited facilities led to 111 national servicemen from Alpha Company going on AWOL. A resultant Board of Inquiry led to the Base being vastly upgraded in the following years.

=== Motorised Infantry ===
In its first decade 8 SAI was a motorised Infantry battalion. The Battalion primarily deployed with Buffel APCs at that stage.

==== Battalion Storm Pioneer Platoon ====
8 SAI had a storm/assault pioneer capability in the 1980s, usually designated Oscar Company. Assault pioneers were the integral combat engineering component of the battalion. Assault pioneers were trained in tasks such as:

- Field defences and obstacles,
- Mine detection and removal,
- Primary demolitions,
- Non standard bridging,
- Anchorages and suspension traverses

The Pioneer Platoon provided small tasks and close support capabilities to the battalion ensuring immediacy of response and decreasing the workload of the engineer squadrons. By the 1990s this function was retired to the Engineering Corps however.

==== Battalion Tactical Reconnaissance Platoon ====
8 SAI experimented with the tactical reconnaissance platoon concept for infantry units around 1981–1982 at Riemvasmaak. These abbreviated pathfinder/reconnaissance courses were given by the SA Special Forces to certain SADF units. A nickname given for this training was the "junior recce" course.

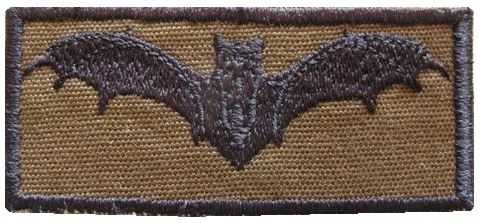
SADF era Infantry Pathfinder/ "Junior Recce" proficiency badge conducted at Riemvasmaak in the early 80s

=== Mechanised infantry ===
By 1976 infantry operations were being transformed drastically when the Ratel Infantry Fighting Vehicle (IFV) was introduced for the first time and in November the first Ratel course was presented at 1 SAI. Similar to 1 SAI, 8 SAI was transformed into a mechanised unit by the mid-1980s and mechanised leaders followed a similar training route.

All students attended the course until the Section Leaders Phase had been completed. Section Leaders were then awarded their Lance Corporal stripes and then placed with regular rifle companies. The rest of the future NCOs also received their stripes and future Officers received their white Candidate Officer's tabs. These students were then evaluated and split into the Mechanised Platoon Commanders Course and Specialist Instructors Course. These platoon commanders were destined to either become future leaders of 8 SAIs rifle companies or instructors at the Training Wing, while the Specialist Instructors would become Officers and NCO's responsible for training of Ratel gunners and drivers.

- All students qualifying as Section Leaders were authorised to wear one parallel yellow bar above their two Corporal stripes.
- Students that qualified as Platoon NCOs were authorised to wear two parallel yellow bars. The Platoon NCOs were responsible for the support of the vehicles, guns and signal equipment of a specific platoon.
- Students that completed either the Platoon Commanders or Specialist Instructors Course were permitted to wear three parallel yellow bars above their stripes, signifying their platoon sergeant status. Platoon sergeants were responsible for the training and discipline of an allocated platoon.

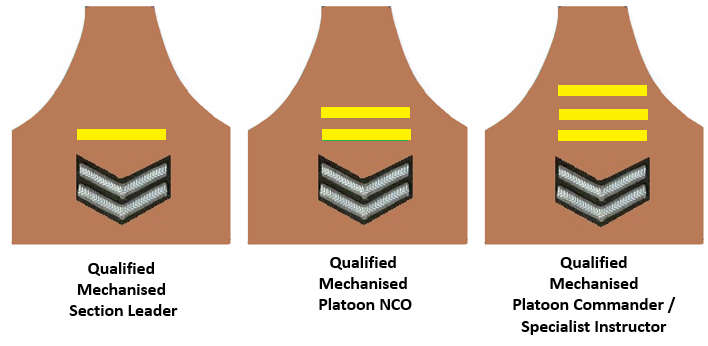
SADF era 8 SAI Mechanised Leader Brassards 1980s

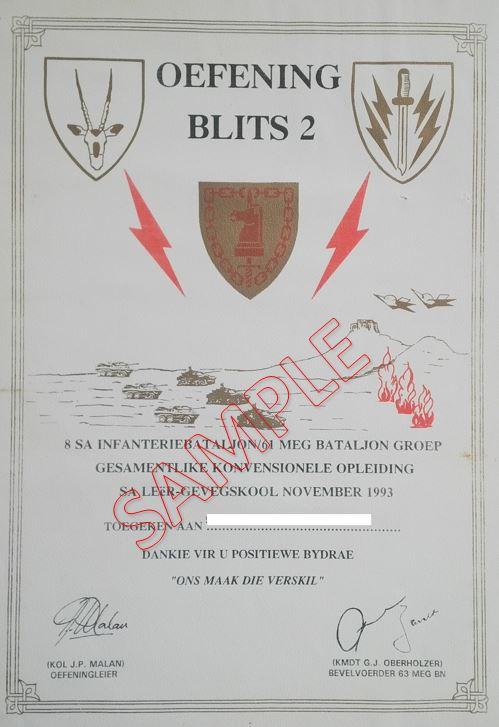
Blits 2 exercise certificate, Lohatla Army Battle School 1993

=== The Border War/Angolan Civil War ===
Between 1979 and 1989, 8 SAI participated in the Border War. 8 SAI directly contributed troops to the following operations:

- Operation Savannah (1975), 8 SAI and 5 SAI companies relieve 2 SAI from Battle Group Beaver.
- Operation Reindeer (1979), attack on Cassinga, Southern Angola,
- (1979–1980) Supply troops with 6 SAI through Madimbo in the Limpopo Valley into Rhodesia to protect farming communities in the south of that country from ZANLA infiltration.
- Operation Sceptic (1980), destroy control and logistic structures at Chifufua, Southern Angola,
- Operation Carrot (1981), counter insurgency warfare in the farming districts of Tsumeb, Otavi and Grootfontein, in Sector 30, Namibia,
- Operation Protea (1981), destroy SWAPO command and training center at Xangongo and logistic bases at Xangongo and Ongiva. Southern Angola
- Operation Daisy (1981), attack on SWAPO center at Chitequeta, Southern Angola
- Operation Yahoo (1982), mobile skirmishes countering SWAPO infiltration in SWA in the Ogandjere tribal area, north of the Etosha pans and the Bakenkop farm. 55 insurgents killed and 16 apprehended. 1 Ratel lost by concentrated RPG fire.
- Operation Meebos (1982), attack SWAPO bases identified by reconnaissance teams, Southern Angola
- Operation Phoenix (1983), counter offensive to SWAPO infiltration into Owamboland, Namibia, 309 SWAPO killed.
- Operation Dolfyn (1983), attack PLAN bases and headquarters around the Angolan town of Cuvelai
- Operation Askari (1983/4), disrupt logistical support and command & control capabilities of PLAN to suppress an incursion planned for Jan 1984.
- Operation Pronkertjie (1985),
- Operation Viper (1985),
- Operation Benzine (1986),

==== Bases in South West Africa ====
Elements of 8 SAI was seconded to routine operations during this period to the following bases:

- Mahanene
- Rundu
- Okalongo
- Oshigambo
- Etale
- Ondangwa
- Tsintsabis
- Okongo
- Ogongo
- Ombalantu

==== Battle surrounding Cuito Cuanavale ====
- Operation Moduler (1987), Lead up to the Battle of Cuito Cuanavale
- Operation Hooper (1988), Part of the Battle of Cuito Cuanavale

==== Attack on Calueque Dam ====
The Cubans opened a second front on 27 June 1988 against the South Africans and launched a ground offensive in the direction of Calueque Dam in Southern Angola. The area to the north of the dam became the scene of fighting. MiG-23 aircraft attacked the facilities, bombing a bridge, sluice gates, a pump, a generator, and a pipeline to Ovamboland in three waves. 7 soldiers from 8 SAI and 4 from 1 SSB/10 Armoured Squadron lost their lives in this engagement.

- Operation Excite/Hilti (1988), Draw Cubans out of Techipa, Southern Angola and ambush, preventing an advance to Calueque and SWA/Namibian border.
- Operation Linger (1988)

==== 8 SAI and 63 Mech ====
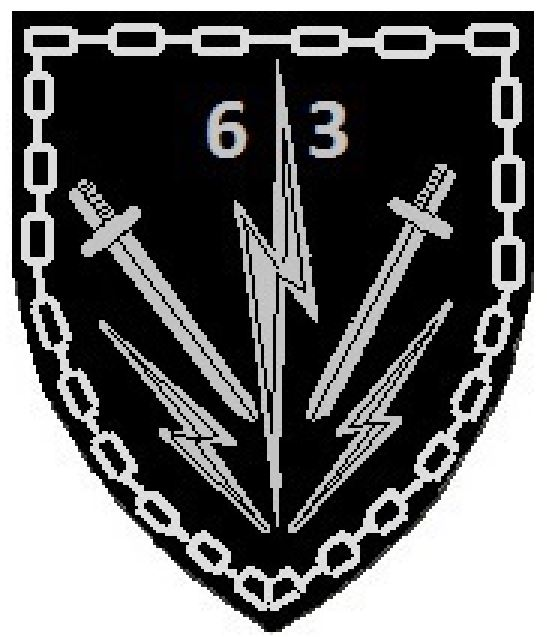
63 Mech Battalion Group emblem

By 1989, 8 SAI had also become a feeder unit for 63 Mechanised Battalion Group, part of 60 Brigade.

- Operation Merlyn (1989). Prevent the incursion of PLAN (SWAPO) insurgents into South West Africa/Namibia in contravention of ceasefire effected 1 April 1989.
- Operation Agree 8 SAI infantry companies as part of 63 Mechanised Battalion Group, was part of the last contingent of South African troops to withdraw from Namibia at independence in 1989–1990 in accordance with the United Nations Security Council Resolution 435 handing over responsibility to the United Nations Transition Assistance Group (UNTAG).

==== Citizen Force secondment ====
After a national serviceman's time had ended with 8 SAI, the vast majority were eventually assigned to Citizen Force Mech Regiments such as Regiment de la Rey, Regiment Northern Transvaal and the Cape Town Highlanders.

=== South Africa internal operations ===
From 1990, the unit deployed internally in South Africa. Its main tasks at this time included counter insurgency in urban and rural areas. In late 2019 the unit was reportedly deployed in a number of communities in Cape Town to combat gang violence by supporting police operations.

=== South Africa internal operations ===
From 1990, the unit deployed internally in South Africa. Its main tasks at this time included counter-insurgency in urban and rural areas. In late 2019, the unit was reportedly deployed in a number of communities in Cape Town to combat gang violence by supporting police operations.

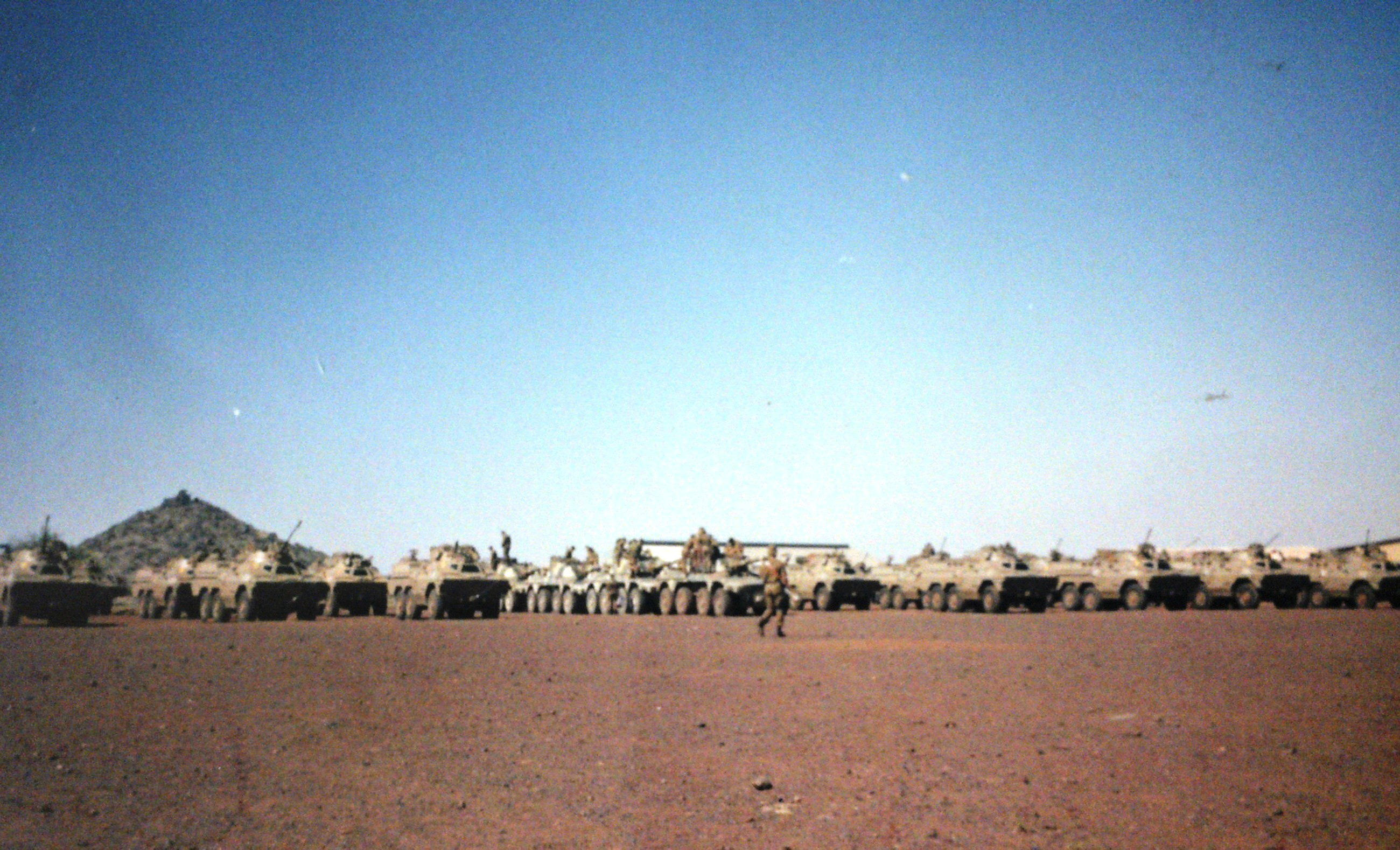
8 SAI preparing for joint training with 61 Mech Battalion, Lohatla Army Battle School, 1993

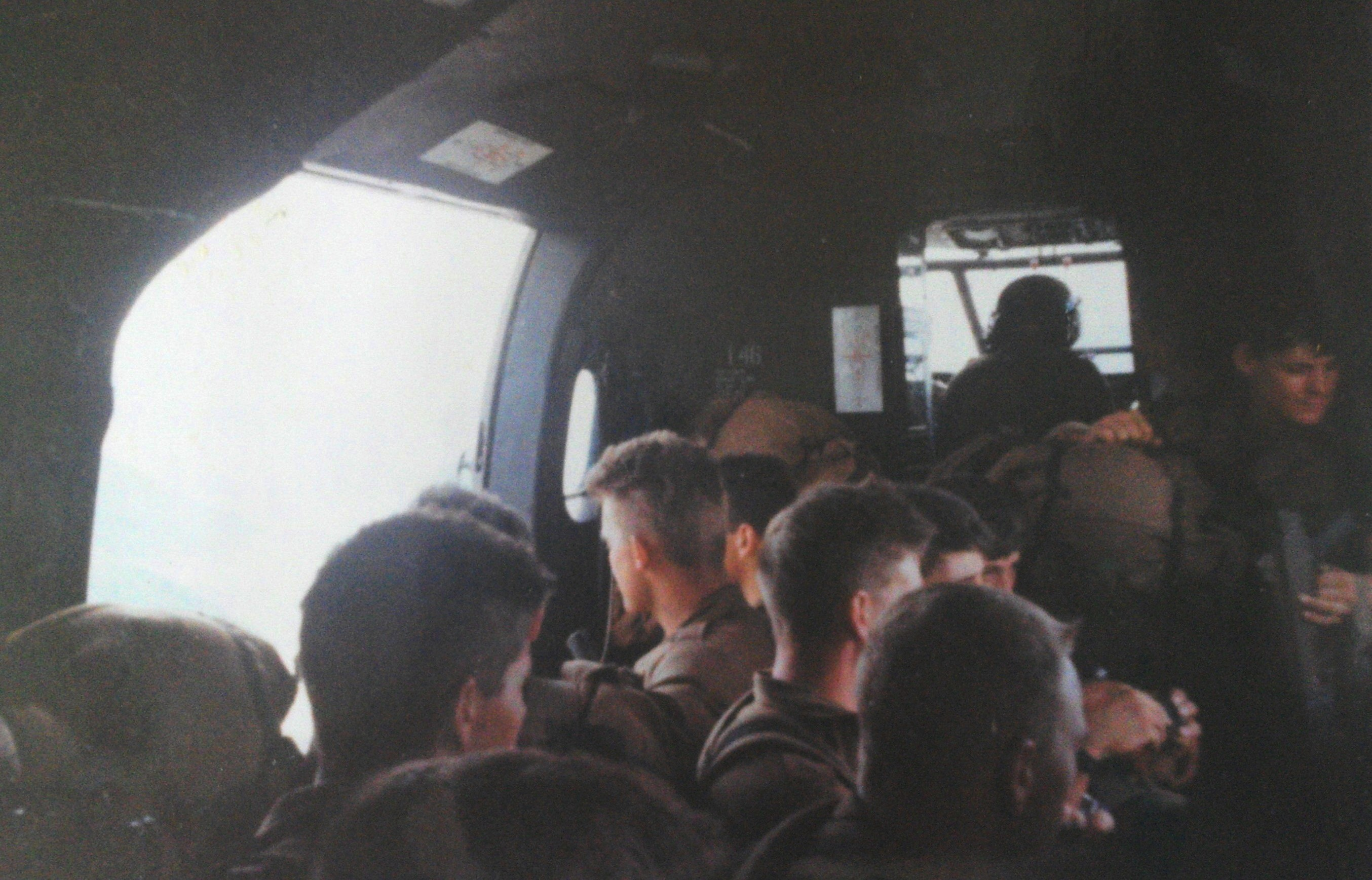
8 SAI conducting counter-insurgency operations using airborne infiltration in northern KwaZulu-Natal, 1993

=== Notable Events ===
In 2006, 8 South African Infantry (8 SAI) merged with the 61 Mechanised Battalion (61 Mech), consolidating resources and capabilities under a single command structure.

In 2023, four members of the battalion tragically died in an accident while en route to the South African Army Combat Training Centre. The incident highlighted the risks faced by military personnel during training and operational deployments.

=== Recent Operations ===
In July 2024, 8 SAI made a significant discovery during a routine patrol near Mshololo, uncovering 28 bags of abandoned dagga (cannabis) with an estimated street value of R5,880,000.00. The seizure was part of ongoing efforts to combat illegal drug trafficking in the region.

The battalion is currently stationed along the South Africa–Eswatini border, where it plays a critical role in preventing illegal cross-border movements, including smuggling and unauthorized migration. This deployment underscores the unit's ongoing contribution to national security and border integrity.

=== Since 1994 ===
In June 1994, the unit received its SANDF Colours, the first presented to a unit in the new South African National Defence Force.

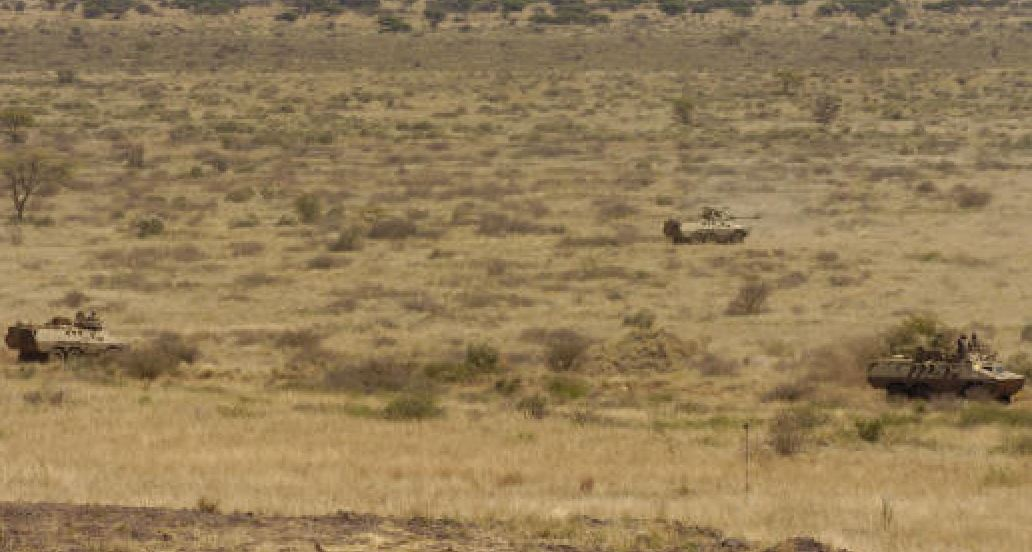
8 SAI Ratel IFVs on maneuver at Lohatla Army Battle School, Northern Cape

==== Amalgamation with 61 Mech ====
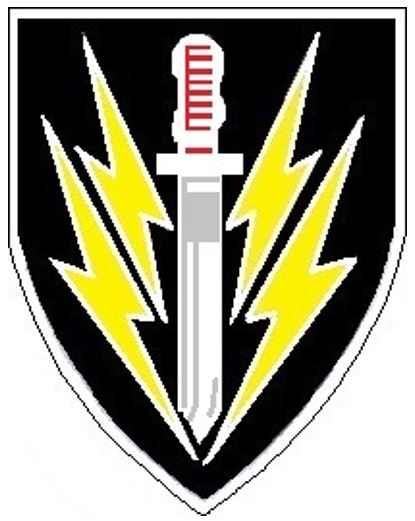
61 Mech Battalion amalgamated with 8 SAI post 1994

In 2006, 61 Mechanised Infantry Battalion Group was disbanded and most of its members and mechanised equipment were transferred to 8 SAI.

8 SAI's main training area, at Riemvasmaak, north of Upington, was transferred to a civilian community. Since then 8 SAI uses the SA Army Combat Training Centre at Lohatla as its main training area.

=== Peacekeeping ===
- Operation Curriculum, 2001–2009, 8 SAI companies were involved in peacekeeping operations for the African Union in Burundi
- Operation Mistral, 2003, 8 SAI companies were involved in peacekeeping operations for the African Union in the Democratic Republic of the Congo.
- Operation Cordite, 2006, 8 SAI companies were involved in peacekeeping operations for the African Union in the Darfur, Sudan
- Operation Triton in the Comores oversaw an African Union Mission to stabilise that country's elections. This was strengthened by a company from 8 SAI.

8 SAI was again redeployed to the Democratic Republic of Congo as part of Operation Mistral under the auspices of MONUSCO from December 2009 to May 2010 and from November 2011 to June 2012.

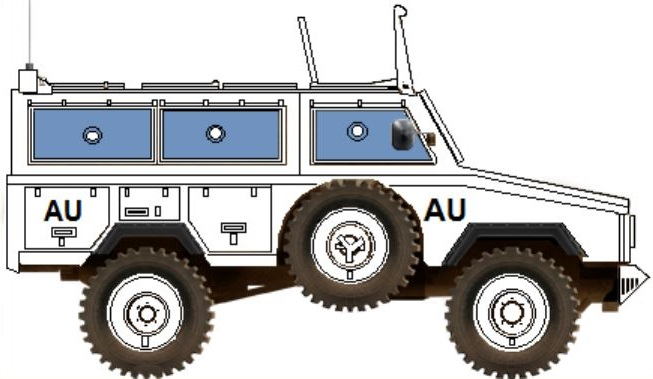
Mamba Mk 2 APC used by 8 SAI in peacekeeping operations

== 8 SAI Mechanised Fleet early 1990s ==
=== Alpha or attack vehicles ===
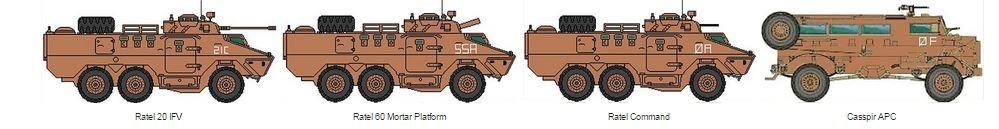

1 Ratel 20 per section, 3 sections per platoon, 3 platoons per company. 1 Ratel command per platoon, 4 per company.

=== Charlie or support vehicles ===
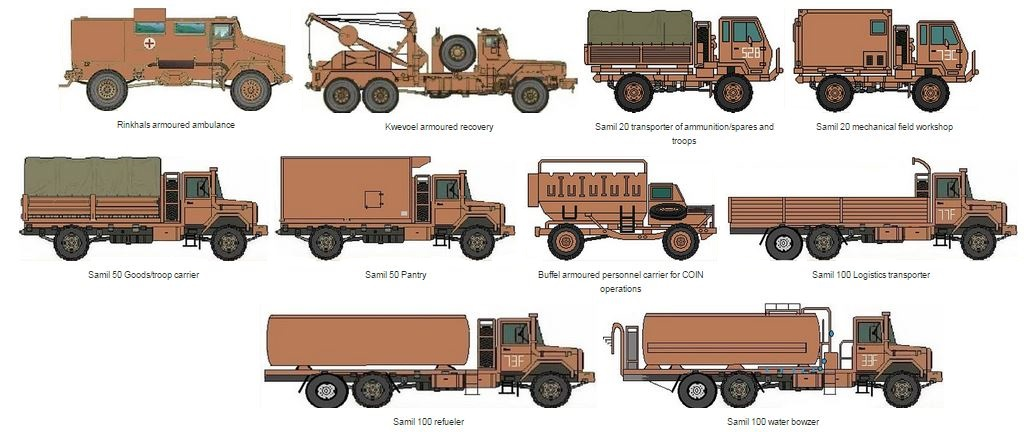

== Ordnance ==
=== Current ===
==== Vehicle mounted weapons ====
8 SAI is equipped with Ratel 20 Infantry Fighting Vehicles, Ratel 60 mm (2.4 in) Mortar Platform Vehicles, Ratel Command Vehicles with mounted 12.7 mm (0.50 in) machine guns, Ratel 90s and Ratel 81s, Kwevoel 100 Armoured Trucks for IFV Recovery, field maintenance, fuel bunkers and water provision, Samil 50 and 100 logistics trucks, Samil 20 trucks for its organic field workshops, Casspir APCs for its forward artillery observation party, and Rinkhals Field Ambulances. 8 SAI has also used Buffel IFVs and Mambas at various stages in its history. Ratel mounted weapons include the Denel Land Systems GI-2 20 mm (0.79 in) Quick Firing Cannon (QFC) (Ratel mounted), 60 mm (2.4 in) breech-loading mortar (Ratel mounted), Browning M1919 Machine gun and the Browning M2 12.7 mm (0.50 in) Machine gun.

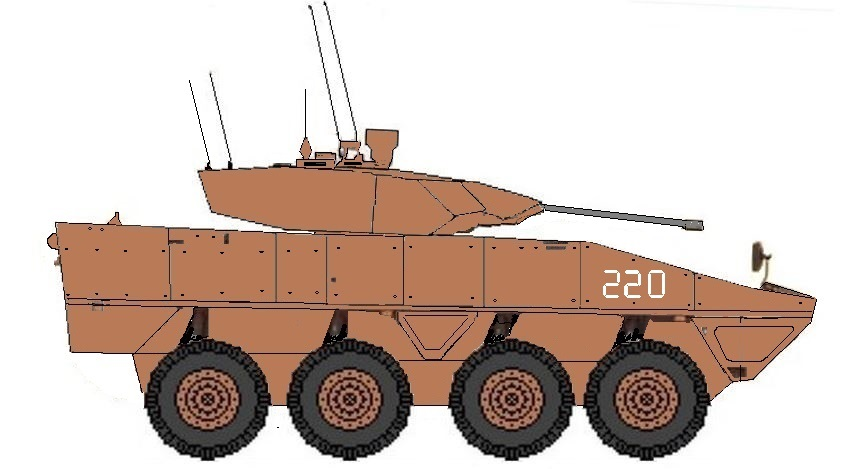
Badger IFV earmarked for replacement of the Ratel Fleet 2016 onwards

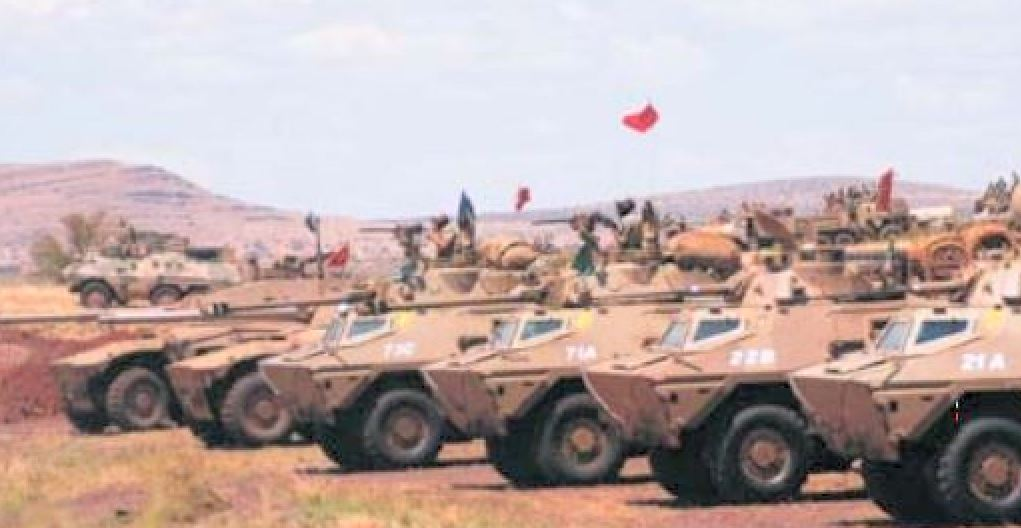
SANDF exercise Seboka 2007 8 SAI Ratels with 1 SSB Rooikats

==== Small-arms ====
8 SAI is equipped with the:

- Vektor SS77 Squad Automatic Machine gun,
- Fabrique Nationale 7.62 mm (0.300 in) Light Machine gun,
- Vektor R4 5.56 mm (0.219 in) (.223 NATO) assault rifle, 40 mm (1.6 in)
- Multiple Grenade Launcher (MGL),
- Rocket Propelled grenade launcher (RPG-7),
- M26 Fragmentation grenade,
- M1/M4 60 mm (2.4 in) patrol mortar (PATMOR), and the Denel 99 mm (3.9 in)
- FT5 rocket launcher.

=== Future ===
Under Project Hoefyster, the SANDF will eventually replace the Ratel family of vehicles with the Badger system.

Nine versions are contemplated of which three are earmarked for mechanized infantry battalions such as 8 SAI:

- Command (turreted 12.7 mm (0.50 in) MG for self-defence, multiple radios and command post equipment)
- Mortar (turreted 60 mm (2.4 in) breech loading long-range mortar)
- Missile (turreted Denel ZT3 Ingwe)
- Section (turreted 30 mm (1.2 in) cannon)
- Fire Support (turreted 30 mm (1.2 in) cannon, but with more ammunition than the section vehicle)
- Signal variant
- Ambulance variant
- Artillery variant
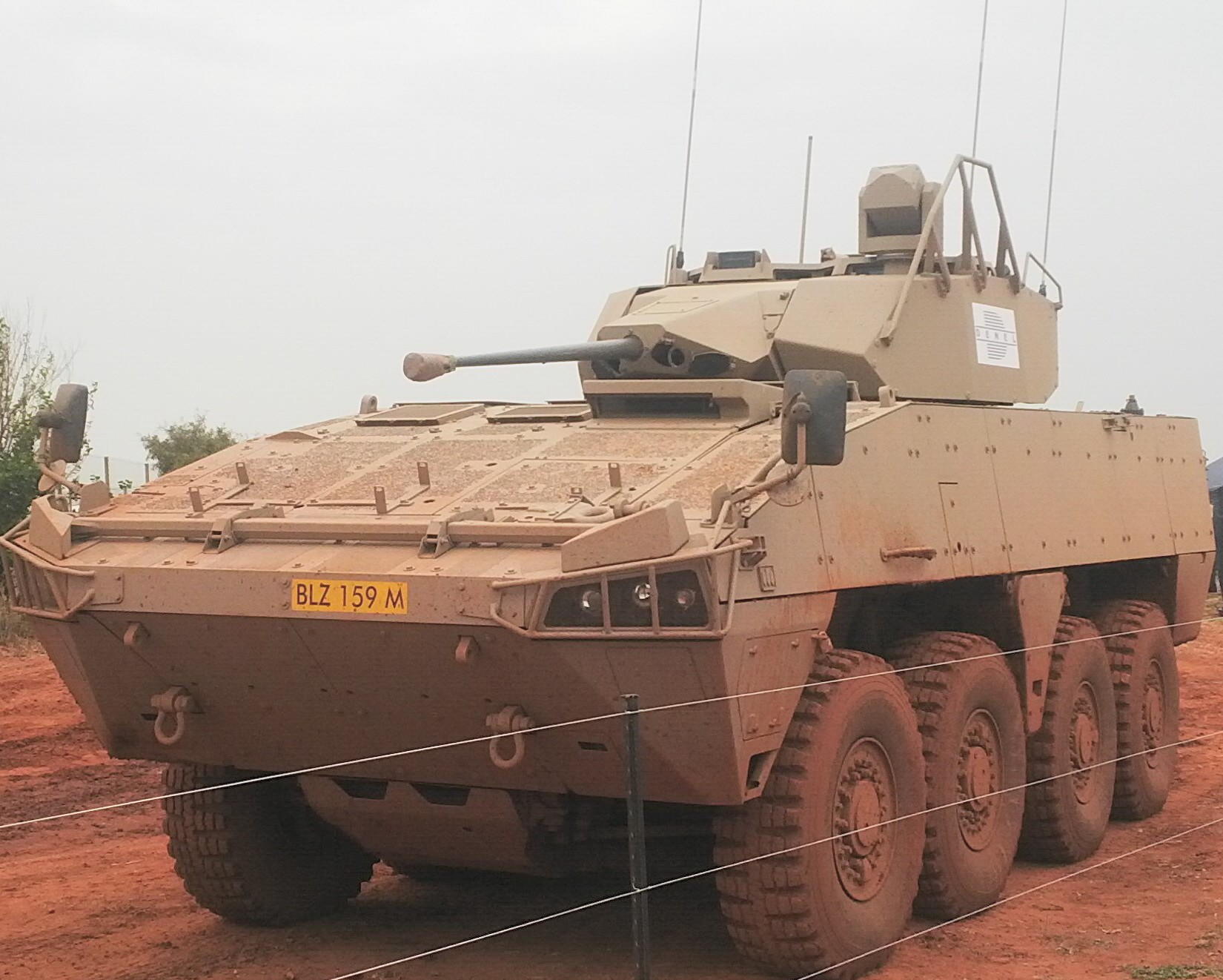
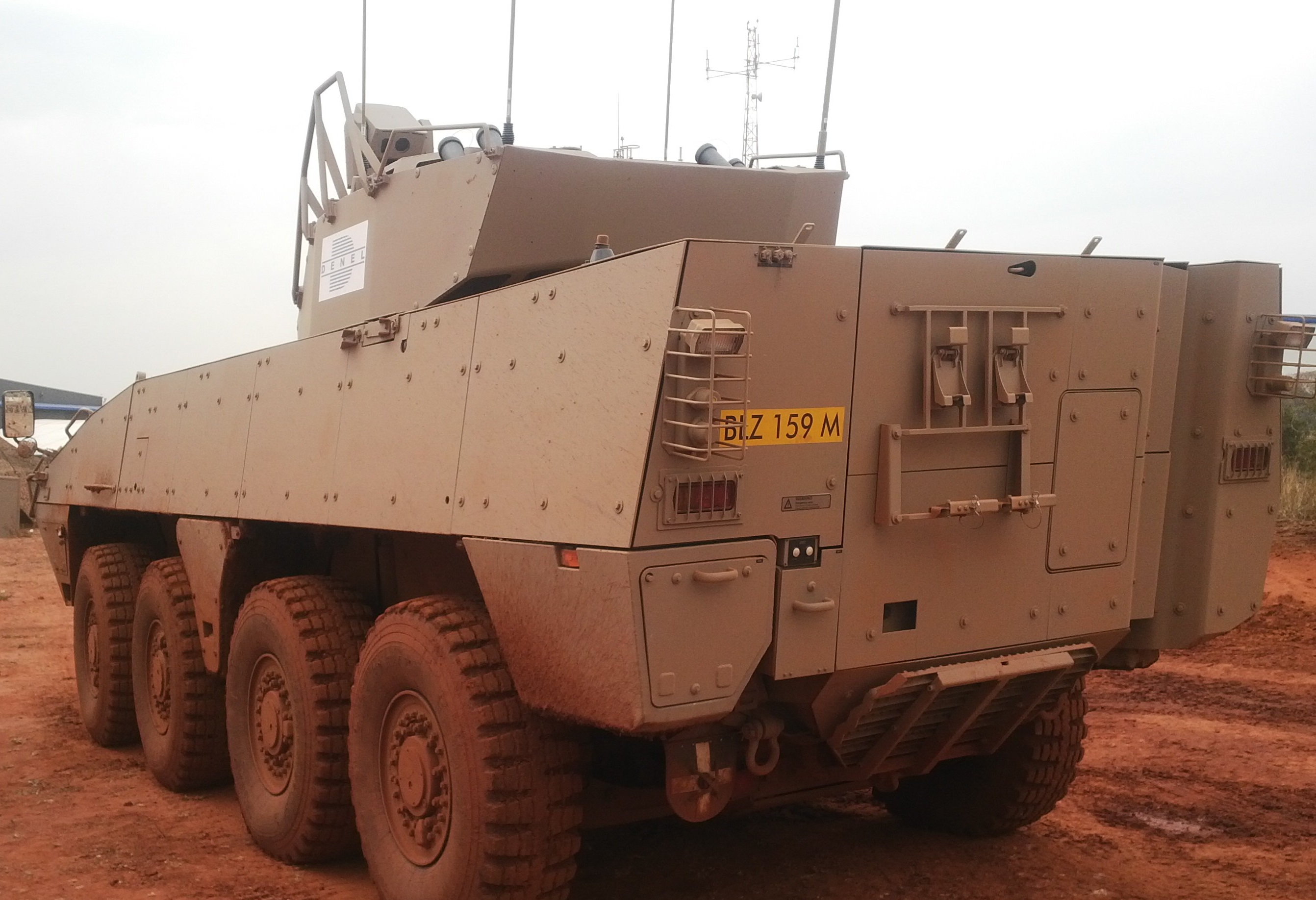
Badger IFV front and rear views

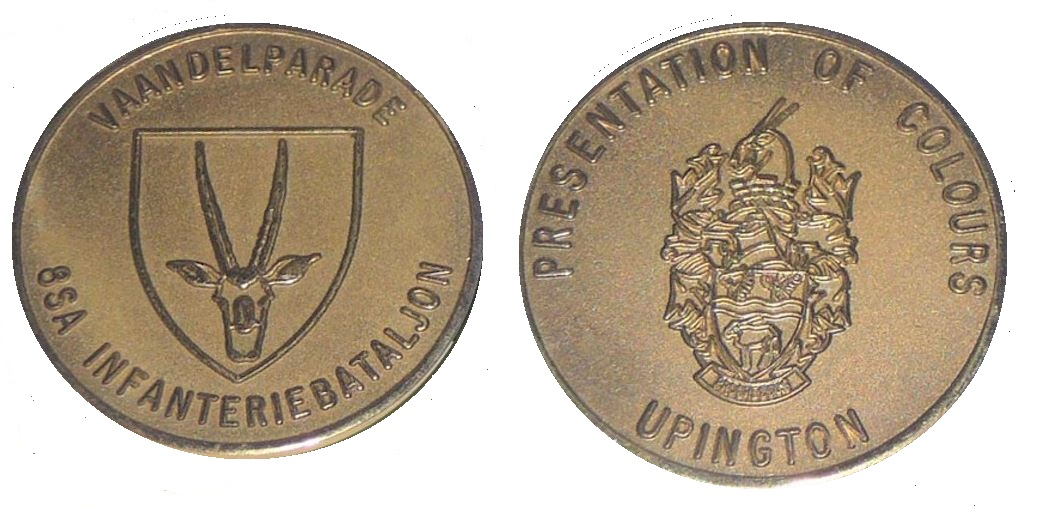
8 SAI Commemorative coin

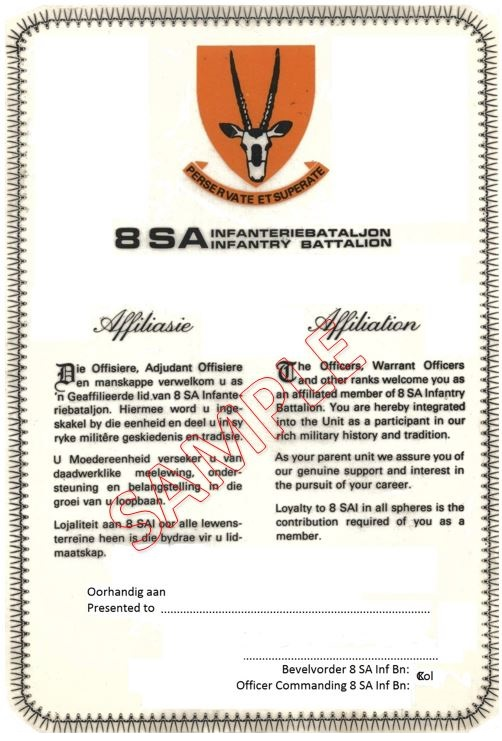
SADF 8 SAI affiliation certificate

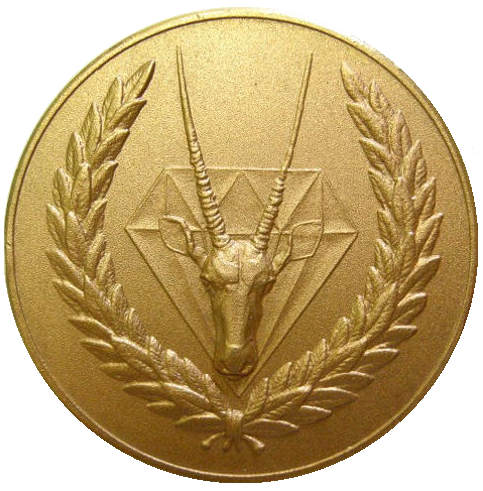
SADF 8 SAI challenge coin

== Insignia ==
=== Previous Dress Insignia ===
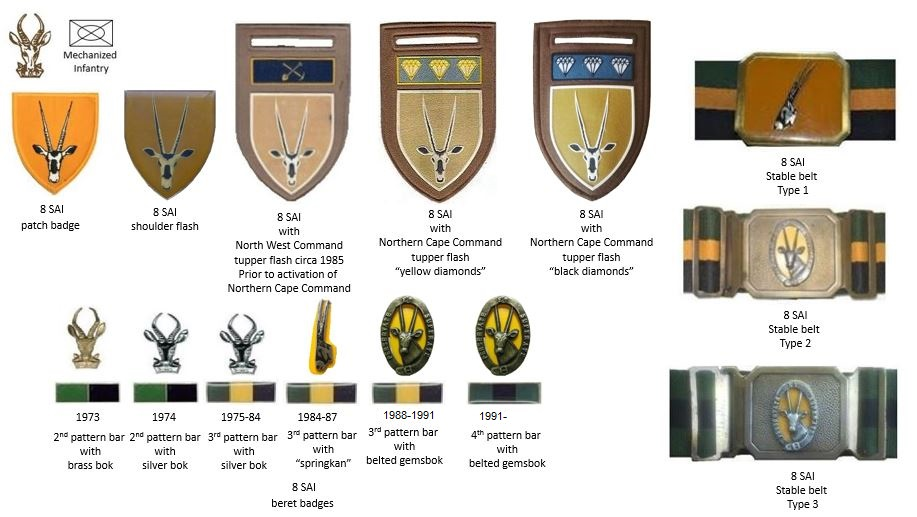
SADF era 8 SAI insignia

=== Current Dress Insignia ===
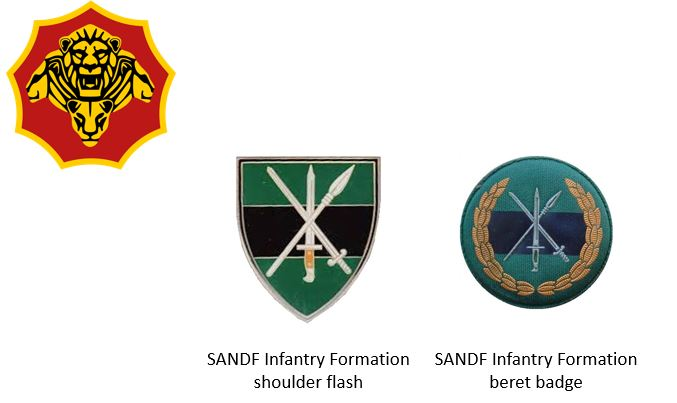
SANDF era Infantry Formation insignia

== Unit song ==
Ou Kalahari Wysie
Ver in die Noord-Kaapse duineveld waar gemsbokke nog baljaar,
Daar word 'n seun tot 'n vegter wat leer om sy land te bewaar
Selfs deur die snikhete somer en deur die winter kou,
Leer ons en werk ons en veg ons want ons land is ons hoogste trou.

Ver in die Noord-Kaapse duineveld weg van die stad se gewoel,
Daar leer die manne van 8 SAI te streef na die hoogste doel,
Onder die vry-bloue hemel en ongerepte natuur,
Toon ons ons ware karakter, wys ons ons krag en vuur.

== Battle honours ==
- Southwest/Angola 1979-1989
- Mulemba/Mulola
- Xangongo/Ongiva
- Mavinga II
- Mavinga III
- Cuito Cuanavale
- Calueque

Battle Honours
Awarded
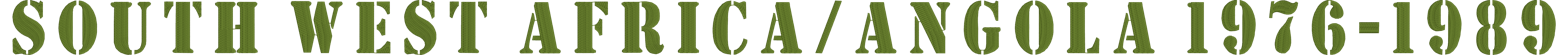
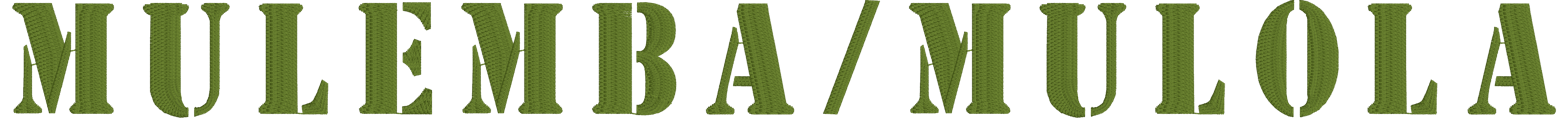
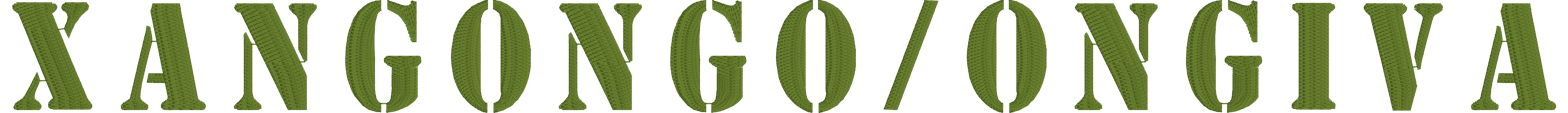
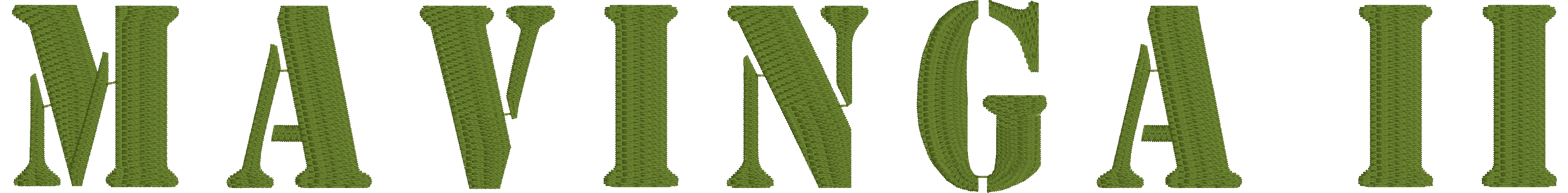
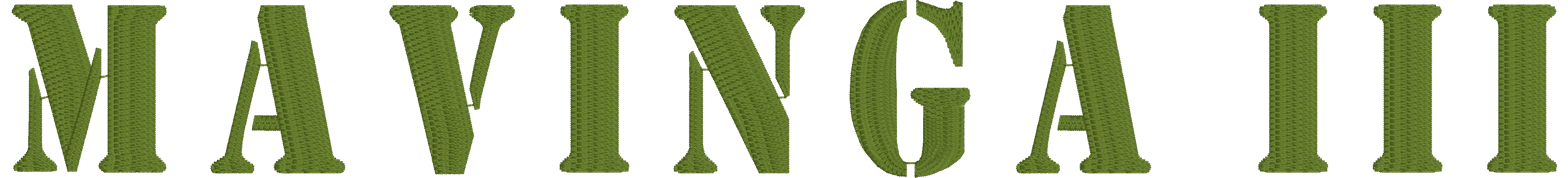
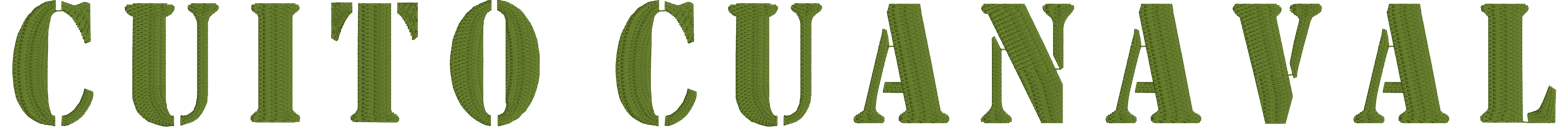
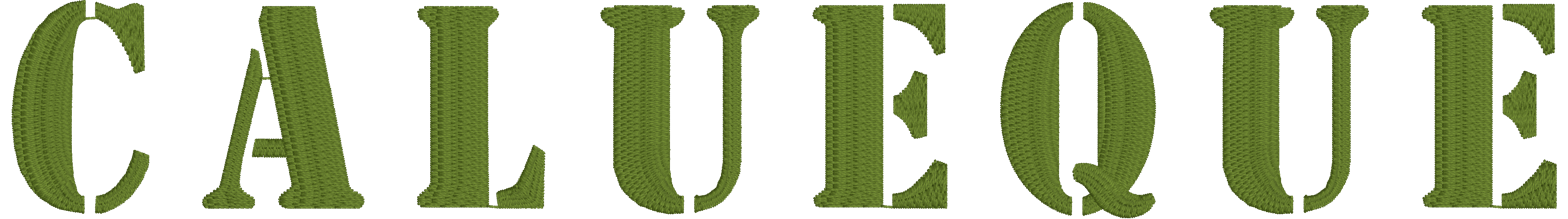

== Leadership ==
=== Training Battalion ===
Leadership
From	Honorary Colonel	To	Ribbon
	No known incumbents		
From	Officer Commanding	To	Ribbon
1973	Cmdt Tobie Hanekom	1975	
1976	Cmdt P.J. Bakkes	1977	
1977	Cmdt M.F. Botha	c. 1979	
1984	Cmdt Piet Müller	1986	
1987	Col Johan Jooste (Note: Previously OC 31 Battalion (SWATF))	1990	
1990 – 1991	Col JJ(Koos) Liebenberg	1992	
1992	Col Jan Malan	1994	
1995	Lt Col LJ Buys	1996	
1997	Lt Col Fredericks	1999	
c. 2000	Lt Col Johan Alberts	c. 2003	
c. 2003	Maj G. Madella	c. 2006	
c. 2006	Lt Col E. Visagie	c. 2008	
c. 2008	Lt Col M Dyakopu	c. 2013	
c. 2013	Lt Col N.A. Nthejane	c. 2014	
c. 2014	Lt Col M.F. Goaliso	c. 2014	
c. 2014	Lt Col I.G. Segopa	c. 2014	
c. 2017	Lt Col L.N. Mushwana	c. 2020	
c. 2020	Lt Col T.A.Joseph	c. 2025	
From	Regimental Sergeant Major	To	Ribbon
c. 1973	WO1 D.H. van Niekerk	c. 1975	
c. 1975	WO1 A.J. van Zyl	c. 1976	
c. 1976	WO1 J.L. Scherman	c. 1978	
c. 1978	WO1 J.J. Bronkhorst	c. 1982	
c. 1983	WO1 C.F. Swanepoel	c. 1986	
c. 1987	WO1 E.N. Palmer	c. 1992	
c. 1993	WO1 A.C. Barnard	c. 1995	
c. 1995	WO1 A.M. Erasmus	c. 1997	
c. 1997	WO1 J.C. Young	c. 2005	
c. 2006	WO1 D.D. Lewis	c. 2008	
c. 2008	WO1 M. A. Koto	c. 2013	
c. 2013	WO1 A.A.J. Kennedy	c. 2019	

=== Operational Battalion ===
Leadership
From	Officer Commanding	To	Ribbon
1989	Col Kobus van den Bergh	c. 1992	
1992	Cmdt G.J. Oberholzer	c. 1992	
1992	Cmdt J.J. Steyn	nd	
From	Regimental Sergeants Major	To	Ribbon
c. 1989	WO1 Wiesse	c. 1990	
c. 1990	WO1 H. Engelbrecht	nd	
