= Oupyakadi =

- Village
- Location in Angola
- Coordinates: 16°44′00″S 15°48′00″E
- Country: Angola
- Province: Cunene Province
- Elevation: 1,130 m (3,710 ft)
- Time zone: UTC+1 (WAT)
- Climate: Cwa

Oupyakadi was a Roman Catholic mission station in southern Angola, located ca. 50 km to the north of Ondjiva. It was located on the borderland between the tribes of Oukwanyama and Evale.

== History ==
Oupyakadi was established in 1903 to replace Matadiva. When the Catholic missionaries were transferring to this location, the Evale people attacked them and wounded one of them mortally.

The area was restless during those years, as the Portuguese fought a war with the Ombadja people, and in German South West Africa, the Herero War was being fought. Possibly for this reason the place was called Oupyakadi, ‘trouble’.
