= Lutheranism in Angola =

Lutheranism was first introduced to Angola in the late 1800s, when Finnish missionaries began working in northern Namibia and southern Angola. Following the Portuguese defeat of Mandume Ya Ndemufayo in 1917, the Lutheran church in Angola was repressed by the Roman Catholic Portuguese authorities. In 1956, Lutheranism was reestablished in Angola, and in 1991, the Evangelical Lutheran Church of Angola was organized as an independent church body. In 1997, a smaller group of conservative Lutheran missionaries helped to organize a second Angolan Lutheran church: the Confessional Lutheran Church in Angola.

== History ==
Missionaries from the Finnish Evangelical Lutheran Mission (FELM) first arrived in the Ondonga kingdom in northern Namibia in July 1870. Two decades later, German missionaries from the Rhenish Missionary Society began evangelizing among the Oukwanyama people in northern Namibia and southern Angola. The latter group established mission plants in Ondjiva, Omupanda, Namakunde, and Omatemba, but these missions were threatened during the reign of Mandume Ya Ndemufayo, leading many converts to flee south to Ondonga. Following Ndemufayo's defeat by the Portuguese, most of the Lutherans who remained in Angola moved to Namibia, while the rest either converted to Roman Catholicism or renounced Christianity entirely. Indigenous Lutheran missionaries from Namibia returned to Angola beginning in 1933, but they were largely driven out by the Roman Catholic Portuguese officials.

In 1956, the first permanent Lutheran congregation was established in Angola since the departure of the Rhenish missionaries in 1915. Seven years later, a second congregation was established. Over the next several decades, more congregations were established under the auspices of the Evangelical Lutheran Church in Namibia (ELCIN), almost all of them in the Cunene Province. These missions were aided financially by both the ELCIN and the FELM. In 1991, these congregations were organized as the Evangelical Lutheran Church of Angola.

== Evangelical Lutheran Church of Angola ==
The Evangelical Lutheran Church of Angola (Igreja Evangélica Luterana de Angola or IELA) is an Evangelical Lutheran church body in Angola. The IELA traces its roots back to the 1950s–'60s missionary efforts of the Evangelical Lutheran Church in Namibia and Finnish Evangelical Lutheran Mission. It was officially organized in 1991, registered with the Angolan government in 1996, and joined both the Lutheran World Federation and the Lutheran Communion in Southern Africa in 1997. As of 2003, it had 31 congregations (19 in the Cunene Province and 12 in other provinces), with approximately 25,000 baptized members. By 2009, the church had grown to 40,000 members, and as of 2016, it had 49,500 members. The church is mostly active in the Cunene Province, and its head office is located in Lubango. Its current president is Tomás Ndawanapo.

== Confessional Lutheran Church in Angola ==
The Confessional Lutheran Church in Angola (Igreja Luterana Confessional em Angola or ILCA) is a confessional Lutheran church body in Angola. The ILCA traces its roots to the late 1990s, when Pastor Jeremiah Mavungu and his son, Pastor Benjamin Nzuzi Mavungu, began missionary work in the city of Cabinda. In 2000, the Evangelical Lutheran Church of Brazil (IELB) and the Lutheran Church—Missouri Synod (LCMS) began providing theological training for the pastors of the ILCA. As of 2013, the church consisted of approximately 500 members and six pastors.
