= Shangalala =

- Village
- Location in Angola
- Coordinates: 16°48′45″S 14°54′35″E
- Country: Angola
- Province: Cunene Province
- Elevation: 1,130 m (3,710 ft)
- Time zone: UTC+1 (WAT)
- Climate: Cwa

Shangalala is a mission station of the Finnish Missionary Society on the Kunene River in Ombadja tribal area in southern Angola, less than 10 km south-west of Xangongo.

Shangalala was established ca. 1973. The mission has a church and a hospital.

The headquarters of the Evangelical Lutheran Church of Angola was formerly located in Shangalala and then moved to Lubango. The bishop of the church, Right Rev. Tomás Ndawanapo Nande is from the Shangalala area.
