= Matadiva =

- Village
- Location in Angola
- Coordinates: 16°50′00″S 15°41′00″E
- Country: Angola
- Province: Cunene Province
- Elevation: 1,130 m (3,710 ft)
- Time zone: UTC+1 (WAT)
- Climate: Cwa

Matadiva was a short-lived Roman Catholic mission station in southern Angola, located ca. 30 km to the north of Ondjiva. It was located in the northern extremity of the Oukwanyama tribal territory.

Matadiva was established in 1900 by father Génié, but the location was soon found to be less than optimal, and the mission station was moved in 1903 to Oupyakadi, some 20 km further in the north.
