= Operation Mebos =

- Part of the South African Border War
- Location: Angola Operation Mebos (Angola)
- Target: Various places
- Date: 31 July – 25 August 1982
- Outcome: South African Victory
- Casualties: 345 PLAN Soldiers Killed

Operation Mebos occurred during July and August 1982 with the objective of attacking SWAPO's People's Liberation Army of Namibia (PLAN) bases and new regional headquarters in Southern Angola by the South African Defence Force (SADF) based in South West Africa/Namibia.

The plan involved the use of South African Air Force helicopters flown from mobile helicopter administrative areas (HAA) with a SADF Tactical Headquarters deep in Angola and protected from possible People's Forces for the Liberation of Angola (FAPLA) attacks by 61 Mechanised Battalion Group. These helicopters would fly 32 Battalion and paratroopers from the HAA areas to SWAPO targets identified by reconnaissance teams deep in the Angolan bush and by signal and human intelligence.

== Background ==
Planning for Operation Mebos began when the SADF feared that PLAN and FAPLA would attempt to retake the Angolan towns of Xangongo and Ongiva. These towns had been captured by the SADF during Operation Protea and had been occupied ever since.

Ongiva contained a SADF tactical and logistical headquarters with an airfield to support ground and airborne operations to conduct counter-insurgency operations in Southern Angola.

The second part of the operation involved identifying the SWAPO bases and headquarters which appeared to be constantly on the move. The plan called for 61 Mechanised Battalion Group to protect the mobile Advance airfields from possible FAPLA and SWAPO attacks while the SAAF helicopters would transport 32 Battalion and 1 Parachute Battalion companies to attack SWAPO bases identified by reconnaissance teams. The operation began on 13 July 1982 and was wound down by 25 August 1982.

== Order of battle ==
=== South African Forces ===
- Two companies of 32 Battalion
- One company of 1 Parachute Battalion
- 61 Mechanised Battalion Group
- Various SAAF squadrons of combat aircraft and helicopters

=== SWAPO forces ===
- Various units based around Evale, Ionde, Mupa and other targets
- Alpha Battalion
- Bravo Battalion

=== Angolan forces ===
- 11th FAPLA Brigade based at Cuvelai and Techamutete

== Battle ==
On 13 July, one company of 61 Mechanised Battalion Group moved from Ongiva up to Xangongo. By 18 July a further two companies and the headquarters of 61 Mech moved into Xangongo where combat readiness training was begun, practising for the forthcoming operation.

SAAF Mirages attacked FAPLA air defences at Cahama around 21 July. On 22 July, SADF reconnaissance units had discovered a possible SWAPO headquarters near Mupa. It was attacked firstly by Alouette gunships followed by an airdrop by helicopter of ground troops which killed around 18 PLAN soldiers but the base was found to have been evacuated. 61 Mech's mortar and gun batteries were moved up to Xangongo on 24 July.

At last 61 Mech had completed its combat readiness training around Xangongo and departed there on 27 July heading in the direction of Mongua hoping to confuse FAPLA and PLAN intelligence as to it final destination before disappearing off into the Angolan bush. Finally after three days of pushing through the bush, 61 Mech met up with two companies of 32 Battalion by 30 July, 25 km east of Mupa. There they found what they thought was a suitable site for a HAA position. On the same day, 32 Battalion reconnaissance units had discovered a PLAN base close to the Calonga River, 21 km on the western side of the Cuvelai/Techamatette road and about 31 km south-west of Techamutete. A plan was developed for a parachute drop at first light on 31 July, north of the target and a helicopter drop of 32 Battalion at three other points with protection provided by Alouette gunships.

31 July did not start well as the vicinity of the HAA was attacked by FAPLA artillery. The FAPLA unit expended its artillery shells in the attack and the HAA had to be moved. The tactical headquarters was moved up to the new HAA from Ongiva. At the same time the 32 Battalion reconnaissance units could not find a suitable drop zone and also noticed the base was being evacuated. The airdrop was cancelled and the paratroopers were called back to their base in SWA/Namibia. The plan was modified and the paratroopers were collected and joined 32 Battalion for a very delayed helicopter drop. By the time the SADF arrived at the target all that could be found were PLAN stragglers. The SAAF insistence that their helicopters not remain at the HAA sites overnight would continue to negatively influence the operation in the future due to the distance between the HAA and SAAF bases in SWA/Namibia.

1 August begun with the HAA being moved further north and a few days earlier aerial intelligence had discovered a base close by. The Tactical headquarters at the HAA began planning another mission consisting of an air attack by Mirage's followed by a helicopter troop assault with air protection by Alouette gunships. The attack took place on 2 August around midday with an attack by Mirages followed by an Alouette gunship who were attacked by 14.5 mm AA guns and RPG-7s. 32 Battalion was the first wave of ground troops dropped in by Puma helicopters followed by a second wave of paratroopers. The battle ended after some fierce fighting. One soldier of 32 Battalion had been killed and two were wounded. As for the PLAN soldiers, 144 died during the battle with weapons and ammunition captured.

3 August began with the receipt of signal intelligence concerning FAPLA proposing to move a twenty-two vehicle logistics convoy from Techamutete to Cuvelai. This was to resupply the 11th Brigade with artillery shells it had expended on 31 July. A quickly prepared plan was developed with an air-drop by helicopter of a 61 Mech ambush platoon along the road. The ambush began around 05h30 on 4 August, stopping the convoy and destroying some of the vehicles. Alouette gunships followed up and by 08h00 the ambush was over with twenty vehicles destroyed and two captured. The rest of 61 Mech reached the ambush platoon later that day. The following days to 9 August were quiet with the 61 Mech remaining close to the Techamutete/Cuvelai road.

By 9 August a PLAN base was discovered north of the Mui River about 15 km to the west of the Cuvelai/Techamutete road by members of the 32 Battalion reconnaissance units. 32 Battalion and 1 Parachute troops were airlifted by Puma's accompanied by Alouette gunships around midday to the base. During a second air-drop, the helicopters were ambushed en route to the base by a hidden PLAN anti-aircraft teams and resulted in one Puma helicopter being shot down killing the three airmen and twelve paratroopers. Alouettes gunships attacked the crash site dispersing the PLAN soldiers around the downed helicopter and 61 Mech elements move up to site to retrieve the bodies and the helicopter. An armoured unit based at Xangongo at the time was held in readiness if the need should arise. The helicopter wreck itself was removed the following day. In total, 106 PLAN soldiers were killed at the base that was attacked.

On 9 August a Russian T34/85 Tank was being recovered from Xangongo by 10 Armoured Car Squadron as part of a broader deception strategy. The recovery team was waiting to travel back to Ongiva when a radio signal came in placing them on standby as a result of the Puma that had been shot down at the Mui River. After 61 Mech responded the 10 Armoured Car team was stood down and proceeded with their mission.

Another PLAN base was discovered on 10 August by the 32 Battalion reconnaissance units about 30 km north of Cuvelai. Again it was attacked by Mirages and Alouette gunships. Around 11:00 the infantry companies of 32 Battalion and 1 Parachute Battalion were air-dropped into the contact area guided by the gunships and attacked the base. The attack killed 116 PLAN soldiers with no losses by the SADF forces.

== Aftermath ==
PLAN casualties for this operation were calculated at 345 killed. The SADF forces had captured or destroyed vast amounts of ammunition and stores and gathered vital intelligence data. The operation was announced to the South African public by the SADF Headquarters on 15 August. It was believed this operation would not have been revealed, had it not been for the high casualty figure of 29 SADF soldiers who had died during the fighting. This could not be hidden from the South African public.
