= Humbe =

- commune and town
- Location in Angola
- Coordinates: 16°41′05″S 14°54′08″E
- Country: Angola
- Province: Cunene
- Municipality: Ombadja
- Elevation: 1,110 m (3,640 ft)
- Time zone: UTC+1 (WAT)
- Climate: BSh

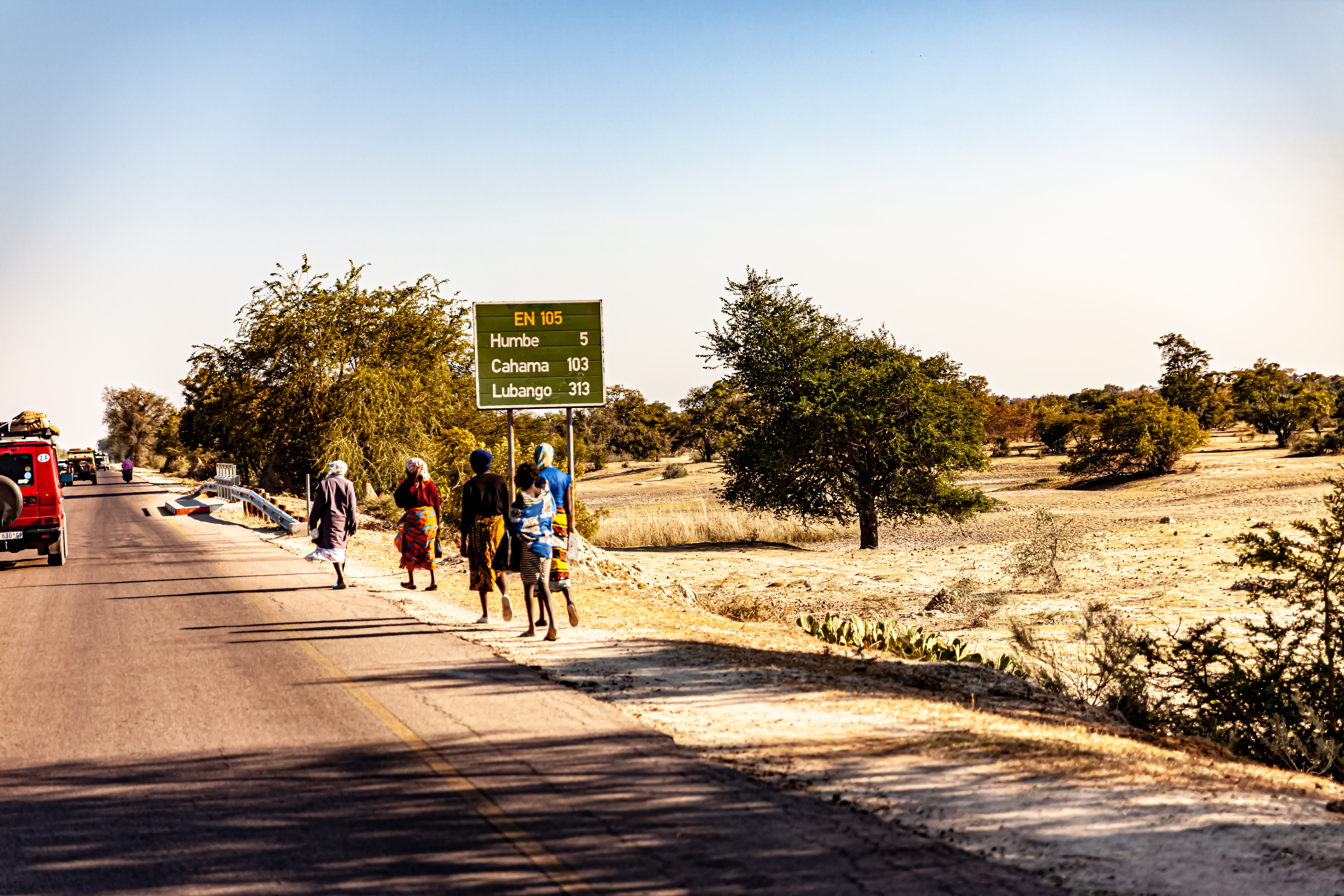
Road to Humbe (EN-105)

Humbe is a town and commune in the municipality of Ombadja, province of Cunene, Angola.

It also used to be the location of a Roman Catholic mission station in southern Angola, located approx. 10 km northeast of Xangongo, in the tribal area of the Ombadja tribe of the Ovambos. It was located on a tributary of the Kunene River, flowing into this river from the north.

Humbe was established in ca. 1882, after the Catholics had made a failed attempt to establish themselves near the Finnish mission station of Olukonda in Ondonga, Ovamboland, in 1879, and then in Omaruru, Hereroland, further south in South West Africa in 1882.

The attempts of the Portuguese to subjugate the Ovambos of Ombadja and Oukwanyama were initially unsuccessful, and 1904 they suffered a massive defeat at the Cunene river. In response, the Portuguese established Forte Roçadas in 1906 in what is now Xangongo, not far from Humbe.

== Sources ==
- Peltola, Matti (1958). Sata vuotta suomalaista lähetystyötä 1859–1959. II: Suomen Lähetysseuran Afrikan työn historia [‘One Hundred Years of Finnish Missionary Work 1859–1959. II: The History of FMS’s Missionary Work in Africa’]. Helsinki: The Finnish Missionary Society.
