= Prostitution in Angola =

Prostitution in Angola is illegal and prevalent since the 1990s. Prostitution increased further at the end of the civil war in 2001. Prohibition is not consistently enforced. Many women engage in prostitution due to poverty. It was estimated in 2013 that there were about 33,000 sex workers in the country. Many Namibian women enter the country illegally, often via the border municipality of Curoca, and travel to towns such as Ondjiva, Lubango and Luanda to work as prostitutes.

Prostitution is widespread in the oil-rich Cabinda Province, where many American and other foreign nationals work. Women from the Democratic Republic of the Congo and the Republic of the Congo cross the porous border to earn money in the enclave as prostitutes. Some of the police in the area are corrupt and deport the women if they do not pay the bribes required. The most famous bar/brothel in the enclave is Berlita in Cabinda city's Comandante Jika neighbourhood. It is named after its late owner, a sex worker. Prostitution is also common in the diamond mining areas.

The Ministry of Family and Women Promotion (MINFAMU) maintains a women's shelter in the capital, Luanda, that is open to former prostitutes.

Child prostitution is a problem in the country.

== 2010 Africa Cup of Nations ==
Angola hosted the 2010 Africa Cup of Nations. There were fears that the increased demand for prostitutes from the visiting fans would lead to a surge in human trafficking. An anti-trafficking law was passed, and a soccer-based public awareness campaign was run.

The spread of STIs and HIV were a concern. The organising committee, LOC, initially tried to have all the prostitutes removed from the cities hosting games, but this did not prove to be practical. In conjunction with the Health Commission in Angola, they distributed 5 million free condoms to bars, hotels and other strategic locations.

== HIV ==
Angola has a large HIV/AIDS infected population. However, it has one of the lowest prevalence rates in the Southern Africa zone. Sex workers are a high risk group. UNAIDS reported that there was a 4.7% prevalence amongst sex workers in 2016. (The figure amongst the general adult population was 1.9%)

The reluctance to use condoms is a contributing factor. In 2016, UNAIDS reported 82.6% condom usage amongst sex workers. Some sex workers charge double for sex without a condom. Another factor is that the many prostitutes that are in the country illegally have no access to health services.

== Sex trafficking ==
Human traffickers exploit domestic and foreign victims in Angola, and traffickers exploit victims from Angola abroad. Angolan girls as young as 13 years old are victims of sex trafficking. The provinces of Luanda, Benguela, and the border provinces of Cunene, Lunda Norte, Namibe, Uige, and Zaire are the most high-threat areas for trafficking activities. Traffickers exploit Angolan women and children in sex trafficking in South Africa, Namibia, and European countries, including the Netherlands and Portugal.

Women from Brazil, Cuba, Democratic Republic of the Congo, Namibia, and Vietnam engaged in prostitution in Angola may be victims of sex trafficking. Undocumented Congolese migrants, including children, enter Angola for work in diamond-mining districts, where traffickers exploit some in sex trafficking in mining camps. Trafficking networks recruit and transport Congolese girls as young as 12 years old from Kasai Occidental in the Congo to Angola for sex trafficking.

The United States Department of State Office to Monitor and Combat Trafficking in Persons ranks Angola as a "Tier 2 Watch List" country.
