= Omatemba =

- Village
- Location in Angola
- Coordinates: 17°18′31″S 15°45′00″E
- Country: Angola
- Province: Cunene Province
- Elevation: 1,110 m (3,640 ft)
- Time zone: UTC+1 (WAT)
- Climate: Cwa

Omatemba was a mission station of the Rhenish Mission Society in Oukwanyama in southern Angola, located 25 km to the south of Ondjiva.

== History ==
Omatemba was founded in 1907 by the German missionary Heinrich Welsch less than 10 km west of Namakunde mission station, next to the home of Nekoto, the aunt of King Nande of Oukwanyama. At the time it was thought that the area was part of German South West Africa.

It turned out later that Omatemba was located on disputed territory, 10 km wide north to south, which in the end ended up with the Portuguese. In 1916 Welsch was at first allowed to stay in Omatemba, but in August of that year he was ordered to leave. It remained unclear whether the order had been given by the British or the Portuguese.

At first Omatemba was used by the Portuguese authorities, then it was a shop, and finally it was left to ruins.
