= Ombadja =

- Municipality
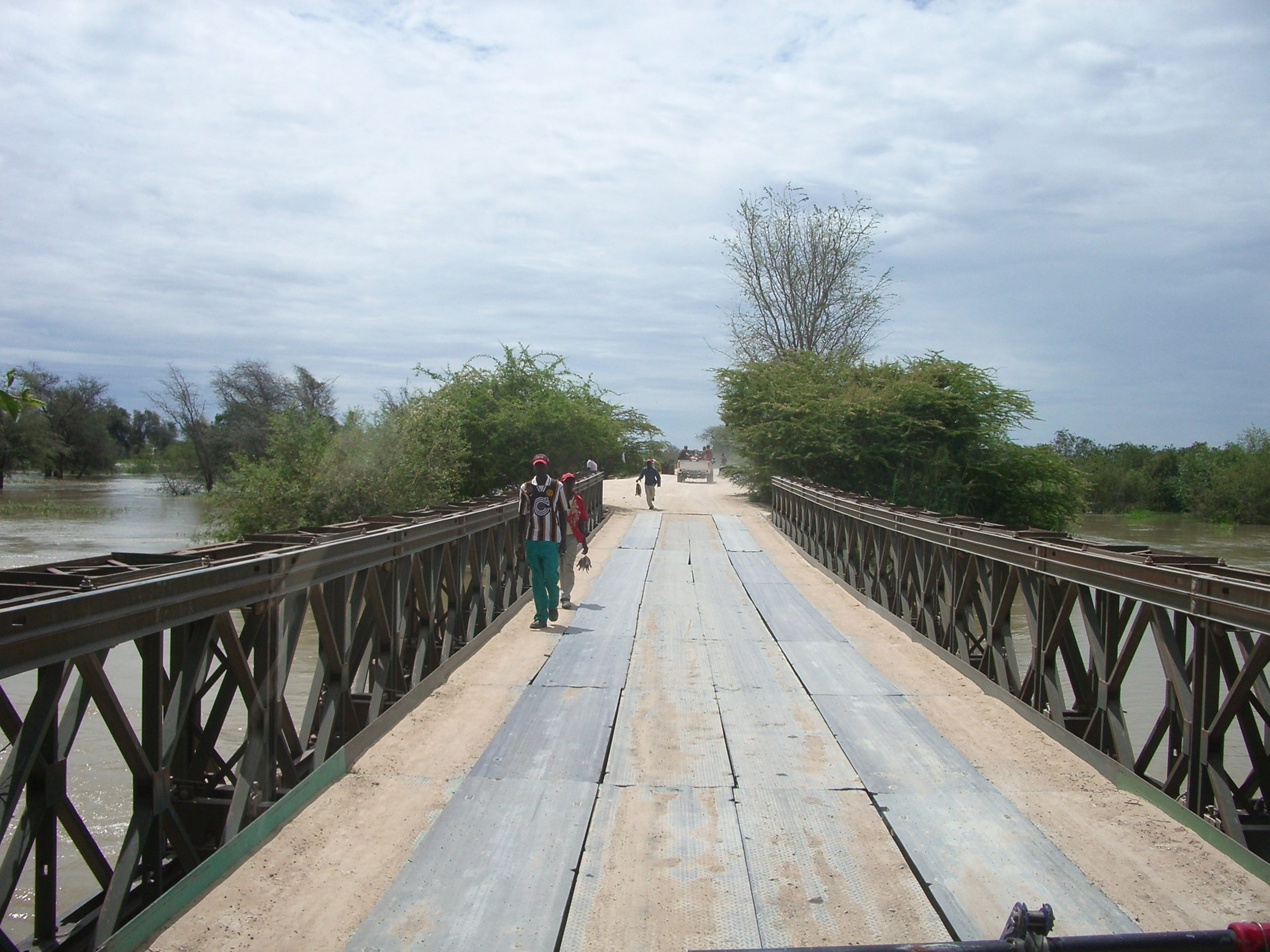
- Bridge over the Cunene River in Xangango

- Location in Angola
- Coordinates: 16°47′28″S 14°56′6″E
- Country: Angola
- Province: Cunene

Area
  - Total: 12,264 km^{2} (4,735 sq mi)

Population (2014 Census)
  - Total: 304,964
  - Density: 24.867/km^{2} (64.404/sq mi)
- Time zone: UTC+1 (WAT)

Ombadja (known as Santa Clara until 1975) is a municipality in Cunene Province, Angola. Its seat is the village of Xangongo (known in colonial times as Roçadas). It occupies 12,264 square kilometers and has about 304,964 inhabitants as of the 2014 Angolan census. It is bordered to the north by the municipality of Matala, in the east by the municipalities of Cuvelai, Namacunde, and Cuanhama, and to the west by the municipalities of Curoca and Cahama. It contains the communes of Xangongo, Ombala-Yo-Mungo, Naulila, Humbe and Mucope.
