= Operation Excite/Hilti =

- Part of the South African Border War
- Location: Angola Operation Excite/Hilti (Angola)
- Objective: Draw the Cubans out of Techipa and ambush them, preventing an advance to Calueque and the SWA/Namibian border.
- Date: May – June 1988

Operation Excite/Hilti (aka Operation Hilti and Operation Prone) was a set of military operations by the South African Defence Force (SADF) during the Angolan Civil War and South African Border War.

== Background ==
With a stalemate around Cuito Cuanavale in the south-eastern Angola, the Cuban interest moved to the far south-west. Fidel Castro developed a strategy to increase Cuban influence in the region and develop plans to push the Cuban forces as far as the South-West African/Namibian border.

On 11 March, the Cuban 40 Tank Brigade was moved as far as Tchibemba and with the goal of reinforcing the towns at Cahama, Xangongo, Mupa and Cuvelai that were currently garrisoned by the People's Armed Forces for the Liberation of Angola (FAPLA) and SWAPO soldiers. At the same time there was a need to move aircraft, radar and air defences further south and this meant the construction and extensions of the existing airfields. This occurred at Cahama and Xangongo with the construction being completed by early to late June. These extensions and the expansion of radar and air defences brought about the end of SAAF air superiority in this region allowing Cuban aircraft to attack bases in SWA/Namibia if required.

This Cuban plan would clash with the interests of South Africa in the region. The South Africans had free rein in this region of Angola for a number of years and had been in control of the Calueque hydroelectric and irrigation scheme since 1975 that supplied energy and water to South-West Africa/Namibia.

== Order of battle ==
=== South African and South West Africa Territorial Forces ===
51 Battalion - Commandant Leon Lambrechts

- one company - 1 SWA Specialised Unit
- one company - 911 Battalion
- one company - 101 Battalion

61 Mechanised Infantry Battalion Group - Commandant Mike Muller

- two Ratel-20 mechanized companies
- one Armoured Car squadron
- one Ratel-90 anti-tank platoon
- one Olifant tank squadron
- one Ratel ZT3 troop
- one company - 1 Parachute Battalion

32 Battalion - Commandant Jan Hougard

- three companies - 32 Battalion
- one troop 20mm AA
- one company - 701 Battalion
- one company - 102 Battalion
- one company - 210 Battalion
- combat element - Sector 20
- three intelligence teams
- three 81-mm mortar sections - 32 Battalion
- two reconnaissance teams - 32 Battalion
- Eland armoured car squadron - Sector 20
- one troop G-1 88-mm artillery

10 Artillery Brigade - Commandant George Swanepoel

- one G-5 battery - S Battery
- one G-2 battery - K Battery
- one MRL troop
- one 120-mm mortar battery
- one meteorological section
- one 20-mm AA Ystervark troop

== Battles ==
With the Cuban movements southwards and continuing SADF/South West African Territorial Force operations against SWAPO in same area, both forces would soon come into contact with each other.

=== Skirmishes begin ===
On 18 April, a SWATF unit, 101 Battalion, chasing a SWAPO unit was ambushed by Cuban elements from Xangongo near Chipeque. The battle ended with the South Africans losing two men and eleven wounded. Thereafter the Cubans continued patrolling southwards from Xangongo towards the SADF garrison at Calueque.

=== Aerial attack ===
On 2 May, SAAF Mirages attacked FAPLA positions south of Techipa. The Cubans retaliated fearing a South African advance and planned another ambush.

=== Ongoing tripartite talks ===
During the first round tripartite talks in London on the 3 May, behind the scene talks between the military contingents of Cuba and South Africa was tense. The Cubans threatened to invade SWA/Namibia if the South Africans did not agree to the Cuban proposals while the South African indicated if they tried, it would be Cuba's darkest day. The talks ended the following day.

=== Cuban ambush ===
The ambush site was in position by 4 May less than 2 km south of Donguena. An SADF unit, 101 Battalion, with twenty Casspirs and two trucks had been sent forward to occupy Donguena. They ran into an ambush with Cubans destroying or damaging four Casspirs. The South Africans withdrew at dusk having lost seven men and one captured, Sergeant Johan Papenfus and failed to retrieve the fourth Casspir and its equipment. The Cubans were said to have lost forty five soldiers.

Later that evening, a further three companies from 201 and 101 Battalions were sent forward to capture Donguena, but with Cuban tank positions south of the town, withdrew. The Cuban later withdrew the same evening.

=== Planning ===
On 12 May, 32 Battalion's commander was called to a meeting in Oshakati to discuss a plan for the unit to attack SWAPO units at Techipa. The commander persuaded the planners to reconnoitrer the area first before attacking.

On 16 May, two reconnaissance units were airlifted to an area south of Techipa and while the second landed close to Xangongo but on the western side of the Cunene River. The first team was unable to get close to Techipa while the second team found tank tracks on all roads showing extensive patrolling of the area. The first team was sent back in from the north of Techipa by vehicle, finding extensive trench systems around the town reminiscent of the same layered system around Cuito with vehicles, generators and radar systems and outposts at further distances south of the town.

A decision was then made to establish a new task force but it would only be in operation by early June, with a specific aim of protecting the water scheme at Calueque. In the meantime, three companies of 32 Battalion would hold the line until the task force was operational and would continue to patrol and reconnoitre the area south of Techipa.

An ambush by 32 Battalion was planned for 22 May. The plan called for a mortar attack on an outpost south of Techipa which would draw out the Cubans who would be then ambushed. Members of a 32 Battalion company ambushed a Cuban de-mining team before the mortaring began and then found themselves being attacked by four BRDM-2 armoured personnel carriers and from two other hidden outposts. Fleeing back to the mortar position under covering mortar fire, the Cubans finally caught up and attacked with the BRDM's resulting in the abandonment of three damaged Unimogs. The 32 Battalion company retreated again as BM-21s started shelling. The Cubans eventually gave up the chase and the company was able to return to the mortar position in search of the missing vehicles but these had been removed by the Cubans. The remaining missing 32 Battalion members turned up at Ruacana and Calueque the following day.

Following the bungled ambush of the 22 May, the Cubans analysed the intelligence gathered from the captured SADF vehicles. Cuban intelligence concluded that the South African were planning a major attack on Techipa which was not the case. June was spent reinforcing the defences around Techipa with consisted of minefields, bunkers and anti-tank barriers which had been employed successfully to slow down the SADF and UNITA forces around Cuito Cuanavale during Operation Packer. There was also a build-up of Cuban forces around the town and aggressive patrolling by SWAPO and FAPLA forces to establish the positions of the South African forces. At the same time Castro planned an operation consisting of two parts. :

- The first, a two pronged attack, one from Xangongo to capture Cuamato,
- then a three column advance from Techipa to capture Calueque joined later by the forces that had captured Cuamato. * The second part of the plan was an air attack on Ruacana if Techipa was attacked by the SAAF. Castro also notified the Angolans and Soviets of his plan.

=== SADF mobilisation ===
After a visit to SWA/Namibia, General Jannie Geldenhuys spoke to journalists on 8 June, announcing the Cubans build-up and their advance to the border region around Ruacana and the call-up of SADF conventional forces made up of citizen reserves.

The call-up was said to be around 140,000 men, and it was hoped the announcement would send a message to the Cubans to end their advance to the SWA/Namibian border.

By 13 June, the new SADF Task Force planned in May, was now in operation under the command of Colonel Mucho Delport, with SADF forces in place east of the Cunene River, south of Xangongo, and around Cuamato and Calueque. Other SADF forces were positioned west of the Cunene River, with placements around and to the north-west of Calueque and Ruacana. The task force's headquarters was at Ruacana. On 18 June, G-2 and G-5 batteries were in position and ready for use by the task force. These were used to shell the Cuban positions.

=== Contact ===
On 22 June, a company from 32 Battalion clashed with a Cuban unit with tanks and infantry. They were able to break off contact with the Cubans after assistance from SADF artillery.

On the 23 June, reconnaissance units and members of 32 Battalion spotted three Cuban columns moving southwards from Techipa towards Calueque, with this stop-start advance continuing until the 26 June. Meanwhile, the Cubans and FAPLA forces advanced from Xangongo on 24 June, the first prong of their plan and attacked the SADF units at Cuamato.

201 Battalion with additional elements of Ratels and mortars stopped the advanced and occupation of the town and the Cubans retreated back to Xangongo. The South African lost a few vehicles and remained in the town.

At the same time the Cubans, Angolans and South Africans met in Cairo on 24 June for a second round of tripartite talks. The two-day meeting was led by the Americans with a Soviet delegation in attendance. The meeting was fiery with the Soviets pulling the Cuban delegation back into line and all that was agreed was that the concept of linkage, a South African pull-out of Angola followed by the Cubans, was the only option for a future agreement.

By the 26 June, a 32 Battalion company was moved into position to provide early warning of the Cuban tanks and columns advancing from Techipa while 61 Mechanised Battalion was brought in behind them to intercept when required. Using their MRL's and artillery they hindered and slowed the Cuban advance. Four Ratel ZT3 anti-tank missile units had also arrived at 61 Mechanised Battalion positions. That evening of the 26 June, SADF reconnaissance had discovered SA-6 launchers around Techipa. Using a ruse of releasing meteorological balloons with aluminium strips attached to them, the Cubans fired their SA-6's narrowing down their location for the SADF reconnaissance units, and the South Africans counterattacked with G-5 artillery destroying them and after four hours other Cuban artillery.

On the morning of the 27 June, the Cuban columns began to move again. Elements of 32 Battalion that were monitoring the column were unable to make contact with 61 Mechanised Battalion to warn them about the advancing Cubans. 61 Mechanised Battalion and their tanks begun moving at the same time to find a better position than the night lager and when advancing over a low ridge, ran into a forward Cuban units ambush. The leading Ratel was hit by a RPG and during the battle, four further Ratels were damaged losing one soldier and a further three wounded. 61 Mechanised called in artillery fire as Cuban reinforcements arrived to support the ambush unit. During the heavy fighting that followed the battalion destroyed a tank, a BTR-60, many trucks and inflicted heavy casualties on the Cuban infantry forcing them to withdraw. During the battle, 32 Battalion eventually made contact with 61 Mechanised, informing then that Cuban tanks were on their way. 61 Mechanised released their tanks and sent them to intercept the Cuban tanks. The SADF tanks made contact and after a half-hour had stopped the advance destroying another T-55 tank, trucks and a BTR-60. The Cubans were forced to withdraw again. Spotting the advance of two Cuban columns Commandant Mike Muller withdrew his forces southwards towards Calueque attacking one column and then the other with G-5 artillery. Both columns were halted.

=== Aerial attack of Calueque Dam ===
Around 1.07 pm, twelve Cuban MiG-23s based at Lubango and Cahama, flew at tree height to Ruacana, were spotted by SADF units but were unable to signal an air attack fast enough as the planes turned and headed to attack the hydroelectric dam at Calueque. Two bombed the bridge over the Cunene river and destroyed it, damaged the sluice gates while another two bombed the power plant and engine rooms. A fifth plane bombed the water irrigation pipeline to Ovambo, destroying it. One of those bombs from the fifth plane exploded between a Buffel and Eland 90 killing eleven SADF soldiers on ammunition escort duty. Two Cuban planes were hit by 20 mm AA guns and one crashed on its way back to its base in Angola.

=== Disengagement by both parties ===
The South African soldiers retreated back towards the SWA/Namibian border, crossing in the late afternoon. The elements of Alpha Company, 701 Bn(SWATF), were the last SA troops to cross from the Northern side of the Cunene to the Southern side, on June 30 and crossed the border back into SWA the same day. As described above, the air attack part of the Cuban operation went ahead but their ground forces retreated back to Techipa after the clash.

== Aftermath ==
Fearing a revenge attack by the SADF, the Cubans implemented plans that included possible attacks on SWA/Namibia itself. These plans were scrapped when no retaliation occurred from the South Africans. What followed the hostilities at Calueque was an undeclared ceasefire. The South African public were shocked by the deaths at Calueque and the government ordered a scaling back of operations.

=== Effect on the south eastern front ===
Battle Group 20 whom with UNITA, guarding the minefields east of the Cuito River across from Cuito Cuanavale, were ordered to withdraw personnel and equipment so as not to take casualties and prevent any further SADF personnel becoming a prisoner of war. UNITA were informed, with some regarding this withdrawal as an act of betrayal.

Orders were to ensure no Cubans advance any further than where they were currently positioned.

=== Return to the negotiation table ===
By 13 July, the Cubans and South Africans were back at the negotiation table in New York City. The eventual successful negotiations would lead to the end of Operation Displace.
