= Calonga (disambiguation) =

Calonga is a town and commune in Cunene, Angola.

It may also refer to:

- Lorenzo Calonga (1929–2003), Paraguayan footballer
- Lucio Calonga (1939–2007), Paraguayan footballer

== See also ==
- Calonge (disambiguation)
