= Omupanda =

- Village
- Location in Angola
- Coordinates: 17°04′S 15°44′E
- Country: Angola
- Province: Cunene Province
- Elevation: 1,120 m (3,670 ft)
- Time zone: UTC+1 (WAT)
- Climate: Cwa

Omupanda was a mission station of the Rhenish Mission Society in Oukwanyama in southern Angola, located 10 km to the south-east of Ondjiva.

== History ==
Omupanda was founded in 1892 by German missionary August Wulfhorst. At the time, it was thought that the area was part of German South West Africa.

Just as the first building was completed, it burned down and had to be rebuilt.

In 1900, the German missionary Hermann Tönjes came to Omupanda, together with his newly wed wife Anna (née Rautanen), daughter of the Finnish missionary Martti Rautanen.

The Germans had to leave Angola in 1916 as a result of World War I, and thus Omupanda was left empty. In 1928, the mission was transferred to the Catholic Church, and it remains Catholic to this day.
