= Battle of the Cunene =

- Part of the Campaigns of Pacification and Occupation
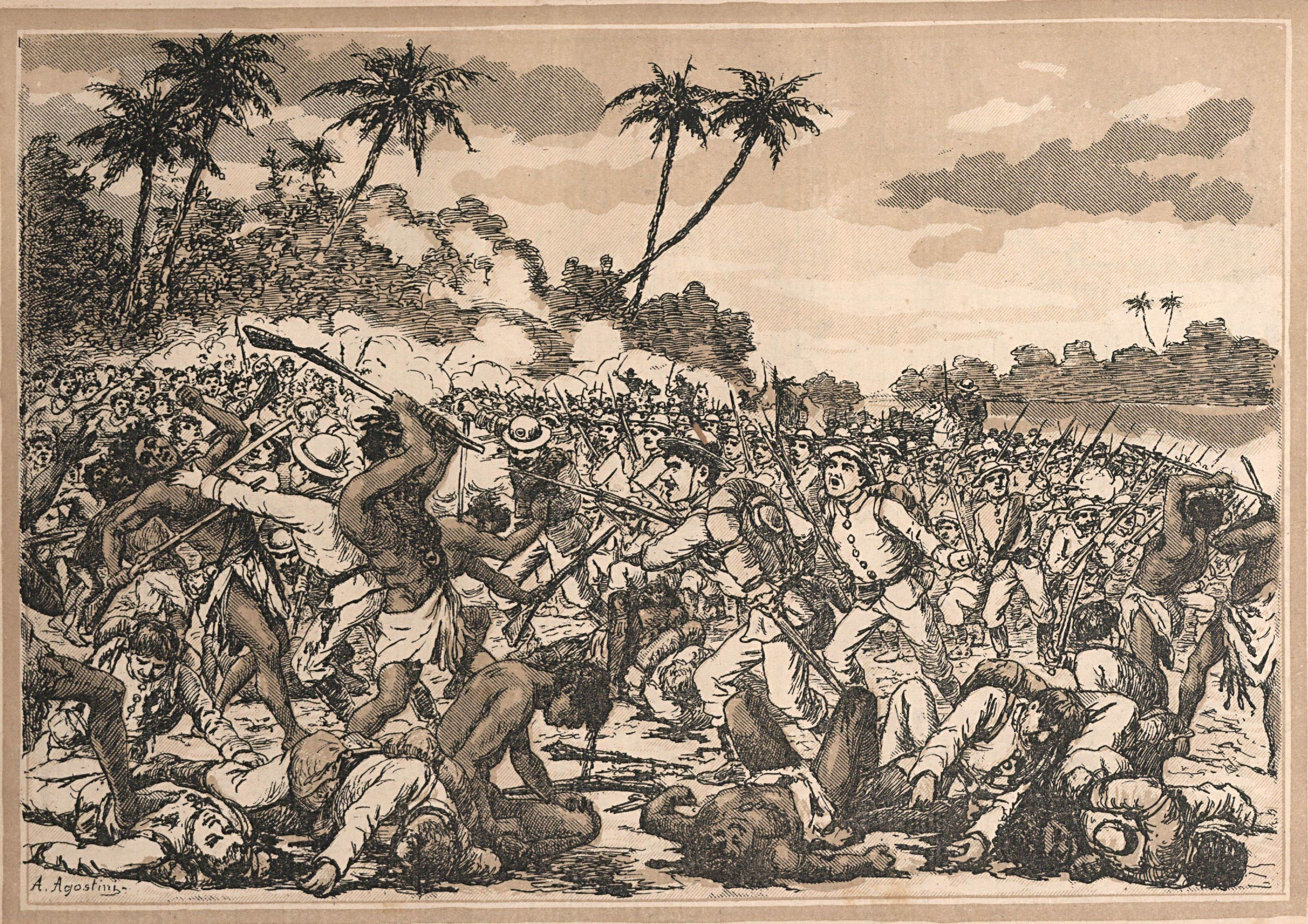
- A depiction from Angelo Agostini, O Malho (1904)
Date	25 September 1904
Location	Vau de Pembe, near the Cunene River (modern-day Ombadja, Cunene Province, Angola) 16.8°S 14.9°E
Result	Ovambo victory

Belligerents
Ovambo warriors	Kingdom of Portugal

Commanders and leaders
Tchetekelo	(Kingdom of Portugal) Luís de Almeida

Strength
Unknown	~500

Casualties and losses
Unknown	~300

The Battle of the Cunene took place between Portuguese colonial forces and Ovambo warriors from Oukwanyama and Cuamato in modern-day Angola on 25 September 1904.

After having subdued the Nkhumbi people, Portuguese troops advanced from Huila southward into territories which were just claimed by Portugal but not yet under control. At Cunene River they were confronted with the resistance of two Ovambo peoples, the Cuamato/Kwamato and Cuanhama/Kwanyama, led by their king Tchetekelo. When an advanced unit composed of 500 Portuguese soldiers and Humbi auxiliaries under captain Luís Pinto de Almeida crossed the river, about 300 men were massacred in an ambush.

The Portuguese defeat was followed by a punitive expedition in 1905 and 1907, but not before 1916 Southern Angola was "pacified".

== Sources ==
- Chisholm, Hugh, ed. (1911). "Angola" . Encyclopædia Britannica. Vol. 2 (11th ed.). Cambridge University Press. p. 40.
- António Aniceto Monteiro: The Conquest of Southern Angola (The Massacre, 25 September 1904)
- José Bento Duarte: Desastre do Vau do Pembe (Angola) – 25 de Setembro de 1904
