= Cubati, Angola =

Coordinates: 15°20′S 16°51′E

Cubati
- Commune
- Location in Angola
- Country: Angola
- Province: Cunene
- Time zone: UTC+1 (WAT)
- Climate: Aw

Cubati (official name: Cuvati) is a town and commune of Angola, located in the province of Cunene.

== See also ==
- Communes of Angola
