= Calonge (disambiguation) =

Calonge is a municipality in the comarca of the Baix Empordà in Catalonia, Spain.

It may also refer to:

- Calonge de Segarra, a municipality in Catalonia, Spain
- Sant Antoni de Calonge, a town in Catalonia, Spain
- Andrés Calonge (born 1945), Argentine sprinter
- Jesús Muñoz Calonge (born 1976), Spanish footballer

== See also ==
- Calonga (disambiguation)
- Calonges, a commune in the Lot-et-Garonne department in south-western France
