= 10 Armoured Squadron =

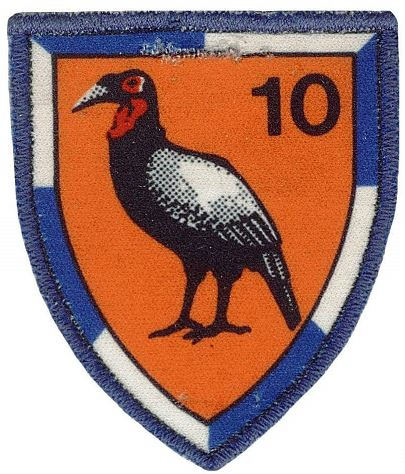
- 10 Armoured Squadron emblem
- Active: 1982 -1985?
- Allegiance: Republic of South Africa
- Branch: South African Army
- Type: Armoured Regiment
- Part of: South African Armoured Corps; Army Conventional Reserve
- Garrison/HQ: Oshakati Sector 10 South West African Operation Area
- Equipment: Eland 90 armoured car
- Battle honours: Operation Askari

Commanders
- First OC: Captain E van Jaarsveld

Insignia
- Beret Colour: Black
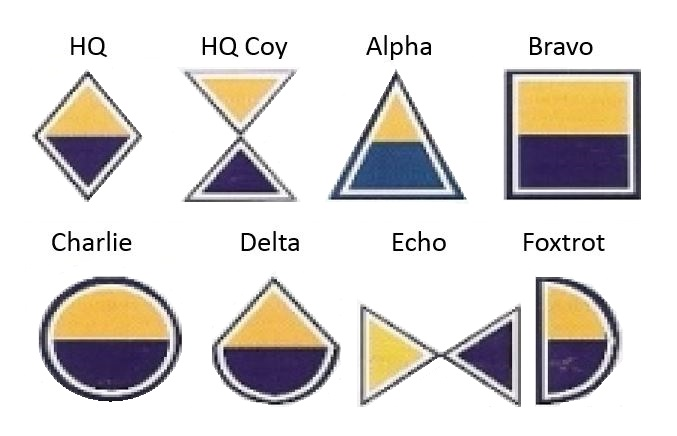
- Armour Squadron emblems

- Armour beret bar circa 1992

10 Armoured Car Squadron was a contingent of the South African Armoured Corps posted in Sector 10, South West Africa, during the South African Border War.

== History ==
=== Origin ===
10 Armoured Squadron's home unit was 1 Special Service Battalion (1SSB), Bloemfontein. In addition to the personnel from 1 SSB or 2 SSB in South Africa, the Squadron also had a small contingent of infantry. These alternated with personnel from 2 SAI (Walvis Bay) to 7 SAI (Phalaborwa). These infantry soldiers were tasked with duties around Oshakati, such as manning check points at the gates.

=== Oshikati base ===
10 Armoured Squadron was housed in the Sector 10 Oshakati HQ compound at first, but by 1983 a purpose built base for 10 Armoured Squadron was completed and it subsequently moved in. The unit was based in the camp north-west of the white compound of Oshakati, but not part of the Sector HQ compound. It was surrounded by the familiar bulldozed soil walls. About all that could be seen of the 10 Armoured Squadron camp from the road was the steel hall building. Most of the troops seemed to be accommodated in tents. There were some brick buildings, which included a chaplain's work space and coffee bar. The senior officers had prefabricated offices.

=== Attack on Calueque Dam ===
The Cubans opened a second front on 27 June 1988 against the South Africans and launched a ground offensive in the direction of Calueque Dam in Southern Angola. The area to the north of the dam became the scene of fighting. MiG-23 aircraft attacked the facilities, bombing a bridge, sluice gates, a pump, a generator, and a pipeline to Ovamboland in three waves. 7 soldiers from 8 SAI and 4 from 1 SSB/10 Armoured Squadron lost their lives in this engagement.

=== Unit emblem ===
By 1984, a unit flash was worn.

=== External Operations ===
10 Armoured Squadron appears to have been involved in Operation Askari. 10 Armoured Squadron conducted escort duty for civilian movements in the operation area as well.

=== Known Commanders ===
- 1982: Captain Eddie van Jaarsveld and WO2 JJ Jacobs.
- 1983: WO2 John Wahl.
