= Tchimporo-Yonde =

- Commune
- Country: Angola
- Province: Cunene
- Time zone: UTC+1 (WAT)
- Climate: Aw

Tchimporo-Yonde is a town and commune of Angola, located in the province of Cunene.

== See also ==
- Communes of Angola
