= Namacunde =

Namacunde Namakunde
- Municipality and town
- Location in Angola
- Coordinates: 17°18′S 15°51′E
- Country: Angola
- Province: Cunene Province

Area
  - Total: 4,132 sq mi (10,701 km^{2})
- Elevation: 3,640 ft (1,110 m)

Population (2014 Census)
  - Total: 142,047
- Time zone: UTC+1 (WAT)
- Climate: BSh

Namacunde or Namakunde is a town and municipality in Cunene Province in Angola. The municipality had a population of 142,047 in 2014.

== History as a mission station ==
Namacunde was a mission station of the Rhenish Mission Society in Oukwanyama in southern Angola, located 25 kilometres (16 mi) to the south-east of Ondjiva.

Namacunde mission was founded in 1900 by the German missionary Wilhelm Ickler. At the time it was thought that the area was part of German South West Africa. Just as Ickler had begun the construction of the third mission German mission station in Oukwanyama, he fell ill with malaria and blackwater fever and died on 22 June 1900.

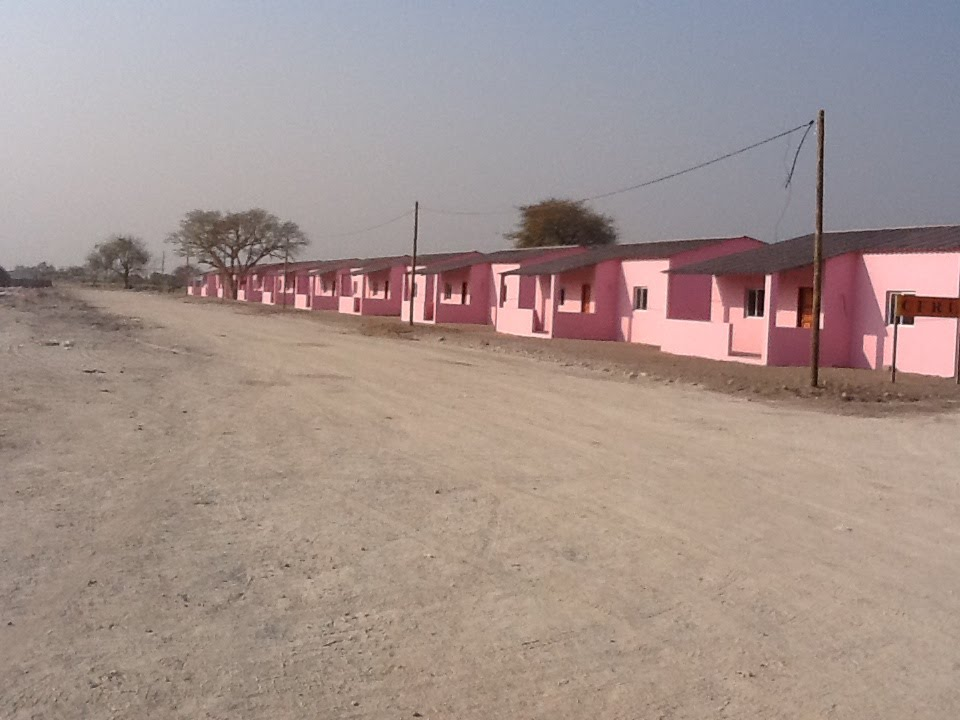

In November 1915 the Germans had to leave Namacunde, as it became the border station between Portuguese West Africa and British South West Africa.

== Transport ==
Namakunde lies on the route of the proposed railway linking Angola and Namibia.

== See also ==
- Railway stations in Namibia
