= Curoca =

Coordinates: 17°15′S 14°01′E

Curoca Kuroka
- Municipality
- Interactive map of Curoca
- Country: Angola
- Province: Cunene

Area
  - Total: 7,998 km^{2} (3,088 sq mi)

Population (2014 Census)
  - Total: 41,087
  - Density: 7.05/km^{2} (18.3/sq mi)
- Time zone: UTC+1 (WAT)

Curoca or Kuroka is a municipality in Cunene Province in Angola. The municipality had a population of 41,087 in 2014. It used to be called Vila de Aviz.

Its main town is named Onkokwa.
