= Cahama =

- Municipality and town
- Location in Angola
- Coordinates: 16°17′S 14°19′E
- Country: Angola
- Province: Cunene

Area
  - Total: 9,700 km^{2} (3,700 sq mi)

Population (2014 Census)
  - Total: 70,061
  - Density: 7.2/km^{2} (19/sq mi)
- Time zone: UTC+1 (WAT)
- Climate: BSh

Cahama is a town, with a population of 12,767 (2014 census), and a municipality of Cunene Province, Angola. The population of the municipality was 70,061 according to the 2014 census in an area of 9,700 km^{2}. The municipality consists of the communes Cahama and Otchinjau. There is an airport (FN17) to the north of the town.
