= Xangongo =

- commune and town
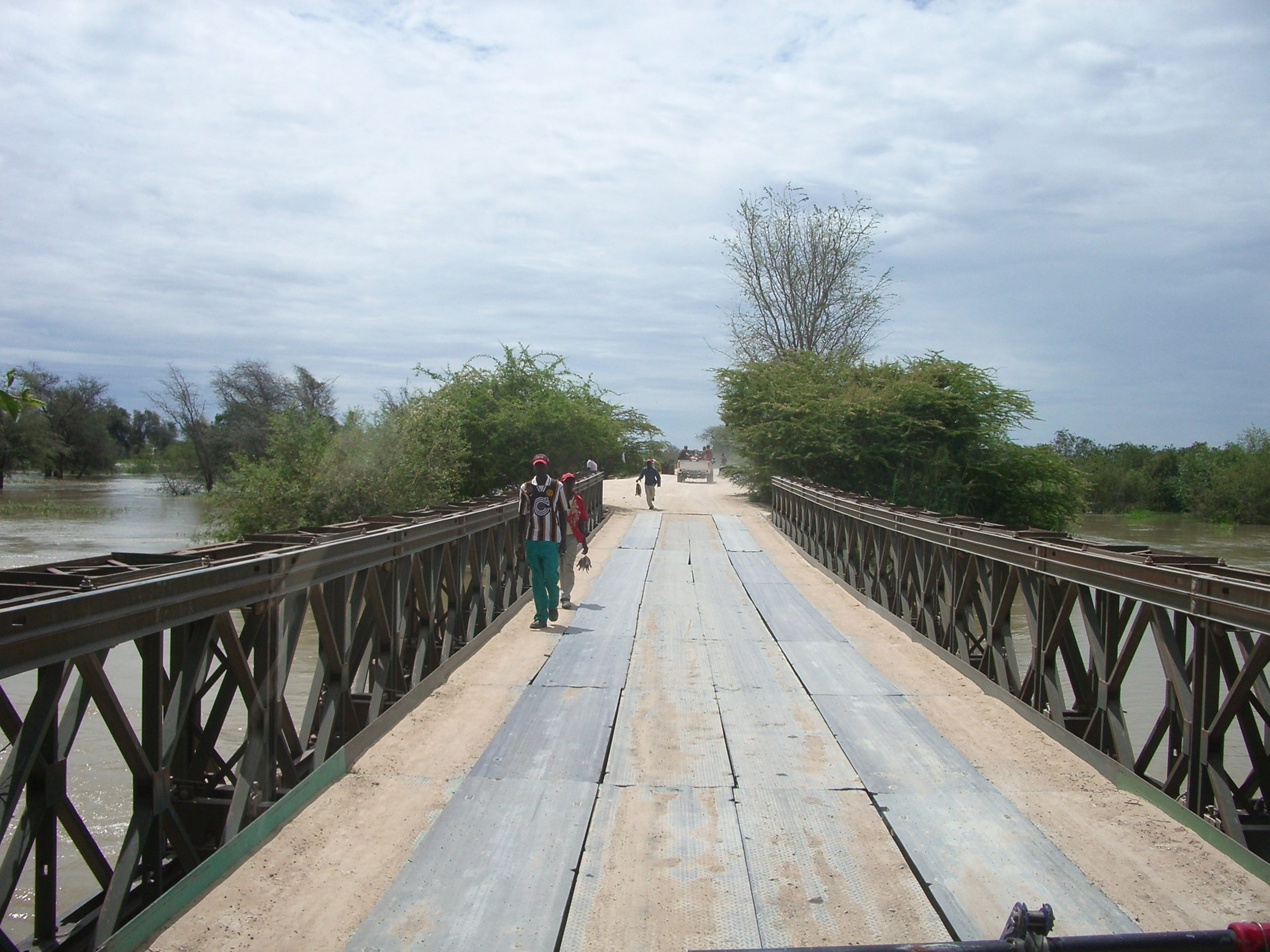

- Location in Angola
- Coordinates: 16°44′48″S 14°58′29″E
- Country: Angola
- Province: Cunene
- Municipality: Ombadja

Area
  - Total: 1,000 sq mi (2,580 km^{2})

Population (2014)
  - Total: 70,568
  - Density: 70.8/sq mi (27.4/km^{2})
- Time zone: UTC+1 (WAT)
- Climate: BSh

Xangongo (pre-1975: Vila Roçadas) is a town with a population of 35,000 (2014), and a commune in the municipality of Ombadja, within the province of Cunene, in Angola.

Xangongo is also the seat of Ombadja municipality. The commune was also the site of considerable fighting in the Namibian War of Independence and the Angolan Civil War.

== Xangongo and SWAPO ==
Xangongo was the headquarters of SWAPO's "northwestern front." A South African military operation called "Operation Protea" occurred on August 23, 1981. Its aim was to destroy SWAPO in the Angolan towns of Xangongo and Ondjiva. It was very successful and significantly boosted the South African military operations against both SWAPO and the Angolan military. The bridge over the Cunene River was destroyed by SADF Special Forces and the town was held for many years by South Africa. At the end of the Battle of Cuito Cuanavale the Fidel Castro 50th Brigade moved in and started harassing the withdrawing SADF forces, triggering Operation Excite/Hilti. In response to this harassment the SADF mobilized 81 Armoured Brigade in Operation Desert Fox, designed to neutralize the Cuban 50th Division, but this was not necessary because of the successful negotiations that ended the South African involvement in the Angolan Civil War.

== Transport ==
The area is served by Xangongo Airport.
