= Cuvelai =

- Municipality and town
- Location in Angola
- Coordinates: 15°40′00″S 15°48′00″E
- Country: Angola
- Province: Cunene

Area
  - Total: 16,270 km^{2} (6,280 sq mi)
- Elevation: 1,231 m (4,039 ft)

Population (2014 Census)
  - Total: 57,398
  - Density: 2.97/km^{2} (7.7/sq mi)
- Time zone: UTC+1 (WAT)

Cuvelai is a town and municipality in Cunene Province in Angola. The municipality had a population of 57,398 in 2014.

== Namesake ==
There are a number of towns in Angola with this name.
