= Oukwanyama =

Historic kingdom spanning southern Angola and northern Namibia

Oukwanyama (Uukwanyama in the neighbouring Oshindonga dialect) is a traditional kingdom of the Ovambo people in what is today northern Namibia and southern Angola. Its capital is Oihole. They caused one of the biggest defeats in Portuguese colonial history at the Battle of the Cunene in 1904.

== List of rulers ==
The Oukwanyama Kingdom and King Mandume Museum is located at Omhedi. They speak the Kwanyama dialect.

The list of Oukwanyama kings, their kingdoms and estimated reigning time consists of;

- Kambungu ka Muheya (Onambambi-Onehula) around 1600
- Shitenhu (Oshiteve) around 1600
- Kawengeko (Ondjiva) around 1600
- Mushindi ua Kanhene Uandja (Ondjiva) around 1600
- Kavonga ka Haindongo (Ondjiva) around 1600
- Heita ya Muvale (Ondjiva) around 1690
- Hautolonde ya Uandja (Ondjiva) 1755-1760
- Mutota wa Haipiya (Ondjiva) 1760-1766
- Shimbilinga sha Nailimbi (Ondjiva) 1766-1806
- Haihambo ya Mukwanhuli (Ondjiva) 1806-1807
- Hamangulu Nahambo ya Naivala (Ondjiva) 1807-1811
- Haimbili ya Haufiku (Ondjiva) 1811-1858
- Haikukutu yaShinangolo (Ondjiva) 1858-1859
- Sheefeni sha Hamukuyu (Ondjiva) 1859-1862
- Mweshipandeka ya Shaningika (Ondjiva) 1862-1882
- Namhadi ya Mweihanyeka (Ondjiva) 1882-1884
- Ueyulu ya Hedimbi (Ondjiva) 1884-1904
- Nande ya Hedimbi (Omukumbwaimbi) 1904–1911)
- Mandume ya Ndemufayo (Ondjiva) 1911-1917
- Cornelius Mwetupunga Shelungu (Omhedi) 1998-2005
- Martha Mwadinomho ya Kristian ya Nelumbu (Omhedi) 2005 –

== See also ==
- Category:Christian mission stations in Oukwanyama
