= Cunene Province =

Province of Angola

Coordinates: 16°42′S 16°3′E

Cunene
- Province
- Country: Angola
- Capital: Ondjiva

Government
  - Governor: Gerdina Ulipamue Didalewa
  - Vice-Governor for the Political, Economic and Social Sector: Apolo Ndinoulenga
  - Vice-Governor for Technical Services and Infrastructures: António Gilberto Augusto Matias

Area
  - Total: 87,342 km^{2} (33,723 sq mi)

Population (2024 census)
  - Total: 1,806,417
  - Density: 20.682/km^{2} (53.566/sq mi)
- Time zone: UTC+1 (WAT)
- Area code: 035
- ISO 3166 code: AO-CNN
- HDI (2018): 0.509 low · 14th
- Website: www.cunene.gov.ao

Cunene is a province of Angola. It has an area of 87,342 km^{2} and a population of 1,806,417 in 2024.

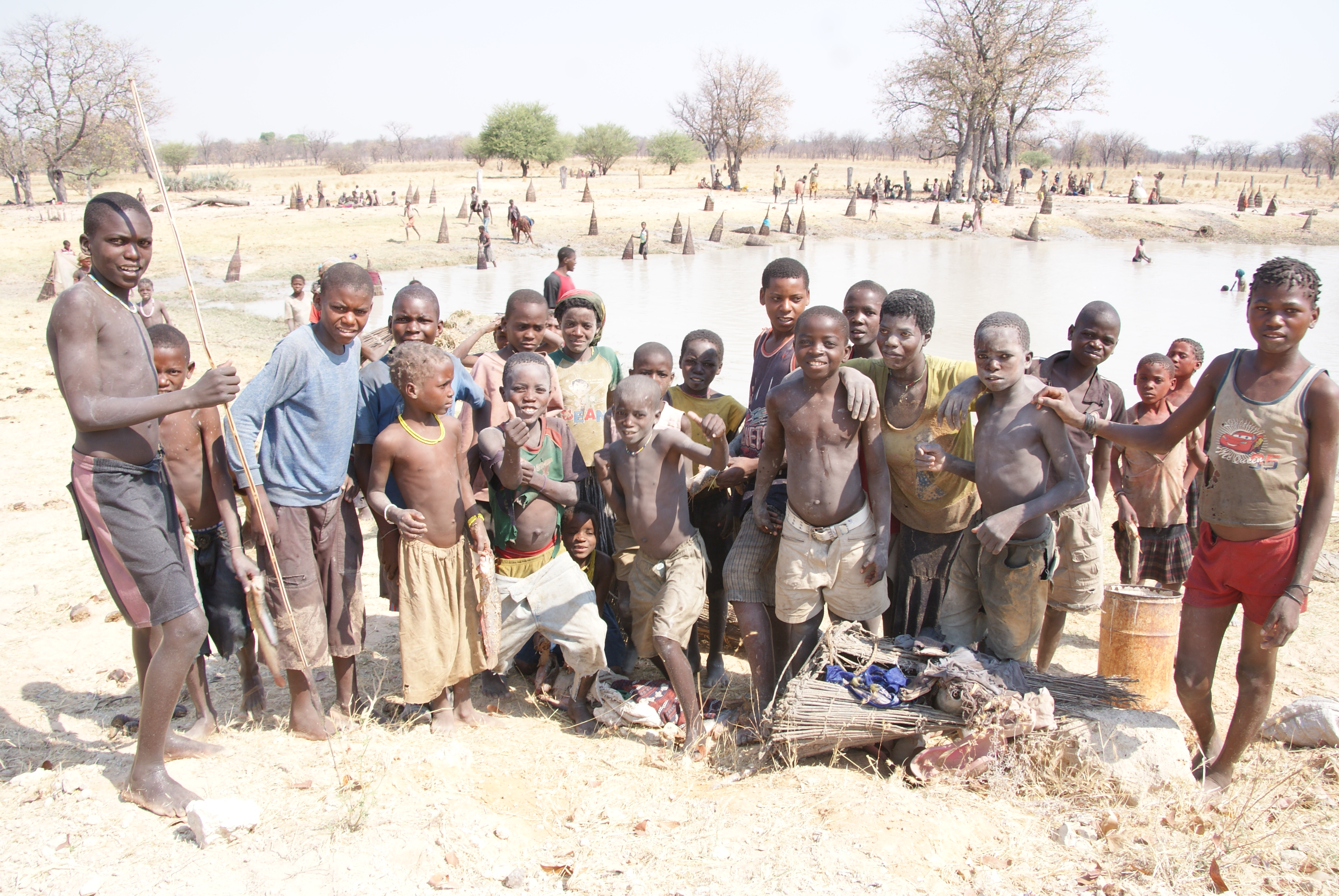
Catching catfish in Cunene Province.

Ondjiva is the capital of the province; it was previously known as Vila Pereira d’Eça. Ondjiva is the only city in this province with the distance from Ondjiva to Luanda is 1424 km and to Lubango is 415 km. The Cunene River gave its name to the province.

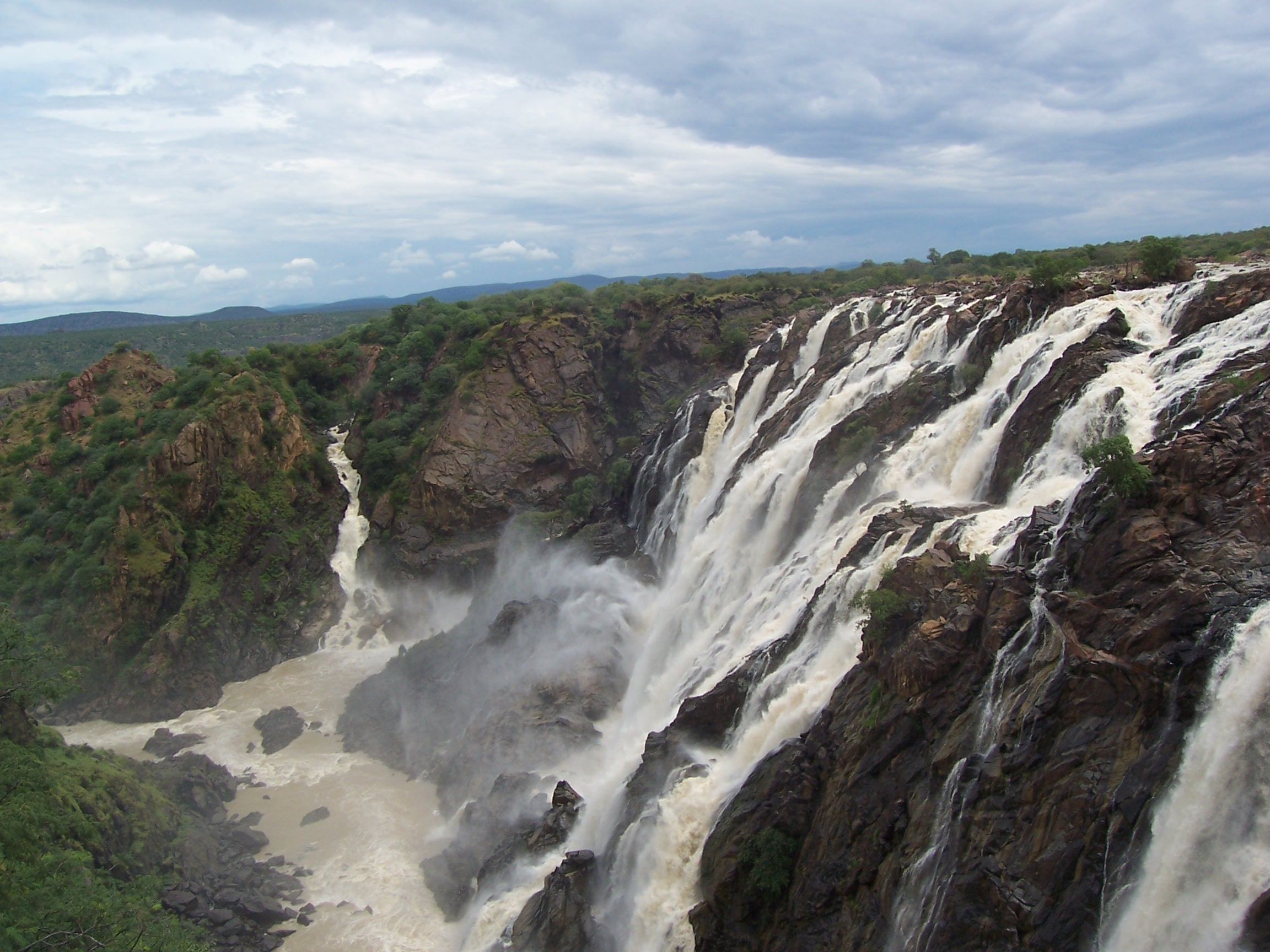
Ruacana Falls

Cunene lies north of the Cunene River, which forms the border between Angola and Namibia. Cunene is traversed by the northwesterly line of equal latitude and longitude.

During World War I the region was the scene of fighting in 1914–15. The German campaign in Angola resulted in Germany's temporary occupation of the area.

The inhabitants of the Province are overwhelmingly Ovambo pastoralists. Since the 1960s, they have been under pressure first from white settlers, and after independence from high-ranking military officers and politicians, who acquired large extensions of land which the Ovambo need for the transhumance of their cattle. The ecological, economic and social disadvantages of pastoralism over ranching has been known since the 1970s, but has not been sufficiently taken into account in policy making.

== Municipalities ==
The province of Cunene contains six municipalities (Portuguese: municípios):

- Cahama
- Kuroka (Curoca)
- Kuvelai (Cuvelai)
- Kwanhama (Cuanhama)
- Namakunde (Namacunde)
- Ombadja

== Communes ==
The province of Cunene contains the following communes (Portuguese: comunas); sorted by their respective municipalities:

- Cahama Municipality: – Cahama, Oxinjau (Otchinjau)
- Kuroka Municipality: – Chitado, Oncócua
- Kuvelai Municipality: – Calonga, Cuvati (Cubati), Mucolongodijo (Mukolongodjo), Mupa (Omunda)
- Kwanhama Municipality: – Evale, Môngua, Nehone-Cafima, Ondjiva, Simporo (Tchimporo-Yonde)
- Namakunde Municipality: – Melunga-Chiede, Namakunde (Namacunde)
- Ombadja Municipality: – Humbe, Mucope, Naulila, Ombala yo Mungu, Xangongo

== List of governors of Cunene ==
Name	Years in office
Kundi Paihama	1976–1979
Capt Ary da Costa	1979–1982
Pedro Mutindi	1983–2008
António Didalelwa	2008–2016
Kundi Paihama	2016–2018
Vigílio da Ressurreição Bernardo Adriano Tyova	2018–2020
Gerdina Ulipamue Didalelwa	2020–

Up to 1991, the official name was Provincial Commissioner.

== In popular culture ==
In Call of Duty: Black Ops II, the UNITA under Jonas Savimbi assists CIA operatives Alex Mason and Jason Hudson to find the CIA remnants under Woods held by the MPLA and the Cubans.

== See also ==
- Kunene Region in Namibia
