= Ondjiva =

Ondjiva Vila Pereira d'Eça
- Commune
- Location in Angola
- Coordinates: 17°04′S 15°44′E
- Country: Angola
- Province: Cunene
- Municipality: Cuanhama

Area
  - Total: 2,100 km^{2} (810 sq mi)
- Elevation: 1,098 m (3,602 ft)

Population (2014)
  - Total: 187,914
  - Density: 89/km^{2} (230/sq mi)
- Time zone: UTC+1 (WAT)
- Climate: BSh

Ondjiva, formerly Vila Pereira d'Eça, is a town, with a population of 121,537 (2014), and a commune in the municipality of Cuanhama, province of Cunene, Angola. It is also the administrative capital of Cunene Province and is located at the extreme south of the country, about 42 kilometres (26 mi) from the border with Namibia. It was traditionally the seat of the Ovambo king of the Oukwanyama tribe. Ondjiva was greatly affected by the Angolan Civil War (1975-2002).

== History ==
=== Mission station ===
The Ondjiva mission station was established first in 1891 by Friedrich Meisenholl and August Wulfhorst of the Rhenish Mission Society, and with the help of Friedrich Bernsmann and with the permission of King Weyulu Hedimbi. They thought that Ondjiva would have been in the territory of German South West Africa, which later turned out not to be the case. The following year they established the mission station of Omupanda.

Meisenholl stayed in Ondjiva for some four years, before he had to leave due to a serious illness. Wilhelm Stahlhut came to replace him in the mid-1890s. Stahlhut’s three children died in Africa, and finally he himself fell ill with blackwater fever and died in Outjo on 1 May 1900. His widow stayed for many years, first in Oukwanyama and then in Hereroland.

In August 1915, King Mandume had the mission station burned, and the Germans had to flee to Ondonga in South West Africa.

Ondjiva later became a Catholic mission and the see of the bishop of the Ondjiva Diocese. Fernando Guimaraes Kevanu was the bishop until 2011, and he was to be succeeded by Rev. Pio Hipunyati.

=== Angolan Civil War ===
Ondjiva was largely destroyed during the Angolan Civil War. The administration of the city operated from Huíla Province, and in theory ruled Cunene Province in exile. Most of the population left the city by 1989, and by 1999 was home to fewer than 5,000 residents. Reconstruction efforts began after the advent of peace in 2002. Ondjiva initially experienced slow population growth but saw a significant return of its residents and new migration from other regions of Angola, notably from Huíla Province from 1998 and 2000.

== Demographics ==
Ondjiva has traditionally been a center of the Kwanyama, Oshikwanyama being a standardized dialect of the Oshiwambo language. The resettlement of the city after the Angolan Civil War saw an influx of people from other areas of the country, notably Huíla Province. 30.4 per cent of the residents of the city speak Portuguese, significantly lower than that in the capital of Luanda. 28.2 per cent of the population speak Kwanhama.

== Geography ==
=== Neighborhoods ===
Ondjiva consists of 12 neighborhoods, or bairros.

- Pioneiro Zeca I
- Pioneiro Zeca II
- Bangula I
- Bangula II
- Kafito I
- Kafito II
- Kachila I
- Kachila II
- Naipalala I
- Naipalala II
- Castilhos
- Kakuluvale

== Transport ==
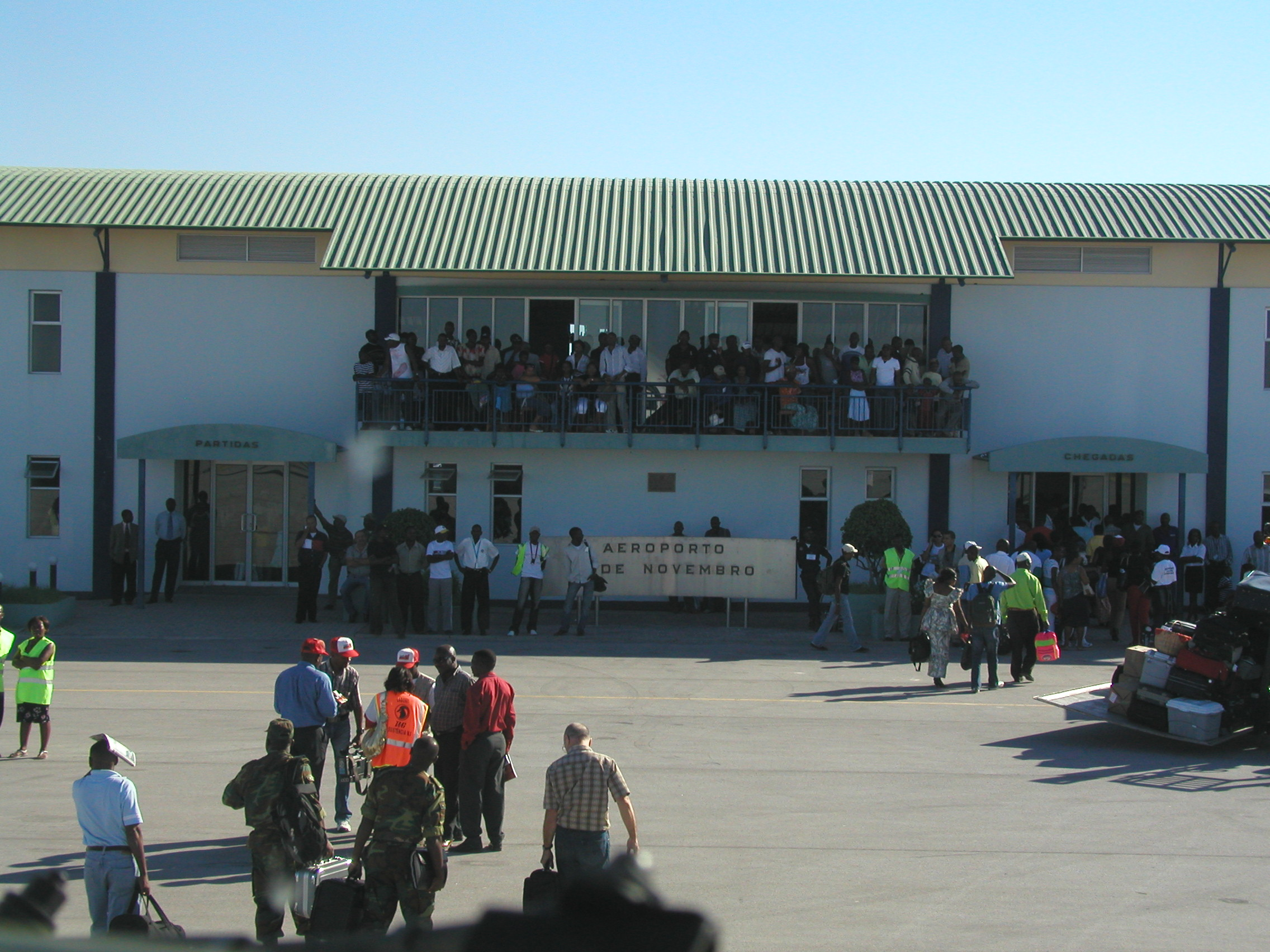
Ondjiva Pereira Airport, 2008

Ondjiva is served by Ondjiva Pereira Airport, also known as Aeroporto 11 de Novembro. The airport is located to the northwest of the city center. It is served by TAAG Angola Airlines with connections to Luanda, Catumbela, and Kuito.

A planned rail connection to Namibia on the Moçâmedes Railway remains unbuilt.

== Annual Trade Fair ==
Ondjiva holds annual 15-day trade fair in July. During this time exhibition are organized so that companies in a specific industry can showcase and demonstrate their latest products, service.

== Notable people ==
- Marcelina Vahekeni, Miss Angola 2012, delegate to the Miss Universe 2012 pageant

== See also ==
- Railway stations in Angola
- Railway stations in Namibia
