= Battle of Magul =

1895 Portuguese colonial battle in Mozambique

- Part of the Portuguese conquest of the Gaza Empire
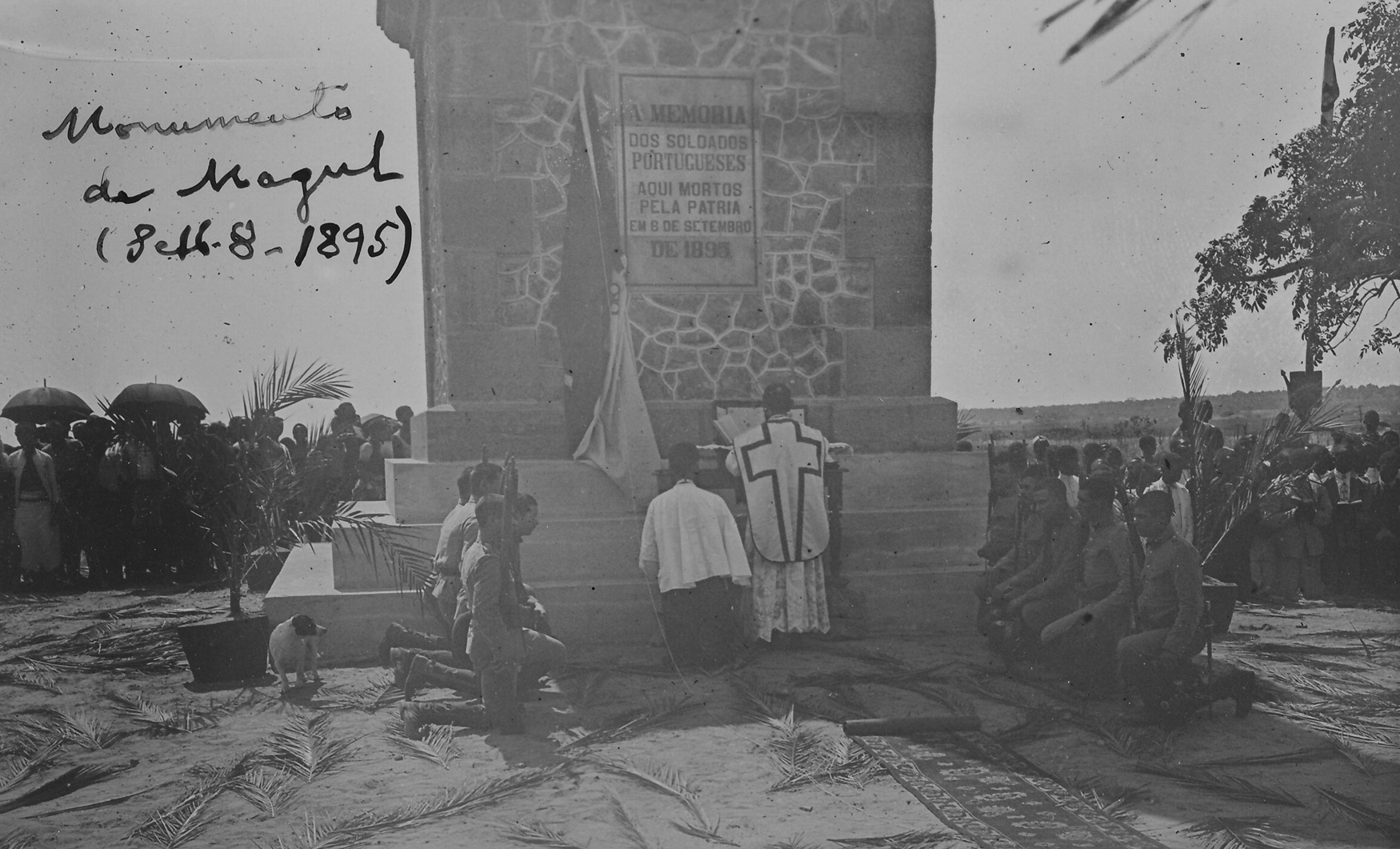
- Monument to the Battle of Magul
Date	8 September, 1895
Location	Magul, Mozambique
Result	Portuguese victory

Belligerents
Portuguese Empire	Gaza Empire

Commanders and leaders
Freire de Andrade	Maguiguana

Strength
600 soldiers	6,000-9,000 men

Casualties and losses
5 killed 26 wounded	300-400 dead

The battle of Magul was an armed engagement between Portuguese forces and those of the Gaza Empire on 8 September 1895, in the territory of modern-day Mozambique. It was part of the Portuguese conquest of the Gaza Empire and resulted in a Portuguese victory.

== History ==
On 1894, the Tsonga subjects of Portugal around Lourenço Marques revolted against the Portuguese administration, under the leadership of Matibejana of Mafumo, a son of Gungunhana. The Tsonga rebels attacked Lourenço Marques, but they were repulsed and later defeated at the battle of Marracuene. They then fled to the Gaza Empire, where they were granted asylum by Gungunhana.

Relations between Portugal and Gaza had been strained since Gungunhana had long favoured the British Empire and negotiated directly with the British South Africa Company in a breach of treaties signed with the Portuguese. When the Tsonga revolt broke out, many suspected he had incited it at the behest of Cecil Rhodes, who contested Portuguese claims to Mozambique. The Portuguese government therefore decided to have Gaza formally annexed and dispatched António Enes to Mozambique as Royal Commissioner, with overarching powers to carry out the task.

Several foreign observers doubted the possibility of subduing Gaza but Enes considered Gungunhana to be overrated. He planned a two-pronged offensive: one detachment would depart from Lourenço Marques in the south and another from Inhambane in the east. They were to close in on Manjacaze, the Vátua capital.

Stationed at Xinavane, the southern column of the Portuguese force departed for Manjacaze on September 5 before dawn. The African auxiliaries were dispatched to attack the undefended lands of the enemy tribes. Logistics were lacking, but the Portuguese pressed on with high morale.

The southern column was engaged on 8 September at Magul by a 6,000 man force led by Maguiguana. Most of them however, were not Nguni but Tonga vassals of the Vátua. Warned well in advance of the approach of the enemy by mounted scouts, the Portuguese had time to prepare for the assault. They formed an infantry square fortified with thorny bushes and barbed wire laid all around, perhaps the first time this time was used by a European army.

Several hours elapsed before combat as the Africans sought protection under the shade outside of Portuguese range. By about mid-day a number of Portuguese soldiers collapsed from heat-strokes and the Portuguese were unable to procure water or food. Freire de Andrade had a detachment of 32 African soldiers provoke the enemies, and only then did the warriors advance against the Portuguese. The first shots were exchanged by about 1:20 in the afternoon.

The Africans were divided in nine to thirteen mangas or impi-style regiments, and their numbers were variously estimated at 6,000 to 6,500 and 9,000 men. Mahazul and Matibejana commanded two regiments on the right flank, and deployed towards the Portuguese left flank in skirmishing order.

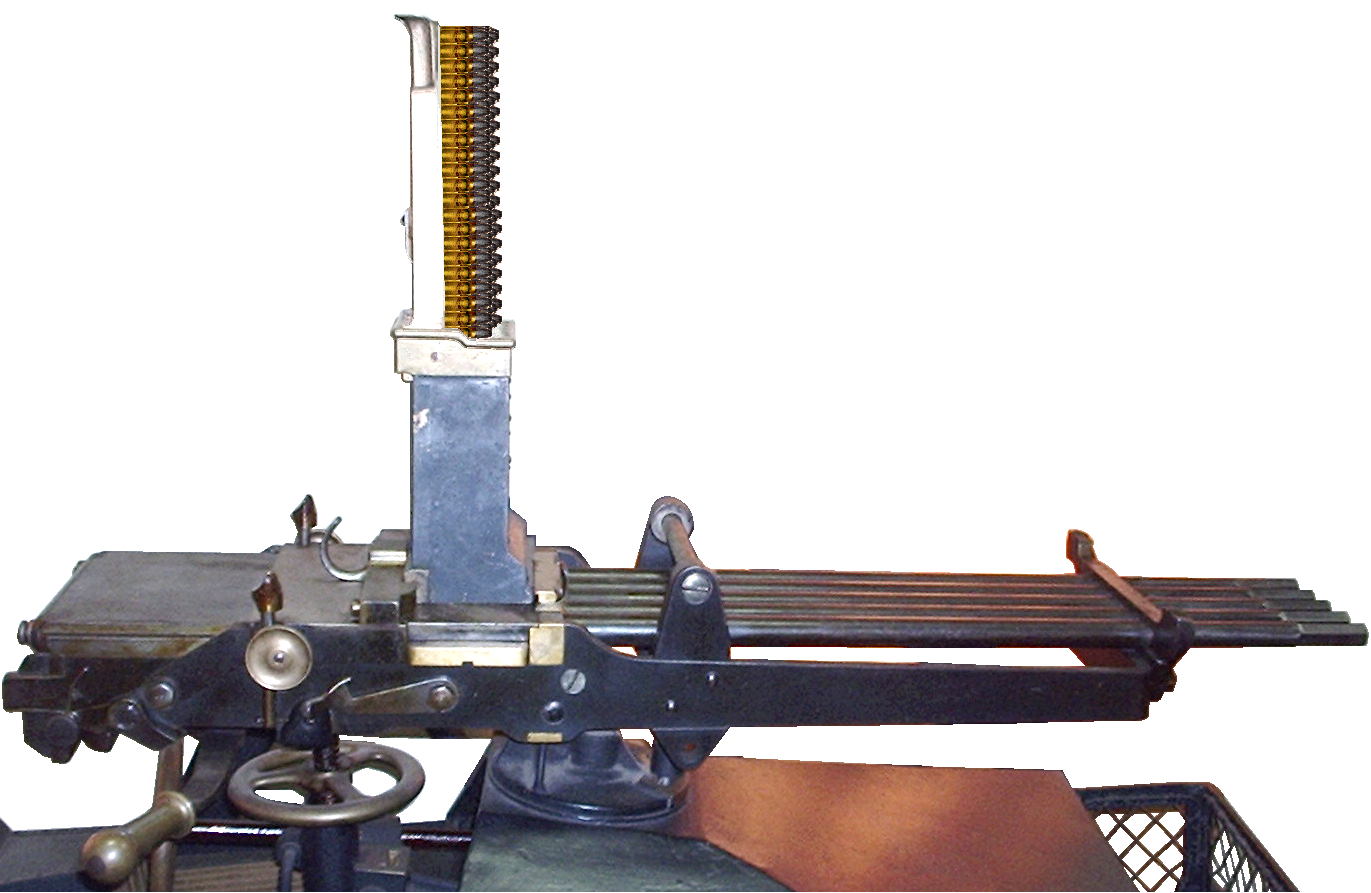
Nordenfelt machine-gun.

The impi-style formations charged the Portuguese square, but they failed to breach the fortified perimeter. The two Nordenfelt machiguns of the Portuguese jammed mid-combat, leaving the corners of the Portuguese formation vulnerable, but Kropatschek rifle fire prevented the Tonga from coming closer than 200 meters. In the end, the Africans were forced to withdraw, having suffered 400 dead. Portuguese losses on the other hand, numbered 5 dead and 26 wounded.

== See also ==
- Portuguese Mozambique
- Campaigns of Pacification and Occupation
