= Second Battle of Macontene =

1897 Portuguese colonial battle in Mozambique

- Part of the Campaigns of Pacification and Occupation and Portuguese conquest of the Gaza Empire
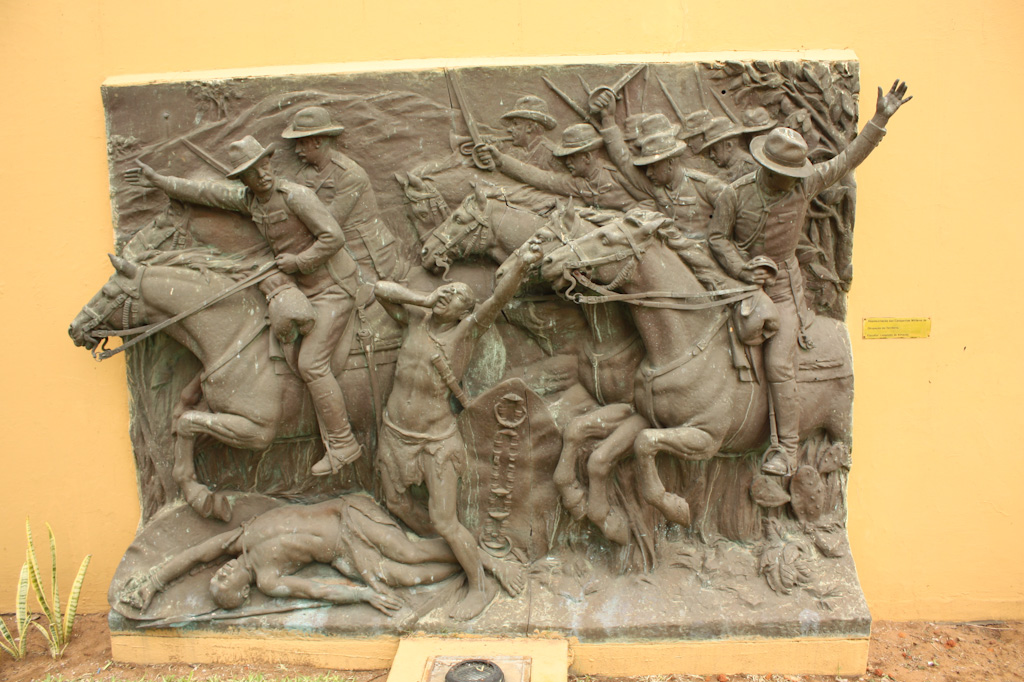
- Bronze relief depicting the Second Battle of Macontene at the Maputo Fortress.
| Date | 21 July, 1897 |
| Location | Macontene, Mozambique |
| Result | Portuguese victory |

Belligerents
| Portuguese Empire | Gaza Empire remnants |

Commanders and leaders
| Joaquim Augusto de Albuquerque | Maguiguana |

Strength
| Unknown | Unknown |

Casualties and losses
| Unknown | Unknown |

The Second Battle of Macontene was a military engagement that took place in Mozambique, in the region of Macontene, a plain of the current district of Chibuto, 10 km from that town, in the province of Gaza. Combat took place between expeditionary forces of the Portuguese Army, which included a large number of men recruited both locally as well as in other Portuguese territories in Africa, and the forces of the Vatua commanded by the rebellious Maguiguana.

The Portuguese had previously subdued the Gaza Empire after capturing Emperor Gungunhana at the Battle of Coolela.

The lack of British troops had allowed the Matabele Rebellion to take place in neighbouring Rhodesia the previous year and in 1897 the Vatua revolted as Portuguese were busy subduing the Namarrães further to the north of Mozambique.

The first encounter took place in May 1897 between Vatua warriors commanded by Maguiguana and two Portuguese expeditionary corps. After an inconclusive battle on 22 of that month, the first expeditionary corps commanded by captain Gomes da Costa, governor of Gaza, attacked the Vatua camp and then withdrew to Chibuto. Following this operation, on July 21, 1897, the second expeditionary corps, commanded by the governor of Portuguese Mozambique, Joaquim Augusto Mouzinho de Albuquerque himself routed the forces of Maguiguana, who perished in combat.

Maguigana fled to the Transvaal, but was pursued, cornered and killed, apparently dying after discharging his revolver into his pursuers.

The Portuguese occupied Gaza afterwards and a peace resulted, which would last with few incidents for about 60 years until the start of the Mozambican War of Independence in the 1960s.

A bronze relief panel depicting the cavalry charge at Macontene in 1897 is currently housed at the Maputo Fortress.

== See also ==
- Portuguese Mozambique
- Campaigns of Pacification and Occupation
- Battle of Coolela
- Portuguese conquest of the Gaza Empire
