= List of recipients of the Grand Cross of the Order of the Colonial Empire =

The Order of the Colonial Empire (Portuguese:"Ordem do Império Colonial") was a Portuguese Order (decoration), established on 13 April 1932 as a colonial order of knighthood, to reward services by soldiers and civilians in the Portuguese colonies in Asia and Africa. It was discontinued after the Carnation Revolution in 1974.

Source for the list: "Entidades Nacionais Agraciadas com Ordens Portuguesas", Ordens Honoríficas Portuguesas (Office of the President of Portugal). Retrieved 19 February 2019.

== Portuguese recipients ==
Name	Date
Armindo Rodrigues Monteiro	21 April 1932
Dr António de Oliveira Salazar	21 April 1932
Lieutenant-Colonel Aires de Ornelas de Vasconcelos	14 July 1932
Major Alfredo Augusto Caldas Xavier	14 July 1932
General José Augusto Alves Roçadas	14 July 1932
General Pedro Francisco Massano de Amorim	14 July 1932
General Alfredo Augusto Freire de Andrade	14 July 1932
João Belo	14 July 1932
Major Joaquim Mousinho de Albuquerque	14 July 1932
Major Alvaro Xavier de Castro	14 July 1932
Major Eduardo Augusto Ferreira da Costa	14 July 1932
General António Júlio da Costa Pereira d'Eça	14 July 1932
António José Enes	14 July 1932
General Eduardo Augusto Rodrigues Galhardo	14 July 1932
Henrique de Paiva Couceiro	3 August 1932
General João de Almeida	3 August 1932
João António de Azevedo Coutinho Fragoso de Siqueira	3 August 1932
General Eduardo Augusto Marques	9 April 1934
Colonel José Ricardo Pereira Cabral	7 September 1935
Dr Machado Francisco José Vieira	20 June 1936
Colonel António Lopes Mateus	17 November 1938
Companhia de Moçambique	8 December 1939
Vice-Admiral Carlos Viegas Gago Coutinho	28 January 1943
Captain-Lieutenant Ernesto Jardim de Vilhena	27 November 1944
Bishop José da Costa Nunes	6 September 1946
Colonel António Vicente Ferreira	3 December 1946
Major João Teixeira Pinto	26 February 1947
Professor Dr Marcelo José das Neves Alves Caetano	16 December 1953
Admiral Manuel Maria Sarmento Rodrigues	12 June 1957
Sociedade de Geografia de Libboa	12 June 1957
Chief Inspector António Trigo de Morais	16 November 1964
Professor Dr Joaquim Moreira da Silva Cunha	13 August 1970

== Foreign recipients ==
Name	Date	Note	Country
George V	19 February 1934	King of the United Kingdom	United Kingdom
Albert Vleeschauwer	10 October 1942		Belgium
Pedro Cortina Mauri	28 December 1960	Minister Plenipotentiary	Spain
José Ibanez Martin	14 February 1962		Spain
