= Maputo campaign =

The Maputo campaign was a brief expedition carried out by Mouzinho de Albuquerque between late January and mid-March 1896 against the Kingdom of Maputo, which was annexed to Portuguese Mozambique as a constituency of the ‘district of Lourenço Marques’.

Maputo was one of the Tsonga kingdoms that was vassal or a protectorate of the Portuguese Crown. During the Portuguese conquest of the Gaza Empire, King Guanazi of Maputo had pledged to assist the Portuguese but deserted with his warriors after the Portuguese had supplied him with weapons. Once Gaza was annexed, most of the troops in the expedition returned to Europe, and the king extorted merchants, killed his subjects and threatened the Catholic mission in Macassane after some Africans employed at the mission committed theft. At the end of January 1896, Governor-general Joaquim da Graça requested Mouzinho de Albuquerque to head an expedition to Maputo in defence of the Catholic mission.

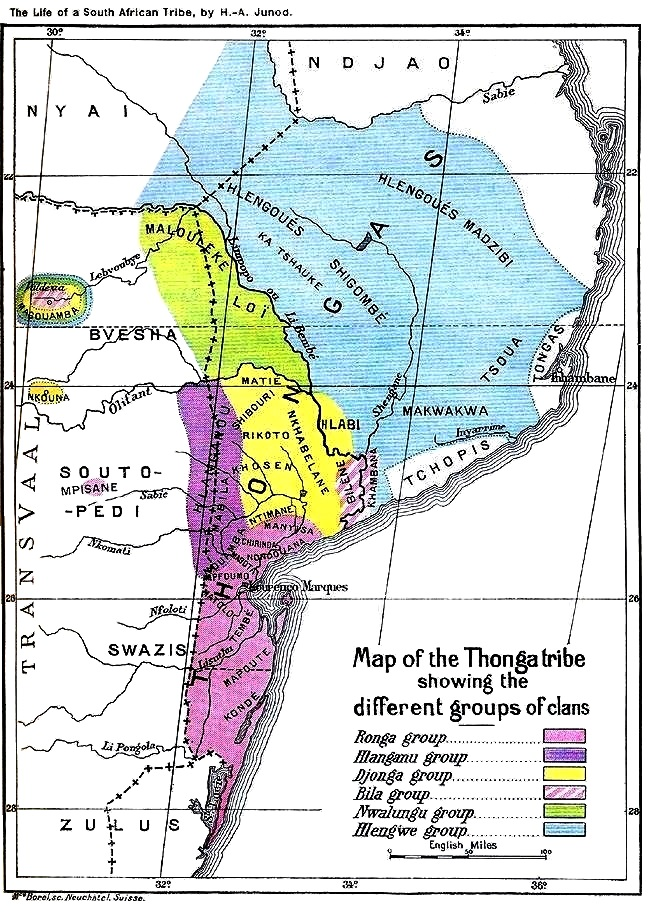
Tsonga kingdoms, with "Mapoute" marked to the south of Maputo bay.

Mouzinho de Albuquerque landed in Salamanga, on the south bank of the Maputo Bay, with 30 men and reached Macassane, but by then king Guanazi had already left. Mouzinho de Albuquerque was provided at that location with 17 horses, 60 infantry soldiers, 20 of whom were European and 40 African, and 200 auxiliary warriors from Tembe. Guanazi's brother handed general Chibite over to the Portuguese, along with two letters showing that the king was in contact with the British. By mid-March, the Portuguese had already marched across the kingdom of Maputo and extracted taxes from 2,000 villages, while king Guanazi crossed the border into Natal with 500 warriors and 3,000 subjects. Maputo was annexed to Mozambique and on his return, Mouzinho de Albuquerque was promoted to Governor-general of Mozambique.

== See also ==
- Campaigns of Pacification and Occupation
- Tsonga Kingdoms
