= Battle of Coolela =

1895 Portuguese colonial battle in Mozambique

- Part of the Portuguese conquest of the Gaza Empire
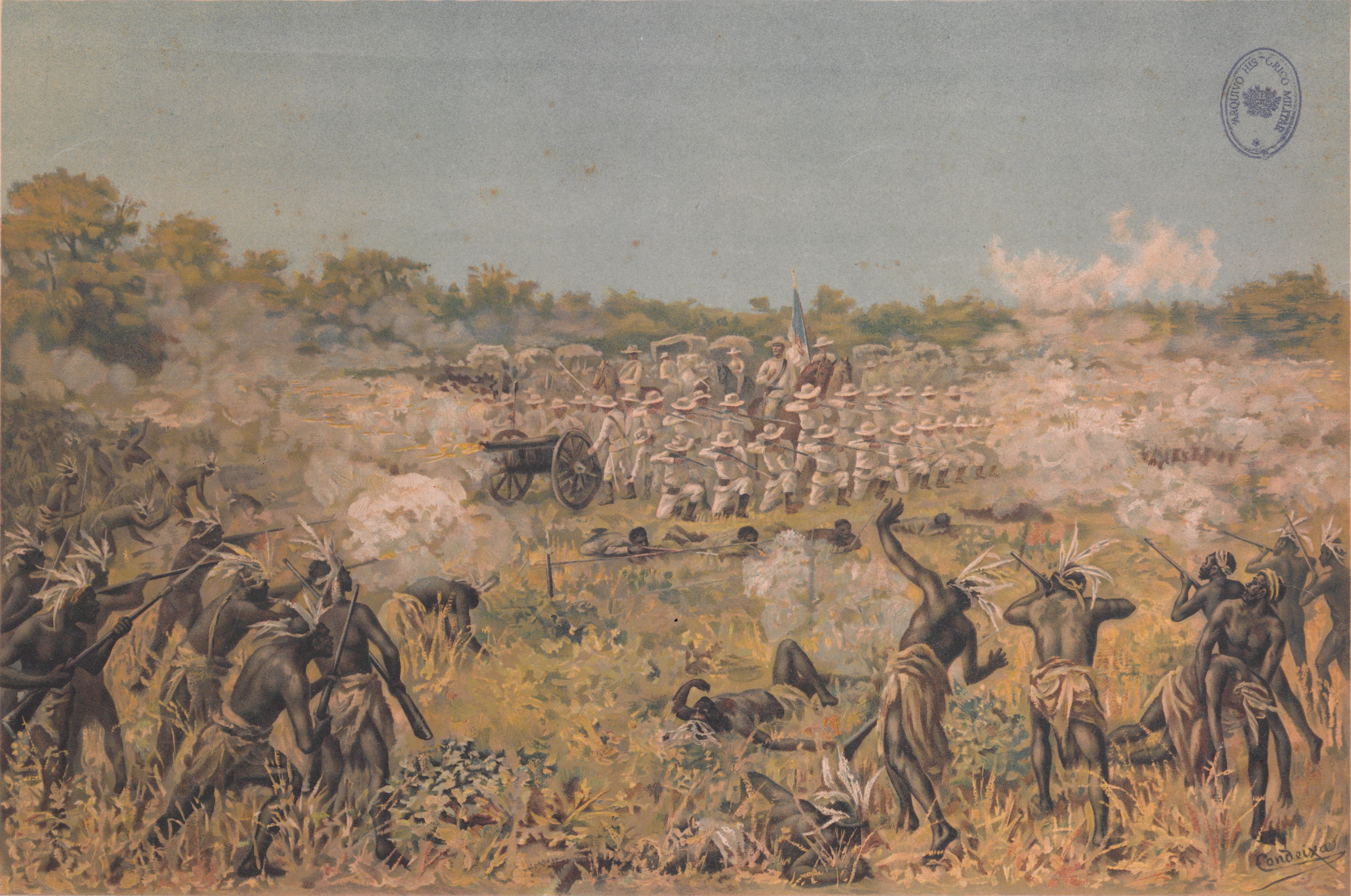
- The Combat of Coolela by Ernesto Condeixa
Date	7 November 1895
Location	Coolela, Mozambique
Result	Portuguese victory

Belligerents
Portuguese Empire	Gaza Empire

Commanders and leaders
M. de Albuquerque; Eduardo Galhardo	Gungunhana; Maguiguana

Strength
631 Europeans; 100 sepoys 500 native auxiliaries 6 guns	10,000–12,000 men 3,000 rifles

Casualties and losses
5 killed 21 wounded	305 killed 600–900 wounded

The Battle of Coolela (Batalha de Coolela in Portuguese) was fought on 7 November 1895 between Portuguese forces commanded by Colonel Eduardo Galhardo and forces of the Gaza Empire commanded by Emperor Gungunhana. The clash took place in the context of the Portuguese Campaigns of Pacification and Occupation in Mozambique, a struggle aimed at resisting Portuguese occupation, and took place in the vicinity of the Coolela swamp, in the district of Manjacaze, province of Gaza.

== Context ==
As a response to the violence caused by the attacks on Lourenço Marques and the refusal to submit to Portuguese authorities, the Portuguese administration demanded the delivery an annual payment of 10,000 pounds in gold and authorization for the collection of taxes and other commercial and military from the kings Matibejane and Maazul. Gungunhana probably did not want a confrontation with the Portuguese, but the war-faction led by Maguiguana won out, therefore he gathered all his mangas of warriors under the command of Maguiguana.

While many tribal chiefs refused to send their men to reinforce the Portuguese, Maguiguana managed to assemble around 10,000 men or eight regiments, equipped with around 2,000 rifles. Of the eight regiments however, five were made up of Ndau or Tonga little inclined to fight for Gungunhana. There was deep dissent within the entourage of the emperor and this along with severe food shortages undermined the armys morale. The Nguni or Vatua were not experienced in guerilla warfare and they could not afford to withdraw from their lands.

== Battle ==
The Portuguese were led by Joaquim Augusto Mouzinho de Albuquerque, and sent forces to Inhambane and invaded Gaza from two directions while an armed flotilla entered the Limpopo.

On the morning of 7 November 1895, the two forces met in the Coolela valley. The Portuguese employed the novel machine-gun against the army of Gaza. The battle was short but with enormous consequences for Gungunhana, who was defeated. By the time the two forces met, the Gaza warriors were demoralized and all but beaten. Gungunhana fled from the Battle to Chaimite, old capital of the Gaza Empire and resting place of Soshangane. With the native resistance broken, on the 11th of November the Portuguese set fire to Manjacaze, the sacred place of the Vatua.

As a result of this victory, many tribal chieftains residing between the Save, Chengane and Limpopo rivers hastened to pay homage to the Portuguese, accepting the consequent impositions.

Demoralized by defeat, Gungunhana withdrew to Chaimite.

Mouzinho de Albuquerque distinguished himself at the action of Coolela. Following his appointment as military governor of the Gaza district, Albuquerque captured Gungunhana with a small force. Albuquerque was recognised for these actions by, among others, his 1896 double appointment as governor-general and royal commissioner of Mozambique.

== See also ==
- Portuguese Mozambique
- Campaigns of Pacification and Occupation
