= António Enes =

António Enes may refer to:

- António José Enes, 19th-century Portuguese journalist and colonial administrator
- António Enes, the name given by Portuguese colonialists to the Mozambican town of Angoche
