= Portuguese conquest of the Gaza Empire =

1895 Portuguese colonial campaign in Mozambique

- Part of the Campaigns of Pacification and Occupation
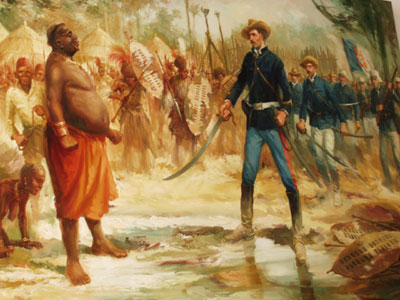
- The capture of Gungunhana by Mouzinho de Albuquerque
Date	23 August 1895 – December 1895
Location	Gaza, Mozambique
Result	Portuguese victory
Territorial changes	Annexation of Gaza by Portugal

Belligerents
Kingdom of Portugal	Gaza Empire

Commanders and leaders
António Enes; Caldas Xavier; M. de Albuquerque; Eduardo Galhardo; Paiva Couceiro	Gungunhana; Roberto Zixaxa; Mahoune

Strength
2,500 men	60,000 men

The Portuguese conquest of the Gaza Empire was an armed conflict that took place in 1895 in territory that is now part of Mozambique. It was part of the Portuguese Campaigns of Pacification and Occupation and Mouzinho de Albuquerque distinguished himself by capturing the Vatua emperor, Gungunhana.

The occupation of Gaza took place during the Scramble for Africa, and Vatua power was weakened by epidemics, famine, youth emigration and internal revolts by subjugated peoples.

The Marracuene and Gaza campaigns were the first of the so-called 'age of the centurions', marked by the rapid annexation of territory by experienced officers of the Portuguese Army sent to Africa ahead of large and well-equipped expeditions, which lasted until 1909.

== Context ==
The Portuguese had been active establishing forts and cities in what is now Mozambique beginning in the 16th century, namely in Sofala, Mozambique Island, Tete, Sena, Quelimane, and Lourenço Marques, modern-day Maputo. In the early 19th century, Anguni tribes migrated to the Gaza region. Among them were the Vatuas, who founded several kingdoms in territory formerly dominated by the Tsonga, who were overwhelmed and reduced to the status of tributary vassals.

After the independence of Brazil, Portugal turned to its territory in Africa, but in the 19th century, several other European powers set out to divide the African continent. Great Britain wished to expand the Cape Colony, while the British South Africa Company sought to establish itself in the Gaza region in Mozambique. One of its directors, the influential magnate Cecil Rhodes, promoted the idea of a Cape to Cairo Railway.

Gungunhana, the Vatua emperor, sought to preserve his independence by negotiating with all parties, taking advantage of traders, diplomats and missionaries to obtain weapons, luxury goods and money. As early as 1870, the Vatua had sent a delegation to visit the Natal Secretary for Native Affairs Theophilus Shepstone, to drum up trade but Shepstone refused to entertain their proposals as he considered the Gaza Nguni to be subjects of the Portuguese, which the Vatua denied. In October 1890 he scored his greatest diplomatic victory, in the form of a mining and railroad concession to the British South Africa Company in exchange for a yearly subsidy and 1000 rifles. The treaties negotiated between Europeans for the division of Africa in 1891 left Gungunhana squarely within the Portuguese sphere of influence however.

In Gaza, meanwhile, Gungunhana moved his capital to Manjacaze, in the low savannah between Limpopo and Inhambane, leading him into wars with the Chope people. The sending of young men to work in the mines of South Africa also forced the Vatua to rely increasingly on warriors from their Tonga subjects rather than Nguni warriors. The Portuguese, for their part, wished to expand Mozambique's territory, establish plantations and build railways but Gungunhana and the British South Africa Company continued to sign agreements, which worried the Portuguese government. Vatua power was weakened, however, by epidemics, famine, emigration and revolts by subjugated peoples, while the First Matabele War demonstrated that a rapid military conquest of the Gaza Empire would be possible.

=== The Tsonga revolt ===
Between Lourenço Marques and the Gaza Empire lay the regulados da Coroa ("Petty Kingdoms of the Crown"), small Tsonga kingdoms that were a protectorate or vassals of Portugal, paid taxes to the Portuguese Crown, provided labour and auxiliary soldiers, whom the Portuguese called landins. Among the Tsongas, however, resentment against Portuguese authority was growing due to the unscrupulous behaviour of labour recruiters and Portuguese merchants.

In 1894, several Tsongan petty kings revolted under the leadership of king Matibejana Zixaxa of Mafumo, who mobilised 1,000 warriors, while Mazul, king of Magaia, mobilised 3,500 warriors. Cheringa, Munhangua and Mutua jointly mobilised 1,300 warriors. The king of Moamba joined the revolt but withdrew soon afterwards.

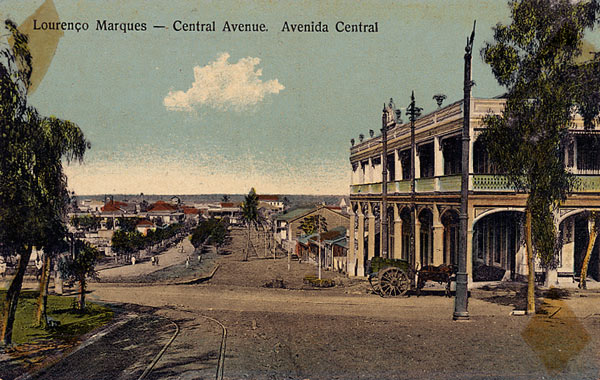
Lourenço Marques, modern-day Maputo, in 1905.

The rebel kings attacked the Anguane post, 20 kilometres north of Lourenço Marques, on 23 September, at a time when only the police forces and a detachment of African troops, the Batalhão de Caçadores da África Oriental nº 3, were in the city, with just over 100 soldiers supported by another 300 armed Europeans.

Lourenço Marques was attacked, but the Tsongas were repelled. In South Africa meanwhile, British newspapers presented the revolt as evidence that Mozambique ought be removed from Portuguese rule. On 15 October, four British warships anchored in the harbour to protect British nationals in the city; they were soon joined by the famous German cruiser Seeadler and among the Portuguese, suspicion grew that the revolt had been instigated by foreign powers, namely the United Kingdom.

In Lisbon, the Portuguese government saw the revolt as an opportunity to organise a major expedition that would assert its control over the region. The moment was critical, as it was close to the inauguration of the railway that would connect Lourenço Marques to Transvaal, confirming the city's importance as the best port in East Africa. Safeguarding southern Mozambique against Cecil Rhodes and the British South Africa Company was also seen as important. António Enes was appointed comissário régio or "royal commissioner", with full civil and military powers to lead an expedition that would pacify the region. Enes informed the government that it would be easy to quell the rebellion, but before leaving Lisbon he warned that it would be necessary to organise a second expedition to annex the Vátua Empire, as reports from Mozambique indicated that Gungunhana was gathering troops to attack Portuguese territory. Some argued for the establishment of a protectorate over Gungunhana, but this was not the policy advocated by Enes, the military, and the Portuguese government.

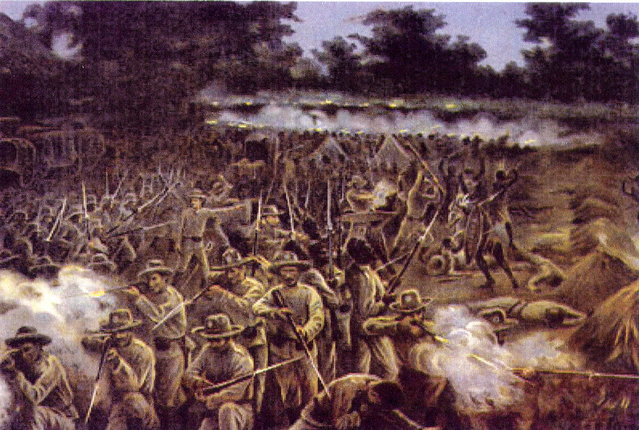
The Battle of Marracuene.

For the Marracuene campaign, 782 men left Lourenço Marques at 5 a.m., at the sound of the national anthem and cheered on by civilians. On the night from 1 to 2 February 1895, Portuguese troops camped in a square formation in the savannah north of Lourenço Marques. Towards morning, the Angolan soldiers of the 3rd Caçadores Battalion thought they recognized a missing patrol but they were suddenly attacked by Tsonga rebels who wore the missing patrolsmens uniforms. As the Angolans were pushed back, bands of rebels who were in hiding charged to break into the square and hand-to-hand combat ensued until the gap in the square was plugged and all rebels inside were neutralized one by one. At the Battle of Marracuene on 2 February 1895, the Portuguese faced 3,000-4,000 Tsongas commanded by Matibejana Zixaxa, who were routed by 6 a.m. due to the superior firepower of the Portuguese, armed with machine guns and cannon. The combat lasted half an hour. Nevertheless, the Portuguese acknowledged they had only barely avoided a disaster.

Despite the victory, heavy rain prevented the crossing of the river and the Portuguese troops were ordered to return to Lourenço Marques. After the battle however, the Tsonga kings who had until then remained neutral in the conflict began actively supporting the Portuguese against the rebels and attacked them, causing them heavy losses in an ambush. The effective demonstration of their firepower had won the Portuguese allies. From that moment on, the rebel Tsonga population migrated north and sought refuge within the Gaza Empire. Gungunhana welcomed the refugee tribes and accepted the vassalage of their leaders, as well as that of the Matabele after their defeat at Lobengula.

== The Gaza Campaign ==
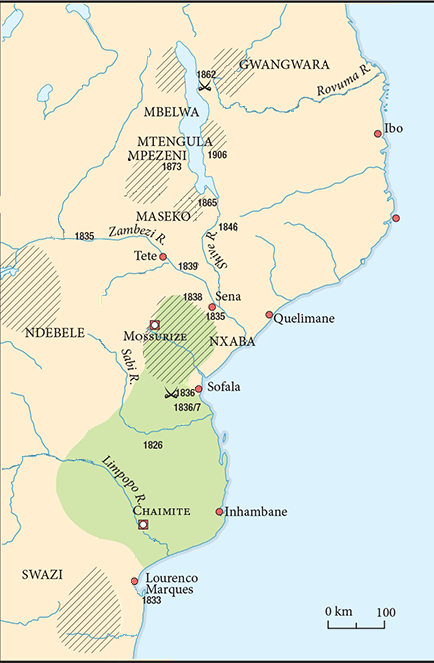
Mozambique and the Gaza Empire.

After the Battle of Marracuene, António Enes decided to annex the Gaza Empire and address the shortcomings exposed during the campaign. He dispatched officers to South Africa to purchase boats, carts and pack animals from the English or Boers in order to improve logistics by land or river. Steam-boats were purchased to German ships that docked at Lourenço Marques, to travel up the Incomati and Limpopo rivers. From Lisbon equipment never before seen in Mozambique arrived: a heliograph, searchlights, pontoon material and electric detonators for mines.

Rebel lands were largely abandoned by the indigenous population. They were reoccupied and new military posts were built on the islands of Xefina Grande and Xefina Pequena, at Marracuene, Benguelene Island and Incanine, where a pontoon bridge was built. With the support of loyal kings and their troops, the terrain was explored and the few groups of warriors who had not yet left for the north with their tribes were cornered.

=== Preparations for the campaign ===
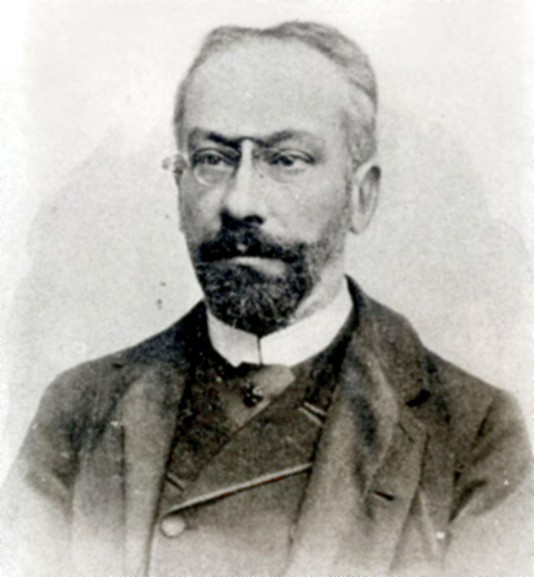
Royal commissioner António Enes.

António Enes planned the campaign in April: the main Portuguese column would be transported to Inhambane and from there it would proceed to Manjacaze, the Vatua capital, while another column would head north from Lourenço Marques to pursue the rebel Tsonga kings. In Limpopo, in the middle, a river squadron would act as a diversion and prevent any hostile warriors from crossing. In 9 months, Portugal assembled a total of 2,600 soldiers in Mozambique for a campaign in unfamiliar territory and against an adversary who openly boasted of being able to assemble 60,000 warriors. For this reason, more limited objectives were officially set, which included the establishment of military posts on the border with Gaza, though António Enes did not rule out the possibility of annexing Gaza or, at least, reducing Gungunhana to a protectorate if the opportunity arose. He also intended to show to other European powers that Portugal had the capacity to impose its authority over the claimed territories.

António Enes sent conselheiro José de Almeida to negotiate with Gungunhana, but he made no attempt to reach an agreement. Gungunhana, on his part, intended to drag out negotiations until the monsoon season. Negotiations were long and marked by several incidents, but the Portuguese bought long months to move troops and equipment without suffering attacks.

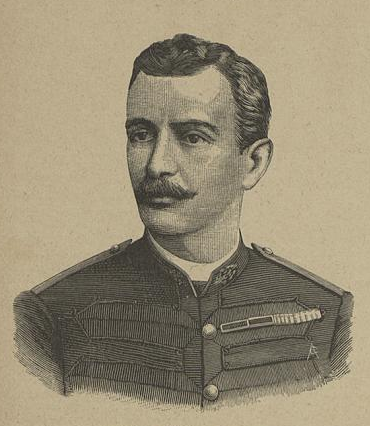
Major Caldas Xavier.

Come May 1895, the Southern Column, commanded by Caldas Xavier, left Lourenço Marques with orders to establish several military posts. On 18 June, it began building a 92 km road from Pasene to Stokolo. At the same time, the Eastern Component of the Southern Column, commanded by Freire de Andrade, began its journey up the Marracuene River to Manhissa, where it was to establish a post and open a path to Stokolo. On 10 July, part of the Stokolo garrison advanced to the left bank of the Incomati and erected Post X there. The Eastern Column left Manhissa on 10 July, transported by the steam boats Bacamarte, Chefina and Magaia, and landed at Chinavane, where it built another post. On 31 July, the Dom Afonso Bridge over the Incomati River was inaugurated. Another was built at Xinavane. By August, the Southern Column was in position. The Portuguese established friendly relations with king Chonguela Manavi, who controlled the territories neighbouring Post X, crossed the Incomati to Cossine and erected a new post at Magude. Several kings who were vassals of Gungunhana then switched to the Portuguese side.

=== The Battle of Magul ===
On 23 August, António Enes broke off negotiations with Gungunhana and ordered Portuguese troops to cross into Gaza and pursue the rebel chiefs who had taken refuge in the region of Cossine. Freire de Andrade summoned the loyal chiefs and, on 3 September, crossed the Dom Afonso Bridge with 10 horsemen, 120 soldiers with a Nordenfelt machine gun, 25 Angolan soldiers and 1,000 African auxiliaries.

A large number of warriors were sighted in Magul, commanded by Matibejana, Magaia, Magioli and Chonguela Manavi, but the auxiliaries of the Portuguese refused to advance into battle. The Portuguese retreated to Xinavane to wait for reinforcements, which arrived on 5 November. The auxiliaries were sent to attack the unguarded lands of the chiefs, and the column left Xinavane again, numbering 275 Europeans, 32 Angolans and four Nordenfelt guns. Transport was lacking, but the enthusiasm and high morale of the Portuguese drove them into battle.

The Portuguese crossed the Xinavane bridge at dawn and then crossed the Incoloane river at a ford, near which a makeshift military post was set up, defended by 28 soldiers. The column then continued for a few kilometres and set up camp at the beginning of the Magul plain, and extra watches were enforced at night.

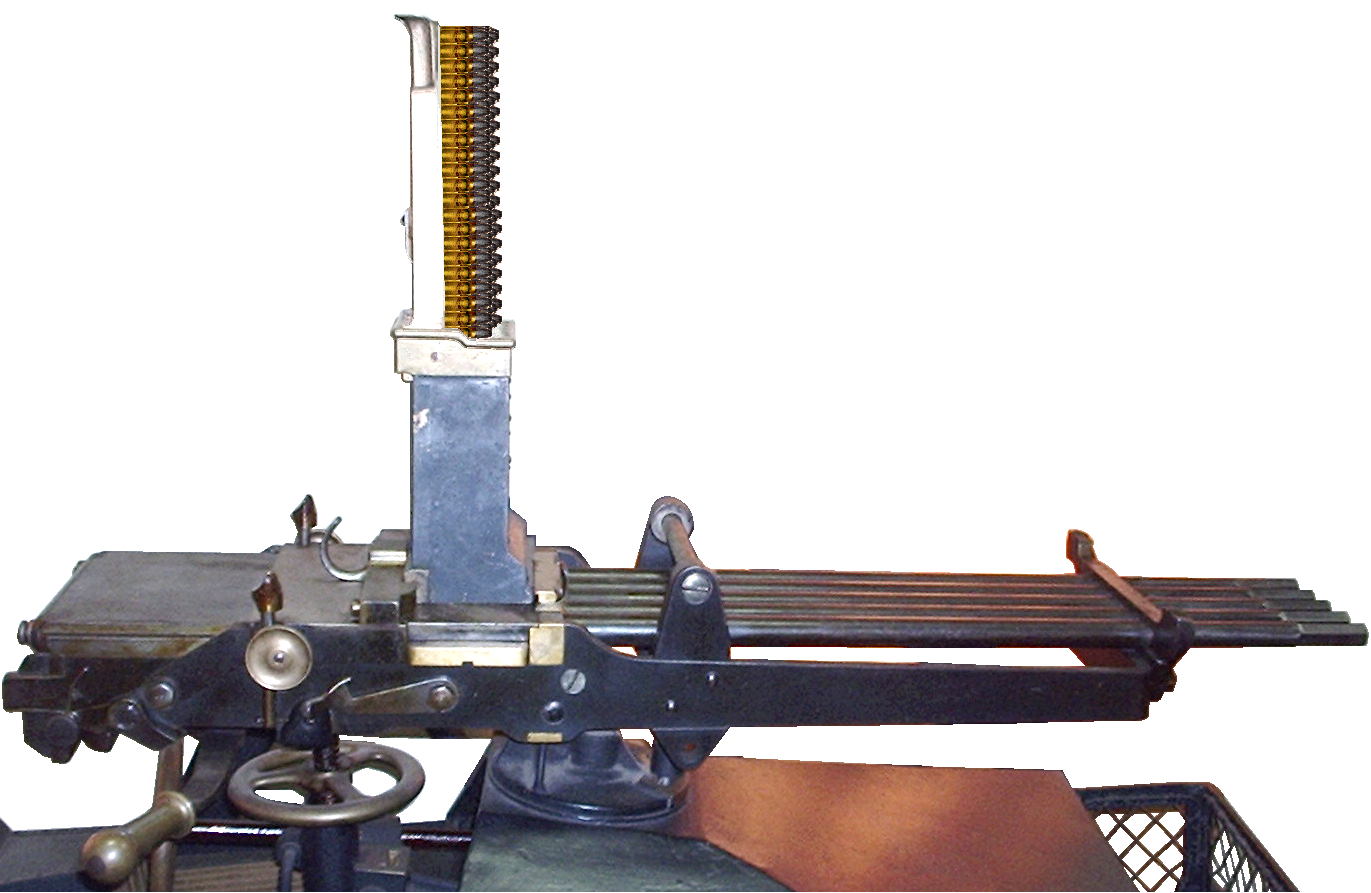
Multi-barreled Nordenfelt gun, widely employed by Portuguese forces in Africa before Maxim guns became available.

The Portuguese continued the march at 7:30 a.m. on 8 September, and a few hours later the cavalrymen riding ahead spotted the enemy warriors. Alarm was sounded, and at 10:30 a.m., the Portuguese formed a fortified infantry square, complete with trenches and barbed wire, perhaps the first time this item was employed in warfare, but several hours then elapsed, as the African warriors remained far-away under the shade of trees, showing no signs of wanting to attack. Freire de Andrade ordered a detachment of 32 Angolans to advance and provoke them, and the warriors came out to surround the square, numbering 13 mangas or detachments, totalling 6,000 to 9,000 warriors, though they remained outside of firing range of the Portuguese. Around midday, the European soldiers began to suffer heat-strokes under the scorching sun. The Portuguese were unable to receive water or food, but by around 1:20 p.m., the Africans attacked the infantry square, starting with their riflemen, armed with flintlock rifles, but also Martini-Henry and Snider–Enfield rifles. The Nordenfelt machine guns were the first to open fire but they quickly jammed; the Portuguese made up for their loss with volleys of rifle fire, which Portuguese officers considered to suffice against the Africans. The Africans came within 60 metres of the machine guns but retreated. The Portuguese suffered 5 dead and 26 wounded, while the Africans left behind more than 300 dead.

From Magul, the Portuguese withdrew to Xinavane, and from there the wounded were evacuated to Lourenço Marques by river. The Portuguese were welcomed by the populations of the regions they passed through. Demoralisation set in among the rebel chiefs, as they had gambled everything on Magul and lost their best leaders along with hundreds of warriors. On 20 September, Chonguela Manavi, chief of Cossine, and nine other chiefs presented themselves at the Magude military post to submit. They were followed by other chiefs in a region stretching as far as Limpopo.

=== Operations on the Limpopo ===
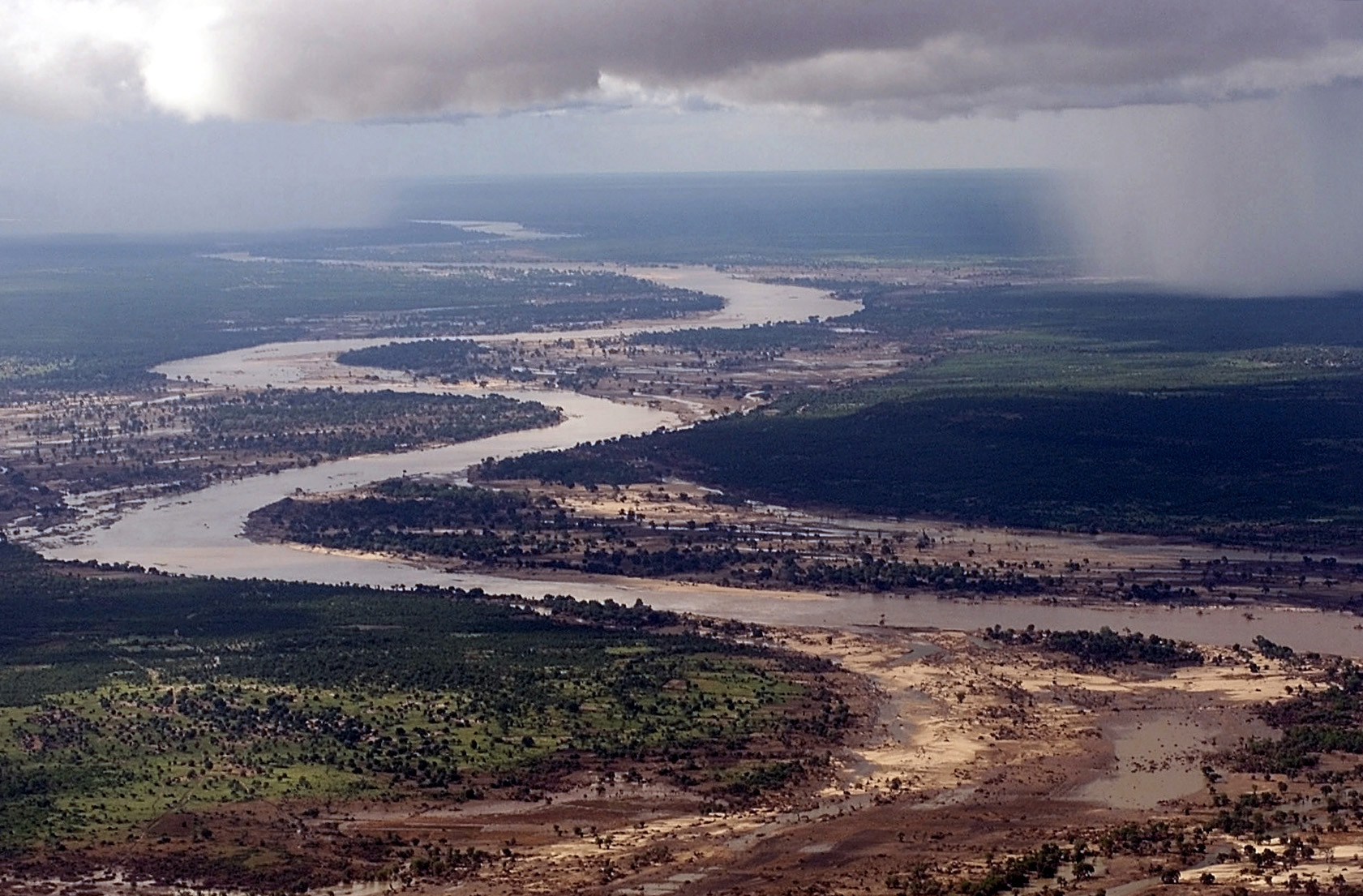
The Limpopo river.

In October, a naval squadron embarked on the gunboat Capelo and the steamships Neves Ferreira, Fox and Carnarvon sailed up the Limpopo River and attacked the surrounding villages in an effort to force the chiefs to abandon Gungunhana's side and hand over the rebel rulers. On 22 October, numerous chiefs from the Xai-Xai region and the upper Limpopo acknowledged Portuguese authority. A detachment of Gungunhana's warriors was sent to the region to re-establish his authority, but near the banks of the river they were dispersed by machine-gun fire from the Capelo.

=== The Battle of Coolela ===
While the Southern Column headed for Limpopo, the Northern Column commanded by Colonel Eduardo Galhardo left Lourenço Marques by sea and landed on Inhambane on 3 June. From there, Galhardos 1,200 men began the march to Chicomo, a few dozen kilometres from Manjacaze, the capital of Gungunhana, and an infantry company was stationed there with an artillery section. However, the road was sandy, the climate harsh, and there were serious logistical and sanitary deficiencies. Colonel Galhardo showed little initiative, and as a result, the Northern Column suffered a large number of casualties due to disease.

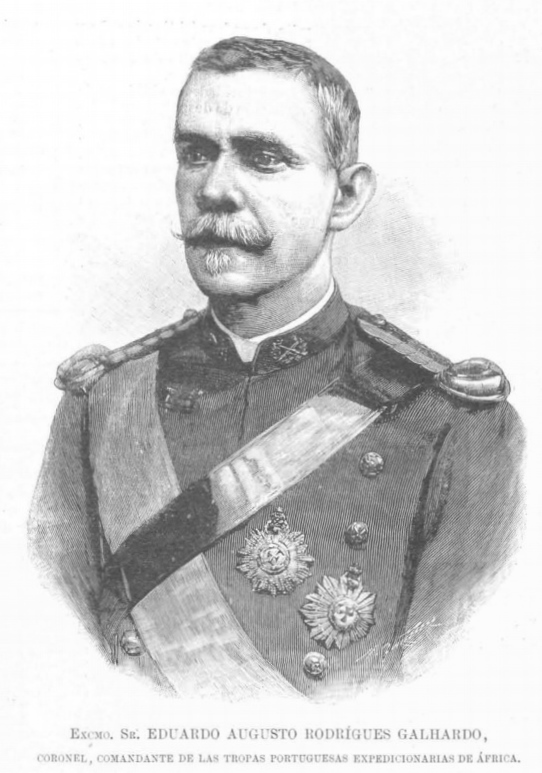
Colonel Eduardo Galhardo.

While in Chicomo, Portuguese detachments raided the surrounding villages. Meanwhile, Gungunhana dispatched emissaries to Pretoria, Natal and Cape Town in September 1895, in a last-ditch attempt to secure protection or an alliance against the Portuguese, but they came back empty handed. Until the very end of his reign, Gungunhana apparently believed he could prevent the Portuguese conquest by bluffs, threats or alliances with other white nations.

The Northern Column advanced towards Manjacaze only on 4 November, by which point European troops had been reduced by half due to disease or desertion, while only a fifth of the 2,700 African auxiliaries remained. After three days of marching, the Column camped on the banks of Lake Coolela and, in the early hours of 7 November, Gungunhana's army was sighted no more than 250 metres from the Portuguese square, approaching rapidly.

The Vatua army was commanded by king Mahougné and its forces were estimated at between 8,000 and 20,000 men, many armed with rifles. However, Gungunhana's prestige was already in decline at that time, his most experienced general had refused to take part in the battle, and the emperor had only managed to gather a maximum of one third of the warriors he could theoretically mobilise.

The front of the Portuguese infantry square was attacked by the centre of the Vatua army and the Portuguese opened fire, which was initially disorganized but gradually became more regular as Colonel Galhardo rode through the ranks on horseback, instilling discipline while smoking a cigar at the same time. When the order was given to cease fire to allow the smoke to dissipate, two of the closest mangas of the Vatuas, the 'Buffalos' and 'Alligators', attacked the left flank in force, believing that the Portuguese hesitating, in a charge that proves suicidal. Forty minutes after the battle had begun, the Vatuas retreated, pursued by the African auxiliaries of the Portuguese. The Portuguese suffered 5 dead and 33 wounded, while Vatua casualties were estimated at 600 to 1,500. Galhardo thought that the battle resembled a "cotillion"

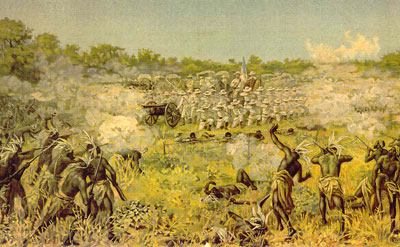
The Battle of Coolela.

At the Battle of Coolela, five-eighths of the Vatu troops were actually Chope, Tonga or Ndao vassals who were unwilling to die for Gungunhana. After the battle, Gungunhana's army dispersed and the Vatu emperor fled to an unknown location. However, it was not until four days later that Colonel Galhardo ordered an advance on the royal capital of Manjacaze, which was found abandoned and set on fire. On 14 November, the Northern Column returned to Chicomo, where it received several chiefs who submitted.

=== The capture of Gungunhana ===
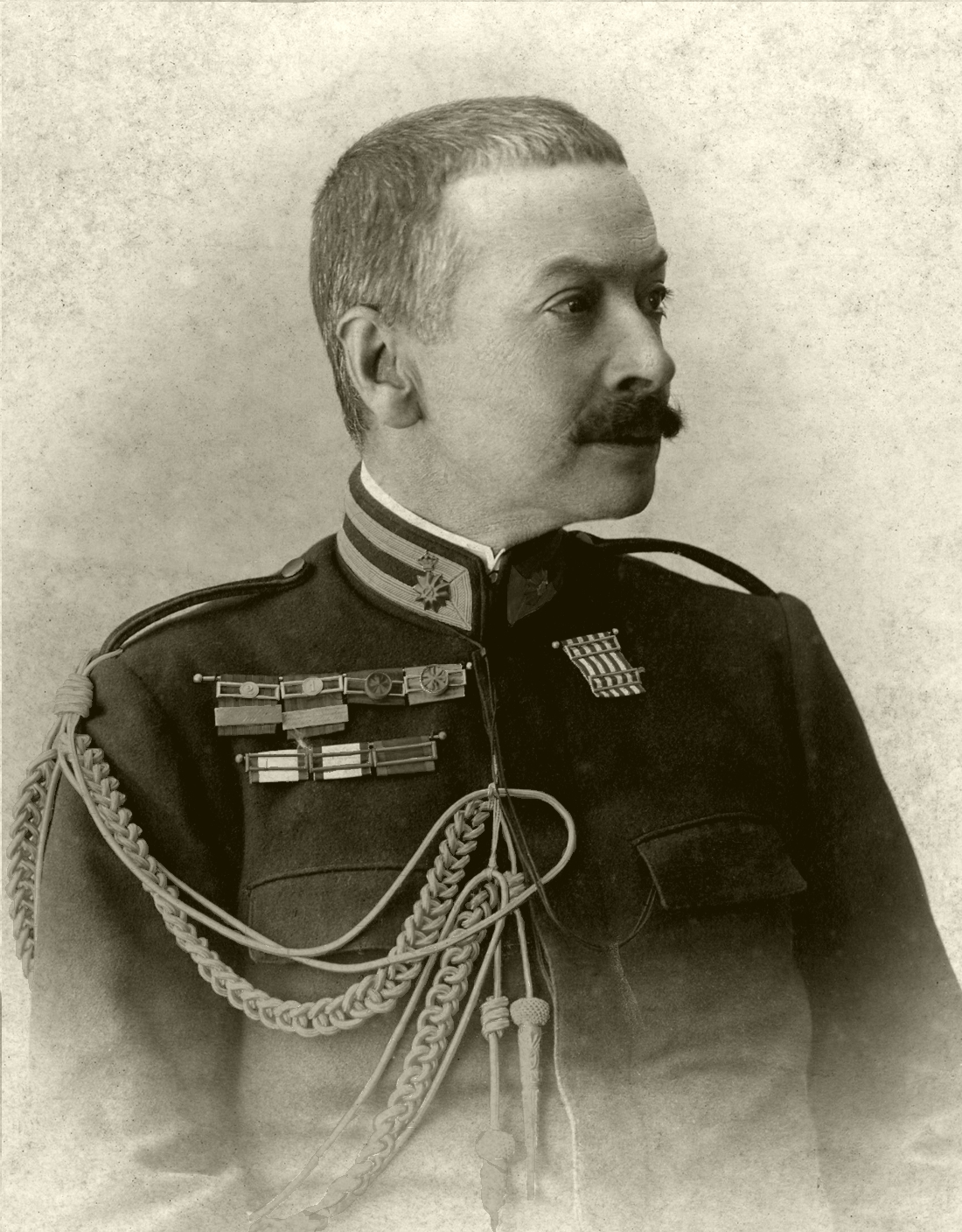
Mouzinho de Albuquerque.

With the power of the Vatua practically destroyed, Portuguese troops began to return to Portugal and to the post at Languene, the only one established within Gaza territory, 70 miles from the mouth of the Limpopo River, commanded by Lieutenant Sanches de Miranda. Many African kinglets flocked there to pledge their allegiance. The chief of Ximundo informed the Portuguese that Gungunhana was nearby, at Chaimite, accompanied by only 200 followers. On 13 December, Lieutenant Sanches finally received the rebel king Matibejana in Languene, sent as a sign of good faith by Gungunhana, who thus asked for peace.

Meanwhile, on 15 December, António Enes created the Military District of Gaza, subject to a special status until the territory was fully pacified. Mouzinho de Albuquerque, a cavalry officer who had distinguished himself in the Coolela campaign was appointed military governor of Gaza. Upon learning that Matibejana had been delivered and that Gungunhana was near Languene, Mouzinho de Albuquerque set out determined to capture the Vátua emperor.

From Languene, the Capelo was sent upstream on 25 December, with Lieutenant Miranda, a doctor and European soldiers, while Mouzinho de Albuquerque left the following day with an improvised force of 207 auxiliaries and 76 porters. At 4 pm that day, they camped at Zamacaze, where Capelo was anchored, near the junction of the Limpopo and Changane rivers. Gungunhana learnt of the departure of the Portuguese column and sent emissaries with gifts, 560 pounds of gold and ivory, to negotiate with Mouzinho de Albuquerque. At 2:30 a.m. the following day December 26, Mouzinho de Albuquerque continued the march, now accompanied only by 47 Europeans and 200 auxiliaries. After 9 hours of forced march, the column camped near the Motacame lagoon, where they received a delegation from Gungunhana headed by his son Godide, with considerable gifts, 510 pounds of gold and 63 buffalo. At 4 a.m. the following morning, December 27, Mouzinho de Albuquerque resumed the march and on the way they were met by three Vatua detachments who informed him that Gungunhana was nearby in Chaimite.

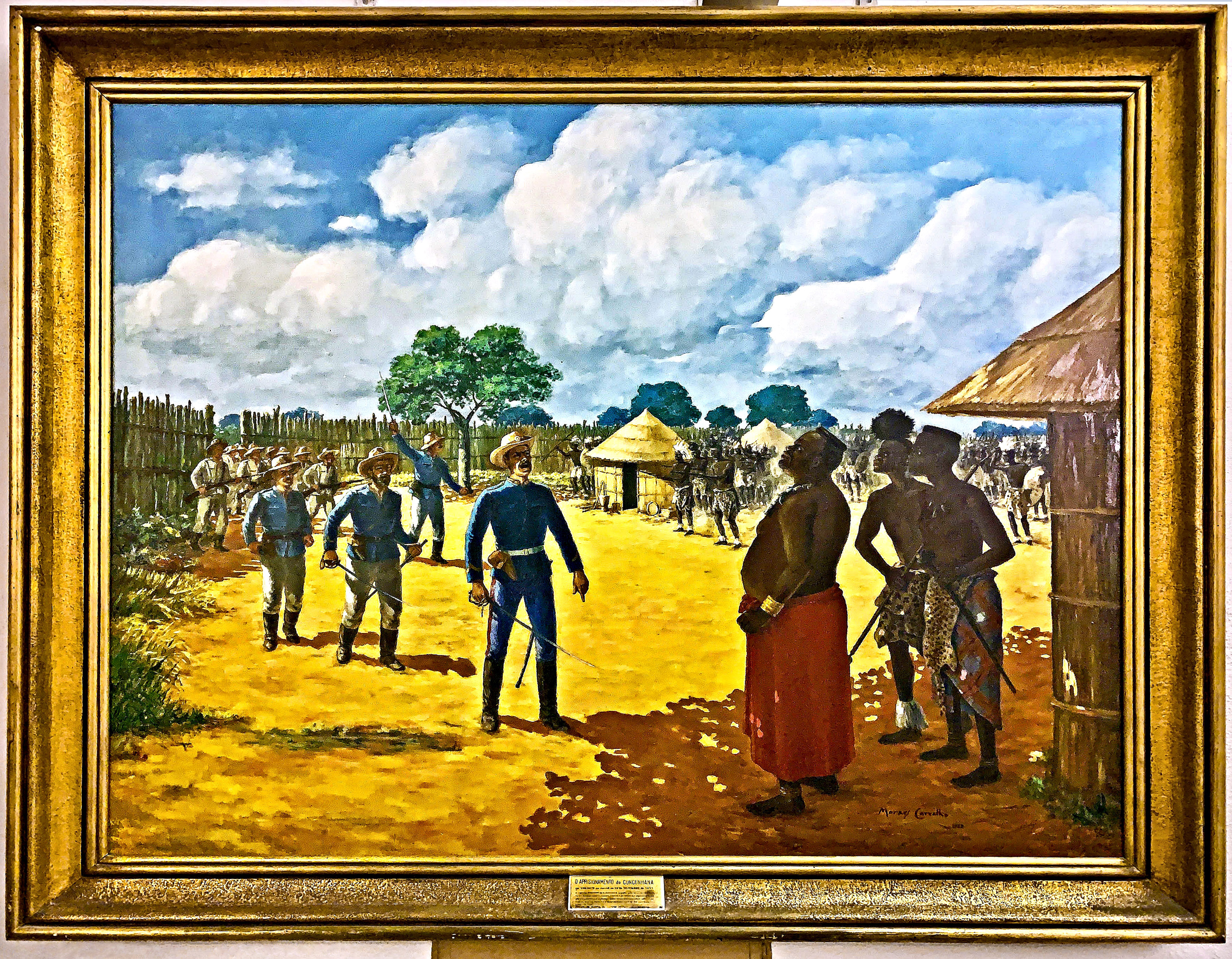
The capture of Gungunhana. Painting at the Military Museum of Lisbon.

At 6:30, Mouzinho de Albuquerque, the Portuguese, the auxiliaries and the Vatuas who had meanwhile submitted themselves reached Chaimite, a circular palisaded settlement with 30 huts. Albuquerque ordered the auxiliaries to surround the settlement, while he entered accompanied by the Portuguese, sword in hand. The residents of the kraal, although armed, offered no resistance. Mouzinho de Albuquerque met Gungunhana in front of his hut, tied his hands and forced him to sit on the ground, officially deposing him to the cheers of the auxiliaries and even some vátuas who had submitted to Portugal.

== Aftermath ==
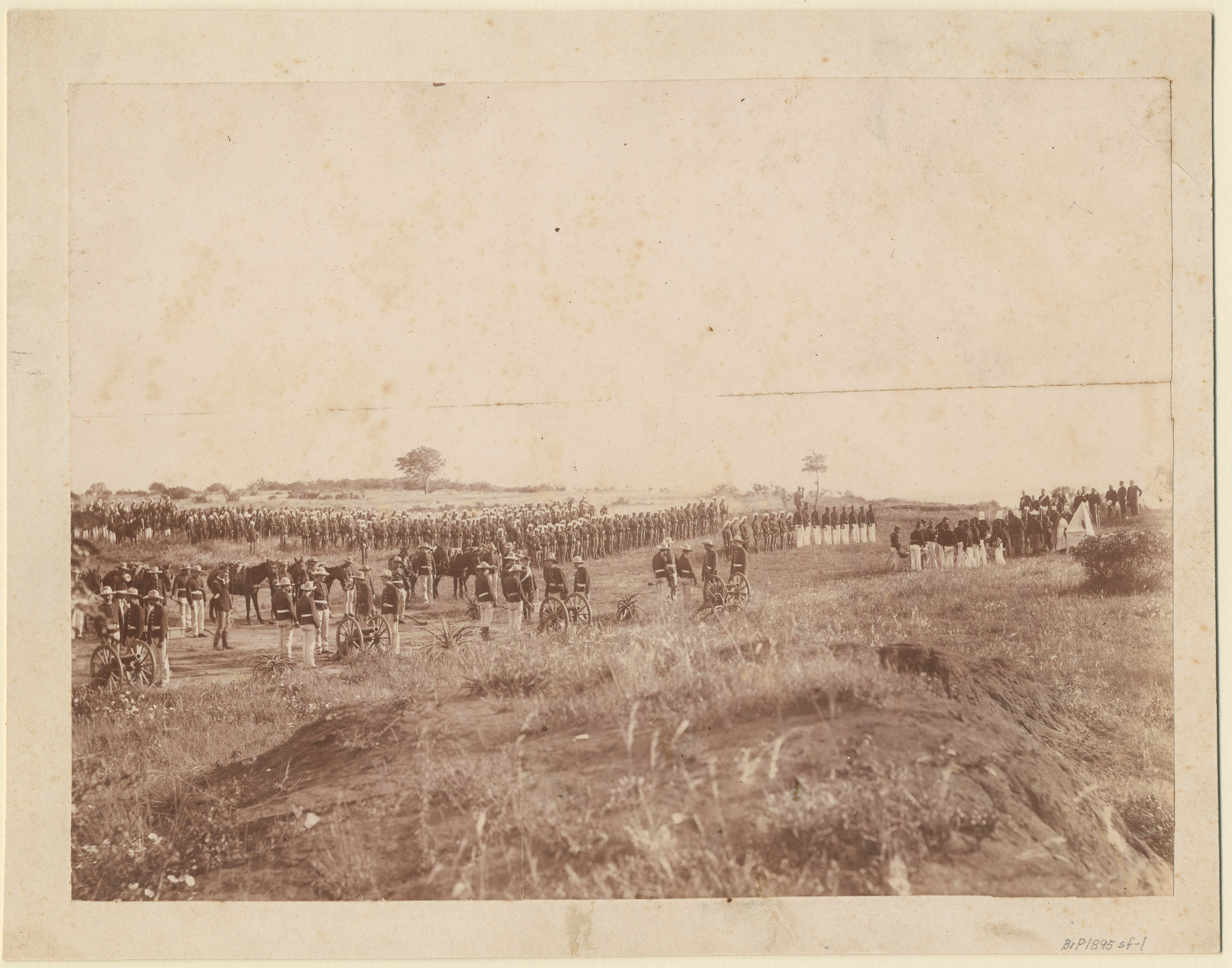
1895 photograph of a field mass at Ponta Vermelha, near Lourenço Marques, attended by the Portuguese army, celebrated in gratitude for the pacification of the Gaza Empire.

Immediately after the capture of Gungunhana, Mouzinho de Albuquerque found Mahune, one of Gungunhanas main advisors, and Queto, Mahunes uncle, guilty of instigating the Tsonga rebellion, and had them executed by firing squad.

The end of the Vatua monarchy was not unpopular among the subjugated populations of Gaza, and when Gungunhana was taken away by Mouzinho de Albuquerque's troops, the population would shout out with you vulture, murderer of our chickens. Gungunhana was transported along with his closest family members first to Lourenço Marques and from there to Lisbon, where they arrived on 13 March 1896. They were then exiled to the Azores, where Gungunhana died in 1906. Matibejana Zixaxa would die in 1927 and left descendants. The expeditionaries arrived in Lisbon in January 1896 and were afforded a triumpant reception by the population. The troops of the 3rd Caçadores Battalion received a similar welcome in Porto and Bragança. Mouzinho de Albuquerque was also received with major honours, even touring the country.

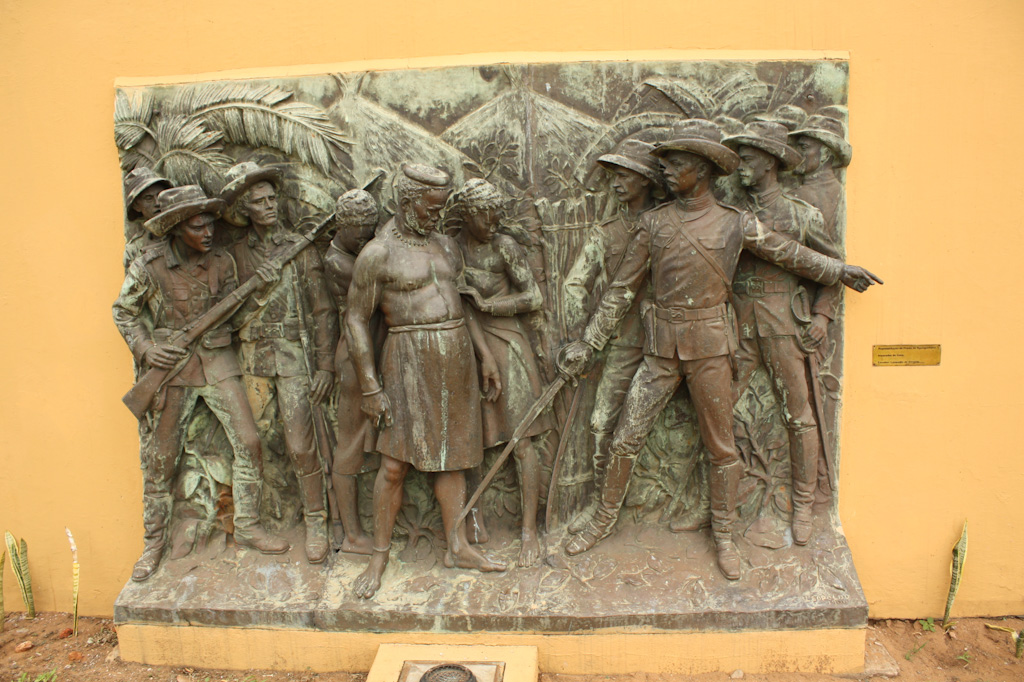
Bronze relief of the capture of Gungunhana by Mouzinho de Albuquerque.

Enes' decision to advance against Gaza had been considered reckless by foreign observers at the time, and the US consul in Mozambique at first refused to believe Gungunhana had been beaten. Portuguese troops fulfilled all objectives in the Gaza campaign even though they fought with scant means, while Enes faced logistical problems that were by then quite unusual among European powers in Africa. In his own writings he reflected:

Today colonial wars, even more than wars in Europe, are carried on with material well-chosen [...] even luxurious, satisfying all requirements and minimizing inconveniences. The Portuguese of 1895, however, encamped and fought [...] with scanty matériel almost as primitive as that which their rude ancestors employed in the conquest of the Indies and the exploration of Africa in the fifteenth and sixteenth centuries. [...] Transport, alike of food and munitions, of ambulances and wounded, was by means of wattle-and-mud carts drawn by slow-moving oxen; for tent or shelter there was the starry sky, or a hut in the bush – or, if the ground were damp, one found a bed of branches, a stretcher, or a hammock; for carrying rations, the iron pots used by the Kaffirs, and in place of sanitary and comfortable mobile infirmaries, huts made of straw and banana leaves [...] while as for rations [...] their principal feature, for soldiers subjected to temperatures in excess of fifty degrees centigrade, were the classic macaroni and chick-peas, seasoned with paprika! [...] Nowadays, no one makes war in this way except ourselves and, perhaps, the Spaniards.

The campaigns of 1894 and 1895 involved 14% of the total strength of the Portuguese home army in peacetime. They ensured the occupation of southern Mozambique, raised the prestige of the Portuguese armed forces, formed a generation of Africanists and renewed Portuguese involvement in Africa at a time of international turbulence.

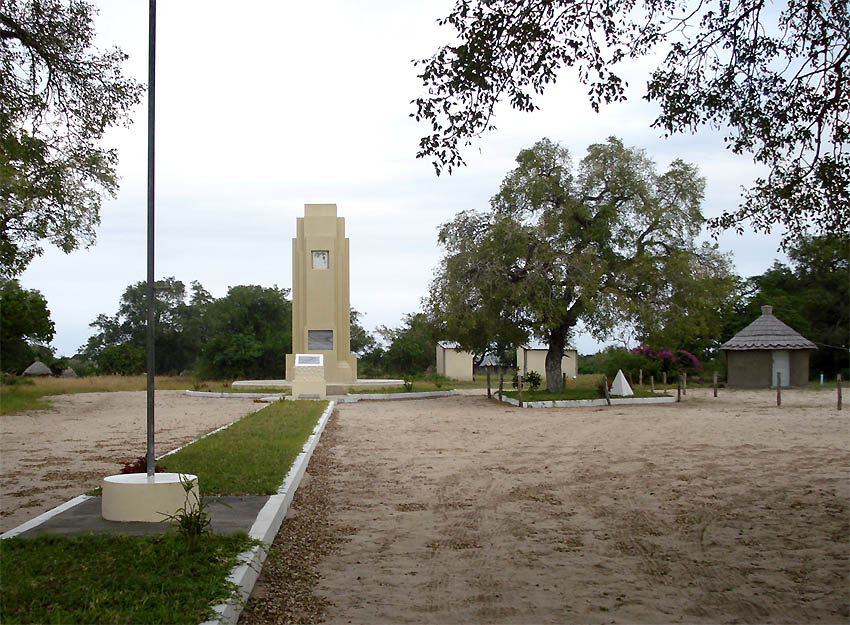
Monument to Gungunhana in Chaimite, alongside a pyramid marker indicating the place where the Vatua emperor was captured.

With the south pacified and Gaza occupied, new campaigns followed in central and northern Mozambique. After Gungunhana's exile, Gaza went through a period of instability due to the loss of lives, property and cattle plague. One of Gungunhanas war-chief Maguiguana led a revolt against Portuguese authority to restore the power of the Vatua but was defeated at the Battle of Macontene in July 1897. The defeat and death of Maguiguana made final the transfer of sovereignty over Gaza to Portugal.

In June 1985, the presidents of Portugal and Mozambique agreed to transfer the remains of Gungunhana to Maputo, where he was re-buried, at the 18th century Portuguese fortress outside the city.

== See also ==
- Anglo-Zulu War
- First Matabele War
- Portuguese conquest of Barue
- Maputo campaign

== Bibliography ==
- António José Telo (2004). Moçambique - 1895: A Campanha de Todos os Heróis, Tribuna da História.
- Malyn Newitt (1995). A History of Mozambique, Indiana University Press.
- Bruce Vandervort (2006). Wars of Imperial Conquest in Africa 1830-1914, Taylor & Francis.
