= Mawewe =

Monach of the Gaza empire

- King of the Gaza Empire
- Reign: c. 1859 – c. 1862
- Predecessor: King Soshangane Nxumalo
- Successor: King Mzila Nxumalo
- Born: Gaza Empire
- Died: Eswatini
- House: Nxumalo
- Father: King Soshangane Nxumalo

Mawewe, or Maueva, was king of the Gaza Empire in 1859.

He was the son of king Soshangane Nxumalo and was born to a Swati woman whom King Soshangane had married. Mawewe felt that since he was older than his half brother, Mzila of a (Tsonga) mother, that he should be king of Gaza. After the death of King Soshangane, Mawewe began to attack his brothers, including Mzila. Mzila fled and made his way to the Transvaal in 1859 to seek help to fight his brother. Mawewe was hostile to the Portuguese and wanted them out of Gaza territory. Mostly Vatsonga youths were used in his army, as his father King Soshangane did. Mawewe's reputation was that of expansionism. Most other clans and tribes were attacked or slaughtered, and people ran to Mzila. When Mzila returned, he had help from the Portuguese to fight Mawewe's army. Mzila managed to defeat his brother, despite Mawewe having a large and experienced army. Mawewe made his way to Eswatini to seek for new beginnings. He used the surname Mkhatshwa, which most of his descendants still use today.
