= Battle of Marracuene =

1895 battle in Mozambique

- Part of Campaigns of Pacification and Occupation
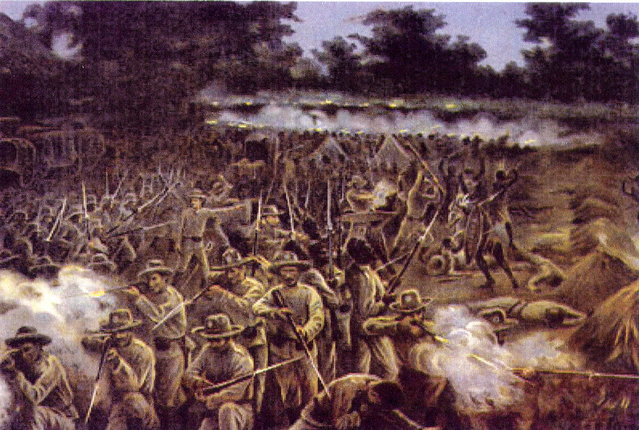
- Painting of the Battle
Date	February 2, 1895
Location	Marracuene, Portuguese Mozambique
Result	Portuguese victory

Belligerents
Kingdom of Portugal	Ronga forces

Commanders and leaders
António Enes	Zixaxa

Strength
2,000 soldiers	2,000 soldiers

The Battle of Marracuene (Portuguese: Combate de Marracuene), also known as the Battle of Gwaza Muthini, was a military confrontation that was fought on February 2, 1895, near Marracuene, Portuguese Mozambique, between Ronga rebels and Portuguese forces. There were over 2,000 Ronga troops in the conflict. António Enes, the Portuguese Royal Commissioner, assembled over 2,000 European soldiers. The Portuguese, armed with machine guns and repeating rifles, won the confrontation. The date of the battle is celebrated in Mozambique.

== See also ==
- Portuguese conquest of the Gaza Empire
