= Fort Nossa Senhora da Conceição de Lourenço Marques =

Fortress in Maputo, Mozambique

Fort Nossa Senhora da Conceição
- Fortaleza de Nossa Senhora da Conceição
- Maputo in Mozambique
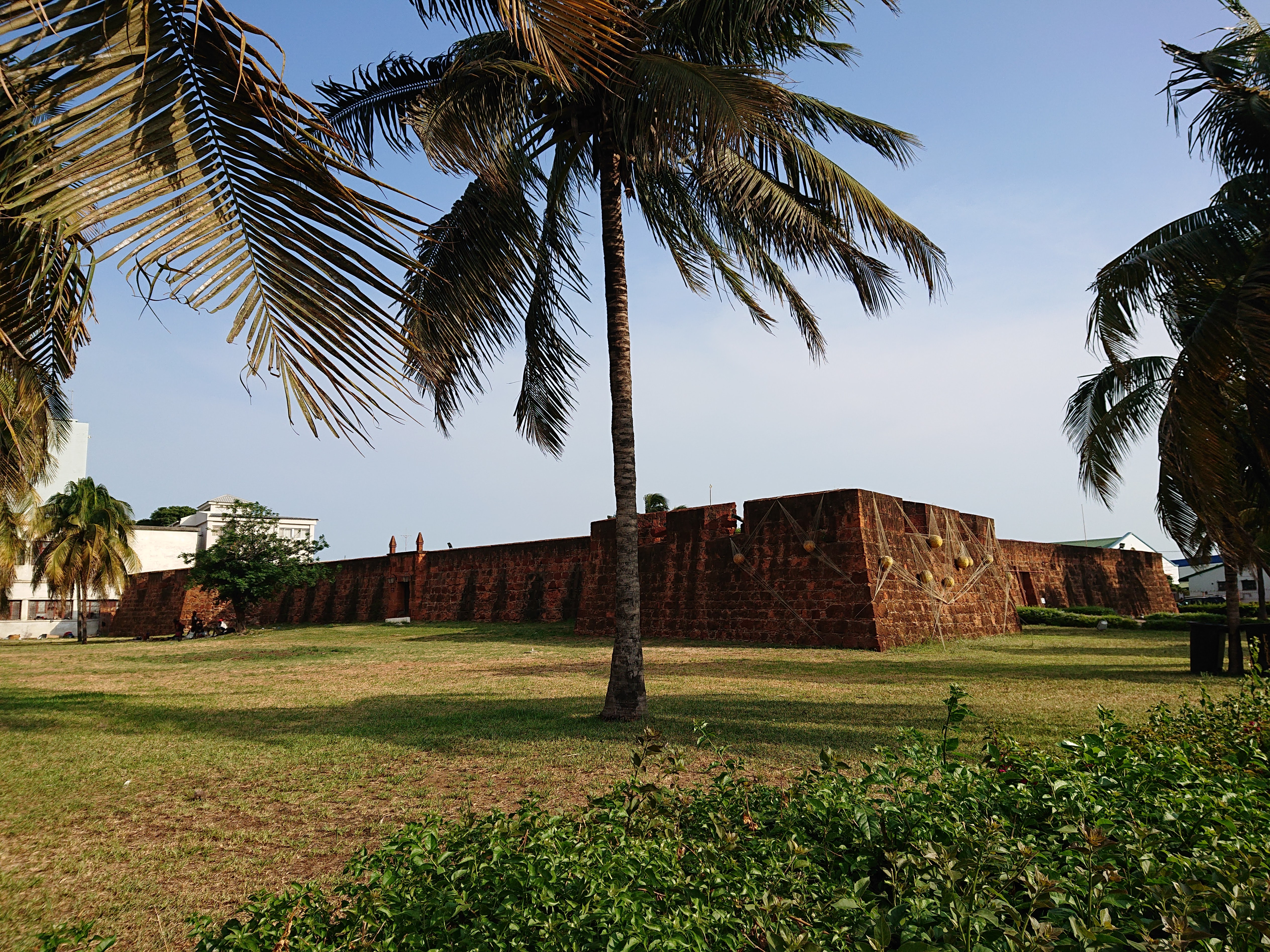

Site information
- Controlled by: Portuguese Empire
- Condition: Good

Location
- Coordinates: 25°58′30″S 32°34′14″E

Site history
- Built: 1782

The Fort Nossa Senhora da Conceição of Lourenço Marques, nowadays known as the Maputo Fortress (Fortaleza de Maputo) is located at Praça 25 de Junho and represents one of the main historical monuments of the city of Maputo, former Lourenço Marques, in Mozambique.

It has a square floor plan, built in reddish stone masonry. It has only one access gate that opens onto a central courtyard, also with a square layout, to which, in turn, the various rooms that make up the building open. In this courtyard currently stands the equestrian statue of Mouzinho de Albuquerque, which, before the Independence of Mozambique, stood in front of the Municipality of Lourenço Marques.

It houses a statue of Mouzinho de Albuquerque. Here also lie the mortal remains of Gungunhana, transferred from Terceira Island, in the Azores, in 1985.

== History ==
=== The Dutch fort ===
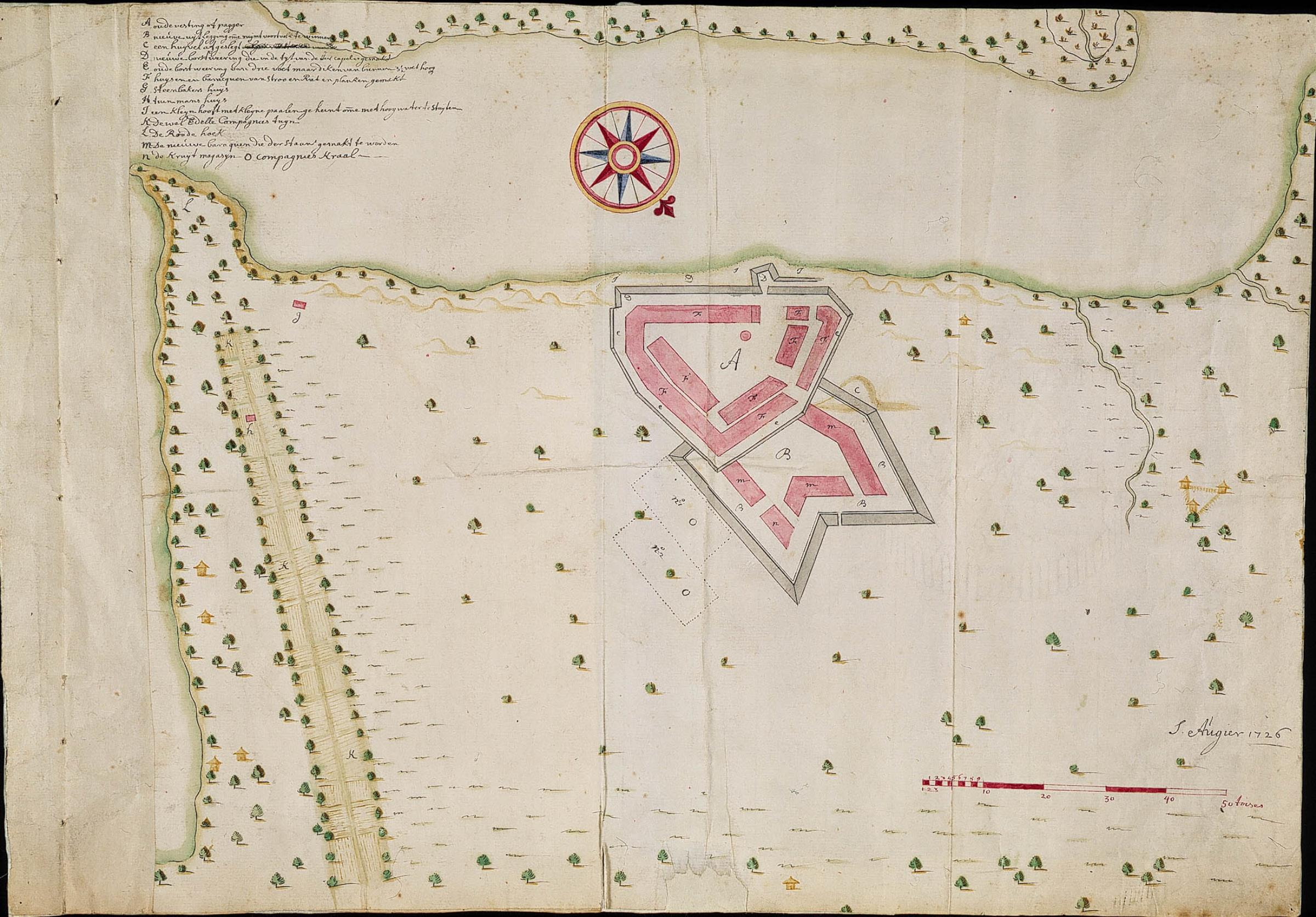
Dutch plan of the fortress at Lagoa River

The original structure on the site was a fortified trading post built about a quarter of a mile from the mouth of the Espírito Santo River by Dutch from Cape Town. The expedition consisted of 113 men, under the command of Klaas Nieuhof, in two ships, the Gouda and the Caap. Having left the Cape on February 19, 1721, they reached Maputo Bay in early April. After obtaining the authorization of the local chief, they started a wooden fort, with a pentagon plan: the Fort Lijdzaamheid. Having suffered all manner of difficulties, in about six months about half of the Europeans had perished, mainly victims of malaria. Even with the arrival of reinforcements from the Cape by the ships Zeelandia and Uno, bringing 72 more men and supplies, the scenario did not change.

On the morning of April 11, 1722, three English pirate ships under the command of Captain George Taylor, operating in the waters of the Mozambique Channel, entered Maputo Bay, pursued by four ships of the English East India Company, the Lion, the Salisbury, the Exeter and the Shoreham.

The pirate vessels were the Victory, with 64 cannons, the Cassandra, with 36, and a French boat captured off the island of Santa Maria. In total, they had a force of 900 men. On April 18, they decided to capture the Dutch trading post, which they bombarded, captured a boat and the ship De Caap, until, at 5 pm, the white flag of surrender was hoisted from the fort.

Knowing that Van de Capelle, the second-in-command, had fled to the interior with eighteen men, the English demanded his immediate return, on pain of razing the establishment to the ground. Without the Dutch returning, the fort and trading post were destroyed by the English, who withdrew two months later, at the end of June.

=== The Austrian Fort ===
Later, a new fortification was built on the site, now by Austrian forces under the command of William Bolts - the São José Fort -, in 1777, being dislodged from there in March 1781, by a Portuguese expedition coming from Goa under the command of Lieutenant-Colonel Joaquim Godinho de Mira, aboard the frigate "Sant'Anna". In the report that this official sent to the Governor of the Portuguese State of India, D. Frederico Guilherme de Sousa, he informs:

(...) on the 30th of the same [March] I entered the Espírito Santo River, having with a lot of drilling work I passed happily among the many lows that the Bahia de Lourenço Marques is full of. Within that river there were three vessels with top-masts: one bearing a Portuguese flag and passport issued by the governor of Daman, José de Oliveira Leitão, another with the English flag, whose owners of the first are from Surat, and Bombay those of the second, finally the third vessel was a pala with a mast and a half, and had an Imperial flag, belonging to the Company of Trieste, between this and a battery of thirteen pieces that was on land with the same Imperial flag, I went to anchor. Instructed, and sent part of it with its competent officers to take possession of the Imperial pala which was anchored, prepared for any resistance made by it, and with orders not to make the least hostility, i this same thing was executed, and the entry was made without the slightest resistance or offense; I left it to be commanded by Lieutenant-Captain Francisco Lobo da Gama with a competent garrison, and I with some troops headed for the land battery (the entrenched camp of S. José), which I entered without resistance, I immediately ordered lower the Imperial flag, and on the following day, April 1, in the morning, hoist the Portuguese flag, saving it with twenty-one gunshots; to this volley the frigate replied with the same number; I immediately ordered the cleaning, dismantled and led the artillery aboard the frigate, demolished the battery, immediately sending the two sea lieutenants Cândido José Mourão Garcez Palha and Christovão da Costa Athaide, aboard the other two vessels that were there.

== The Fort Nossa Senhora da Conceição ==
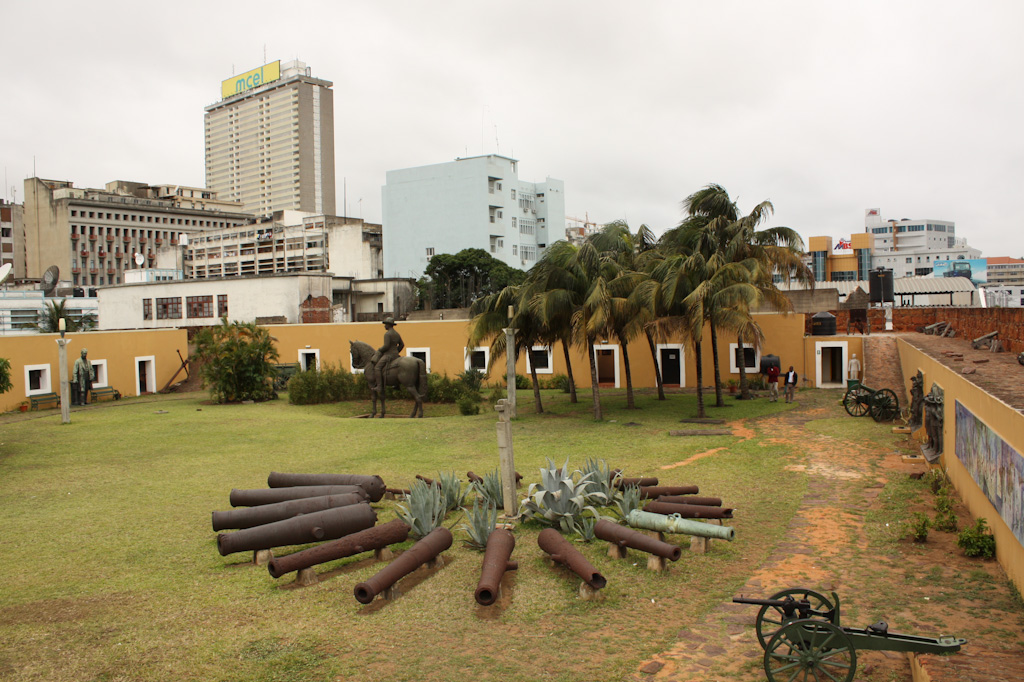
Courtyard of the fort.

With the Austrian position undone, the place was occupied by a Portuguese presídio, under the command of Joaquim de Araújo, who started a new fortification the following year intended to protect the trading post of Lourenço Marques. This establishment, on the left bank of the Espírito Santo River, in the current Baixa de Maputo, was built in faxina (bundled wooden branches) and earth, under the invocation of Nossa Senhora da Conceição ("Forte de Nossa Senhora da Conceição de Lourenço Marques" ).

In a few years, the first stone-and-lime houses began to be built next to the fort, including the famous Casa Amarela, which currently houses the National Currency Museum.

In 1785 the fort was attacked by warriors of the Tembe chiefdom, but were repulsed with aid of the Matola chief.

The fort was later rebuilt by Captain António José Teixeira Tigre, as can be seen from the epigraphic inscription on the site, which reads:

O CAPam DE GRANADros AN / Tº jOZE TEIXra TIGRE CO / MANDANDO ESTAS ILHAS / FEZ ESTA FORTALEZA / NO ANNO DE 1791. ("The Captain of Grenadiers António José Teixeira Tigre, at the command of these islands made this fortress on the year of 1791")

This fortification, with a quadrangular plan surrounded by a moat, had an ephemeral duration, being looted, in the context of the struggles that followed the French Revolution, by three vessels artillery of French corsairs, on October 26, 1796; abandoned by the few men under the command of Governor João da Costa Soares, the small fort was captured and looted.

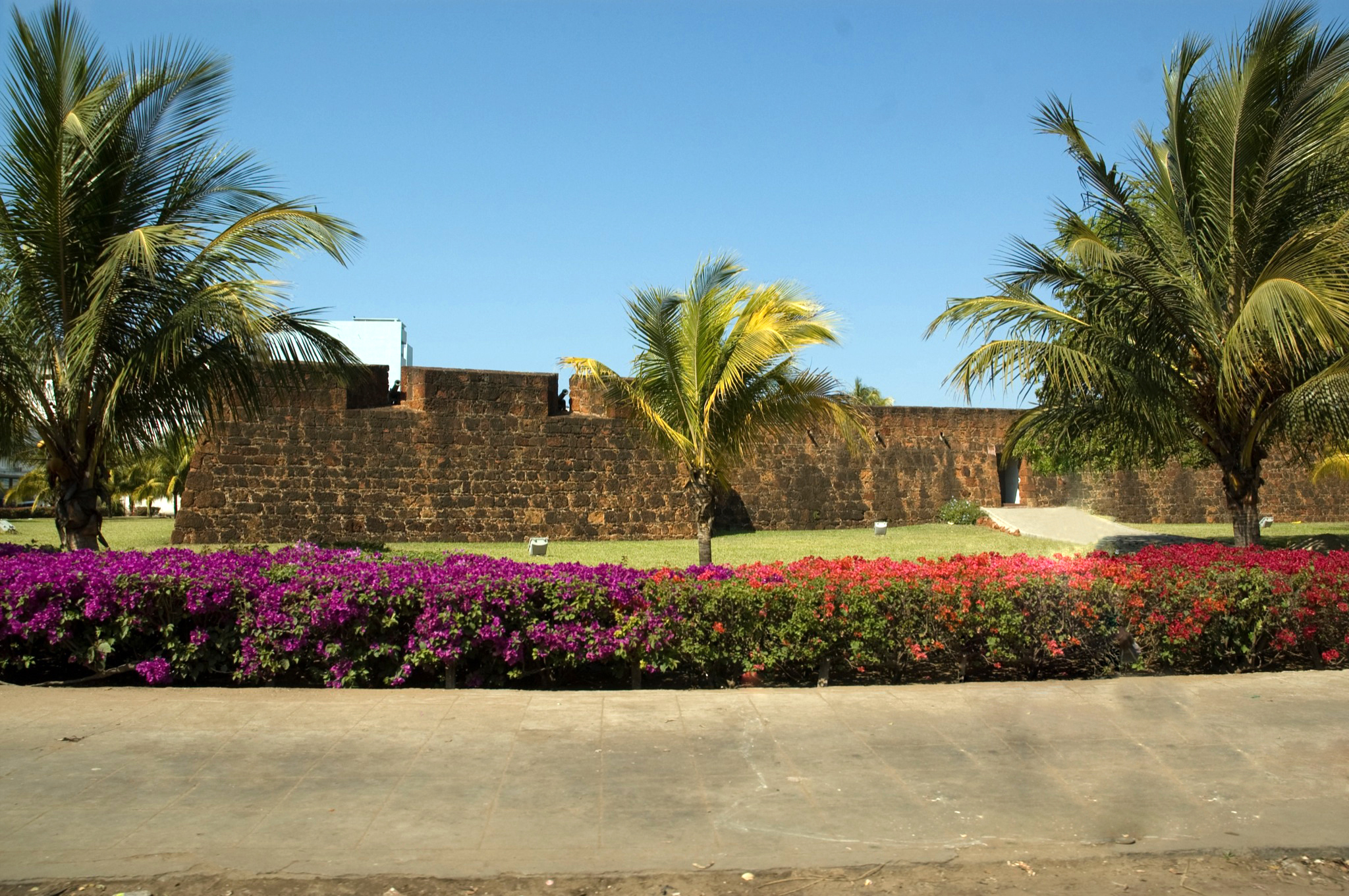
Gateway.

To recover the lost position, a small detachment was sent from the Fortress of São Sebastião under the command of Lieutenant-aide Luís José, aboard the pala Minerva.

Having arrived in Lourenço Marques on June 7, 1799, they settled "in the land of Capella, in front of the old prison, because the chief of Matola did not want to attend to him immediately". There they remained until about 1805, when with relative safety they were able to "pass over to the other side, which had previously been occupied by the Dutch and Austrians." Here he then erected a "small fortified dwelling for troops' barracks and trading post, where the Portuguese flag was flown, as a sign of possession of the land, and with no intention of resisting any enemy". The Governor and Captain General of Mozambique justified the smallness of this establishment "due to lack of resources in the province".

Around 1946, in the context of the Centenary celebrations, the fort was restored over the foundations of the original one, proceeding with the conservation of the existing historical tree next to its Gate of Arms (where, according to tradition, the Vátuas had hanged Governor Dionísio Ribeiro, in 1883) and the requalification of the buildings inside it as the "Historical Museum of Mozambique".

Currently, it houses the Military History Museum, managed by Eduardo Mondlane University.

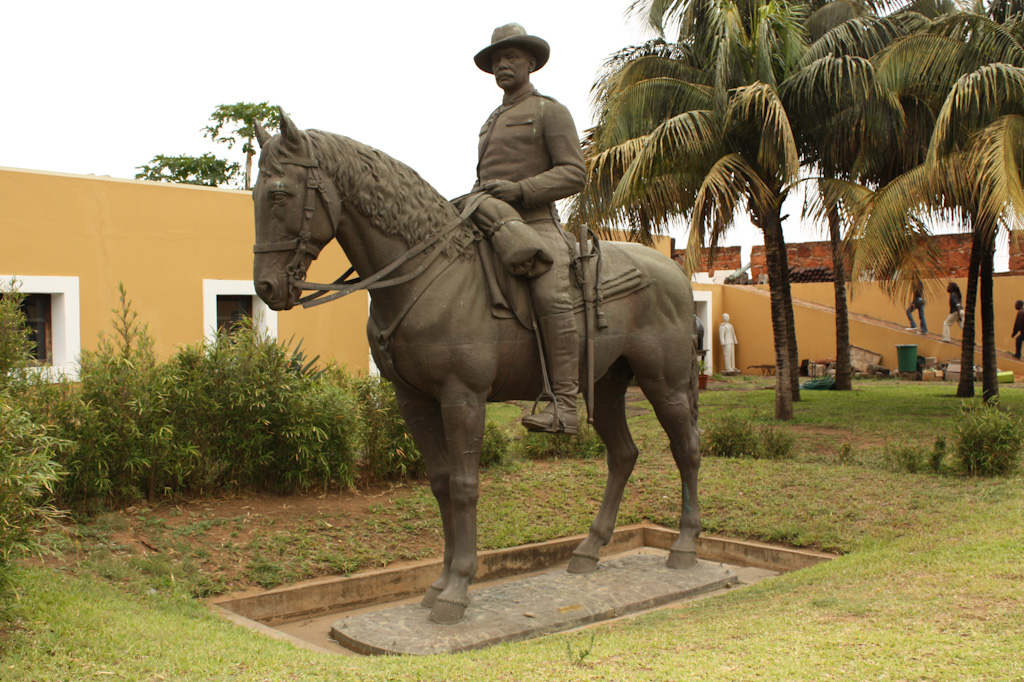
Statue of Mouzinho de Albuquerque.

== See also ==
- Portuguese Mozambique
- History of Maputo
