= António José Enes =

Portuguese politician (1848–1901)

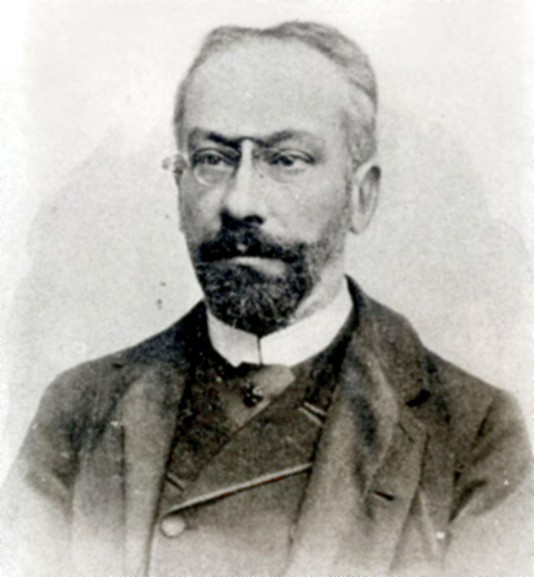
- Born: 15 August 1848; Lisbon, Portugal
- Died: 6 August 1901 (aged 52); Sintra, Portugal
- Occupations: Politician and writer

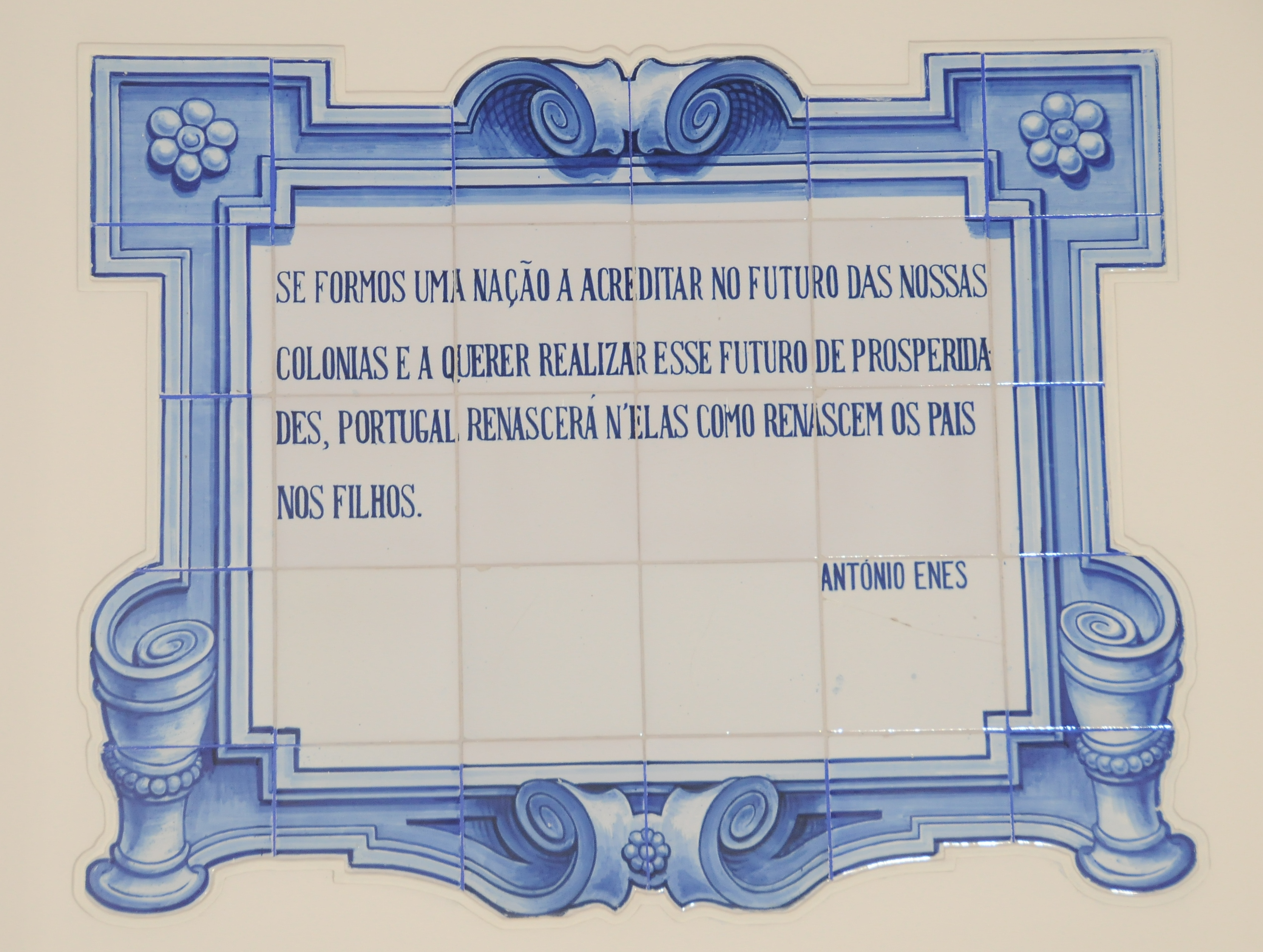
Text by António Enes in azulejos by Jorge Colaço

António José Enes (15 August 1848 – 6 August 1901), commonly known as António Enes, was a Portuguese politician and writer.

A member of the progressive political and 1870s literary movement in Portugal, Enes's life is notable for his achievements in several fields; by the time of his death he had worked across three continents as a journalist, dramatist, librarian, government minister, colonial administrator and diplomat.

Enes wrote a controversial anti-clerical drama, "Os Lazaristas", and defended in 1870 the concept of a 'United States of Europe', fearing that Portugal would be absorbed by Spain.

As a writer, politician, and later as High Commissioner in Portuguese Mozambique, Enes was a defender of Portugal's colonial possessions in Africa in the face of twin threats from an expansionist and aggressive British Empire and native uprisings.

The town of Angoche in Mozambique was in the colonial era renamed 'António Enes' after him: the name of the town reverted to Angoche in 1976 following Portuguese decolonisation.

== Early life ==
António Enes was born, the son of a clerk, in modest surroundings on the third floor of a house in Lisbon. He was a sickly child and health problems were to continue throughout his life. He studied at a Lazarist college in Santo Antão before attending the Liceu Nacional in Lisbon, completing his studies with a thesis in the Faculty of Letters on the Religious Philosophy of Egypt.

As a student Enes became allied with the "generation of the 70s" – the name given to a movement dedicated to political liberalism and realism in art – other prominent members included Eça de Queiroz, Antero de Quental, Batalha Reis and Oliveira Martins. This political and literary affiliation shaped the rest of his career.

Following initially a career in commerce, Enes found that the tranquil life of an office-worker did not suit him and he moved into journalism at the end of the 1860s, beginning his career as a literary critic on the 'Jornal do Comercio.'

== The journalist and young politician ==
Enes became allied with the liberal, republican mood alive in Portugal in the 1870s. He joined the Historical Party, which, in 1876 was to become the Progressive Party. This resulted in his collaboration in journals where he could express and defend his political ideas.

He was part of the editorial team for the Gazeta do Povo and shortly afterwards nominated director of O Páis, which became the official organ of the Progressive Party, changing its name to O Progresso.

In 1870 in his book, "A Guerra e a Democracia", Enes argued that the old model of the European state was obsolete and advocated federalism as the only future for the continent. He suggested that a pan-Latin federal state (made up of Belgium, France, Spain, Italy and Portugal) would confront similar pan-Germanic and pan-Slavic entities.

In 1880 he was elected a Deputy, but parliament was dissolved. He was re-elected in 1884, serving successive terms from 1884 to 1887, 1887–89 and 1890–91.

== The dramatist ==
Building on his contacts made in journalism, between 1875 and 1883, Enes became a dramatist. He wrote eight plays in the realist style: seven dramas and one comedy.

The first of these, Os Lazaristas (1875), became notorious in Portugal and Brazil for its strongly anti-clerical message. The play centres on Bergeret, a French Lazarist priest in pursuit of riches. By preaching a corrupt and merciless version of the catholic doctrine Bergeret persuades Luísa, a young heiress, to devote herself to life in a nunnery and her fortune to the church. The play contrasts reactionary ultramontanism - represented by Bergeret - with progressive liberalism, represented by Ernesto, a young revolutionary who would be Luisa's husband.

Enes's enthusiasm for the theatre was not limited just to writing: he was a spectator and regular visitor backstage. It was in this way that he met the actress Emília dos Anjos, whom he married and with whom he had one daughter, Luísa.

== The Government Minister and Colonial Administrator ==
Immediately after the British Ultimatum of 1890, António Enes was nominated Minister of the Navy and Overseas (he served from 14 October 1890 to 25 May 1891) in the government of General João Crisóstomo de Abreu e Sousa. It was a time of intense political tension as a wave of nationalism swept Portugal following the British ultimatum. António Enes was able to maintain the necessary internal and external balances. In particular, he organised a military expedition to Portuguese Mozambique, with the objective of breaking the increasing political proximity of Gungunhana and the British. He also intervened energetically in the colonies of Portuguese São Tomé and Príncipe, Portuguese Guinea and Bié.

Enes was succeeded as minister by Júlio de Vilhena and in 1891 he was nominated High Commissioner in Mozambique, where he left his name connected with notable works including organising the expedition of Joaquim Augusto Mouzinho de Albuquerque against the Empire of Gaza and which resulted in the annexation of Gaza by Portugal. Enes wrote a book about the war against Gaza, A guerra de Africa em 1895: Memórias.

== Brazil and final return to Portugal ==
In 1896 Enes was chosen to act as Minister of Portugal in Brazil and he moved to Rio de Janeiro. The objective was to rebuild friendly relationships between the two countries, which had been badly shaken by the declaration of the Brazilian republic in 1889. Enes did not enjoy this role and he repeatedly asked to be relieved of the post, which occurred only in May 1900.

On his return to Portugal, Enes once again took up journalism, founding "O Dia" and writing about politics. A few months later, with serious respiratory problems, he moved for the last time to Queluz where he died on 6 August 1901 shortly before his 53rd birthday.
