= Tsonga Kingdoms =

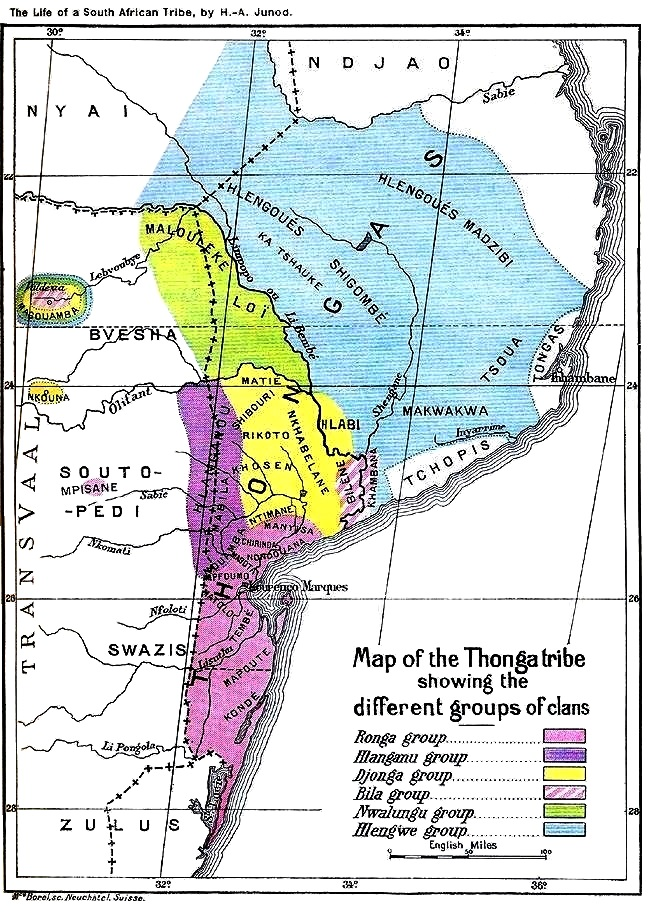
The Tsonga kingdoms

The Tsonga kingdoms were a group of small states in southern Mozambique belonging to the Tsonga ethnic group, which the Portuguese called landins and which at the beginning of the 19th century numbered about twenty independent kingdoms. The best known were the kingdoms of Maputo, Niaca, Matola, Tembe, Mafumo, Mabotsa and Magaia. Their wealth depended on agriculture and trade, such as the sale of copper, slaves and ivory. The Tsonga population increased after the Portuguese introduced maize to the region. When the Mfecane and nguni invasions took place, the Tsonga became angunized, adopting cattle breeding. Many Tsonga served as soldiers in the Portuguese army. At the end of the 19th century, these kingdoms were incorporated into the province of Mozambique by the Portuguese.

== See also ==
- History of Mozambique
- Portuguese Mozambique
- Campaigns of Pacification and Occupation
