= Gaza Empire =

Empire in southeastern Africa

Coordinates: 21.195898°S 32.745166°E

- 1824–1895
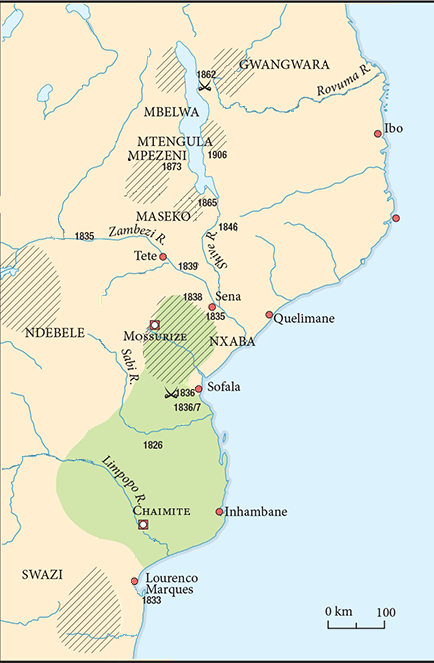
- Map of the empire at its peak

Government
  - Monarch: Soshangane (first)
  - Monarch: Gungunhana (last)
- Establishment: 1824
- History
  - Dissolved: 1895
  - Established: 1824
  - Disestablished: 1895
- Today part of: Mozambique

The Gaza Empire (1824–1895) was an African empire established by Soshangane and was located in southeastern Africa in the area of southern Mozambique and southeastern Zimbabwe. The Gaza Empire, at its height in the 1860s, covered all of Mozambique between the Zambezi and Limpopo rivers, known as Gazaland.

== History ==
In the 1820s, during a period of severe drought, after the abolition of slavery caused the Great Trek, Nguni armies, Southern (Xhosa) and especially Northern Nguni (Zulu, Swazi, Shangani, Gaza, Matabele or Ndebele, and Ngoni) people who spoke related Bantu languages and inhabited southeast Africa from Cape Colony to southern Mozambique, began to migrate to Mozambique from what is now South Africa. One Nguni chief, Nxaba, established a short-lived kingdom inland from Sofala, but in 1837 he was defeated by Soshangane, a powerful Nguni rival. Eventually Soshangane established his capital in the highlands of the middle Sabi River in what is present day Zimbabwe. Soshangane named his empire "Gaza" after his grandfather.

Soshangane died in 1856 and there was a bitter struggle for power between his sons Mawewe and Mzila. With help from the Portuguese, Mzila eventually gained power in 1861 and ruled until 1884. Soshangane's grandson, Gungunyana, took over the Gaza Empire from his father Mzila and moved the capital southward to Manjakazi, putting him in closer proximity with the Portuguese.

With the prolonged drought, the rise of Gaza, the dominance of the slave trade, and the expansion of Portuguese control in the Zambezi Valley, the once-mighty African chieftaincies of the Zambezi region declined. In their place, valley warlords established fortified strongholds at the confluence of the major rivers, where they raised private armies and raided for slaves in the interior. The most powerful of these warlords was Manuel António de Sousa, also known as Gouveia, a settler from Portuguese India, who by the middle of the 19th century controlled most of the southern Zambezi Valley and a huge swath of land to its south. North of the Zambezi, Islamic slave traders rose to power from their base in Angoche, and the Yao chiefs of the north migrated south to the highlands along the Shire River, where they established their military power.

== People ==
The Shangaan descend from Nguni speakers (Swazi and Zulu), Tsonga speakers (including the Ronga), and others (Ndau, Shona and Chopi), many of whom Soshangane conquered and subjugated. Soshangane insisted that Nguni customs be adopted, and that the Tsonga, Ndau learn the Nguni language. Young men were assigned to the army as "Mavulandlela" (those who open the road). Soshangane also imposed Shaka Zulu's military system of dominion and taught the people the Nguni ways of fighting.

For centuries, the Nguni peoples are thought to have lived in scattered patrilineal chiefdoms, cultivating cereal crops such as millet and raising cattle. The current geographic distribution of Nguni peoples largely reflects the turbulent political developments and population movements of the 19th century. In the 1820s the cattle-herding Zulu, led by their king Shaka, embarked on an aggressive campaign of conquest and expansion known as the mfecane. Shaka's large and well-armed armies conquered a number of neighboring peoples, and sent others fleeing. Some Nguni groups adopted the Zulu's methods of warfare and used them to subjugate the peoples in whose territory they ultimately settled.

== Invasion ==
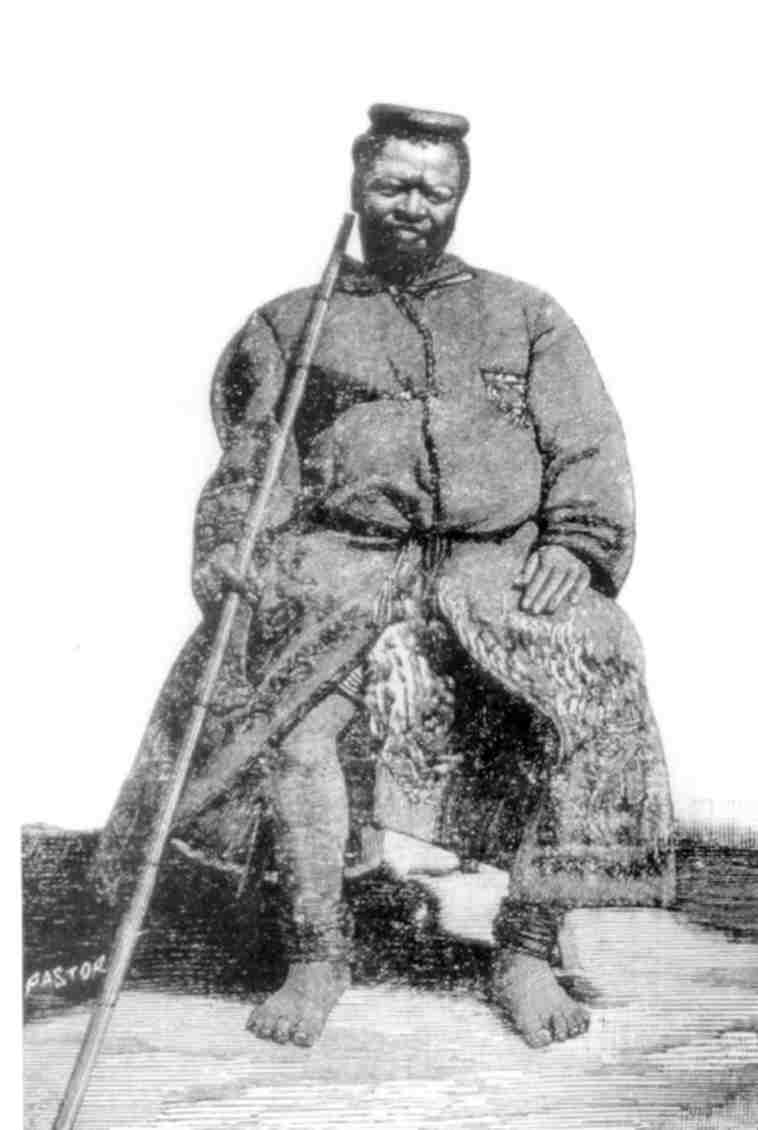
Gungunhana, the last dynastic emperor of the Gaza Empire

The Gaza Kingdom comprised parts of what are now southeastern Zimbabwe, as well as extending from the Sabi River down to the southern part of Mozambique, covering parts of the current provinces of Sofala, Manica, Inhambane, Gaza and Maputo, and neighboring parts of South Africa. Within the area encompassed by the Gaza Empire, Nguni armies invaded the north and established cattle-owning military states along the edges of the Mozambican highlands. Although not within the borders of modern-day Mozambique, these military states nonetheless served as effective bases for raids into Mozambique.

Soshangane extended his control over the area between the Komati (Incomati) and the Zambezi rivers, incorporating the local Tsonga and Shona peoples into his Kingdom. The waves of armed groups disrupted both trade and day-to-day production throughout the area. Two groups, the Jele under Zwangendaba and the Ndwandwe (both later known as Nguni) under Soshangane, swept through Mozambique. Zwangendaba's group continued north across the Zambezi, settling to the west of contemporary Mozambique, but Soshangane's group crossed the Limpopo into southern Mozambique.

Another army, under the command of Dingane and Mhlangana, was sent by Shaka to deal with Soshangane, but the army suffered great hardship because of hunger and malaria, and Soshangane had no difficulty in driving them off, towards the end of 1828. During the whole of this turbulent period, from 1830 onwards, groups of Tsonga speakers moved southwards and defeated smaller groups.

Despite their eviction from the highlands, the Portuguese gradually extended their control up the Zambezi Valley and north and south along the Mozambican coast. In 1727, they founded a trading post at Inhambane, on the southern coast, and in 1781 they permanently occupied Delagoa Bay. However, Soshangane's army overran these Portuguese settlements during the time of the Gaza Empire.

The empire under Soshangane has been criticized for involvement in the slave trade between the year 1830 and 1897, and human rights violations over the indigenous peoples of Mozambique and Zimbabwe. The Shangaan tribe has recently also been accused of enforcing tribalism over the Tsonga people of South Africa.

== Decline ==
After the death of Soshangane in 1856, his sons fought over being his successor. He had left the throne to Mzila, but Mawewe felt that he should be emperor instead. Mawewe attacked Mzila and his followers, causing them to leave Mozambique and flee to the Soutpansberg Mountains in the Transvaal. In 1884 and 1885 European powers carved Africa into spheres of influence at the Berlin West Africa Conference. As a result of this scramble for Africa by the European States, the territory of the Gaza Empire was designated as Portuguese territory. Gungunyana fiercely resisted the encroachment of the Portuguese but was eventually defeated. Gungunyana was exiled to the Azores where he died in 1906. The cause of the collapse of the Gaza Empire was its defeat by the Portuguese in 1895.

== Present day ==
The territories of the Gaza Empire are now ruled by Mozambique, South Africa and Zimbabwe. Mozambique is divided into eleven provinces, one of which is named Gaza.

The descendants of Gungunyana currently reside in South Africa, including chief of the Nxumalo clan Abednigo Nxumalo. The previous king Eric Mpisane Nxumalo, had applied for recognition to the Nhlapo Commission, but was rejected in 2012. Mpisane died in 2021. Claims of the kingdom's authority over the Tsonga people of South Africa have also been rejected by Tsonga traditional leaders in South Africa.

== Monarchs ==
- Soshangane – 1824–1858
- Mawewe – 1858–1861
- Mzila – 1861–1884
- Ngungunhane – 1884–1895

== See also ==
- Bantu languages
- Portuguese conquest of the Gaza Empire
