= Joaquim Augusto Mouzinho de Albuquerque =

Portuguese cavalry officer

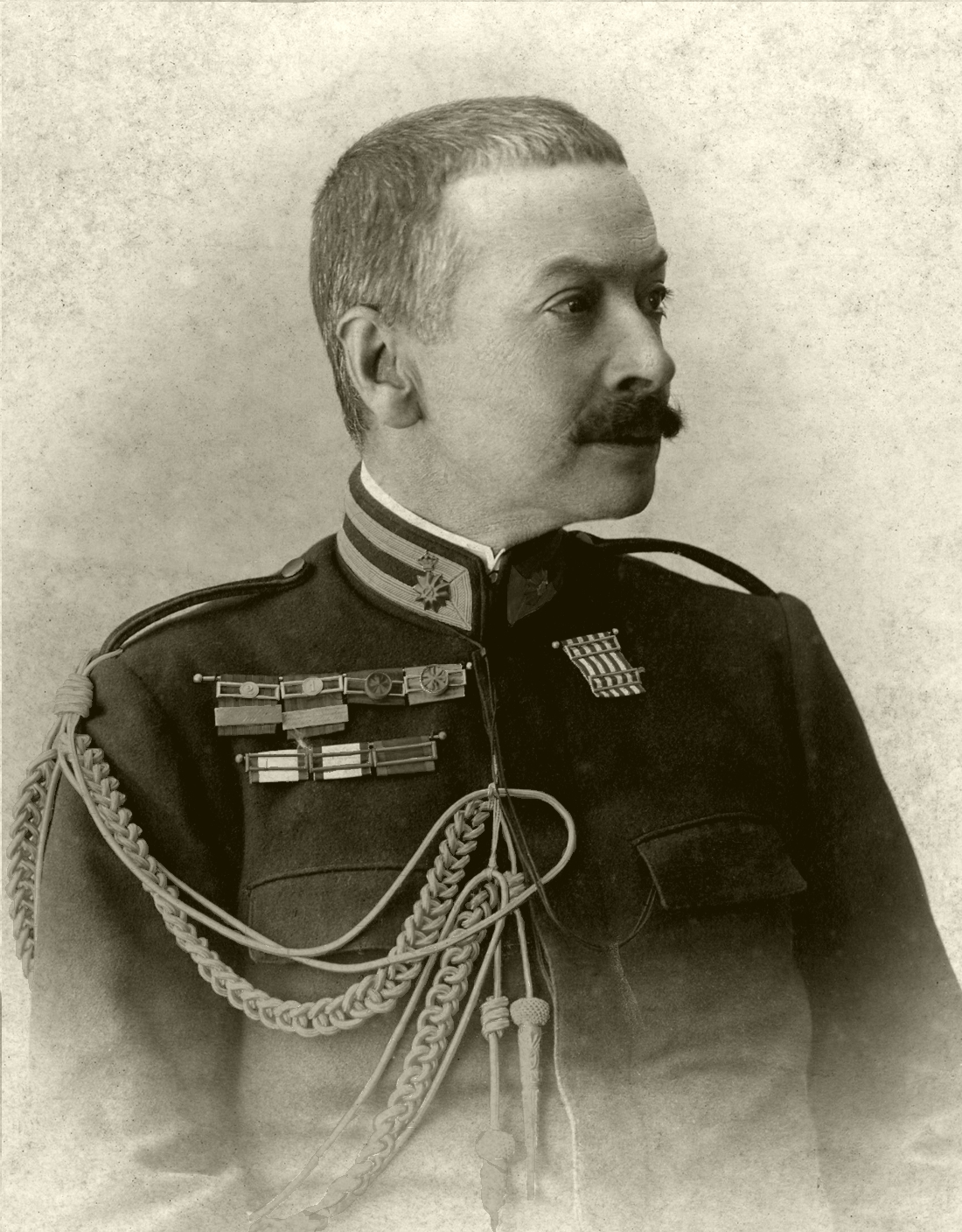

Interim Governor of Portuguese India
- In office 1889–1889
- Monarch: Carlos I of Portugal
- Preceded by: Augusto César Cardoso de Carvalho
- Succeeded by: Council of Government

Counsellor of Government of Portuguese India
- In office 1889–1889
- Monarch: Carlos I of Portugal
- Preceded by: Himself
- Succeeded by: Vasco Guedes de Carvalho e Meneses

Governor-General of Portuguese Mozambique
- In office 1896–1897
- Monarch: Carlos I of Portugal
- Preceded by: Joaquim da Graça Correia e Lança
- Succeeded by: Baltasar Freire Cabral

Personal details
- Born: 12 November 1855 Batalha, Kingdom of Portugal
- Died: 8 January 1902 (aged 46) Lisbon, Kingdom of Portugal

Military service
- Allegiance: Portuguese Empire
- Branch/service: Army
- Rank: Lieutenant-coronel
- Battles/wars: Campaigns of Pacification and Occupation; Portuguese conquest of the Gaza Empire

Joaquim Augusto Mouzinho de Albuquerque (12 November 1855 – 8 January 1902) was a Portuguese cavalry officer. He captured Gungunhana in Chaimite (1895) and was governor-general of Mozambique. He was a grandson of Luís da Silva Mouzinho de Albuquerque.

Mouzinho de Albuquerque was born in Batalha, and died in Lisbon.

== Career ==
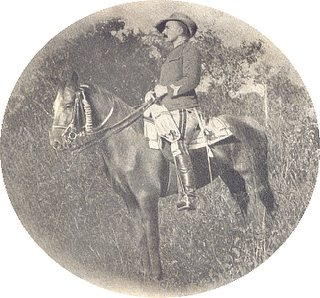
Mouzinho de Albuquerque in 1897

With his wife, 1898

Having served in India during the 1880s, Mouzinho de Albuquerque was highly respected in Portuguese society of the 19th and 20th centuries. He was seen as the hope and symbol of Portuguese reaction to threats against Portuguese interests in Africa from other European empires.

He married his cousin Maria José Mascarenhas de Mendonça Gaivão (Lagoa, 23 July 1857 –Lisbon, 2 September 1950), without issue.

He was governor of Gaza Province and Mozambique until 1898 when he returned to Portugal. During his time as governor, Mouzinho served as commander of a cavalry squadron that fought Gungunhane. On 28 December 1895 Mouzinho captured Gungunhane in Chaimite without firing a gunshot.

He was the instructor of Crown Prince Luís Filipe.

He allegedly committed suicide at the entrance of the Jardim das Laranjeiras in Lisbon on 8 January 1902 (some sources claim he was killed).

== Honours ==
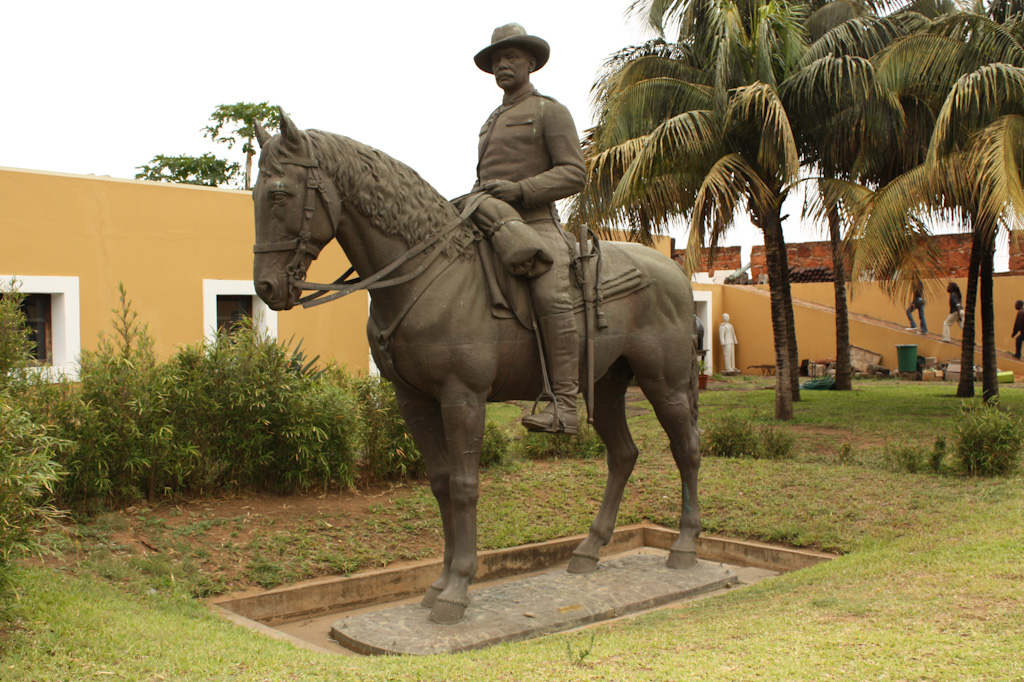
Equestrian statue at Maputo's Fortress

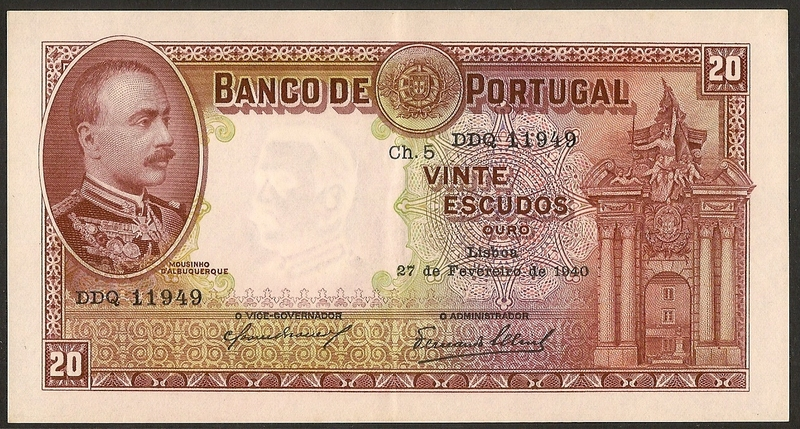
Mouzinho de Albuquerque on a Portuguese 20 escudo note issued in the 1940s

He was depicted in a 20 Portuguese escudo note issued in the 1940s.

== Memorial ==
The Rotunda da Boavista, also known as the Praça de Mouzinho de Albuquerque, honors the soldier.

== Works ==
- O Exercito nas Colonias Orientais, (Military of the Eastern Colonies) Minerva Commercial, 1893.
- Relatório sobre a prisão do Gungunhana, Lourenço Marques, Typ. Nacional, 1896.
- A prisão do Gungunhana (Gungunhana Prison), Lourenço Marques, Typ. Nacional de Sampaio e Carvalho, 1896.
- Campanha contra o Maguiguana nos territórios de Gaza em 1897 (Campaign Against Maguiguana in the Territories of Gaza (Mozambique) in 1897, 1897.
- Providências... desde 1 de Dezembro de 1896 até 18 de Novembro de 1897 (Providences.. Since 1 December 1896 to 18 November 1897), Lisbon, Imp. Nacional, 1898.
- Moçambique 1896-1898 (Mozambique 1896-1898), Lisbon, Manoel Gomes, 1899.
- Entre mortos, carta inédita de Mouzinho de Albuquerque a sua Alteza o Príncipe Real D. Luis de Bragança, Lisbon, Tip. "A Editora", 1908.
- Livro das campanhas (Books on Campaigns), Lisbon, Div. de Publicações e Bibliotecas, 1935.
- Mouzinho de Albuquerque : a renúncia do Comissário Régio, Lourenço Marques, Minerva Central, 1953.
- Pensamento e acção de Mouzinho em Moçambique : antologia, Lisbon, Gráf. Boa Nova, 1956.

== See also ==
- Portuguese conquest of the Gaza Empire

Preceded by Augusto César Cardoso de Carvalho	Interim governor of Portuguese India; 1889	Succeeded by 28th Council of Government of the State of India, which included himself, António Sebastião Valente, Joaquim Borges de Azevedo Enes and José Inácio de Brito
Preceded by himself	Council of Government of the State of India; 1889 with António Sebastião Valente, Joaquim Borges de Azevedo Enes and José Inácio de Brito	Succeeded by Vasco Guedes de Carvalho e Meneses
Preceded by Joaquim da Graça Correia e Lança	Governor-general of Mozambique; 1896-1897	Succeeded by Baltasar Freire Cabral
