= List of paratrooper forces =

Many countries around the world maintain military units that are trained as paratroopers. These include special forces units that are parachute-trained, as well as non-airborne forces units.

== Abkhazia ==
- Independent Special Purpose Detachment (Отдельный Отряд Специального Назначения - Otdel'nyy Otryad Spetsial'nogo Naznacheniya) (Note: De facto state with limited international recognition)

== Albania ==
- Special Operations Battalion (Batalioni i Operacioneve Speciale)

== Algeria ==
- Army
  - 17th Airborne Division
    - 1st Parachute Commando Regiment
    - 4th Parachute Commando Regiment
    - 5th Parachute Commando Regiment
    - 6th Parachute Commando Regiment
    - 12th Parachute Commando Regiment
    - 18th Parachute Commando Regiment
    - Parachute Artillery Regiment
    - Parachute Engineers Battalion
  - 25th Reconnasissance Regiment
  - 104th Operational Maneuver Regiment
  - Commando Instruction and Parachute Training School "Martyr Derbal M'barek"
  - Special Troops Superior School "Martyr Mustapha Khoja called Si Ali"
- Air Force
  - 772nd Parachute Air Commando Fusiliers Regiment
  - 782nd Parachute Air Commando Fusiliers Regiment "Martyr Jaloul bin Azzouz"

== Angola ==
- Special Forces Brigade (Brigada de Forças Especiais)
- Special Forces Training School (Escola de Formação de Forças Especiais)

== Argentina ==
- Army
  - Rapid Deployment Force (Argentina) (Fuerza de Despliegue Rápido)
    - 4th Airborne Brigade (IV Brigada Aerotransportada)
      - Regimiento de Infantería Paracaidista 2 (2nd Parachute Infantry Regiment)
      - Regimiento de Infantería Paracaidista 14 "14th Parachute Infantry Regiment", including
        - Parachute Reserve Company "Córdoba" (Compañía de Reserva Paracaidista Córdoba)
      - Grupo de Artillería Paracaidista 4 ("4th Parachute Artillery Battalion")
      - 4th Parachute Cavalry Scout Squadron (Escuadrón de Exploración de Caballería Paracaidista 4)
      - Compañía de Ingenieros Paracaidista 4 (4th Parachute Engineers Company)
      - Compañía de Comunicaciones Paracaidista 4 (4th Parachute Signal Company)
      - Compañía Apoyo de Lanzamientos Aéreos Paracaidista 4 (4th Parachute Airdrop Support Company)
      - Parachute Guides Platoon "1st Lt. Guillermo Abally" (Sección Guías Paracaidistas "Teniente Primero Guillermo Abally")
      - Parachute Intelligence Platoon (Sección de Inteligencia Paracaidista)
    - Special Operations Forces Group (Agrupación de Fuerzas de Operaciones Especiales)
      - Compañía de Fuerzas Especiales 601 601 Special Forces Company
      - 601 Commando Company (Compañía de Comandos 601)
      - 602 Commando Company (Compañía de Comandos 602)
      - Compañía de Comandos 603 (603 Commando Company)
  - Escuela de Tropas Aerotransportadas y Tropas de Operaciones Especiales (Airborne Troops and Special Operations School)
- Navy
  - Amphibious Commandos Group (Agrupación de Comandos Anfibios)
  - Tactical Divers Group (Agrupación de Buzos Tácticos)
- Air Force
  - Grupo de Operaciones Especiales Special Operations Group

== Armenia ==
- 1st Special Forces Regiment (Armenia) (1-ին գնդակից հատուկ նպատակ - 1-in Gndakits' Hatuk Npatak)

== Australia ==
- Australian Army
  - Special Operations Command
    - Special Air Service Regiment
    - 1st Commando Regiment
    - 2nd Commando Regiment
    - Special Operations Engineer Regiment
    - Australian Defence Force Parachuting School
- Royal Australian Air Force
  - B Flight, No. 4 Squadron

== Austria ==
- Jägerbataillon 25
- Jagdkommando
- Military Paratrooper School

== Azerbaijan ==
- Army
  - 777th Special Purpose Brigade (777-ci Xüsusi Təyinat Briqada)
- Navy
  - Marine Special Purpose Sabotage and Reconnaissance Center - Military Unit 641 (Dəniz Təxribat və Kəşfiyyat Mərkəz Xüsusi Təyinat - 641 Saylı Hərbi Hissə)

== Bahrain ==
- Royal Guard Special Forces Battalion (الحرس الملكي كتيبة قوات خاصة - Alharas Almalakiu Katibat Quwwat Khasa)

== Bangladesh ==
- Army
  - Para Commando Brigade
    - 1st Para Commando Battalion
    - 2nd Para Commando Battalion
- Navy
  - Special Warfare Diving and Salvage
- Air Force
  - 41 Squadron Airborne

== Belarus ==
- Special Operations Forces Command (Камандаванне сіл спецыяльных аперацый - Kamandavannie Sil Spiecyjaĺnych Apieracyj)
  - 5th Independent Special Assignments Brigade (5-я асобная брыгада спецыяльнага прызначэння - 5-ja Asobnaja Bryhada Spiecyjaĺnaha Pryznačennia)
  - 38th Independent Guards Air Assault Brigade "Wien" (38-ю Венская асобную гвардзейскую дэсантна-штурмавую брыгаду - 38-ju Venskaya Asobnuju Hvardziejskuju Desantna-Sturmavuju Bryhadu)
  - 103rd Independent Guards Parachute Assault Brigade "Viciebsk" (103-ю Віцебскую асобную гвардзейскую паветрана-дэсантную брыгаду - 103-ju Viciebskuju Asobnuju Hvardziejskuju Pavietrana-Desantnuju Bryhadu)

== Belgium ==
- Special Operations Regiment
  - 2nd Commando Battalion
  - 3rd Parachute Battalion
  - Special Forces Group
  - 6th Communication and Information Systems Group
  - Paratrooper Training Center

== Benin ==
- 1st Parachute Commandos Battalion (1er Bataillon de Commandos Parachutistes)

== Bolivia ==
- Army
  - 16th Special Forces Regiment "Jordán" (Regimiento de Fuerzas Especiales Nº 16 "Jordán")
  - 18th Airborne Commandos Regiment "Victoria" - Special Troops instruction Center (Regimiento de Comandos Aerotransportados Nº 18 "Victoria - Centro de Instrucción de Tropas Especiales")
- Navy
  - Amphibious Commandos Battalion (Batallón de Comandos Anfibios)

== Botswana ==
- Commando Battalion
- Para and Presidential Guards Battalion

== Brazil ==
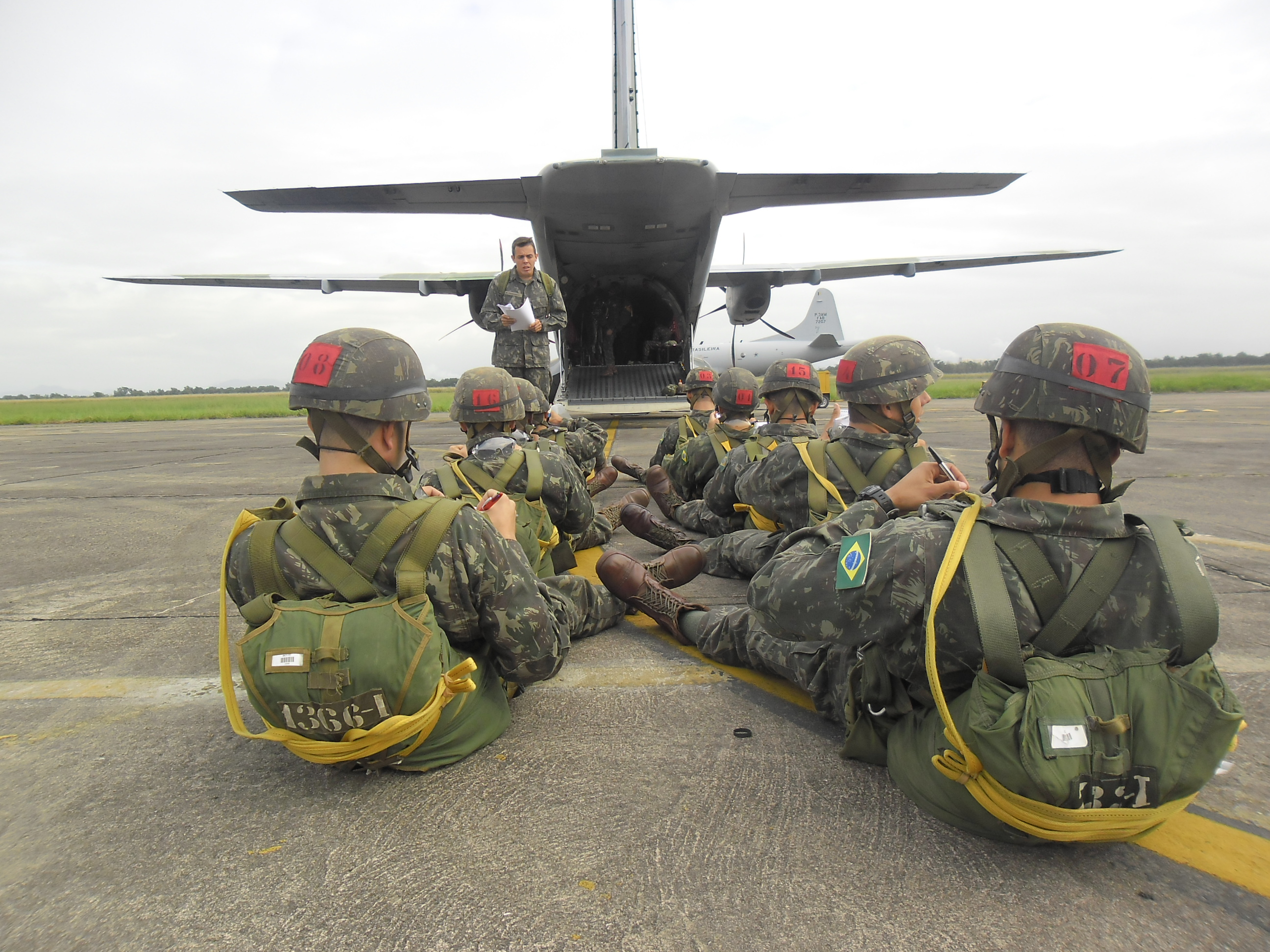
Brazilian pathfinders

- Army
  - Paratroopers Brigade
    - Parachute Infantry Brigade Headquarters Company
    - 25th Parachute Infantry Battalion "Campo dos Afonsos"
    - 26th Parachute Infantry Battalion "Alberto Santos-Dumont"
    - 27th Parachute Infantry Battalion "General Newton Lemos"
    - 8th Parachute Field Artillery Battalion
    - 20th Parachute Logistics Battalion
    - Parachute Folding, Maintenance and Air Supply Battalion
    - Parachute Pathfinders Company
    - 1st Parachute Cavalry Squadron
    - 21st Parachutist Anti Aircraft Artillery Battery
    - 1st Parachute Combat Engineers Company
    - 20th Parachute Signal Company
    - Parachute Training Company
    - 36th Parachute Army Police Platoon
    - Parachute Medical Detachment
  - Special Operations Command (Comando de Operações Especiais)
    - 1st Special Forces Battalion "António Dias Cardoso"
    - 1st Commando Operations Battalion "Captain Francisco Padilha"
    - 3rd Special Forces Company "Brigadier General Thaumaturgo Sotero Vaz"
  - Parachutist Training Center "General Penha Brasil"
- Navy
  - Combat Divers Group
  - Naval Fusiliers Special Operation Battalion "Tonelero"
- Air Force
  - Air-Land Rescue Squadron

== Brunei ==
- Army
  - Special Forces Regiment (Rejimen Pasukan Khas)
- Air Force
  - Tactical Air Supply Parachute Unit (Unit Payung Terjun Pembekal Udara Taktikal)

== Bulgaria ==
Bulgarian paratroopers training

- Joint Special Operations Command (Съвместно Командване на Специалните Операции - Sŭvmestno Komandvane na Spetsialnite Operatsii)
  - Army
    - 1st Special Forces Battalion (1ви Батальон Специални Сили - 1vi Batalion Spetsialni Sili)
    - 2nd Special Forces Battalion (2ри Батальон Специални Сили - 2ri Batalion Spetsialni Sili)
    - 3rd Special Forces Battalion (3ти Батальон Специални Сили - 3ti Batalion Spetsialni Sili)
  - Navy
    - 65th Naval Special Reconnaissance Unit "Black Sea Sharks" (65-и Морски Специален Разузнавателен Отряд "Черноморски Акули" - 65-i Morski Spetsialen Razuznavatelen Otriad "Chernomorski Akuli")

== Burkina Faso ==
- 25th Parachute Commando Regiment (25e Régiment Parachutiste Commando)
- Airborne Technics Training Center (Centre d'Instruction aux Techniques Aéroportées)

== Burundi ==
- 121st Parachute Regiment (121e Régiment de Parachutistes)

== Cambodia ==
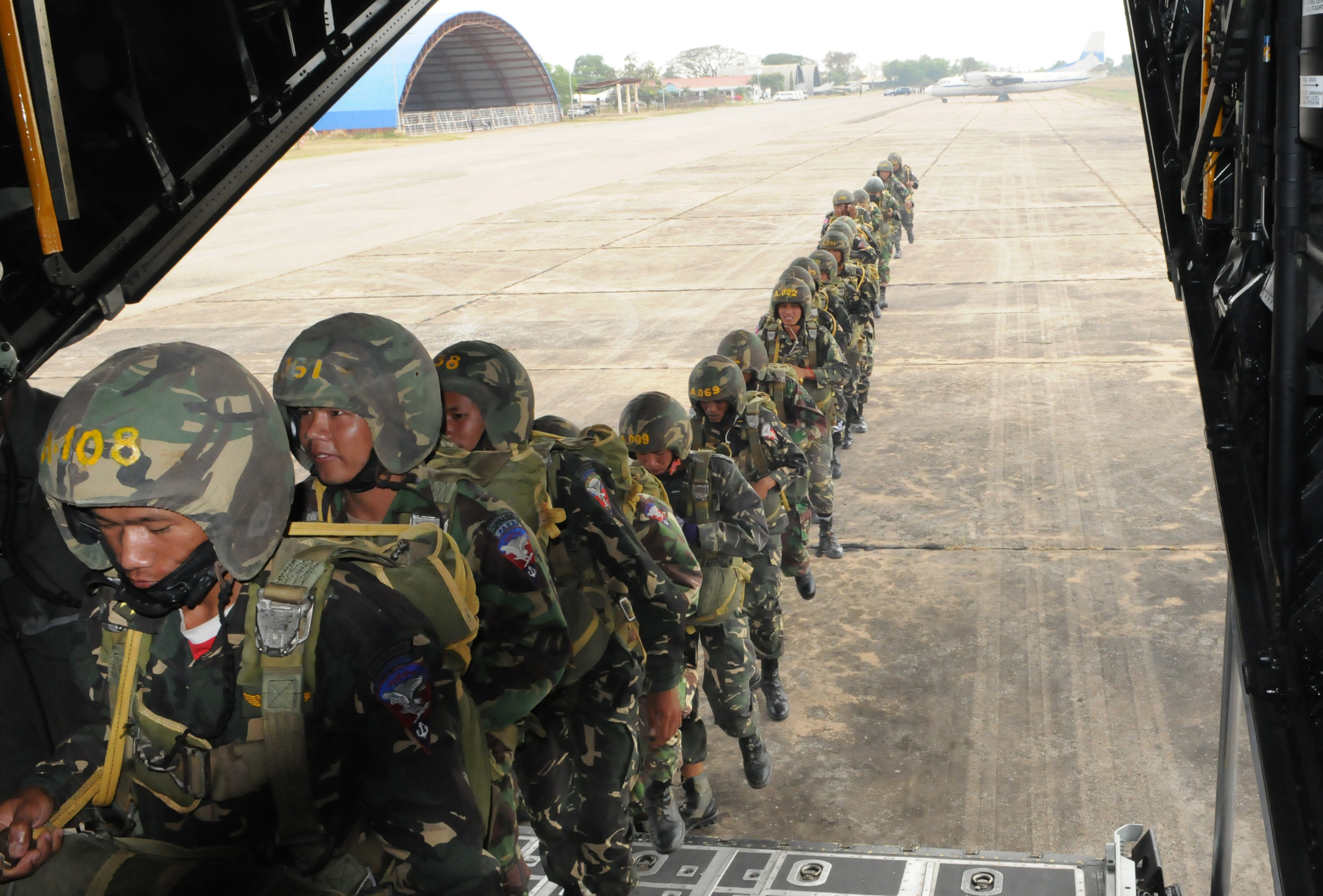
Cambodian paratroopers

- Special Forces Command (បញ្ជាការដ្ឋានទ័ពពិសេស - Banhcheakear Dthan tp Pises)
  - 1st Airborne Commando Battalion
  - 2nd Airborne Commando Battalion
  - 3rd Airborne Commando Battalion
  - 4th Airborne Commando Battalion

== Cameroon ==
- Airborne Troops Battalion (Bataillon des Troupes Aéroportées)

== Canada ==
- Army
  - Mike Company, 3rd Battalion, The Royal Canadian Regiment
  - Alpha Company, 3rd Battalion, Royal 22nd Regiment
  - Alpha Company, 3rd Battalion, Princess Patricia's Canadian Light Infantry
  - Parachute Company (Reserve), The Queen's Own Rifles of Canada
  - Parachute Training Company, Canadian Army Advanced Warfare Centre
- Air Force
  - Search and Rescue Technicians - Canadian Forces School of Search and Rescue
    - SAR Techs Teams - 103 Search and Rescue Squadron
    - SAR Techs Teams - 413 Transport and Rescue Squadron
    - SAR Techs Teams - 424 Transport and Rescue Squadron
    - SAR Techs Teams - 435 Transport and Rescue Squadron
    - SAR Techs Teams - 442 Transport and Rescue Squadron
- Canadian Special Operations Forces Command
  - Joint Task Force 2
  - Canadian Special Operations Regiment

== Chile ==
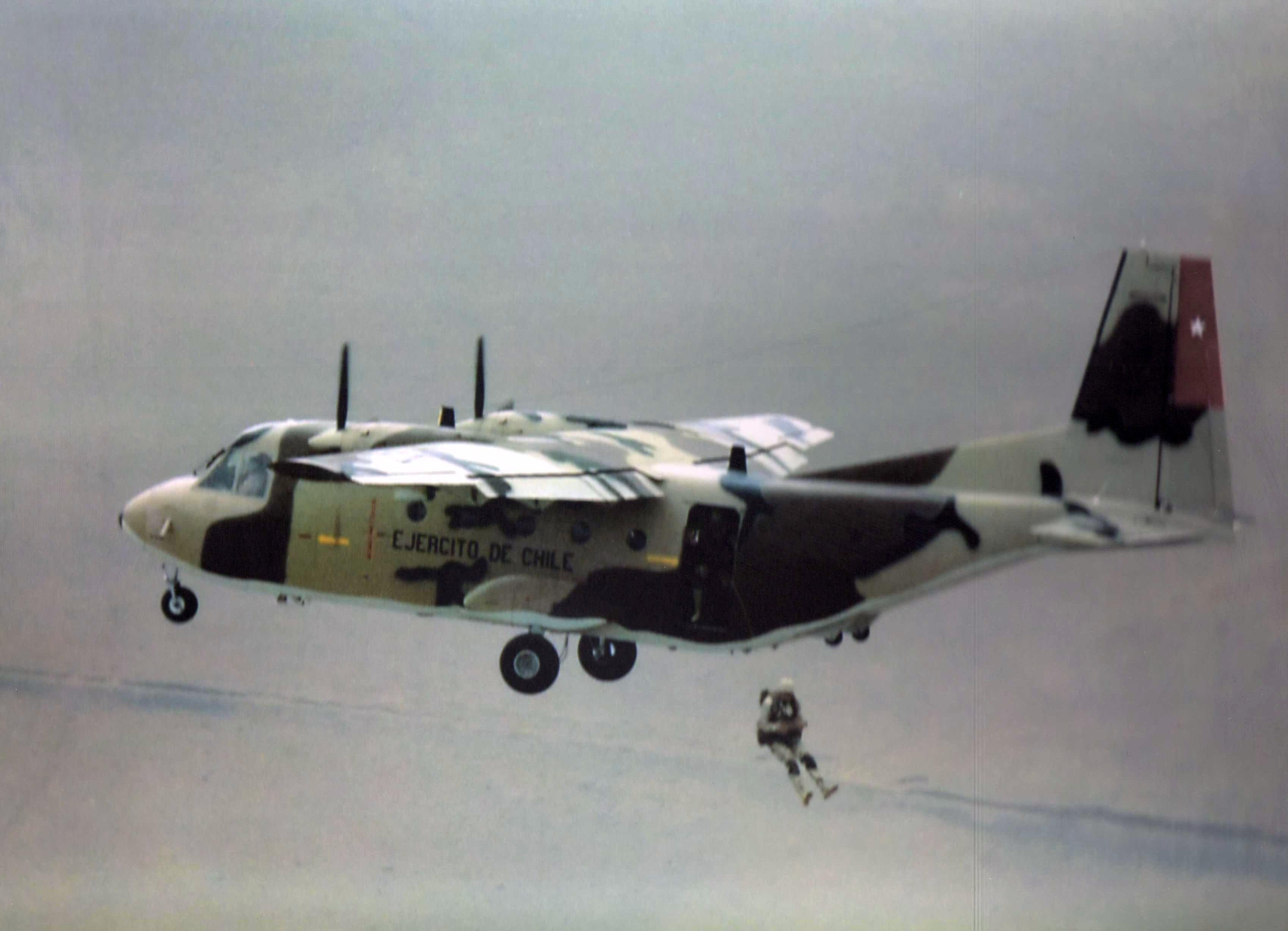
Chilean Army paratroopers jumping from a CASA 212

- Army
  - Lautaro Special Operations Brigade "Lautaro"
    - 1st Parachute Battalion "Pelantarú"
    - 5th Commando Company "Lientur"
    - 6th Commando Company "Iquique"
    - 12th Commando Company "Galvarino"
    - Special Forces Group
      - Airborne Company
      - Amphibious Company
      - Mountain Company
  - Paratroopers and Special Forces School
- Navy
  - Navy Special Forces Command
- Air Force
  - Special Forces Group - Air Force Commandos "Black Eagles"
    - Special Forces Tactical Unit - 2nd Air Force Group
    - Special Forces Tactical Unit - 5th Air Force Group
    - Special Forces Tactical Unit - 6th Air Force Group
    - Special Forces Tactical Unit - 8th Air Force Group
    - Special Forces Tactical Unit - 9th Air Force Group

== China (People’s Republic of China) ==
- Army
  - People's Liberation Army Special Operations Forces (中國人民解放軍特種部隊 )
    - 71st Special Warfare Brigade "Sword of the Kunlun Mountains" (「昆仑利刃」特战第71旅 )
    - 72nd Special Warfare Brigade (特战第72旅 )
    - 73rd Special Warfare Brigade "Flying Dragon" (「飛龍」特战第73旅 )
    - 74th Special Warfare Brigade (特战第74旅 )
    - 75th Special Warfare Brigade "Sword of South China" (「華南之劍」特战第75旅 )
    - 76th Special Warfare Brigade "Snow Maple" (「雪枫」特战第76旅 )
    - 77th Special Warfare Brigade "Hunting Leopard" (「獵豹」特战第77旅 )
    - 78th Special Warfare Brigade (特战第78旅 )
    - 79th Special Warfare Brigade "Siberian Tiger" (「東北虎」特战第79旅 )
    - 80th Special Warfare Brigade "Mount Tai Eagle" (「泰山雄鹰」特战第80旅)
    - 81st Special Warfare Brigade "Oriental Sword" (「東方神劍」特战第81旅 )
    - 82nd Special Warfare Brigade "Ringing Arrow" (「響箭」特战第82旅 )
    - 83rd Special Warfare Brigade "Heroic Eagle" (「雄鷹」特战第83旅 )
    - 84th Special Warfare Brigade "Night Tiger" (「暗夜之虎」特战第84旅 )
    - 85th Special Warfare Brigade "Highland Snow Leopard" (「高原雪豹」特战第85旅 )
    - Hong Kong Special Battalion (香港特种营 )
    - Macau Special Company (澳門特种连 )
  - Academy of Airborne Troops
- Navy
  - Marine Special Operations Brigade "Scaly Dragon" (海军陆战队特种作战旅 (蛟龍) )
  - Marine Corps 1st Brigade Amphibious Reconnaissance Special Team (海军陆战队第1旅两栖侦察特战队 )
  - Marine Corps 2nd Brigade Amphibious Reconnaissance Special Team (海军陆战队第2旅两栖侦察特战队 )
- Air Force
  - Airborne Corps Special Operations Brigade "Thunder God" (中国人民解放军空降兵军特种作战旅(雷神) )
  - People's Liberation Army Air Force Airborne Corps (中國人民解放軍空降兵軍 )
    - 127th Airborne Brigade (127空降旅 )
    - 128th Airborne Brigade (128空降旅 )
    - 130th Airborne Brigade (130空降旅 )
    - 131st Airborne Brigade (131空降旅 )
    - 133rd Airborne Brigade (133空降旅 )
    - 134th Airborne Brigade (134空降旅 )

== Taiwan (Republic of China) ==
- Army
  - Army Special Operations Command
    - 1st Special Operations Battalion "Might"
    - 2nd Special Operations Battalion "Dare"
    - 3rd Special Operations Battalion "Firm"
    - 4th Special Operations Battalion "Fierce"
    - 5th Special Operations Battalion "Strong"
    - High Altitude Special Service Squadron
  - Army Airborne Training Center
- Navy
  - Marine Corps
    - Amphibious Reconnaissance Unit

== Colombia ==
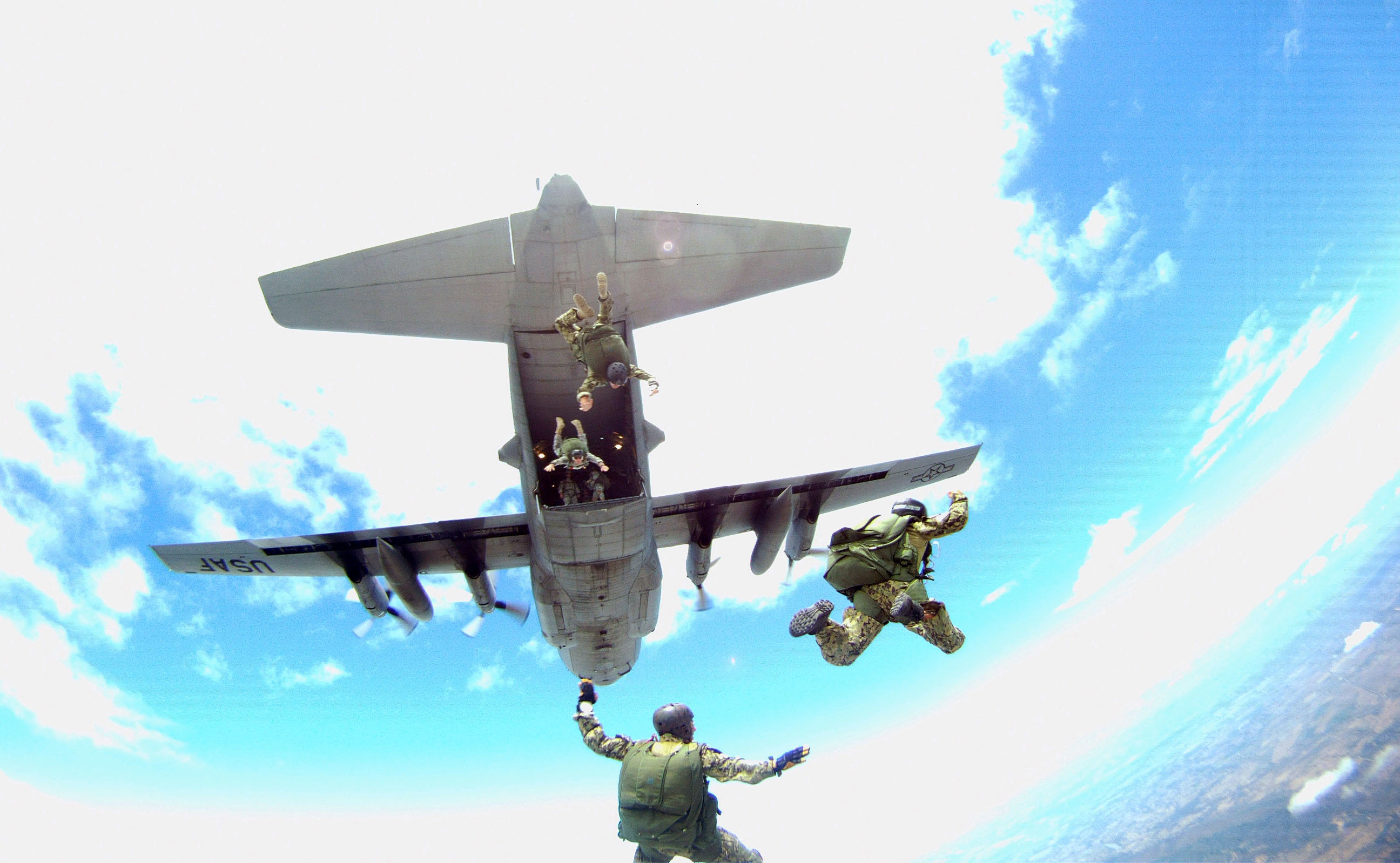
US and Colombian paratroopers

- Army
  - 19th Airborne Infantry Battalion "General Joaquín París"
  - 20th Airborne Infantry Battalion "General Manuel Roergas Serviez Medina|"
  - 21st Airborne Infantry Battalion "Battle of Vargas Swamp"
  - 28th Airborne Infantry Battalion "Colombia"
  - 31st Airborne Infantry Battalion "Rifles"
  - 7th Airborne Engineers Battalion "General Carlos Albán"
  - 18th Airborne Cavalry Group "General Gabriel Revéiz Pizarro"
  - Military Parachuting School
- Joint Special Operations Command
  - Army
    - Special Forces Division
      - 1st Special Forces Regiment
      - 2nd Special Forces Regiment
      - 3rd Special Forces Regiment
  - Navy
    - Marine Infantry Special Forces Battalion
  - Air Force
    - Special Air Commandos Group

== Congo-Brazzaville (Republic of Congo) ==
- Parachute Commando Group (Groupement Para-Commando)
- 102nd Airborne Battalion (102ème Bataillon Aéroporté)

== Congo-Kinshasa (Democratic Republic of Congo) ==
- 31st Fast Reaction Brigade (31e Brigade de Réaction Rapide)
  - three Para-Commando Battalions
- Airborne Troops Training Center (Centre d'Entraînement des Troupes Aéroportées)

== Croatia ==
- Special Operations Command (Zapovjedništvo Specijalnih Snaga)
  - 1st Special Forces Group (1. Grupa Specijalnih Snaga)
  - 2nd Special Forces Group (2. Grupa Specijalnih Snaga)
  - Commando Company (Komando Satnija)

== Cuba ==
- Airborne Brigade (Brigada Aerotransportada)
- Special Troops Mobile Brigade "Black Wasps" (Brigada Móvil de Tropas Especiales "Avispas Negras")
- National Special Troops School "Baraguá" (Escuela Nacional de Tropas Especiales "Baraguá")

== Cyprus (Republic of Cyprus) ==
- Raiders Command
- Underwater Demolition Team

== Cyprus (Turkish Republic of Northern Cyprus) ==
- Parachute and Commando Training Battalion (Hava Indirme ve Komando Eğitim Tabur) (Note: De facto state with limited international recognition.)

== Czech Republic ==
- 601st Special Forces Group "General Moravec" (601.Skupina Speciálních Sil "Generála Moravce")
- 43rd Airborne Regiment (43.Výsadkový Pluk), including:
  - Airborne Training Center (Středisko Výsadkové Přípravy)

== Denmark ==
- Special Operations Command (Specialoperationskommandoen)
  - Army
    - Huntsman Corps (Jægerkorpset)
  - Navy
    - Frogman Corps (Frømandskorpset)

== Djibouti ==
- National Gendarmerie Intervention Group (Groupe d'Intervention de la Gendarmerie Nationale)

== Dominican Republic ==
- Air Force
  - Special Forces Command "Brigadier General Freddy Franco Diaz" (Comando de Fuerzas Especiales "General de Brigada Freddy Franco Díaz")

== Ecuador ==
- Army
  - 9th Special Forces Brigade "Fatherland"
    - 25th Special Forces Group "South Base"
    - 26th Special Forces Group "Cenepa"
    - 27th Special Forces Group "General Miguel Iturralde"
    - 53rd Special Forces Group "Rayo"
    - Special Operations Group "Ecuador"
    - 9th Special Forces School "Captain Alejandro Romo Escobar"
- Navy
  - 21st Marine Infantry Battalion "Jaramijó" - Special Operations
- Air Force
  - Air Force Special Operations Group

== Egypt ==
- 414th Parachute Brigade
  - 176th Mechanized Parachute Infantry Battalion
  - 224th Parachute Infantry Battalion
  - 225th Parachute Infantry Battalion
  - 226th Parachute Infantry Battalion
  - Parachute Reconnaissance Company
- Parachute Forces School (مدرسة قوات المظلات - Madrasat Quwwat al-Mizallat)

== El Salvador ==
- Special Forces Command (Comando de Fuerzas Especiales)
  - Army
    - Special Operations Group (Grupo de Operaciones Especiales)
  - Air Force
    - Parachute Battalion (Batallón de Paracaidistas)

== Estonia ==
- Special Operations Force (Erioperatsioonide Väejuhatus)
  - Special Operations Group (Erioperatsioonide Grupp)

== Eswatini (Swaziland) ==
- one Paratrooper platoon

== Ethiopia ==
- 102nd Airborne Division (አየር ወለድ 102ኛ ክፍለ ጦር - Āyeri Weledi 102nya Kifile T'ori)

== Finland ==
- Army
  - Light Infantry Regiment "Utti" (Utin Jääkärirykmentti)
    - Erikoisjääkäripataljoona "Special Light Infantry Battalion"
      - Parachute Light Infantry Company (Laskuvarjojääkärikomppania)
      - Special Light Infantry Company (Erikoisjääkärikomppania)
- Navy
  - Coastal Brigade Special Operations Department (Rannikkoprikaatin Erikoistoimintaosasto)

== France ==
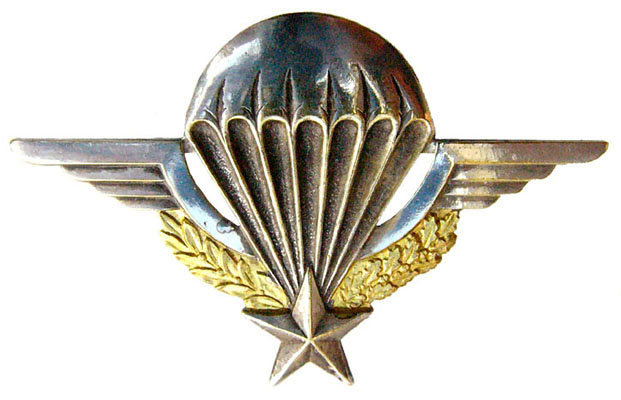
French Army and Navy paratrooper brevet

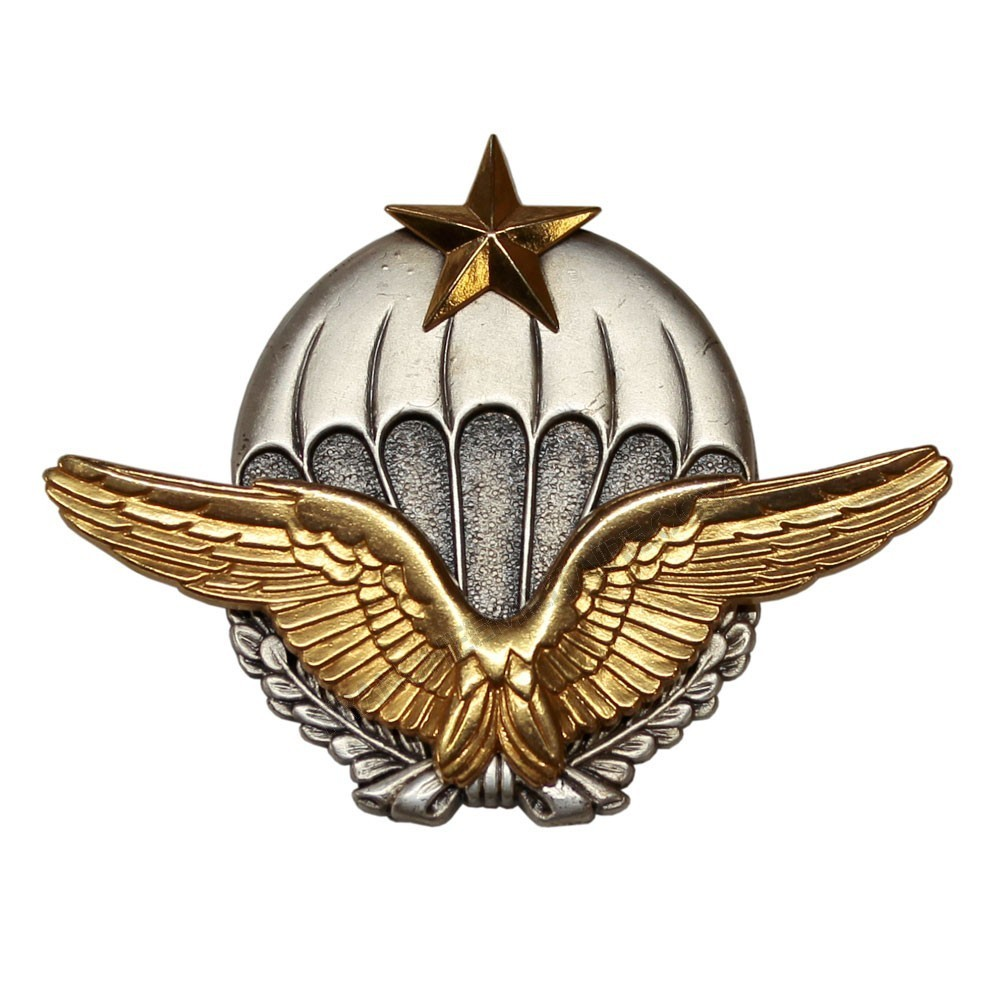
French Air Force paratrooper brevet

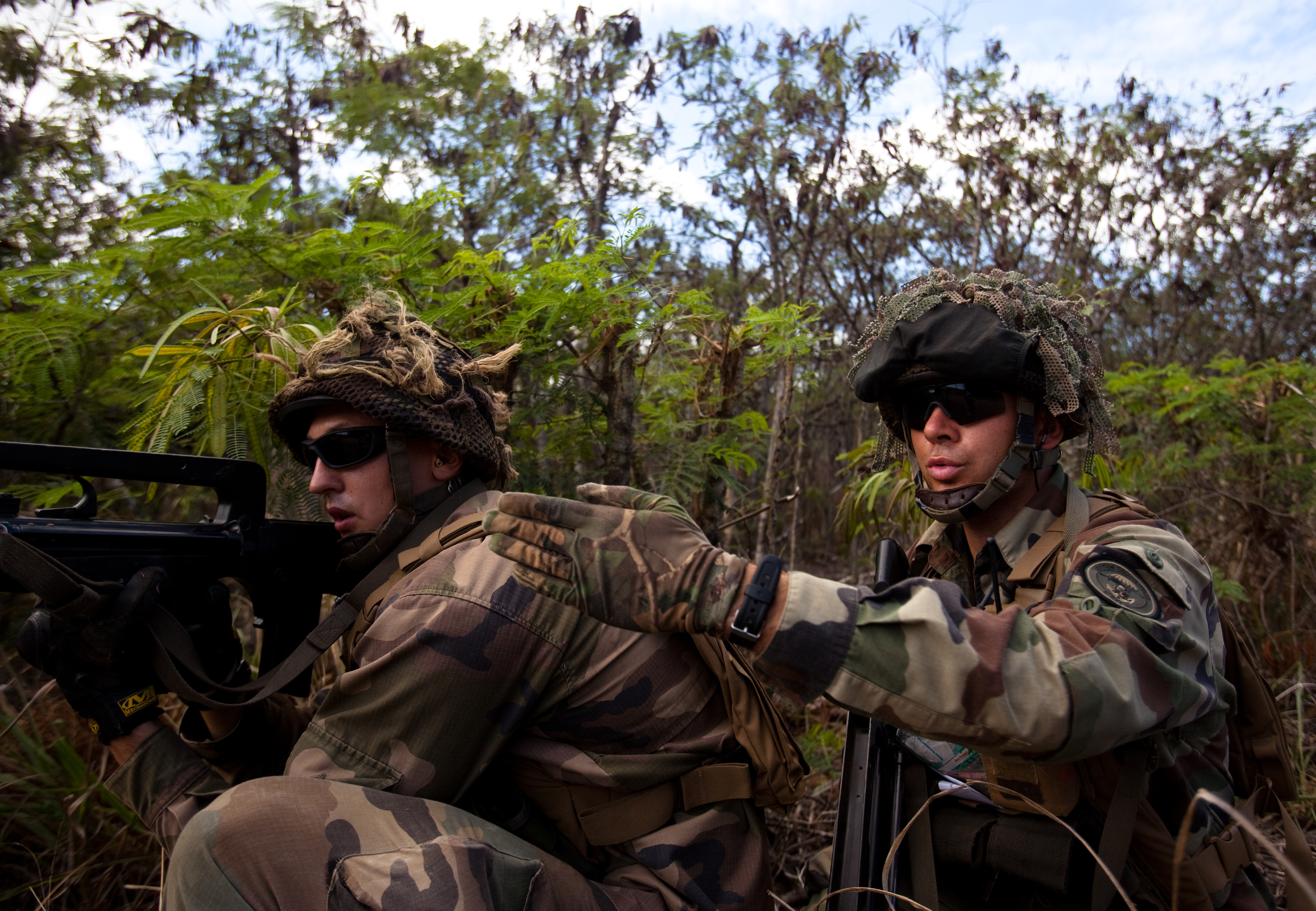
French Marine Infantry Paratroopers, 2012

- Army
  - Special Forces Command (Land)
    - 1st Marine Infantry Parachute Regiment
    - 13th Parachute Dragoon Regiment
  - 11th Parachute Brigade
    - Commando Parachute Group
    - 1st Parachute Hussar Regiment
    - 1st Parachute Chasseur Regiment
    - 2nd Foreign Parachute Regiment
    - 3rd Marine Infantry Parachute Regiment
    - 8th Marine Infantry Parachute Regiment
    - 1st Parachute Supply Regiment
    - 35th Parachute Artillery Regiment
    - 17th Parachute Engineer Regiment
    - 11th Parachute Headquarters and Signals Company
    - Airborne Troops School
    - 11th Parachute Brigade Troops Initial Formation Centre / 6th Marine Infantry Parachute Regiment
  - 2nd Marine Infantry Parachute Regiment
  - 3rd Materiel Regiment
    - 1st Mobility Maintenance Company
    - 2nd Mobility Maintenance Company
  - 14th Infantry and Parachute Logistic Support Regiment
    - 2nd Combatant Support Company (Paratrooper)
  - Engineer Combat Divers (Note: Underwater divers teams with additional paratrooper training, attached to each Engineer Regiment of the French Army)
  - National Commando Training Center / 1st Shock Regiment
- Navy
  - Navy Commandos (Commandos Marine)
    - Commando de Montfort
    - Commando Hubert
    - Commando Jaubert
    - Commando Kieffer
    - Commando de Penfentenyo
    - Commando Ponchardier
    - Commando Trépel
- Air Force
  - Brigade des forces spéciales air "Air Special Forces Brigade"
    - Air Commando Force Wing
      - Commando parachutiste de l'air n° 10 "10th Air Force Parachute Commando"
      - Commando parachutiste de l'air n° 30 (30th Air Force Parachute Commando)
      - Flying Jump Air Center
      - Centre de préparation opérationnel des combattants de l'Armée de l'air (Air Force Combatants Operational Preparation Center)
    - Air Protection Force
      - Commando parachutiste de l'air n° 20 ("s0th Air Force Parachute Commando")
- Gendarmerie
  - National Gendarmerie Intervention Group
- Joint
  - Action Service of the External Security General Directorate
    - Parachute Reservists Instruction Center
      - Parachute Special Instruction Center
      - Parachute Special Training Center
      - Parachute Special Training Center for Maritime Operations
  - Military Health Service
    - eight Parachutist Surgical Detachments

== Gabon ==
- 1st Parachute Regiment (1er Régiment Parachutiste)

== Georgia ==
- Special Operations Forces (სპეციალური ოპერაციების ძალები)
  - Special Operations Battalion East (სპეციალური ოპერაციების ბატალიონი აღმოსავლეთ
  - Special Operations Battalion West (სპეციალური ოპერაციების ბატალიონი დასავლეთში ), including:
    - Naval Special Forces Squadron (საზღვაო სპეციალური დანიშნულების რაზმი სოძ-ის )
  - Special Training Center "Major Gela Chedia" (მაიორ გელა ჭედიას სახელობის სპეციალური დანიშნულების სასწავლო ცენტრი , including:
    - Parachute Training School (საპარაშუტო მომზადების სკოლა )

== Germany ==
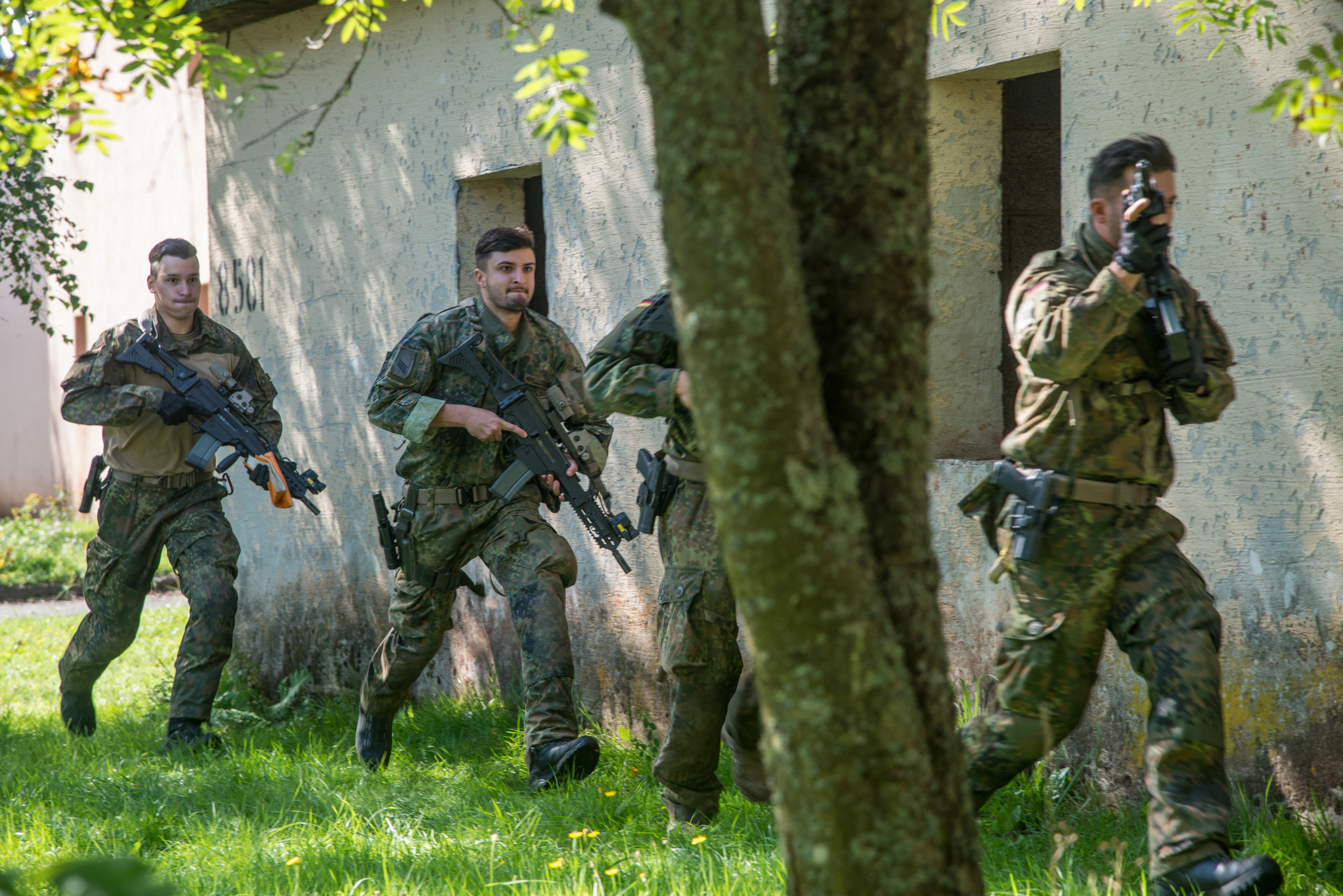
Paratroopers of the German Fallschirmjägerregiment 26 at the Baumholder Urban Combat Training Ground, 2017

- Army
  - Rapid Forces Division (Division Schnelle Kräfte)
    - Luftlandebrigade 1 1st Airborne Brigade "Saarland"
      - Headquarters and Signals Company (Stabs- und Fernmeldekompanie)
      - Fallschirmjägerregiment 26
      - Fallschirmjägerregiment 31
      - Luftlandeaufklärer 260th Airborne Reconnaissance Company (Luftlandeaufklärungskompanie 260)
      - Luftlandeaufklärungskompanie 310
      - Luftlandepionierkompanie 260 260th Airborne Engineer Company
      - Luftlandepionierkompanie 270 270th Airborne Engineer Company
    - Luftlande-/Lufttransportschule (Airborne/Air-transport School)
    - Gebirgsjägerbrigade 23 (23rd Mountain Infantry Brigade)
    - Kommando Spezialkräfte (Special Forces Command)
- Navy
  - Kommando Spezialkräfte Marine (Navy Special Forces Command)
    - Kampfschwimmerkompanie (Combat Swimmer Company)
- Air Force
  - Kampfretter (air force combat rescuemen)

== Ghana ==
- 69 Airborne Force (Note: Two parachute companies. See International Institute for Strategic Studies (2021). The Military Balance. Taylor & Francis. p. 468. ISBN 9781032012278.)

== Greece ==
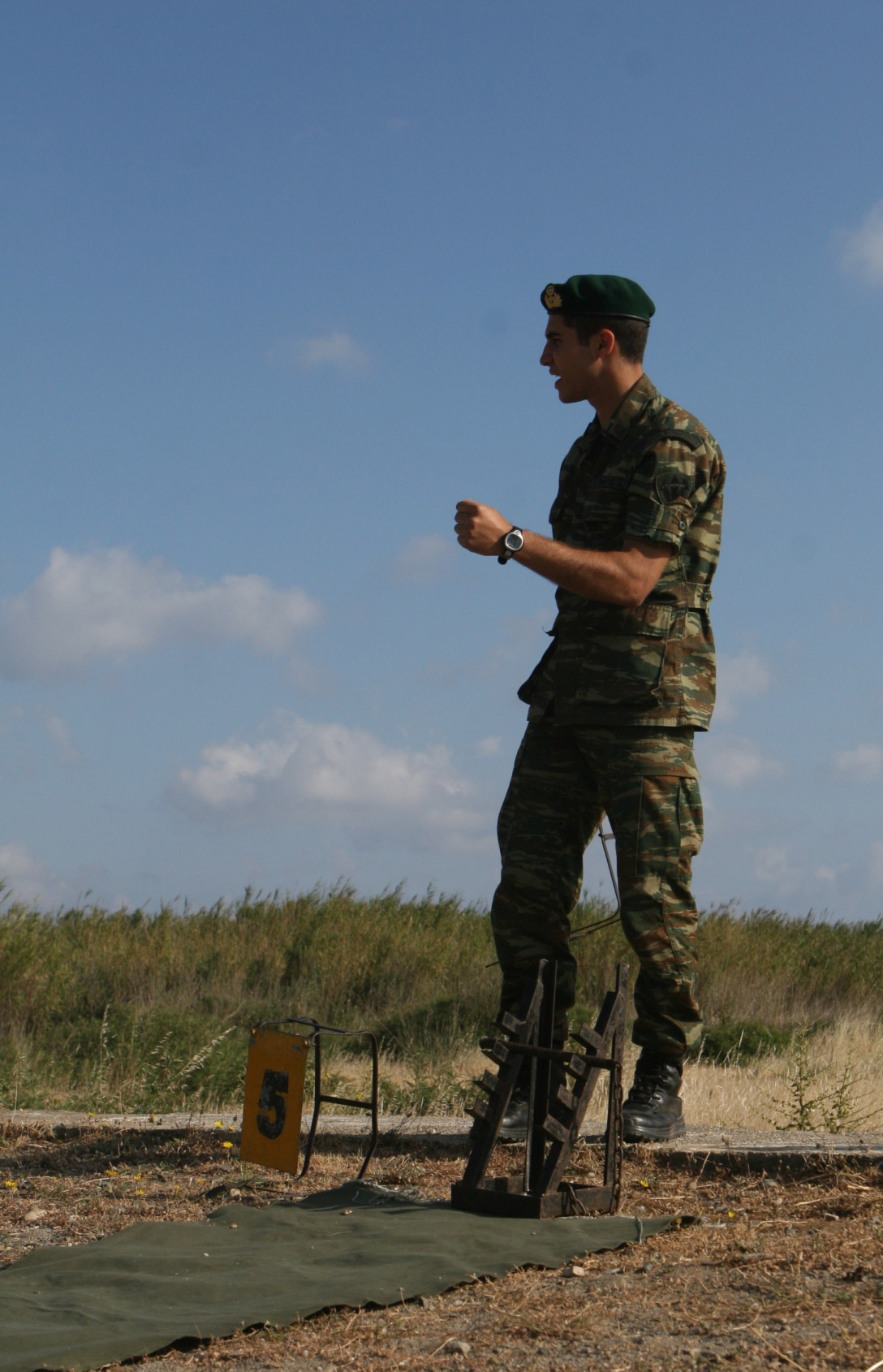
Greek paratrooper of the 1st Raider Regiment

- Army
  - 1st Raider/Paratrooper Brigade (1η Ταξιαρχία Kαταδρομών-Αλεξιπτωτιστών)
    - 1st Raider Regiment (1ο Σύνταγμα Καταδρομών)
    - 2nd Paratrooper Regiment (2ο Σύνταγμα Αλεξιπτωτιστών)
    - Special Paratrooper Section
  - Paratrooper School (Σχολή Αλεξιπτωτιστών)
  - Mountain Raiders Company (Λόχος Ορεινών Καταδρομών)
- Navy
  - Underwater Demolition Command (Διοίκηση Υποβρυχίων Καταστροφών)
- Air Force
  - 31st Search and Rescue Operations Squadron "Achilles" (31η Μοίρα Επιχειρήσεων Έρευνας Διάσωσης "Αχιλλέας")

== Guatemala ==
- Special Operations Brigade "Brigadier Pablo Nuila Hub" (Brigada de Operaciones Especiales "General de Brigada Pablo Nuila Hub")
  - Special Forces Battalion "Kaibiles" (Batallón de Fuerzas Especiales "Kaibiles")
- Parachute Brigade "General Felipe Cruz" (Brigada de Paracaidistas "General Felipe Cruz")
  - 1st Parachute Battalion (I Batallón de Paracaidistas)
  - 2nd Parachute Battalion (II Batallón de Paracaidistas)
  - Military Parachutist School (Escuela Militar de Paracaidismo)

== Guinea ==
- Commando Special Battalion (Bataillon Speciale des Commandos)
- Independent Airborne Troops Battalion (Bataillon Autonome des Troupes Aéroportées)

== Guyana ==
- 31 Special Forces Squadron

== Honduras ==
- Special Operations Command (Comando de Operaciones Especiales)
  - 1st Special Forces Battalion (1º Batallón de Fuerzas Especiales)
  - 2nd Airborne Infantry Battalion (Special Tactical Group) (2º Batallón de Infantería Aerotransportado (Agrupamiento Táctico Especial))
- Armed Forces Parachutist School (Escuela de Paracaidismo de las Fuerzas Armadas)

== Hungary ==
- HDF 2nd vitéz Bertalan Árpád Special Operations Brigade
  - HDF 34th Bercsényi László Special Forces Battalion
  - HDF 88th Light Mixed Battalion
- Deep Reconnaissance Company, HDF 24. Bornemissza Gergely Reconnaissance Regiment
- HDF 86th Szolnok Helicopter Base Special Parachute Training Group

== India ==
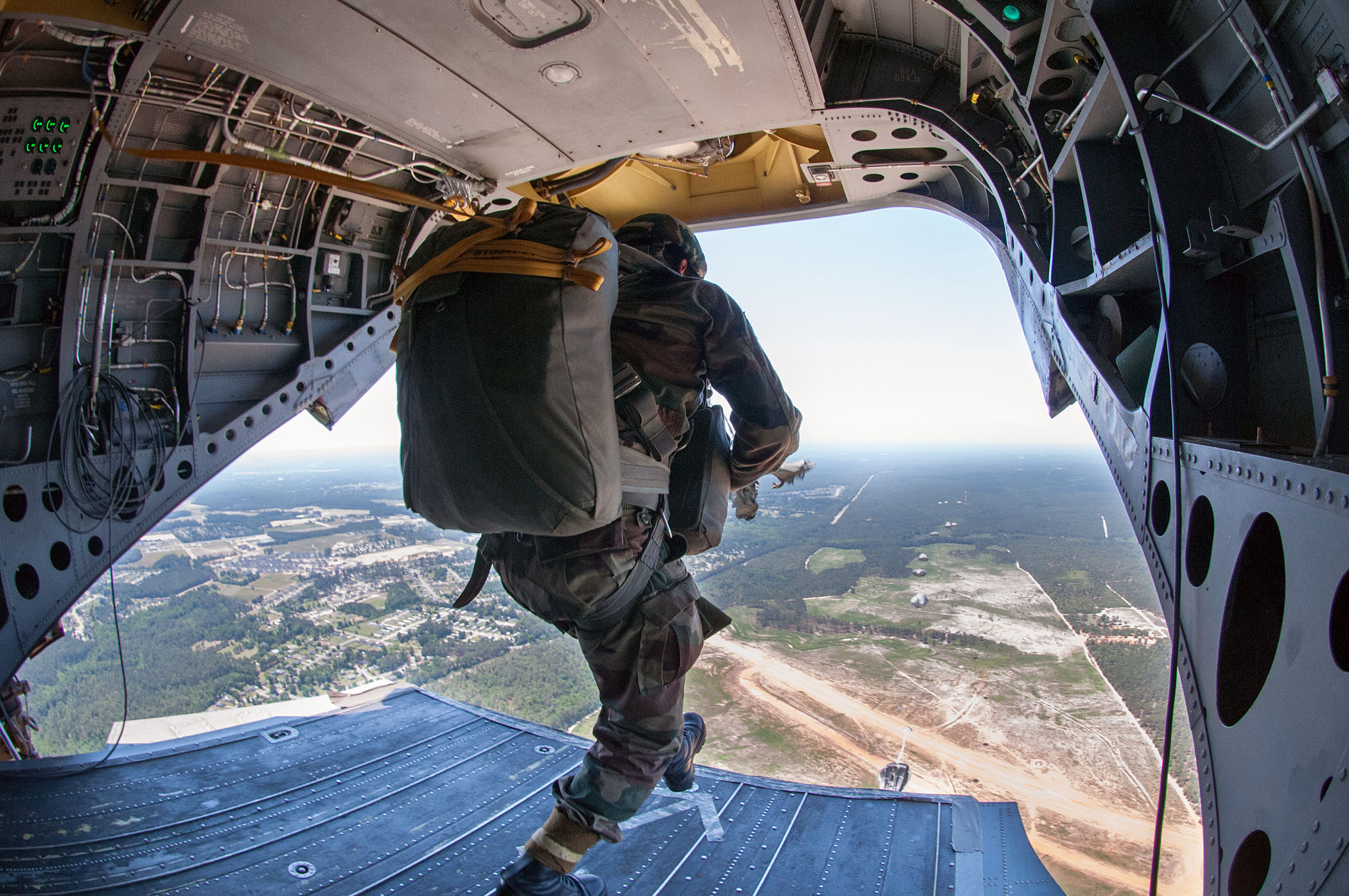
An Indian Army paratrooper with the 50th Independent Para Brigade exits a CH47 Chinook helicopter during a partnered airborne training exercise with U.S. Army paratroopers in 2013

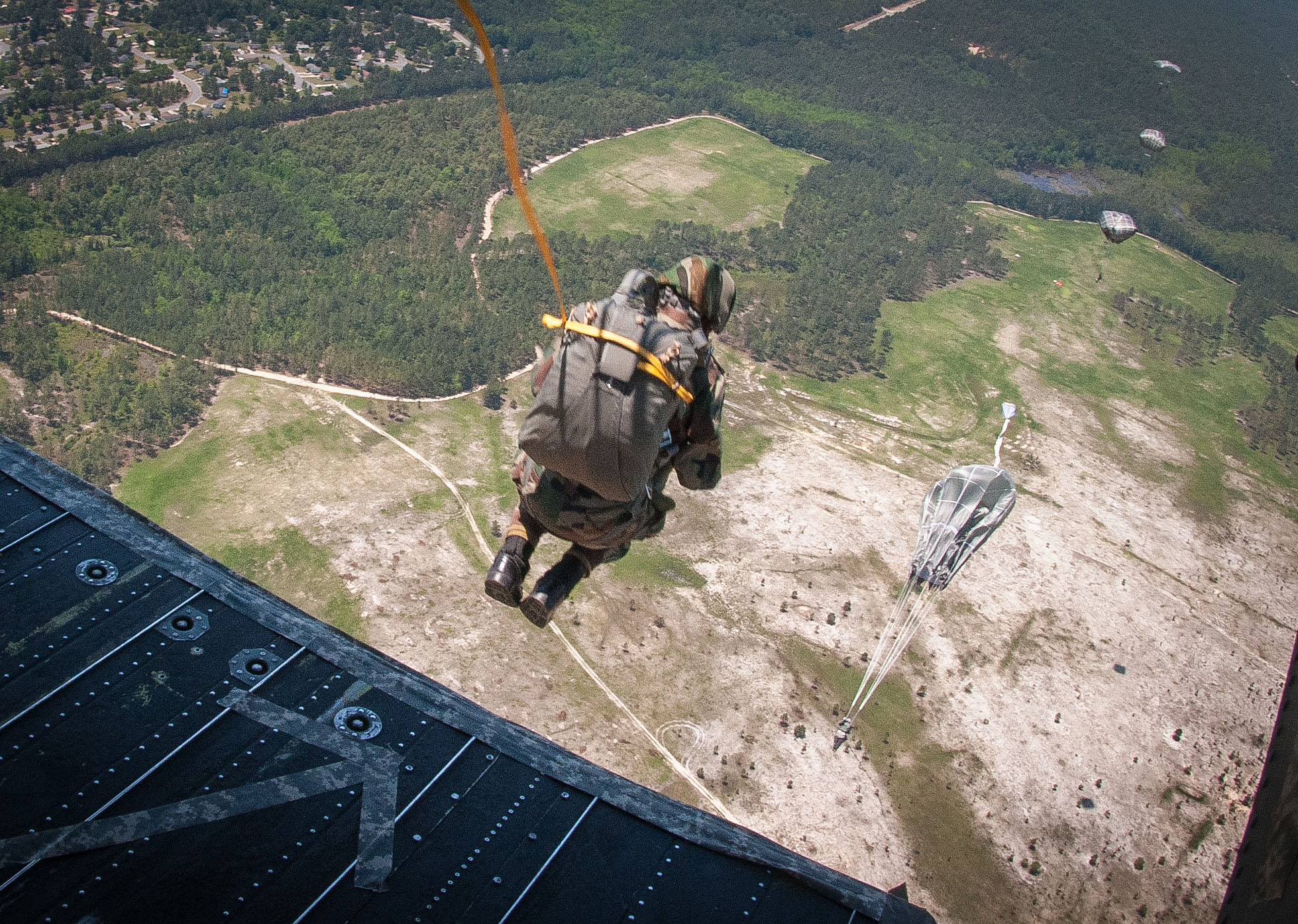
A soldier of Army 50th Parachute Brigade jumps from a Chinook helicopter

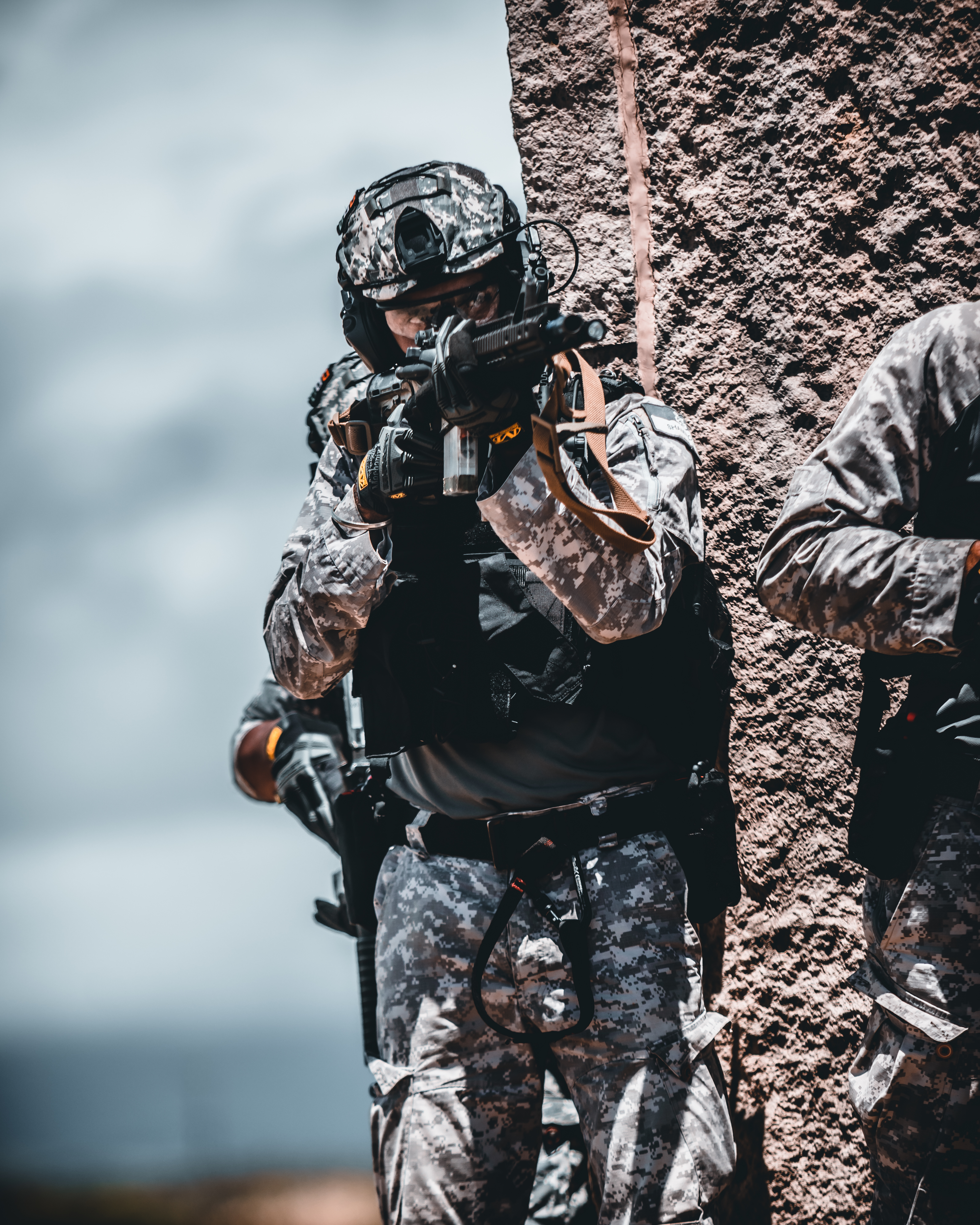
Indian Navy MARCOS during urban combat training at RIMPAC 2022

- Army
  - Para (Special Forces)
  - 50th Parachute Brigade
    - two Parachute Battalions (on rotation from the Parachute Regiment units listed below)
    - one Parachute Special Forces Battalion (on rotation from the Parachute Regiment units listed below)
    - one Parachute Field Regiment (Artillery) (on rotation from the Parachute Artillery units listed below)
    - 60th Parachute Field Hospital
    - 411th (Independent) Parachute Field Company, Bombay Sappers
    - 622 Parachute Composite Company (Army Service Corps)
    - 50th (Independent) Parachute Brigade (Ordnance Field Park)
    - 50th (Independent) Parachute Brigade Signal Company
    - 2 (Independent) Parachute Field Workshop Company (Electronics and Mechanical Engineers)
    - 252 (Para) Air Defence Battery
    - 50th (Independent) Parachute Brigade Provost Section
    - President's Body Guard Pathfinder Company
  - Parachute Regiment (पैराशूट रेजिमेंट )
    - Parachute Special Forces Battalions (पैरा स्पेशल फोर्सेज़ )
      - 1st battalion - 1 PARA (SF)
      - 2nd battalion - 2 PARA (SF)
      - 3rd battalion - 3 PARA (SF)
      - 4th battalion - 4 PARA (SF)
      - 9th battalion - 9 PARA (SF)
      - 10th battalion - 10 PARA (SF)
      - 11th battalion - 11 PARA (SF)
      - 12th battalion - 12 PARA (SF)
      - 13th battalion - 13 PARA (SF)
      - 21st battalion - 21 PARA (SF)
    - Parachute Airborne Battalions (पैराशूट बटालियन )
      - 5th battalion - 5 PARA (SF/Airborne)
      - 6th battalion - 6 PARA (SF/Airborne)
      - 7th battalion - 7 PARA (SF/Airborne)
      - 23rd battalion - 23 PARA (SF/Airborne)
      - 29th battalion - 29 PARA (SF/Airborne)
    - Parachute Battalions (Territorial Army) (पैराशूट बटालियन (प्रादेशिक सेना) )
      - 106th Infantry Battalion (Territorial Army) (based at Bengaluru, Karnataka)
      - 116th Infantry Battalion (Territorial Army) (based at Devlali, Maharashtra)
    - 31st Battalion - 31 PARA (Commando), Rashtriya Rifles (31. बटालियन (कमांडो), राष्ट्रीय राइफल्स )
  - 9th Parachute Field Artillery Regiment
  - 17th Parachute Field Artillery Regiment
- Navy
  - Marine Commando Force (मरीन कमांडो फोर्स )
- Air Force
  - "Garuda" Commando (गरुड़ कमांडो )
  - Paratroopers Training School (पैराट्रूपर्स ट्रेनिंग स्कूल )

== Indonesia ==
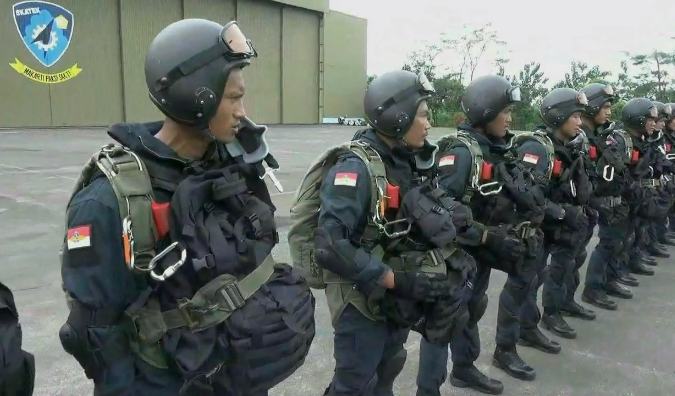
Indonesian Air Force Parachute Commandos

- Army
  - Special Forces Command (Komando Pasukan Khusus)
    - 1st Parachute Commando Group (Grup 1 Para Komando)
      - 11th Parachute Commando Battalion (Batalyon Para Komando 11)
      - 12th Parachute Commando Battalion (Batalyon Para Komando 12)
      - 13th Parachute Commando Battalion (Batalyon Para Komando 13)
      - 14th Parachute Commando Battalion (Batalyon Para Komando 14)
    - 2nd Parachute Commando Group (Grup 2 Para Komando)
      - 21st Parachute Commando Battalion (Batalyon Para Komando 21)
      - 22nd Parachute Commando Battalion (Batalyon Para Komando 22)
      - 23rd Parachute Commando Battalion (Batalyon Para Komando 23)
    - Special Forces Instruction and Training Unit (Satuan Pendikan dan Latihan Pasukan Khusus)
    - 81st Special Forces Counterterrorism Unit (Satuan Penanggulangang Teror 81 Pasukan Khusus)
  - Army Strategic Command (Komando Strategis Angkatan Darat)
    - 1st Infantry Division (Divisi Infanteri 1)
      - 17th Airborne Infantry Brigade (Brigade Infanteri Lintas Udara 17)
        - 305th Para Raider Infantry Battalion (Batalyon Infanteri Para Raider 305)
        - 328th Para Raider Infantry Battalion (Batalyon Infanteri Para Raider 328)
        - 330th Para Raider Infantry Battalion (Batalyon Infanteri Para Raider 330)
    - 2nd Infantry Division (Divisi Infanteri 2)
      - 18th Airborne Infantry Brigade (Brigade Infanteri Lintas Udara 18)
        - 501st Para Raider Infantry Battalion (Batalyon Infanteri Para Raider 501)
        - 502nd Para Raider Infantry Battalion (Batalyon Infanteri Para Raider 502)
        - 503rd Para Raider Infantry Battalion (Batalyon Infanteri Para Raider 503)
    - 3rd Infantry Division (Divisi Infanteri 3)
      - 3rd Airborne Infantry Brigade (Brigade Infanteri Lintas Udara 3)
        - 431st Para Raider Infantry Battalion (Batalyon Infanteri Para Raider 431)
        - 432nd Para Raider Infantry Battalion (Batalyon Infanteri Para Raider 432)
        - 433rd Para Raider Infantry Battalion (Batalyon Infanteri Para Raider 433)
    - Combat Reconnaissance Platoon (Peleton Intai Tempur)
- Navy
  - "Prawn Net" Detachment (Detasemen Jala Mangkara)
- Air Force
  - Quick Reaction Special Forces Corps (Korps Pasukan Gerak Cepat)
    - "Bravo 90" Detachment (Satuan "Bravo 90")
    - 1st Special Forces Wing (Danwing I Pasukan Khas)
      - 461st Parachute Commando Battalion (Prajurit Batalyon Komando 461)
      - 463rd Parachute Commando Battalion (Prajurit Batalyon Komando 463)
      - 467th Parachute Commando Battalion (Prajurit Batalyon Komando 467)
    - 2nd Special Forces Wing ( Danwing II Pasukan Khas)
      - 464th Parachute Commando Battalion (Prajurit Batalyon Komando 464)
      - 466th Parachute Commando Battalion (Prajurit Batalyon Komando 466)
      - 468th Parachute Commando Battalion (Prajurit Batalyon Komando 468)
    - 3rd Special Forces Wing (Danwing III Pasukan Khas)
      - 462nd Parachute Commando Battalion (Prajurit Batalyon Komando 462)
      - 465th Parachute Commando Battalion (Prajurit Batalyon Komando 465)
      - 469th Parachute Commando Battalion (Prajurit Batalyon Komando 469)

== Iran ==
- Army
  - 55th Airborne Brigade (تیپ ۵۵ هوابرد )
    - 126th Airborne Battalion (گردان هوابرد ۱۲۶ )
    - 135th Airborne Battalion (گردان هوابرد ۱۳۵ )
    - 146th Airborne Battalion (گردان هوابرد ۱۴۶)
  - 65th Airborne Special Forces Brigade (تیپ ۶۵ نیروهای ویژه هوابرد )
  - Army Ranger and Parachuting School (کمیته تکاور و چتربازی ارتش )
- Revolutionary Guards
  - 33rd Al-Mahdi Airborne Brigade (تیپ ۳۳ هوابرد المهدی )
  - تیپ_۶۶_نیروهای_ویژه_هوابرد 66th Airborne Special Forces Brigade
  - "Sabre" Special Brigade (یگان ویژه صابرین )
  - Sepah Navy Special Force (نیروی ویژه دریایی سپاه )

== Ireland ==
- Army Ranger Wing (Sciathán Fiannóglaigh an Airm)

== Israel ==
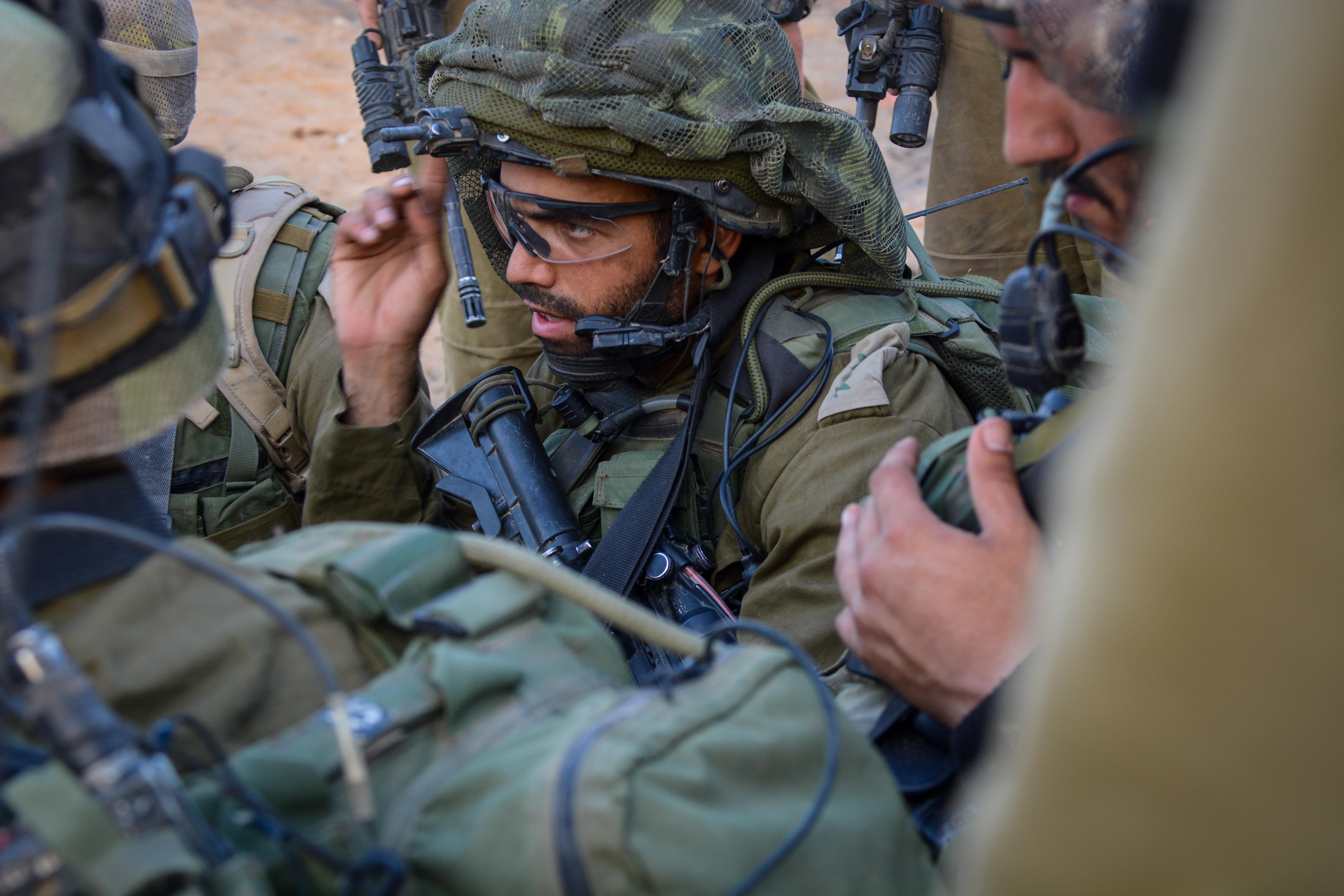
Israeli paratroopers in operation in the Gaza Strip

- Army
  - 98th Parachute Division (Reserve) "Fire Formation"
    - 35th Parachute Brigade "Flying Serpent"
      - 101st Parachute Battalion "Cobra"
      - 202nd Parachute Battalion "Viper"
      - 890th Parachute Battalion "Adder"
      - 5135th Reconnaissance Battalion "Flying Serpent"
    - 55th Parachute Brigade (Reserve) "Tip of the Spear"
      - 7063rd Parachute Battalion
      - 8150th Parachute Battalion
      - 9264th Parachute Battalion
      - 8171st Reconnasissance Battalion
    - 551st Parachute Brigade (Reserve) "Arrows of Fire"
      - 697th Parachute Battalion
      - 699th Parachute Battalion
      - 7008th Parachute Battalion
    - 89th Commando Brigade "Courage"
      - Unit 212 - Maglan ("Ibis")
      - Unit 217 - Duvdevan ("Cherry")
      - Unit 621 - Egoz ("Walnut")
  - 146th Armored Division (Reserve) "Bang"
    - 226th Parachute Brigade (Reserve) "Eagle Formation" (Otzvat Nesher)
      - 7056th Parachute Battalion
      - 9255th Parachute Battalion
      - 9263rd Parachute Battalion
  - 99th Infantry Division (Reserve) "Flash"
    - 646th Parachute Brigade (Reserve) "Sky Foxes"
      - 420th Parachute Battalion
      - 466th Parachute Battalion
      - 8105th Parachute Battalion
  - Engineering Unit for Special Tasks "Diamond"
  - Unit 269 - Sayeret Matkal - General Staff Reconnaissance Unit
  - Parachute School
- Air Force
  - 7th Wing
    - Unit 5101 - Shaldag Unit "Kingfisher"
    - Search and Rescue Flight 669
- Navy
  - Shayetet 13 (Flotilla 13)

== Italy ==
Italian paratrooper brevet

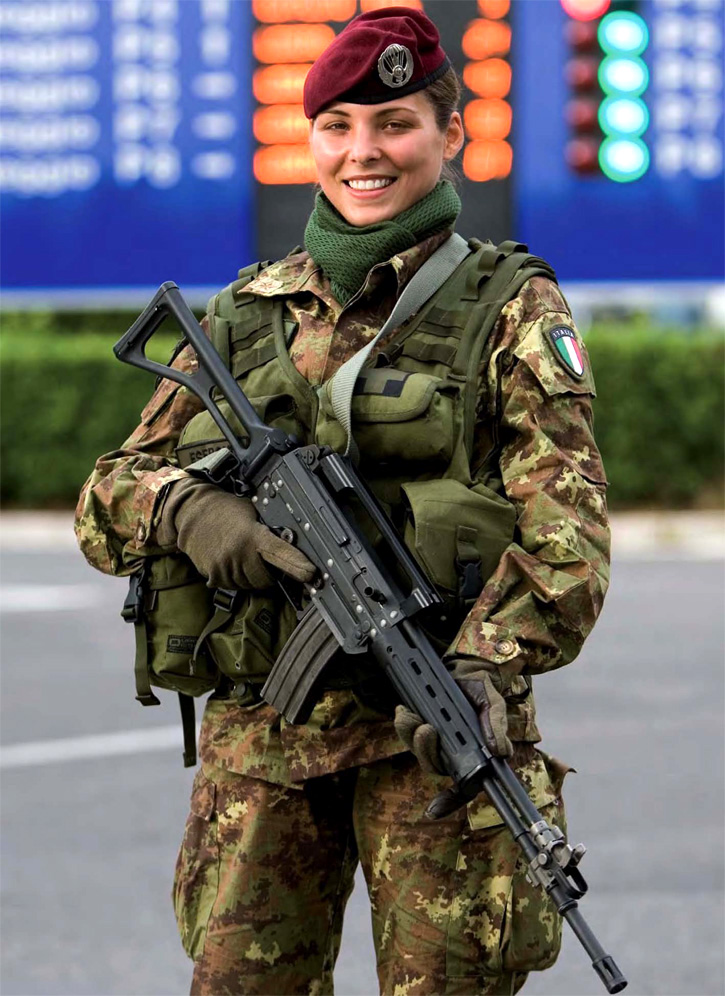
Italian female paratrooper

- Army
  - Folgore Parachute Brigade (Brigata Paracadutisti "Folgore")
    - 183rd Paratroopers Regiment "Nembo" (183º Reggimento Paracadutisti "Nembo")
      - 1st Paratroopers Battalion "Grizzano" (1º Battaglione Paracadutisti "Grizzano")
    - 186th Paratroopers Regiment "Folgore" (186º Reggimento Paracadutisti "Folgore")
      - 5º Battaglione paracadutisti "El Alamein" (5th Paratroopers Battalion "El Alamein")
    - 187th Paratroopers Regiment "Lightning" (187º Reggimento Paracadutisti "Folgore")
      - 2nd Paratroopers Battalion "Tarquinia" (2º Battaglione Paracadutisti "Tarquinia")
    - Regiment "Savoia Cavalleria" (3rd) (Reggimento "Savoia Cavalleria" (3º))
    - 8th Parachute Demolition Engineers Regiment "Lightning" (8º Reggimento Genio Guastatori Paracadutisti "Folgore")
    - 185th Paratroopers Artillery Regiment "Folgore" (185º Reggimento Artiglieria Paracadutisti "Folgore")
      - 1st Paratroopers Artillery Group "Viterbo" (1º Gruppo Artiglieria Paracadutisti "Viterbo")
    - Logistic Regiment "Folgore" (Reggimento Logistico "Folgore")
    - Headquarters and Tactical Supports Unit "Lightning" (Reparto Comando e Supporti Tattici "Folgore")
    - Parachuting Training Center (Centro Addestramento di Paracadutismo)
      - 3rd Paratroopers Battalion "Poggio Rusco" (3º Battaglione Paracadutisti "Poggio Rusco")
  - Army Special Forces Command (Comando delle Forze Speciali dell'Esercito)
    - 9th Paratroopers Assault Regiment "Moschin Hill" (9º Reggimento d'Assalto Paracadutisti "Col Moschin"),
      - 1st Raiders Battalion (1º Battaglione Incursori)
      - Raiders Training Unit (Reparto Addestramento Incursori)
      - Special Operations K9 Unit (Nucleo Cinofili per le Operazioni Speciali))
    - Special Operations Training Center (Centro Addestramento per Operazioni Speciali)
    - Special Operations Support Unit (Reparto Supporti alle Operazioni Speciali)
    - 4th Alpini Parachutist Regiment (4º Reggimento Alpini Paracadutisti)
      - Alpini Paratroopers Battalion "Monte Cervino"" (Battaglione Alpini Paracadutisti "Monte Cervino")
      - Alpini Paratroopers Battalion "Intra" - Operational Support Battalion (Battaglione Alpini Paracadutisti "Intra" - Battaglione Supporto Operativo)
    - 185th Paratroopers Reconnaissance Target Acquisition Regiment "Folgore" (185º Reggimento Paracadutisti Ricognizione Acquisizione Obiettivi "Folgore")
- Navy
  - Comando Raggruppamento Subacquei e Incursori Teseo Tesei (Raggruppamento Subacquei e Incursori "Teseo Tesei")
    - Operational Raiders Group (Gruppo Operativo Incursori)
    - Submarine Parachute Assistance Section of the Operational Divers Group (Nucleo SPAG del Gruppo Operativo Subacquei)
  - 1st San Marco Regiment (1º Reggimento Marina "San Marco")
    - Parachute Swimmers Company (Compagnia Nuotatori Paracadutisti)
- Air Force
  - 17º Stormo Incursori
    - Raiders Group (Gruppo Incursori)
- Carabinieri
  - 1st Paratroopers Carabinieri Regiment "Tuscania" (1º Reggimento Carabinieri Paracadutisti "Tuscania")
    - 1st Carabinieri Paratroopers Battalion "Eluet el Asel" (1º Battaglione Carabinieri Paracadutisti "Eluet el Asel")
  - Gruppo di intervento speciale

== Ivory Coast ==
- 1st Commando Parachutists Battalion (1er Bataillon des Commandos Parachutistes)

== Japan ==
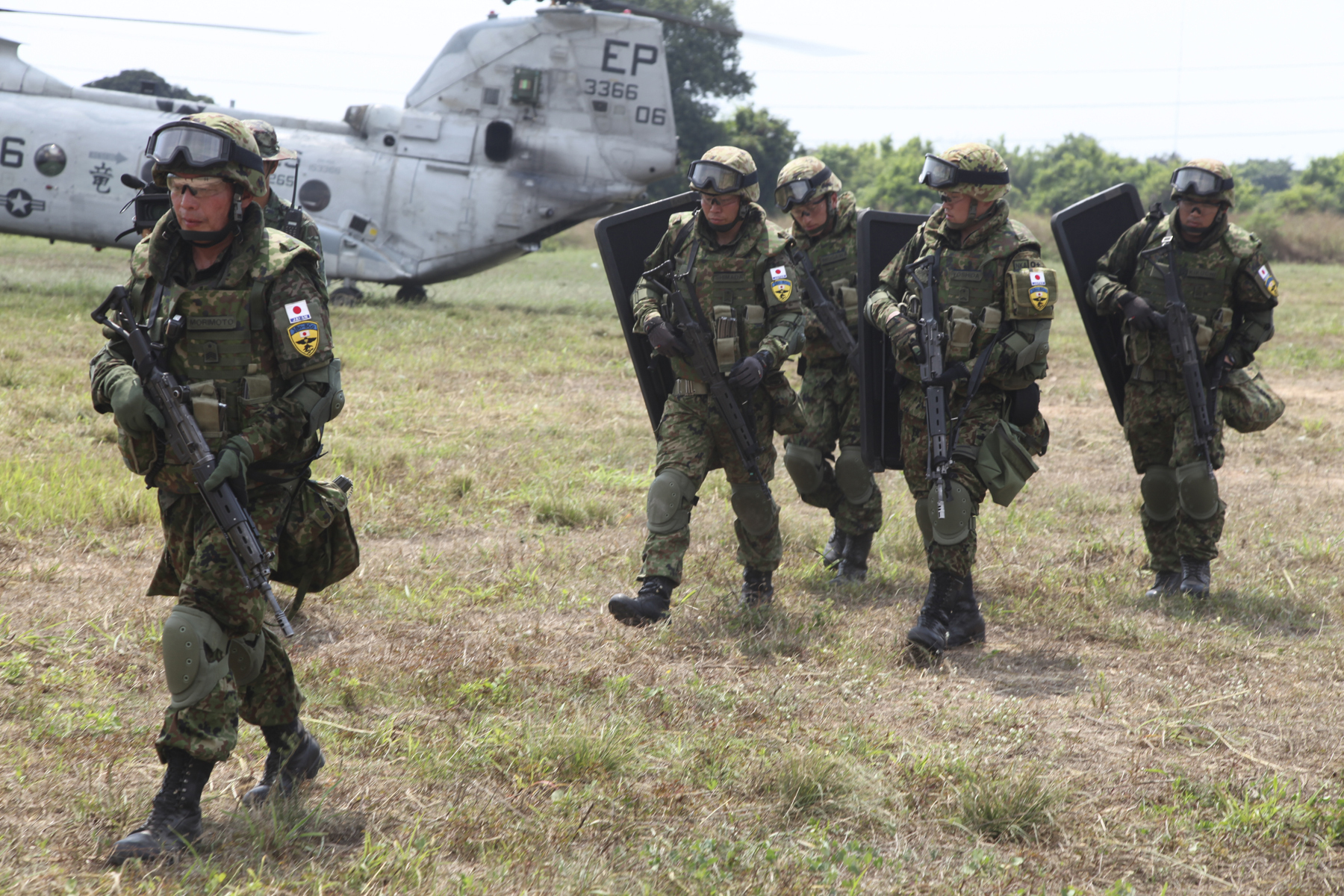
Japanese paratroopers of B Company, 3rd Battalion, 2012

- Japan Ground Self-Defense Force
  - Ground Component Command (陸上総隊)
    - 1st Airborne Brigade (第1空挺団)
      - Headquarters Company (団本部中隊 ), including:
        - Reconnaissance Company (偵察小隊 )
        - Landing Guidance Company (降下誘導小隊 )
      - 1st Infantry Battalion(Airborne (第1普通科大隊 )
      - 2nd Infantry Battalion(Airborne) (第2普通科大隊 )
      - 3rd Infantry Battalion(Airborne) (第3普通科大隊 )
      - Airborne Artillery Battalion (空挺特科大隊 ) (Note: Mortars unit.)
      - Airborne Logistic Support Troop (空挺後方支援隊 )
      - Signal Company (通信中隊 -)
      - Engineer Company (施設中隊 )
      - Airborne Training Unit (空挺教育隊 )
    - Special Operations Group (特殊作戦群 )
- Japan Maritime Self-Defense Force
  - Special Boarding Unit (特別警備隊 )
- Japan Air Self-Defense Force
  - Pararescue detachments, Air Rescue Wing (航空救難団 )

== Jordan ==
- Royal Special Operation Forces Group "King Abdullah II"
  - 1st Special Unit
  - 2nd Special Unit
- Rapid Intervention Brigade "Sheikh Muhamad bin Zayid Al Nahyan" ( لواء الشيخ محمد بن زايد آل نهيان التدخل السريع )
  - 61st Rapid Intervention Battalion - Raiders (كتيبة التدخل السريع / 61 المغاوير )
  - 81st Rapid Intervention Battalion (كتيبة التدخل السريع/81 )
  - 91st Rapid Intervention Battalion (كتيبة التدخل السريع/91 )

== Kazakhstan ==
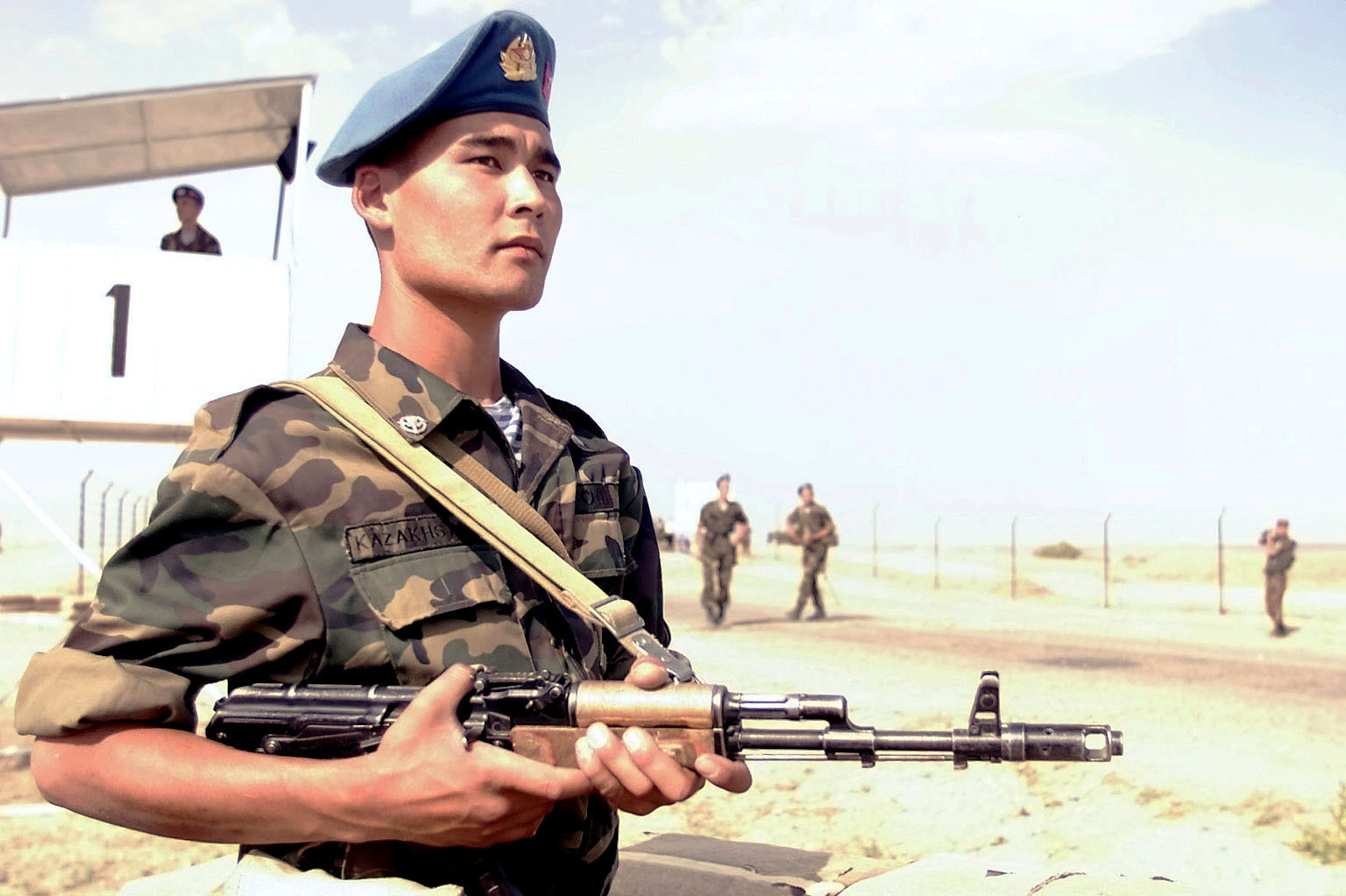
Kazakhstan paratrooper

- Air Assault Forces ( Десанттық-шабуылдаушы Әскерлері)
  - 35th Independent Guards Air Assault Brigade (35-ші жеке гвардиялық десанттық-шабуылдаушы бригадасы )
  - 36th Independent Air Assault Brigade (36-ші жеке десанттық-шабуылдаушы бригадасы )
  - 37th Independent Air Assault Brigade (37-ші жеке десанттық-шабуылдаушы бригадасы )
  - 38th Independent Air Assault Brigade (38-ші жеке десанттық-шабуылдаушы бригадасы )
  - Independent Intelligence Battalion
  - Independent Signal Battalion

== Kenya ==
Special Operations Regiment (Kenya)

- 20th Parachute Battalion
- 30th Special Operations Battalion
- 40th Rangers Strike Force.

== Korea (Democratic People’s Republic of Korea/“North Korea”) ==
- Army
  - 26th Air Landing Brigade (제26항공육전여단 - je26 Hang Gong Yugjeon Yeodan)
  - 38th Air Landing Brigade (제38항공육전여단 - je38 Hang Gong Yugjeon Yeodan)
  - 45th Air Landing Brigade (제45항공육전여단 - je45 Hang Gong Yugjeon Yeodan)
  - 48th Air Landing Brigade (제48항공육전여단 - je48 Hang Gong Yugjeon Yeodan)
  - 58th Air Landing Brigade (제58항공육전여단 - je58 Hang Gong Yugjeon Yeodan)
  - 525th Special Operations Battalion (제525특수작전대대 - je525 Teugsujagjeondaedae)
- Air Force
  - 11th Airborne Snipers Brigade (제11항공저격여단 - je11 Hang Gongjeogyeog Yeodan)
  - 16th Airborne Snipers Brigade (제16항공저격여단 - je16 Hang Gongjeogyeog Yeodan)
  - 21st Airborne Snipers Brigade (제21항공저격여단 - je21 Hang Gongjeogyeog Yeodan)
- Korean People's Army Special Operation Force

== Korea (Republic of Korea/“South Korea”) ==
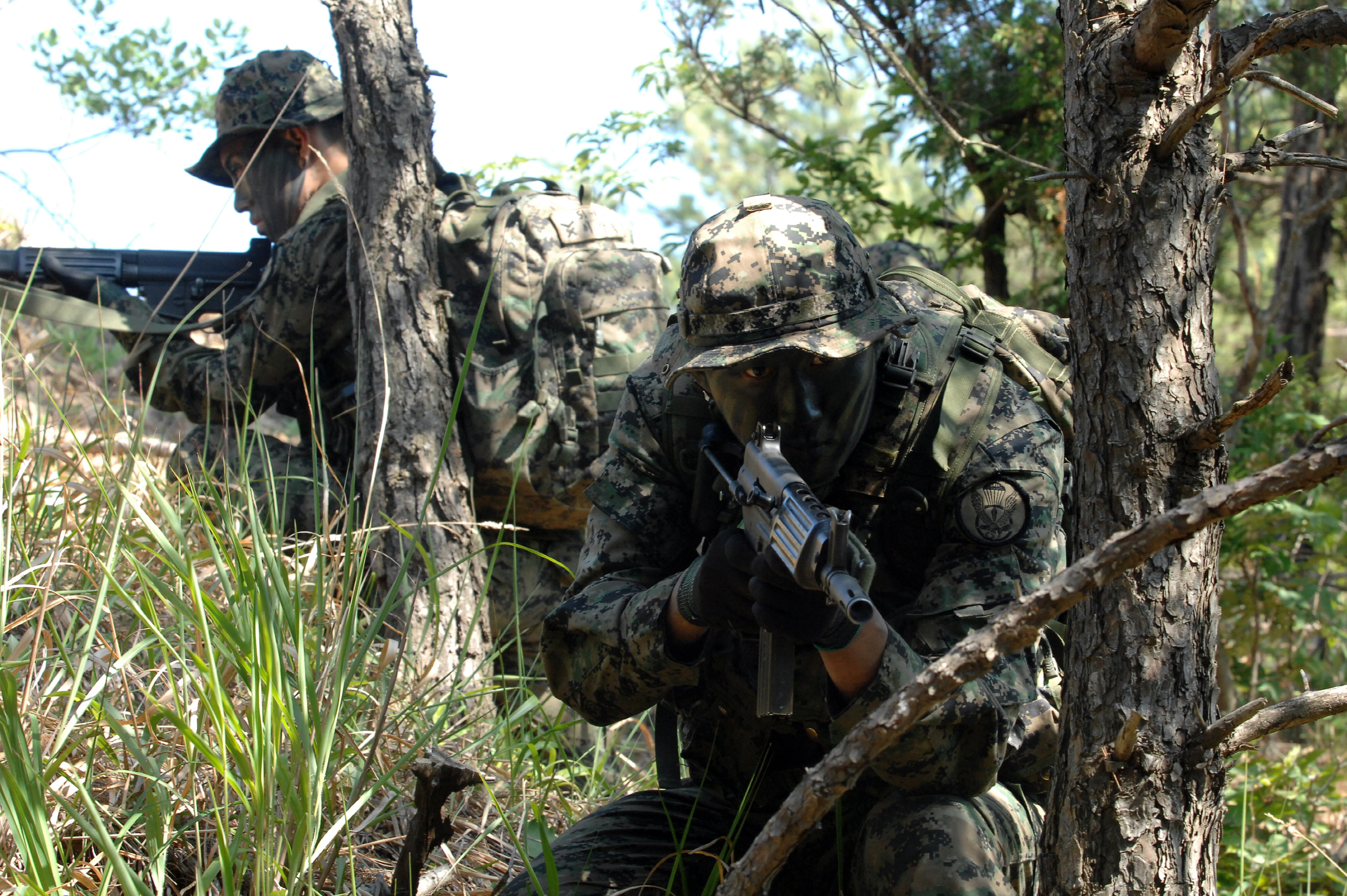
South Korea paratroopers in training, 2015

- Army
  - Army Special Forces Command "Lion" (육군특수전사령부 "사자" - Yuggunteugsujeonsalyeongbu "Saja")
    - 1st Airborne Special Forces Brigade "Eagle"
      - 1st Special Forces Battalion (제1특전대대 - je 1 Teugjeon Daedae)
      - 2nd Special Forces Battalion (제2특전대대 - je 2 Teugjeon Daedae)
      - 3rd Special Forces Battalion (제3특전대대 - je 3 Teugjeon Daedae)
      - 5th Special Forces Battalion (제5특전대대 - je 5 Teugjeon Daedae)
    - 3rd Airborne Special Forces Brigade "Flying Tiger" (3 공수특전여단 "비호" - 3 Gongsuteugjeon-Yeodan "Biho")
      - 11th Special Forces Battalion (제11특전대대 - je 11 Teugjeon Daedae)
      - 12th Special Forces Battalion (제12특전대대 - je 12 Teugjeon Daedae)
      - 13th Special Forces Battalion (제13특전대대 - je 13 Teugjeon Daedae)
      - 15th Special Forces Battalion (제15특전대대 - je 15 Teugjeon Daedae)
    - 7th Airborne Special Forces Brigade "Pegasus" (7공수특전여단 "천마" - 7 Gongsuteugjeon-Yeodan "Cheonma")
      - 31st Special Forces Battalion (제31특전대대 - je 31 Teugjeon Daedae)
      - 32nd Special Forces Battalion (제32특전대대 - je 32 Teugjeon Daedae)
      - 33rd Special Forces Battalion (제33특전대대 - je 33 Teugjeon Daedae)
      - 35th Special Forces Battalion (제35특전대대 - je 35 Teugjeon Daedae)
    - 9th Airborne Special Forces Brigade "Ghost" (9 공수특전여단 "유령" - 9 Gongsuteugjeon-Yeodan "Yulyeong")
      - 51st Special Forces Battalion (제51특전대대 - je 51 Teugjeon Daedae)
      - 52nd Special Forces Battalion (제52특전대대 - je 52 Teugjeon Daedae)
      - 53rd Special Forces Battalion (제53특전대대 - je 53 Teugjeon Daedae)
      - 55th Special Forces Battalion (제55특전대대 - je 55 Teugjeon Daedae)
    - 11th Airborne Special Forces Brigade "Golden Bat" (11 공수특전여단 "황금박쥐" - 11 Gongsuteugjeon-Yeodan "Hhwang-Geumbagjwi")
      - 61st Special Forces Battalion (제61특전대대 - je 61 Teugjeon Daedae)
      - 62nd Special Forces Battalion (제62특전대대 - je 62 Teugjeon Daedae)
      - 63rd Special Forces Battalion (제63특전대대 - je 63 Teugjeon Daedae)
      - 65th Special Forces Battalion (제65특전대대 - je 65 Teugjeon Daedae)
    - 13th Airborne Special Missions Brigade "Black Panther" (13 특수임무여단 "흑표" - 13 Teugsu-Immuyeodan "Heugpyo)
      - 71st Special Missions Battalion (제71특수임무대대 - je 71 Teugsu-Immu Daedae)
      - 72nd Special Missions Battalion (제72특수임무대대 - je 72 Teugsu-Immu Daedae)
      - 73rd Special Missions Battalion (제73특수임무대대 - je 73 Teugsu-Immu Daedae)
      - 75th Special Missions Battalion (제75특수임무대대 - je 75 Teugsu-Immu Daedae)
    - International Peace Support Group "All World" (국제평화지원단 (온누리) – Gugjepyeonghwajiwondan "Onnuri")
  - 201st Special Operations Brigade "Golden Eagle" (201특공여단 "황금독수리" 201 Teuggong-Yeodan "Hwang-Geumdogsuli")
  - 203rd Special Operations Brigade "Tiger Dragon" (203 특공여단 "용호" - 203 Teuggong-Yeodan "Yongho")
  - 707th Special Mission Battalion "White Tiger" (707특수임무대대 "백호" - 707 Teugsu-Immu Daedae "Baegho")
  - Republic of Korea Army Ground Operations Command (지상작전사령부" - Jisangjagjeonsalyeongbu)
    - VII Maneuver Corps (7기동군단" - 7 Gidong-gundan)
      - 2nd Quick Response Division (제2신속대응사단" - Je 2 Sinsogdaeeungsadan)
- Navy
  - Special Warfare Flotilla (해군 특수전전단 - Haegun Teugsujeonjeondan)
- Marines
  - 21st Airborne Expeditionary Battalion (제21공정대대 - je21Gongjeongdaedae)
  - 31st Airborne Expeditionary Battalion (제31공정대대 - je31Gongjeongdaedae)
  - 73rd Airborne Expeditionary Battalion (제73공정대대 - je73Gongjeongdaedaee)

== Kuwait ==
- one Special Forces Unit

== Kyrgyzstan ==
- Army
  - 24th Independent Special Purpose Battalion "Snow Leopard" (Өзгөчө Бригада Ой-ниети Жөнүндө 25-Өзүнчө "Илбирс")
  - 25th Independent Special Purpose Brigade "Scorpion" (Өзгөчө Бригада Ой-ниети Жөнүндө 25-Өзүнчө )
- National Guard
  - Special Forces Battalion "Panther" (Батталион Атайын Көздөлгөн "Чайка" )

== Latvia ==
- Special Operations Command (Speciālo Operāciju Pavēlniecība)
  - Special Task Unit (Speciālo Uzdevumu Vienība)

== Lesotho ==
- one "Recce" (Special Forces) unit

== Lithuania ==
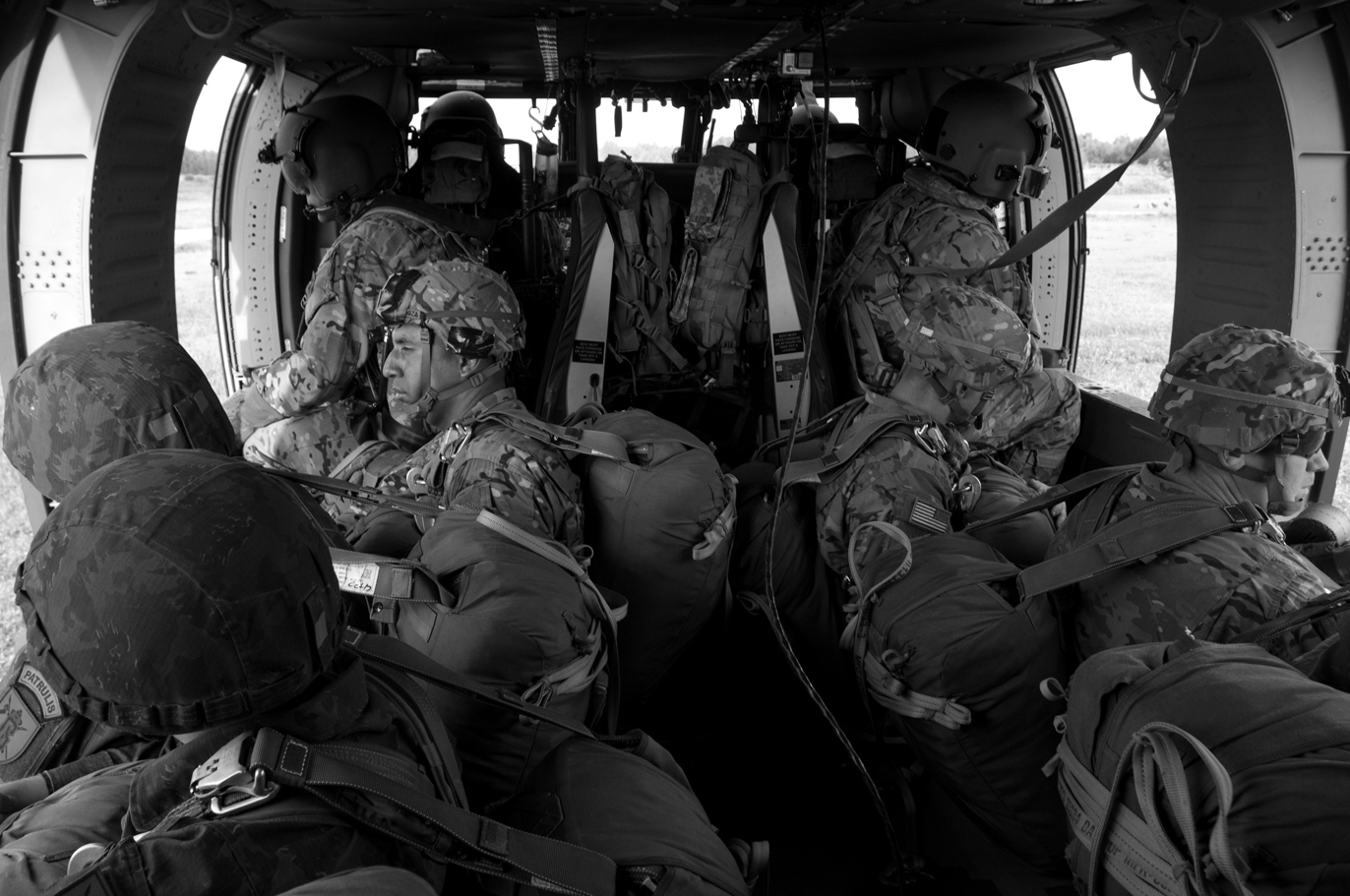
Lithuanian parachute scouts of the "Iron Wolf" brigade train with US paratroopers of the 172nd IBCT

- Grand Duke Gediminas Staff Battalion
  - Reconnaissance Platoon
- Army
  - "Iron Wolf" Infantry Brigade
    - Reconnaissance Company (Žvalgų kuopa, Pėstininkų Brigada "Geležinis Vilkas")
    - King Mindaugas Mechanized infantry Hussar Battalion
      - Reconnaissance Platoon
    - Grand Duchess Birutė Mechanized infantry Uhlan Battalion
      - Reconnaissance Platoon
    - Grand Duke Algirdas Mechanized Infantry Battalion
      - Reconnaissance Platoon
    - Duke Vaidotas Mechanized Infantry Battalion
      - Reconnaissance Platoon
  - "Griffin" (Samogitia) Infantry Brigade
    - Reconnaissance Company (Žvalgų kuopa, Pėstininkų Brigada "Žemaitija")
    - Grand Duke Butigeidis Dragoon Battalion
      - Reconnaissance Platoon
    - Grand Duke Kęstutis Infantry Battalion
      - Reconnaissance Platoon
    - Prince Margiris Infantry Battalion
      - Reconnaissance Platoon
  - "Aukštaitija" Light Infantry Brigade
    - Reconnaissance Company (Žvalgų kuopa, Lengvoji Pėstininkų Brigada "Aukštaitija")
    - 1st Infantry (Reserve) Battalion
      - Reconnaissance Platoon
    - 2nd Infantry (Reserve) Battalion
      - Reconnaissance Platoon
    - 3rd Infantry (Reserve) Battalion
      - Reconnaissance Platoon
  - Volunteer Forces
    - Reconnaissance Company (Žvalgų kuopa, Krašto Apsaugos Savanorių Pajėgos)
    - 1st Territorial Unit Dainava District
      - Reconnaissance Platoon
    - 2nd Territorial Unit Darius and Girėnas District
      - Reconnaissance Platoon
    - 3rd Territorial Unit Žemaičiai District
      - Reconnaissance Platoon
    - 5th Territorial Unit Vytis District
      - Reconnaissance Platoon
    - 6th Territorial Unit Prisikėlimo District
      - Reconnaissance Platoon
  - Major Juozas Lukša Training Center
    - Reconnaissance course
- Special Operations Force (Specialiųjų Operacijų Pajėgos)
  - Special Purpose Service (Ypatingos Paskirties Tarnyba)
  - Light Infantry Battalion "Vytautas the Great" (Vytauto Didžiojo Jėgerių Batalionas)
  - Combat Divers Service (Kovinių Narų Tarnyba)
  - Training and Combat Support Center (Mokymo ir Kovinės Paramos Centras)
- Training Command and Doctrine Command
  - Division General Stasys Raštikis Lithuanian Armed Forces School
    - Parachute Training Center (Parašiutinio Rengimo Centras)

== Macedonia (Republic of North Macedonia) ==
- Army
  - Regiment for Special Operations (Полк за специјални операции - Polk za Specijalni Operacii)
    - Battalion for Special Purposes "Wolves" (Баталјон за специјални намени "Волци" - Bataljon za Specijalni Nameni "Volci")
    - Rangers Battalion (Ренџерски баталјон - Rendžerski Bataljon)
- Air Force
  - 501st Special Purposes Platoon "Falcons" (501.Вод за Специални Намени "Соколи" - 501. Vod za Specijalne Razmene "Sokoli")

== Madagascar ==
- 1st Parachute Battalion (Malagasy: 1er Bataillon parachutiste, 1er BAT PARA)

== Malawi ==
- Parachute Battalion

== Malaysia ==
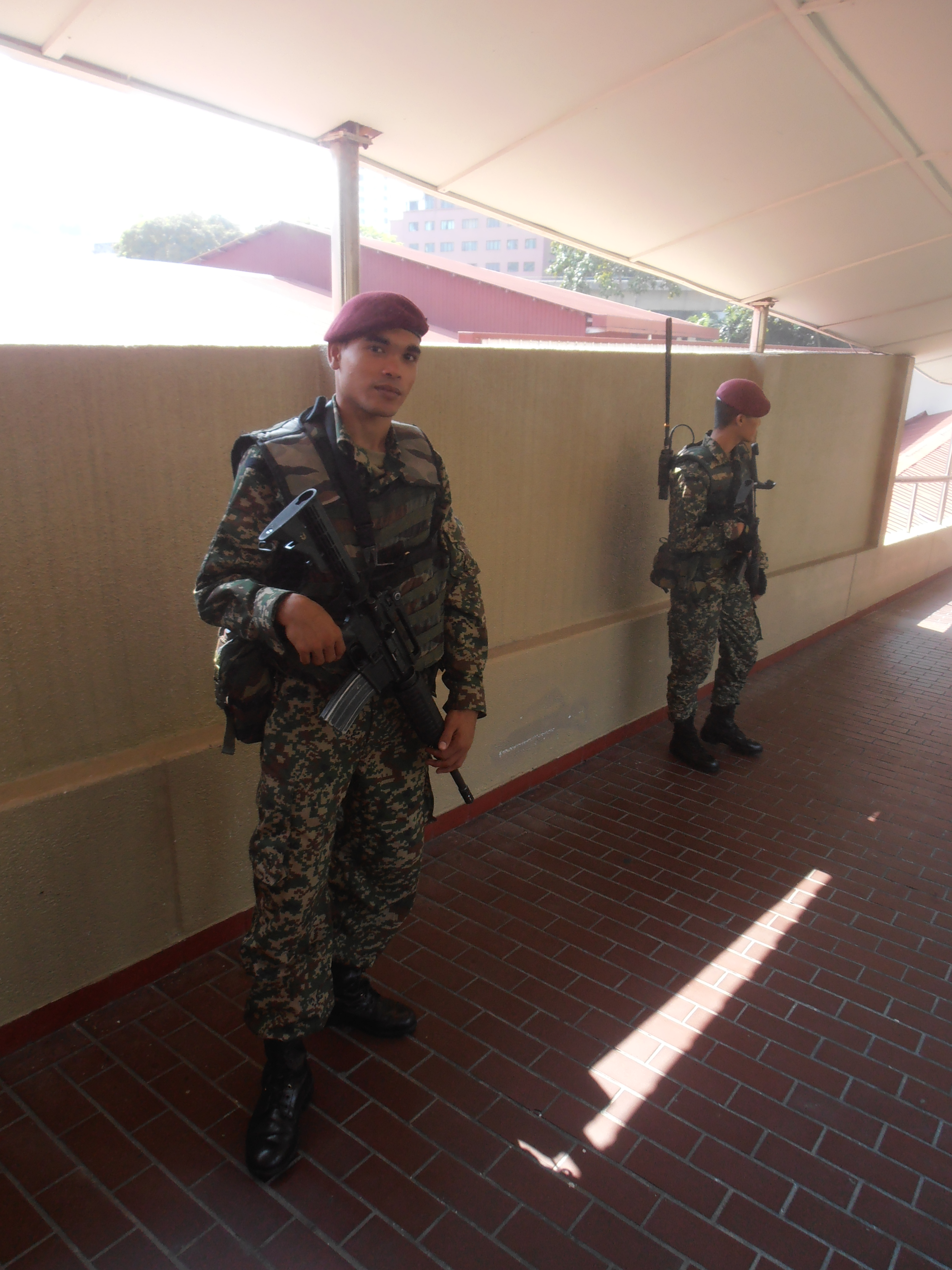
Malaysia parachutists from the 10th Parachute Brigade

- Army
  - 10th Parachute Brigade (Briged ke-10 Payung Terjun)
    - 8th Battalion Royal Ranger Regiment (Para) (Batalion ke-8 Rejimen Renjer Diraja (Para))
    - 9th Battalion Royal Malay Regiment (Para) (Batalion ke-9 Rejimen Askar Melayu Diraja (Para))
    - 17th Battalion Royal Malay Regiment (Para) (Batalion ke-17 Rejimen Askar Melayu Diraja (Para))
    - 18th Battalion Royal Malay Regiment (Para) (Batalion ke-18 Rejimen Askar Melayu Diraja (Para))
    - 1st Royal Artillery Regiment (Para) (Rejimen Pertama Artileri Diraja (Para))
    - Armoured Squadron (Para) (Skuadron Armor Diraja (Para))
    - 10th Squadron Royal Signals Regiment (Para) (10 Skuadron Semboyan Diraja (Para))
    - 361st Battery Air Defence Royal Artillery Regiment (Para) (361 Bateri Rejimen Artileri Diraja PU (Para))
    - 10th Squadron Royal Engineer Regiment (Para) (10 Skuadron Askar Jurutera Diraja (Para))
    - Pathfinder Platoon (Para) (Platun Pandu Udara (Para))
    - Support Company (Para) (Kompeni Bantuan (Para))
    - Royal Military Police Corps Platoon (Para) (Kor Polis Tentera Diraja (Para))
    - Royal Medical Corps Company (Para) (Kompeni Perubatan (Para))

== Maldives ==
- Special Forces unit

== Mali ==
- 33rd Parachute Commando Regiment (33ème Régiment des Commandos Parachutistes)

== Mauritania ==
- 1st Paratrooper and Commando Battalion (الكتيبة الأولى للصاعقة و المظليين - Alkatibat Al'uwlaa Lilssaeiqat w Almazaliyiyn)

== Mexico ==
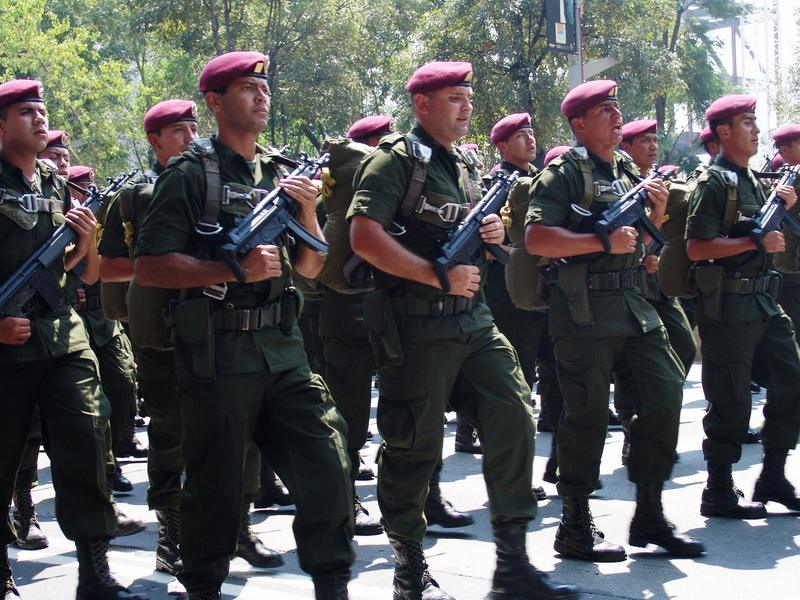
Parachute riflemen on parade in Mexico City

Secretariat of National Defense (SEDENA)

- Joint Special Operations Command (FEC)
  - A Squadron (Assault)
  - B Squadron (Assault)
  - C Squadron (Assault)
  - Support Units:
    - Special Force Unit (FE-BFP) of the Parachute Rifle Brigade
    - Special Reaction and Intervention Force (FERI-GN) of the National Guard

Army

- Parachute Rifle Brigade
  - Headquarters Company
  - 1st Parachute Rifle Battalion
  - 2nd Parachute Rifle Battalion
  - 3rd Parachute Rifle Battalion
  - 4th Logistics Company
- Parachutist Training Center

Navy

- Special Forces
  - Special Forces Group of the Gulf
  - Special Forces Group of the Pacific
  - Special Forces Group of the Center

== Moldova ==
- Special Purpose Battalion "Lightning" (Batalionul cu Destinaţie Specială "Fulger")
  - Special Purpose Company (Companie cu Destinaţie Specială)
  - Parachutist Company (Compania de Parașutiști)

== Mongolia ==
- 84th Air Landing Battalion (Aгаарын Десант 84-р Батальон - Agaaryn Dyesant 84-r Battalion)

== Montenegro ==
- Army
  - Special Forces Company (Чете Специјалних Снага - Čete Specijalnih Snaga)
- Navy
  - Naval Detachment ( Поморскi Одред - Pomorski Odred)

== Morocco ==
- 1st Parachute Infantry Brigade (لوائي جنود مظلات1 - Lwayiy Junud Mazallat 1)
- 2nd Parachute Infantry Brigade (لوائي جنود مظلات2 - Lwayiy Junud Mazallat 2)
- Royal Gendarmerie Parachute Intervention Squadron (Escadron Parachutiste d'Intervention de la Gendarmerie Royale)
- Airborne Troops Training Center (Centre d'Instruction des Troupes Aéroportés)

== Myanmar ==
- 4th Military Operation Command (4. စစ်ဆင်ရေးကွပ်ကဲမှုဌာနချုပ် - 4. cacchangre: kwapkaihmu thanakhyup)

== Namibia ==
- one Special Forces unit
- Parachute Training School

== Nepal ==
- Special Forces (No.10 Brigade) (विशेष सेना (न। १० ब्रिगेड) - Viśēṣa Sēnā (na.10 Brigēḍa))
  - 23rd Parachute Battalion "Shree Bhairavnath" (२३ प्यारासुट बटालियन "श्री भैरवनाथ" - 23 Pyārāsuṭa Baṭāliyana "Śrī Bhairavanātha")
  - Special Forces Battalion "Shree Yuddha Bhairav" (विशेष सेना बटालियन "श्रीयुद्ध भैरव" - Viśēṣa Sēnā Baṭāliyana "Śrī Yud'dha Bhairava")
- Para Training School (प्यारा प्रशिक्षण स्कूल - Pyārā Praśikṣaṇa Skūla)

== Netherlands ==
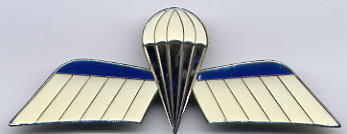
Dutch paratrooper brevet

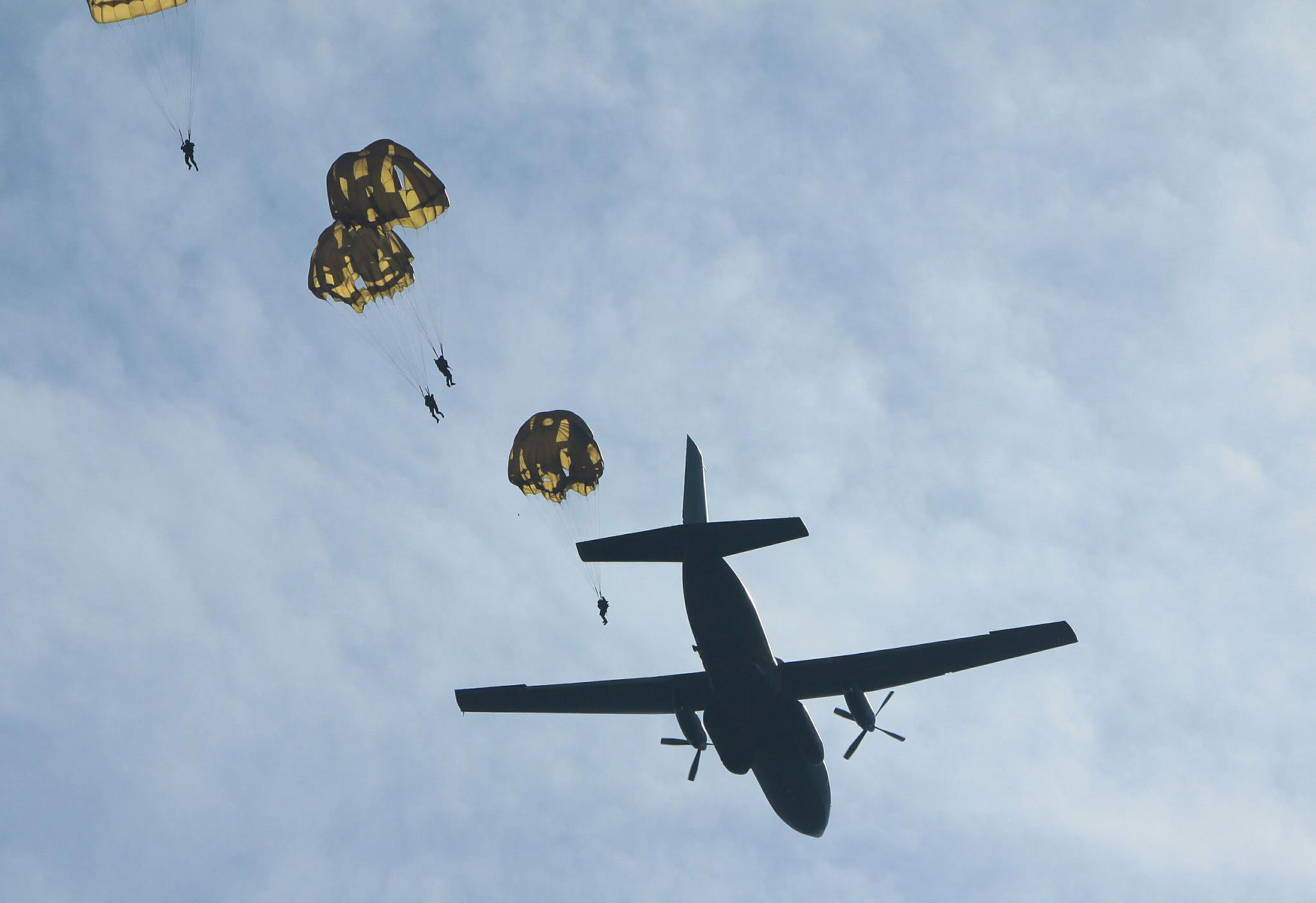
Dutch paratroopers jumping from a C-160

- Army
  - 11th Airmobile Brigade "7th December" (11 Luchtmobiele Brigade "7 December")
    - 11th Headquarters Company (11 Stafstafcompagnie)
    - 11th Infantry Battalion "Garde Grenadiers en Jagers" (11 Infanteriebataljon Garde Grenadiers en Jagers)
    - 12th Infantry Battalion "Regiment van Heutsz" (12 Infanteriebataljon Regiment Van Heutsz)
    - 13th Infantry Battalion "Regiment Stoottroepen Prins Bernhard" (13 Infanteriebataljon Regiment Stoottroepen Prins Bernhard)
    - 11th Brigade Reconnaissance Squadron "Regiment Huzaren van Boreel" (11 Brigadeverkenningseskadron Regiment Huzaren van Boreel)
    - 11th Engineer Company (11 Geniecompagnie)
    - 11th Repairs Company (11 Herstelcompagnie)
    - 11th Supply Company (11 Bevoorradingscompagnie)
    - 11th Medical Company (11 Geneeskundigecompagnie)
  - Commando Troops Corps (Korps Commandotroepen)
  - Defence Parachute School (Defensie Para School)
- Marine Corps
  - 11th (Parachute) Raiding Squadron
  - 23rd (Parachute) Raiding Squadron
  - Maritime Special Operations Forces

== New Zealand ==
- Army
  - 1st New Zealand Special Air Service Regiment
- Air Force
  - Royal New Zealand Air Force Parachute Training and Support Unit

== Nicaragua ==
- Special Operations Command "Major General Pedro Altamirano" (Comando de Operaciones Especiales "General de División Pedro Altamirano")

== Niger ==
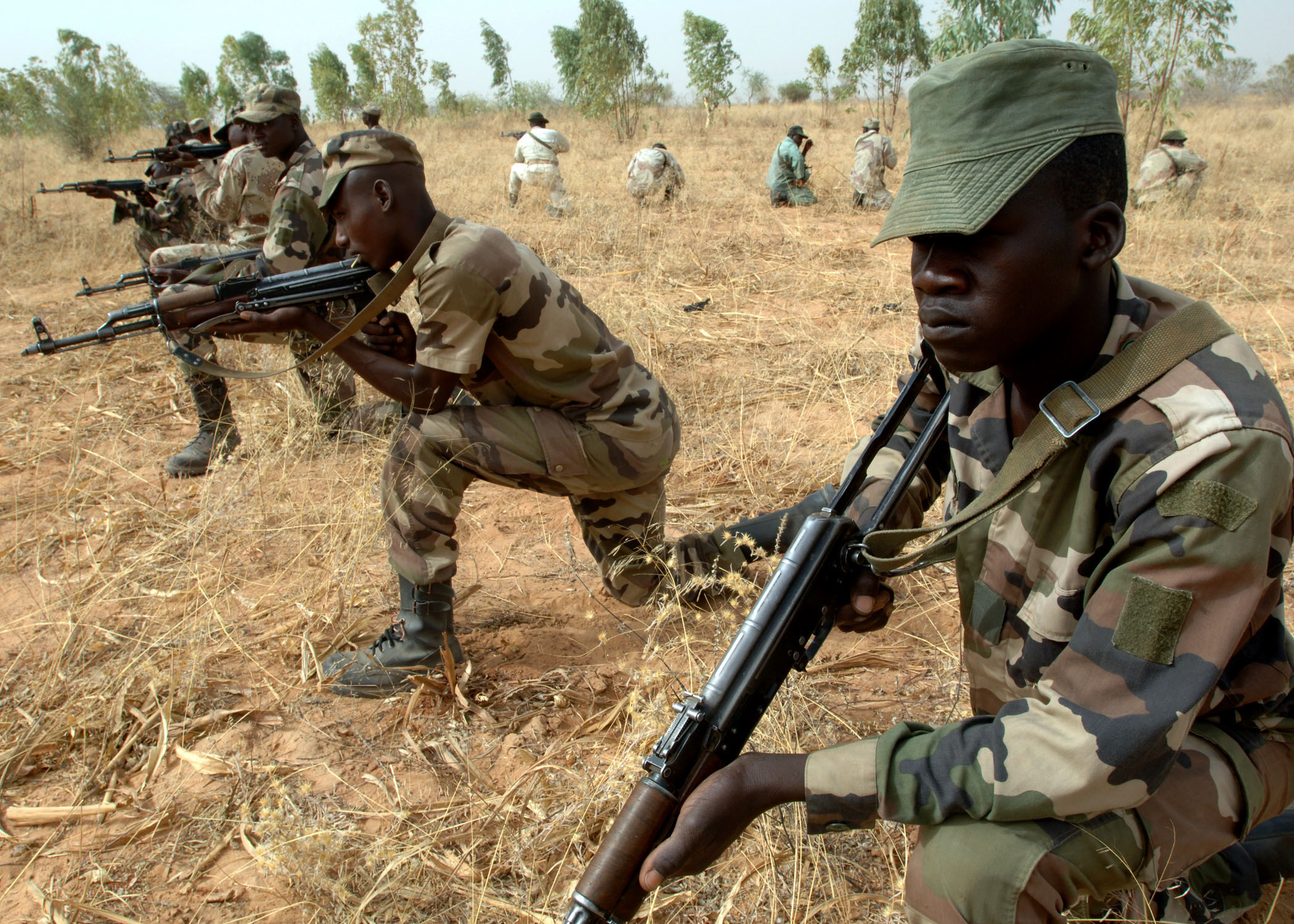
Nigerien paratroopers training in 2007

- 322nd Parachute Regiment (Note: Two parachute companies. See International Institute for Strategic Studies (2021). The Military Balance. Taylor & Francis. p. 481. ISBN 9781032012278.)

== Nigeria ==
- 401st Special Forces Brigade
  - 72nd Special Forces (Paratrooper) Battalion

== Norway ==
- Army
  - Armed Forces Special Command (Forsvarets Spesialkommando)
- Navy
  - Naval Special Operations Command

== Oman ==
- Sultan of Oman's Parachute Regiment (سلطان فوج المظليين العماني - Sultan Fawj Alazaliiyn Aleumanii)
- Sultan's Special Force ( قوات السلطان الخاصة - Qawat al-Sultaniya al-Khasah)

== Pakistan ==
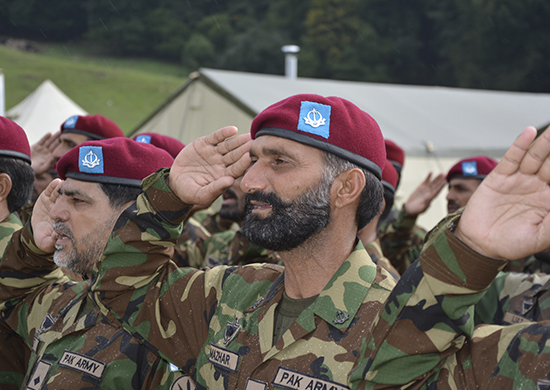
Pakistani paratroopers

- Pakistan Army
  - 50th Airborne Division (Pakistan)
  - Special Service Group:
    - 8th Special Forces Battalions
    - Parachute Training School
- Pakistan Navy
  - Special Service Group (Navy) (airborne forces)
- Pakistan Air Force
  - Special Services Wing

== Paraguay ==
- Air Force
  - Airborne Brigade "Silvio Pettirossi" (Brigada Aerotransportada "Silvio Pettirossi")
    - 1st Parachute Battalion (Batallón de Paracaidistas Nº 1)
    - Parachute Packing and Maintenance and Air Resupply Section (Sección Doblaje y Mantenimiento de Paracaídas y Abastecimiento Aéreo)
    - Paratroopers School (Escuela de Paracaidistas)
- Inter-Services
  - Joint Special Forces Battalion (Batallón Conjunto de Fuerzas Especiales)
    - Special Operations Company (Compañia de Operaciones Especiales)

== Peru ==
- Army
  - 1st Special Forces Brigade "Maj.General Gonzalo Briceño Zevallos" (1ª Brigada de Fuerzas Especiales "Gen.Div. Gonzalo Briceño Zevallos")
    - 39th Special Forces Battalion "Colonel Juan Valer Sandoval" (Batallón de Fuerzas Especiales Nº 39 "Coronel Juan Valer Sandoval")
    - 40th Special Forces Battalion "Callao Guard" (Batallón de Fuerzas Especiales Nº 40 "Guardia Chalaca")
  - 3rd Special Forces Brigade (3ª Brigada de Fuerzas Especiales)
    - 201st Special Forces Battalion "Colonel Guillermo Paz Bustamante" (Batallón de Fuerzas Especiales Nº 201 "Coronel Guillermo Paz Bustamante")
    - 313th Special Forces Battalion "Colonel Pablo Arguedas Hurtado" (Batallón de Fuerzas Especiales Nº 313 "Coronel Pablo Arguedas Hurtado")
  - 6th Special Forces Brigade "Pachacutec" (6ª Brigada de Fuerzas Especiales "Pachacutec")
    - 613th Special Forces Battalion "Captain Ilich Montesinos Quiroz" (Batallón de Fuerzas Especiales Nº 613 "Capitán Ilich Montesinos Quiroz")
    - 623rd Special Forces Battalion "Lieutenant Gerardo Iturraran García" (Batallón de Fuerzas Especiales Nº 623 "Teniente Gerardo Iturraran García")
  - Army Paratrooper School (Escuela de Paracaidistas del Ejercito)
- Navy
  - Special Operations Force (Fuerza de Operaciones Especiales)
- Marine Corps
  - Commando Battalion "1st Lt. Leoncio Prado Gutierrez" (Batallón de Comandos "Teniente Primero Leoncio Prado Gutierrez")
- Air Force
  - Air Force Commandos (Comandos de la Fuerza Aérea del Perú)
  - Paratrooper Company (Compañía de Paracaidistas)

== Philippines ==
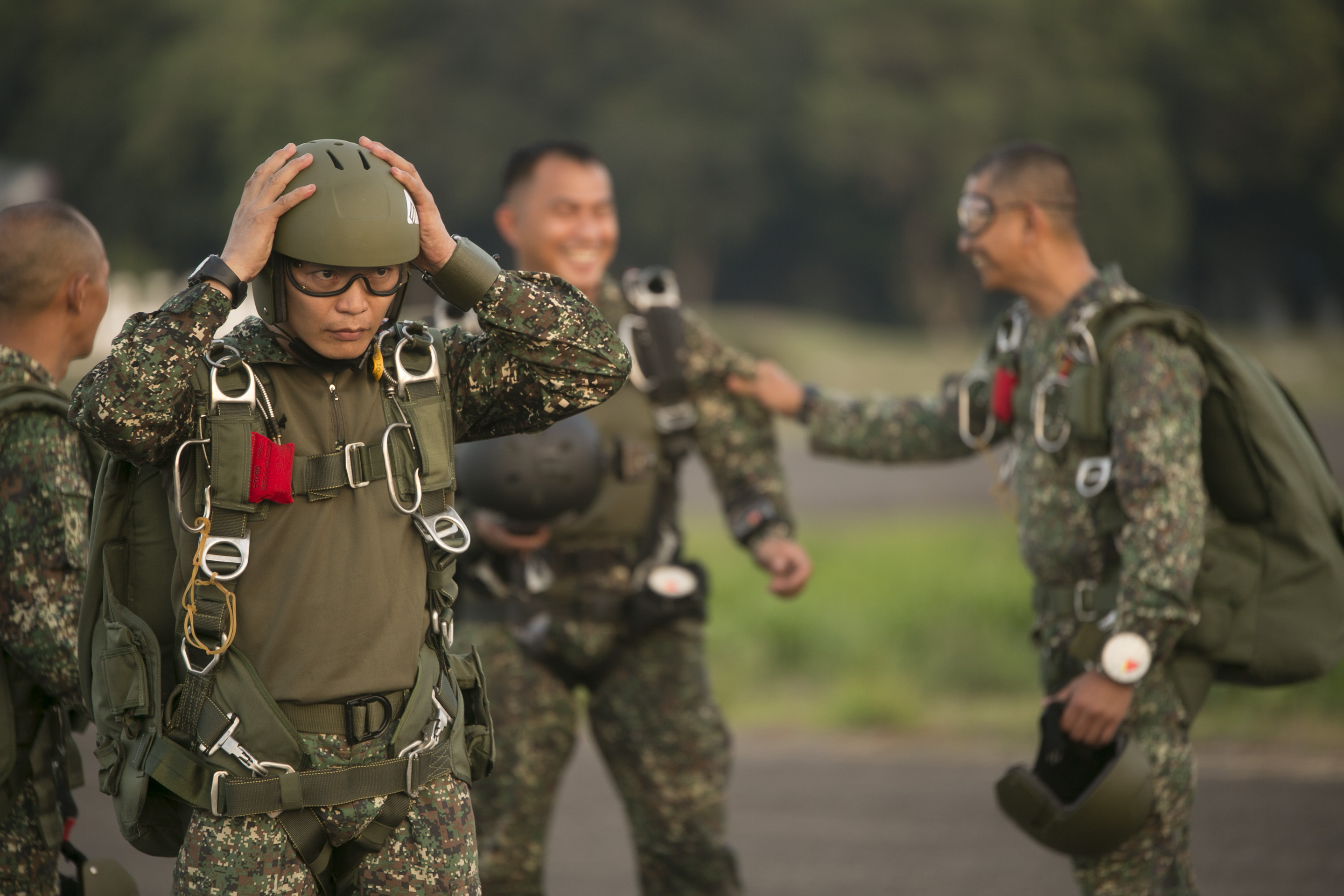
Philippine Marine Special Operations Group paratroopers

- Army
  - Special Forces Regiment (Airborne)
    - 1st Special Forces Battalion "Anytime Anywhwere"
    - 2nd Special Forces Battalion "Sabretooth"
    - 3rd Special Forces Battalion "Arrowhead"
    - 4th Special Forces Battalion (Riverine) "Dolphin Warriors"
    - 5th Special Forces Battalion "Primus Inter Pares"
    - 6th Special Forces Battalion "Lionheart"
    - Special Forces Airborne School
- Navy
  - Naval Special Operations Command
- Marine Corps
  - Force Reconnaissance Group
- Air Force
  - 710th Special Operations Wing

== Poland ==
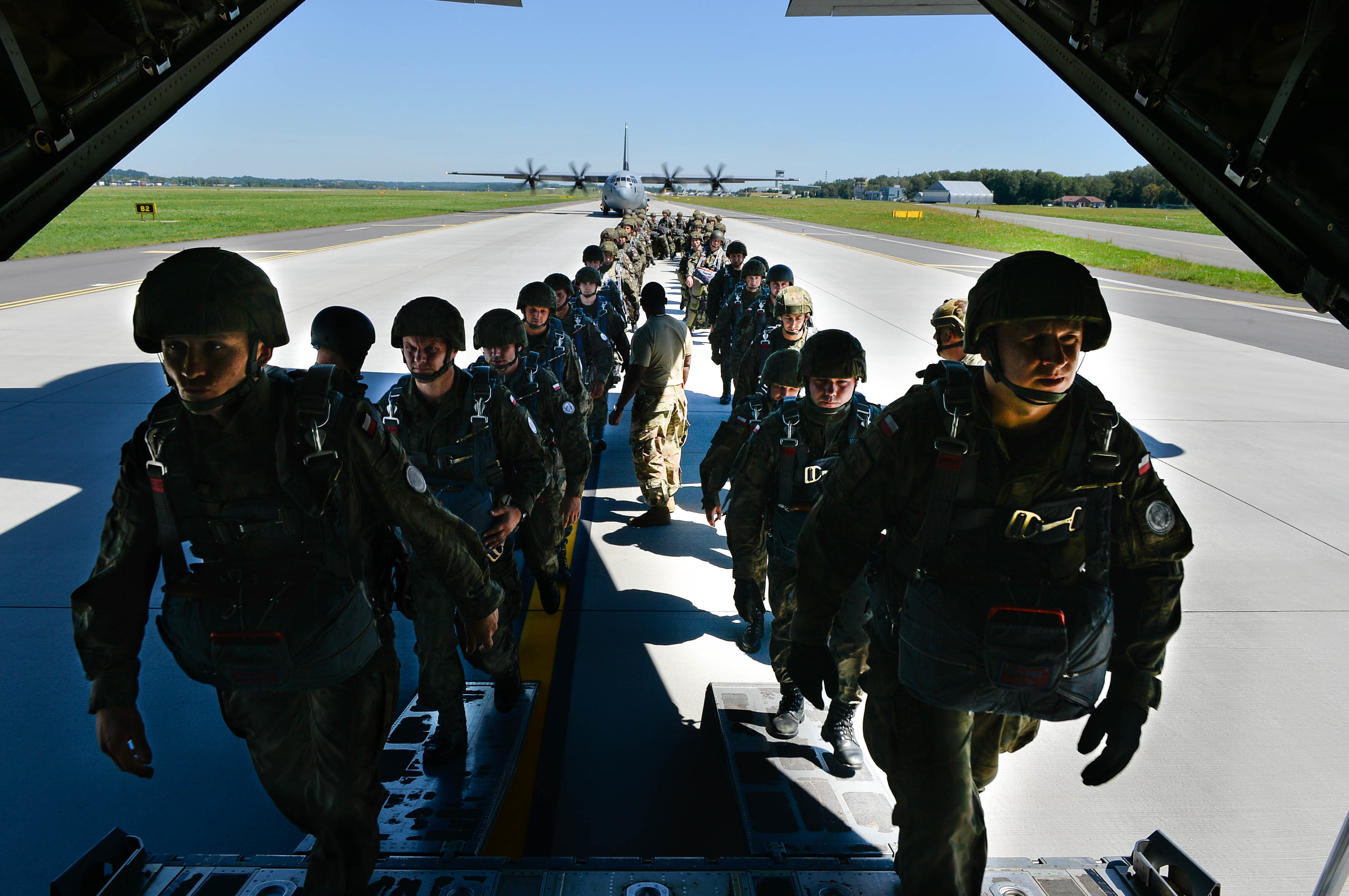
Polish paratroopers boarding an USAF plane

- Army
  - 6th Airborne Brigade "Brigadier General Stanisław Franciszek Sosabowski" (6 Brygada Powietrznodesantowa im. gen. bryg. Stanisława Franciszka Sosabowskiego)
    - 6th Headquarters Battalion "Lieutenant General Józef Kuropieski" (6 Batalion Dowodzenia im. gen. broni. Józefa Kuropieski)
    - 6th Airborne Battalion "Major General Edwin Rozłubirski" (6 Batalion Powietrznodesantowy im. gen. dyw. Edwina Rozłubirskiego)
    - 16th Airborne Battalion "Brigadier General Marian Zdrzałki" (16 Batalion Powietrznodesantowy im. gen. bryg. Mariana Zdrzałki)
    - 18th Airborne Battalion "Captain Ignacy Gazurek" (18 Batalion Powietrznodesantowy im. kpt. Ignacego Gazurka)
    - 6th Logistics Battalion "Major General Ignacy Prądzyński" (6 Batalion Logistyczny im. gen. dyw. Ignacego Prądzyńskiego)
    - 6th Medical Security Group (6 Grupa Zabezpieczenia Medycznego)
  - Aeromobile-Parachute Training Center (Ośrodek Szkolenia Aeromobilno-Spadochronowego)
- Special Forces Component Command (Dowództwo Komponentu Wojsk Specjalnych)
  - Army
    - Operational Maneuver Response Group Military Unit "Silent Unseen of the Home Army" (Jednostka Wojskowa Grupa Reagowania Operacyjno-Manewrowego im. Cichociemnych Spadochroniarzy Armii Krajowe)
    - Commandos Military Unit (Jednostka Wojskowa Komandosów)
    - AGAT Military Unit (Jednostka Wojskowa AGAT)
  - Navy
    - Formoza Military Unit (Jednostka Wojskowa Formoza)

== Portugal ==
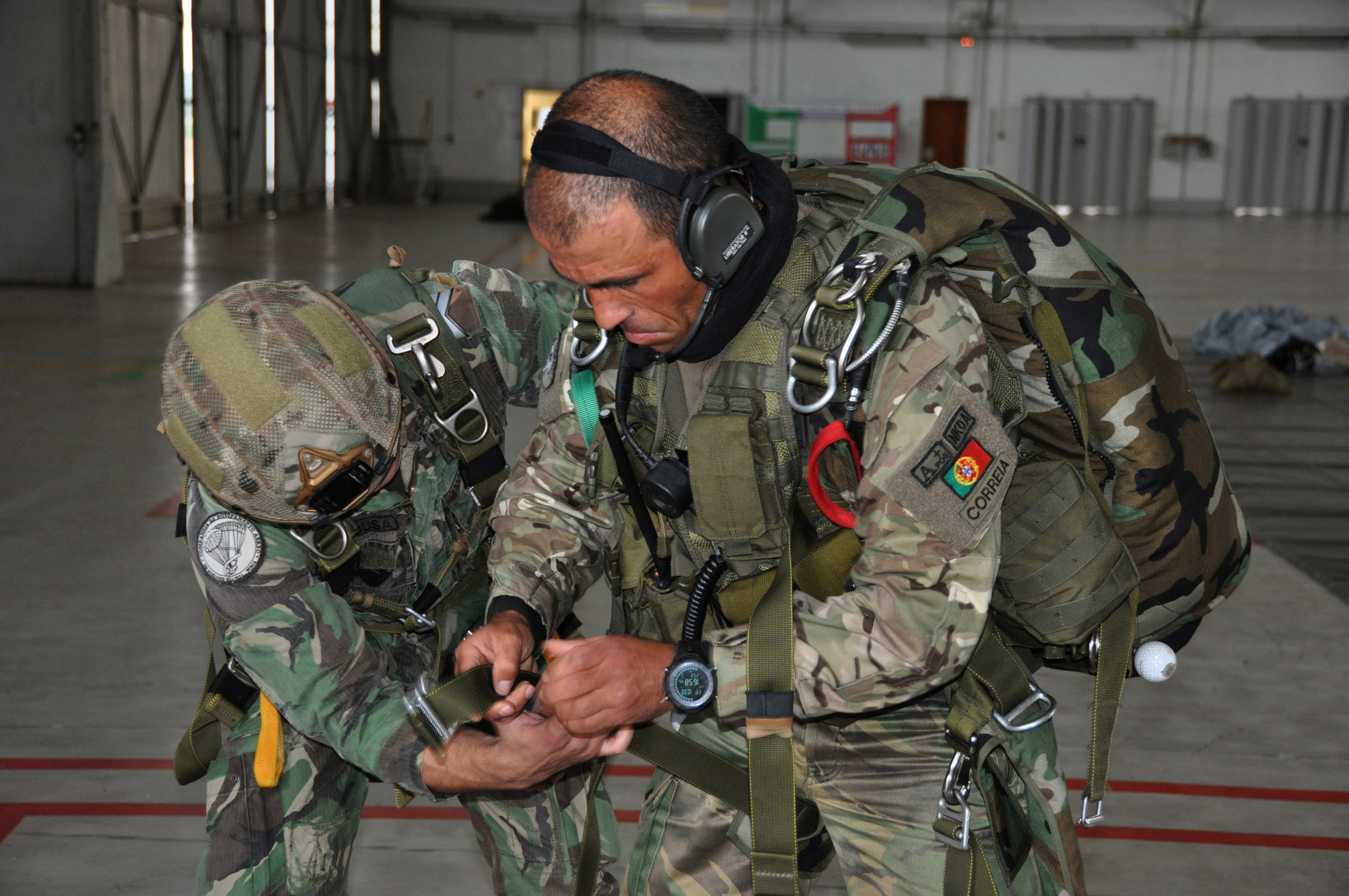
Pathfinder of the Companhia de Percursores Aeroterrestres

- Army
  - Rapid Reaction Brigade (Brigada de Reacção Rápida)
    - 15th Infantry Regiment (Regimento de Infantaria nº 15)
      - 1st Parachute Infantry Battalion (1.º Batalhão de Infantaria Paraquedista)
    - 10th Infantry Regiment (Portugal) (Regimento de Infantaria nº 10)
      - 2nd Parachute Infantry Battalion (2.º Batalhão de Infantaria Paraquedista)
    - Paratroopers Regiment (Regimento de Paraquedistas)
      - Air-Land Operational Battalion (Batalhão Operacional Aeroterrestre)
      - Training Battalion (Batalhão de Formação)
      - Air-Land Pathfinders Company (Companhia de Percursores Aeroterrestres)
      - Air Supply Company (Companhia de Abastecimento Aéreo)
      - Technical Dogs Platoon (Pelotão Cinotécnico)
    - 4th Artillery Regiment (Regimento de Artilharia Nº 4)
    - Reconnaissance Squadron, 3rd Cavalry Regiment (Portugal) (Esquadrão de Reconhecimento - Regimento de Cavalaria N.º 3)
    - Special Operations Troops Centre (Centro de Tropas de Operações Especiais)
      - Special Operations Force (Força de Operações Especiais)
- Navy
  - Special Actions Detachment (Destacamento de Ações Especiais)

== Qatar ==
- Joint Special Forces Command (Note: One Special Forces company. See International Institute for Strategic Studies (2021). The Military Balance. Taylor & Francis. p. 361. ISBN 9781032012278.)

== Romania ==
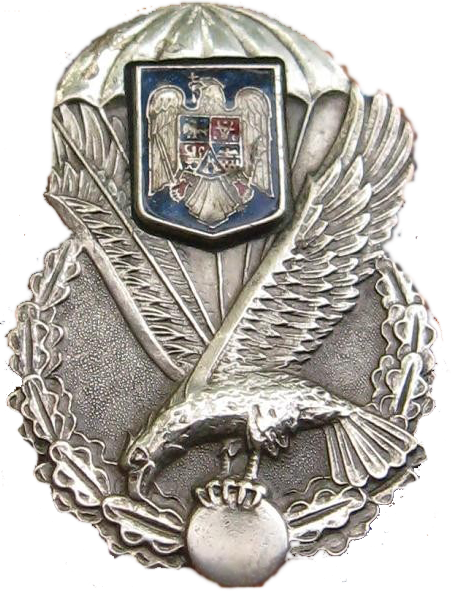
Romanian paratrooper brevet

- Romanian Special Operations Forces Command (Comandamentul Forțelor pentru Operații Speciale")
  - 51st Special Operations Battalion "Vulturii" (Batalionul 51 Operații Speciale "Vulturii")
  - 52nd Special Operations Battalion "Băneasa-Otopeni" (Batalionul 52 Operații Speciale "Băneasa-Otopeni")
  - 53rd Commando Battalion "Smaranda Brăescu" (Batalionul 630 Comando "Smaranda Brăescu")
- 313th Search Battalion "Burebista" (Batalionul 313 Cercetare "Burebista")
- 495th Parachute Battalion "Captain Ștefan Sovereth" (Batalionul 495 Parașutiști "Căpitan Ștefan Soverth")
- Training Center for ISR, Paratroopers, Special operations and JTAC "Major General Grigore Baştan" (Centrul de Instruire pentru ISR, Parașutiști, Operații Speciale și JTAC "General-maior Grigore Baștan")

== Russian Federation ==
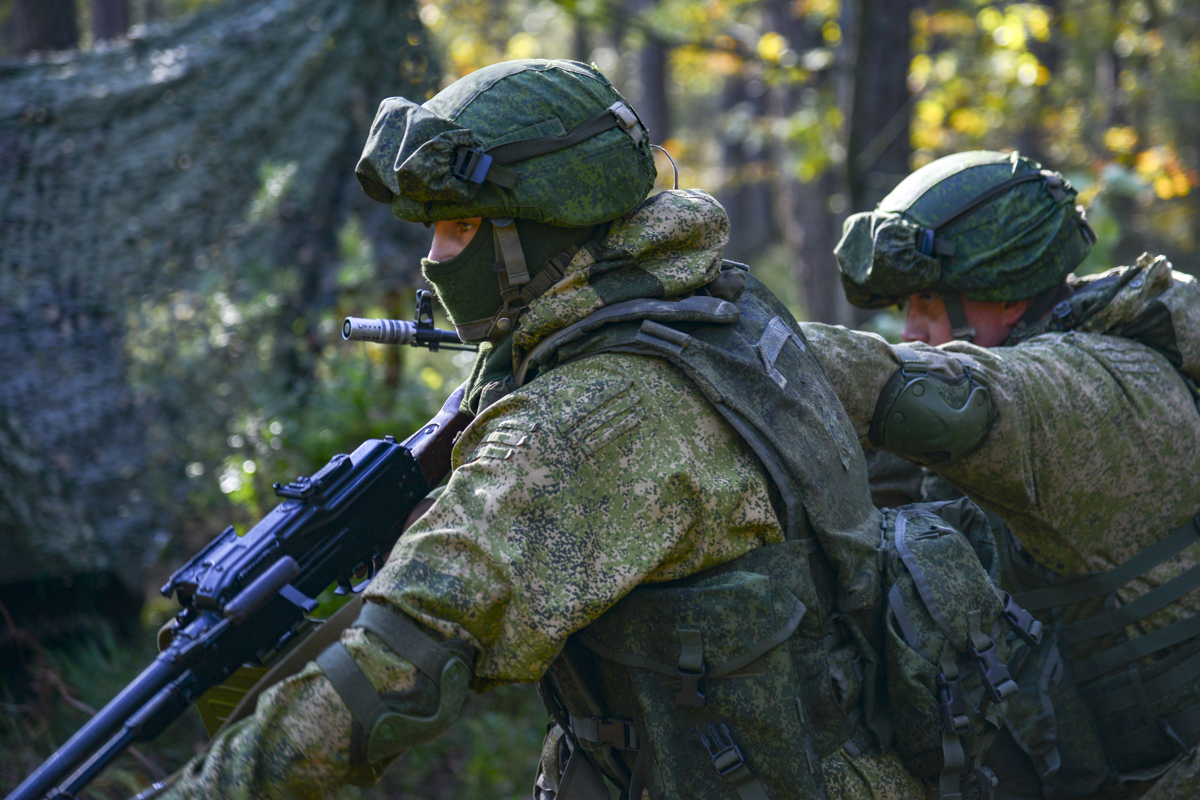
Russian paratroopers in training, 2018

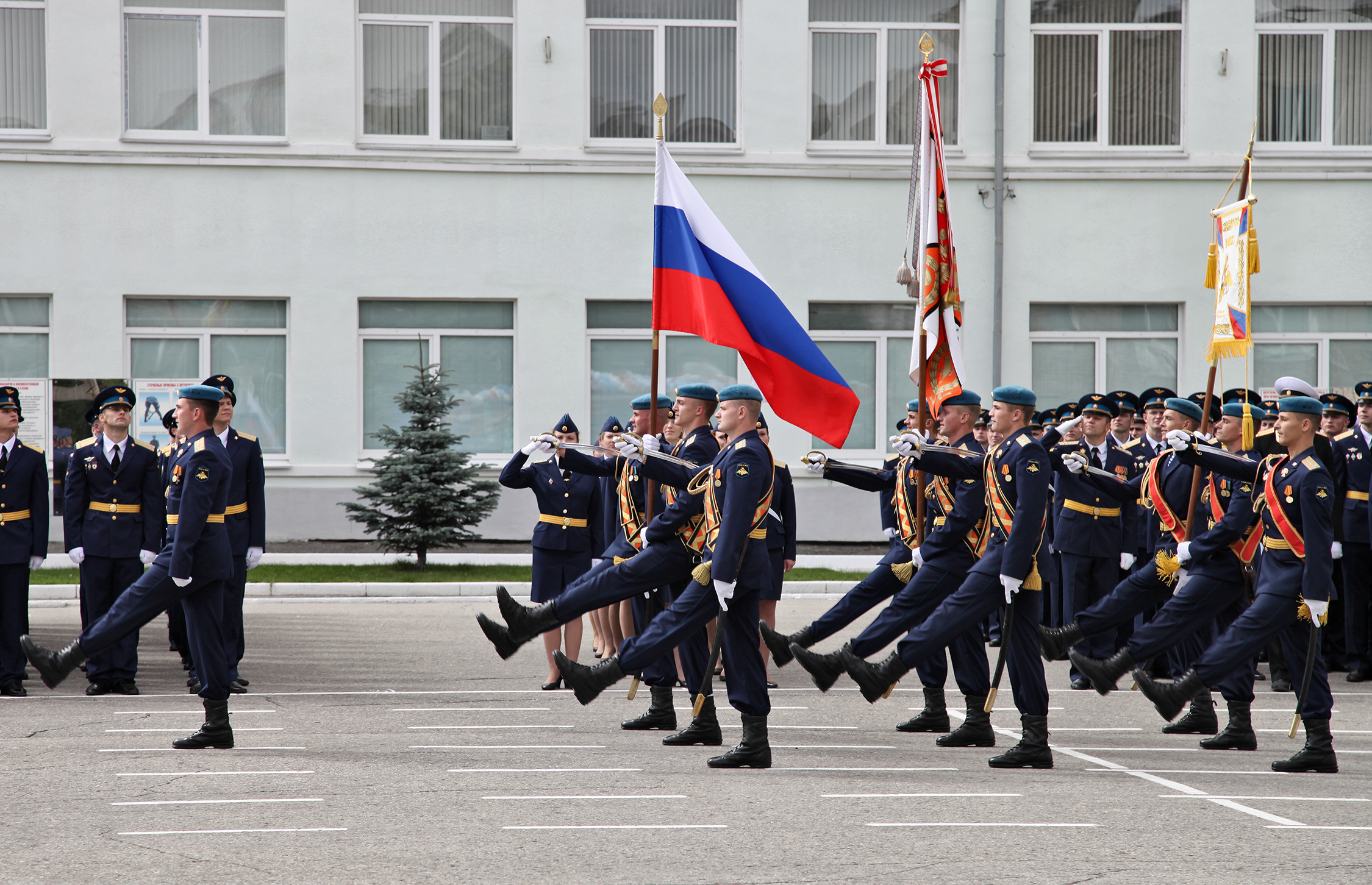
Parade at the Ryazan Higher Airborne Command School "General V.F. Margelov", 2013

- Army
  - Russian Airborne Forces
    - 7th Guards Mountain Air Assault Division
      - 108th Guards Kuban Cossack Air Assault Regiment
      - 247th Guards Air Assault Regiment
      - 1141st Guards Artillery Regiment
      - 3rd Anti-Aircraft Missile Regiment
      - 162nd Reconnaissance Battalion
      - 629th Engineer-Sapper Battalion
      - 743rd Guards Signal Battalion
      - 1681st Materials Supply Battalion
      - 32nd Medical Unit (Airmobile)
      - 967th Airborne Security Company
      - Radiolectronic Warfare Company
      - Unmanned Flying Company
    - 76th Guards Air Assault Division
      - 104th Guards Air Assault Regiment
      - 234th Guards Air Assault Regiment "Holy Blessed Alexander Nevsky"
      - 237th Guards Assault Landing Regiment "Toruń"
      - 1140th Guards Artillery Regiment
      - 4th Anti-Aircraft Missile Regiment
      - 175th Guards Reconnaissance Battalion
      - 656th Guards Engineer-Sapper Battalion
      - 728th Guards Signal Battalion
      - 1682nd Materials Supply Battalion
      - 35th Medical Unit (Airmobile)
      - 968th Airborne Security Company
      - Radiolectronic Warfare Company
      - Unmanned Flying Company
    - 98th Guards Svir Air Assault Division "70th Anniversary of the Great October Revolution"
      - 217th Guards Parachute Regiment
      - 331st Guards Parachute Regiment
      - 1065th Guards Artillery Regiment
      - 5th Anti-Aircraft Missile Regiment
      - 215th Guards Reconnaissance Battalion
      - 661st Guards Engineer-Sapper Battalion
      - 674th Guards Signal Battalion
      - 1683rd Materials Supply Battalion
      - 36th Medical Unit (Airmobile)
      - 969th Airborne Security Company
      - Radiolectronic Warfare Company
      - Unmanned Flying Company
    - 106th Guards Airborne Division "Tula"
      - 51st Guards Parachute Regiment "Dmitry Donskoy"
      - 137th Guards Parachute Regiment
      - 1182nd Guards Artillery Regiment
      - 1st Anti-Aircraft Missile Regiment
      - 173rd Guards Reconnaissance Battalion
      - 388th Guards Engineer-Sapper Battalion
      - 731st Guards Signal Battalion
      - 1060th Materials Supply Battalion
      - 39th Medical Unit (Airmobile)
      - 970th Airborne Security Company
      - Radiolectronic Warfare Company
      - Unmanned Flying Company
    - 45th Guards Special Purpose Brigade
      - 218th Special Purpose Battalion
      - 901st Special Purpose Battalion
    - 11th Guards Air Assault Brigade
      - 1st Air Assault Battalion
      - 2nd Air Assault Battalion
      - 3rd Air Assault Battalion
    - 31st Guards Air Assault Brigade
      - 1st Air Assault Battalion
      - 2nd Air Assault Battalion
      - 3rd Parachute Battalion
    - 56th Guards Air Assault Brigade
      - 1st Air Assault Battalion
      - 2nd Air Assault Battalion
      - 3rd Parachute Battalion
    - 83rd Guards Air Assault Brigade
      - 1st Air Assault Battalion
      - 2nd Air Assault Battalion
      - 3rd Air Assault Battalion
    - 38th Guards Command Brigade
    - 150th Repairs and Recovery Battalion
    - Ryazan Higher Airborne Command School "General V.F. Margelov"
    - 242nd Junior Specialist Training Center
    - 226th Parachute Training Regiment
    - 285th Parachute Training Regiment
  - Special Purposes Forces
    - 2nd Special Purposes Brigade
      - 70th Special Purposes Detachment
      - 177th Special Purposes Detachment
      - 329th Special Purposes Detachment
      - 700th Special Purposes Detachment
    - 3rd Guards Special Purposes Brigade "Warsaw-Berlin"
      - 330th Special Purposes Detachment
      - 501st Special Purposes Detachment
      - 503rd Special Purposes Detachment
      - 509th Special Purposes Detachment
      - 510th Special Purposes Detachment
      - 512th Special Purposes Detachment
    - 10th Special Purposes Brigade
      - 85th Special Purposes Detachment
      - 95th Special Purposes Detachment
      - 104th Special Purposes Detachment
      - 551st Special Purposes Detachment
    - 14th Guards Special Purposes Brigade
      - 282nd Special Purposes Detachment
      - 294th Special Purposes Detachment
      - 308th Special Purposes Detachment
      - 546th Special Purposes Detachment
      - 742nd Special Purposes Detachment
    - 16th Guards Special Purposes Brigade
      - 370th Special Purposes Detachment
      - 379th Special Purposes Detachment
      - 585th Special Purposes Detachment
      - 664th Special Purposes Detachment
      - 669th Special Purposes Detachment
    - 22nd Guards Special Purposes Brigade
      - 108th Special Purposes Detachment
      - 173rd Special Purposes Detachment
      - 305th Special Purposes Detachment
      - 411th Special Purposes Detachment
    - 24th Guards Special Purposes Brigade "Brandenburg"
      - 261st Special Purposes Detachment
      - 281st Special Purposes Detachment
      - 297th Special Purposes Detachment
      - 641st Special Purposes Detachment
    - 67th Special Purposes Brigade
      - 690th Special Purposes Detachment
      - 691st Special Purposes Detachment
    - 1327th Application Center for Reconnaissance Units and Special Purpose Units
- Navy
  - Marine Corps
    - 61st Marine Infantry Brigade "Kirkenes"
      - 876th Air Assault Battalion
    - 155th Marine Infantry Brigade "Kazakhs "
      - 47th Air Assault Battalion
    - 336th Guards Marine Infantry Brigade "Belostok"
      - 879th Air Assault Battalion
    - 810th Guards Marine Infantry Brigade "60th Anniversary of the Formation of the USSR"
      - 542nd Air Assault Battalion
    - 3rd "Krasnodar-Harbin" Marine Infantry Regiment
      - Air Assault Battalion
  - Marine Reconnaissance Points for Special Purpose (Морские разведывательные пункты специального назначения )
    - 42nd Marine Reconnaissance Point
    - 160th Marine Reconnaissance Point
    - 420th Marine Reconnaissance Point
    - 431st Marine Reconnaissance Point
    - 457th Marine Reconnaissance Point
    - 461st Marine Reconnaissance Point
- National Guard
  - Main Directorate of the Special Purpose Forces of the Federal Service of the National Guard Troops of the Russian Federation
    - 604th Special Purpose Center - Military Unit 3179
- Inter-services (Ministry of Defence)
  - Special Operations Forces
    - Specialist Training Center "Senezh" - Military Unit 43292 (Note: Also known as "Sunflowers" (Подсолнухи - Podsolnukhi))
    - Special Purpose Center "Kubinka-2" - Military Unit 01355 (Note: Also known as "Over-the-fence", i.e Backwater, Outback, Nowhereland etc (Зазаборье - Zazabor'ye) or "Cuba" (Куба - Kuba))
    - 561st Emergency Rescue Center - Military Unit 00317

== Rwanda ==
- one Para Commando battalion

== Saudi Arabia ==
- Paratroopers and Special Security Forces (وحدات المظليين وقوات الأمن الخاصة - Wahadat Almazaliiyn Waquwwat Al'amn Alkhasa)
  - 1st Parachute Brigade
    - 4th Parachute Infantry Battalion
    - 5th Parachute Infantry Battalion
  - 64th Special Forces Brigade (لواء القوات الخاصة الرابع والستون - Liwa' al-Quwwat al-Khasat alrrabie Walsutuwn)
    - 85th Special Forces Battalion (الكتيبةالقوات الخاصة الخامسة والثمانون - Al-Ktybtalqwat al-Khasat al-Khamisat Walthamanun)
  - Parachute Center and School (مركز ومدرسة المظليين - Markaz Wamadarisat al-Muzliiyn)

== Senegal ==
- Parachute Battalion (Bataillon Parachutiste)

== Serbia ==
- 63rd Parachute Brigade (63. Падобранска Бригада - 63. Padobranska Brigada), including:
  - Parachute Training Company (Падобранска Чета за Обуку - Padobranska Četa za Obuku)
  - Parachute Combat Search and Rescue Company (Падобранска Чета Борбеног Трагања и Спасавањ - Padobranska Četa Borbenog Traganja i Spasavanj)

== Seychelles ==
- Special Forces Unit "Barracuda" (Unité des Forces Spéciales "Tazar")

== Singapore ==
- Singapore Armed Forces Commando Formation
  - 1st Commando Battalion
- Parachute Training Wing

== Slovakia ==
- 5th Special Purpose Regiment "Jozef Gabčík" (5. Pluk Špeciálneho Určenia "Jozefa Gabčíka")

== Slovenia ==
- Special Operations Unit (Enota za Specialno Delovanje)
- PEST(Posebna enota specialne taktike) military police special forces

== South Africa ==
- Army
  - 44 Parachute Regiment
    - 1 Parachute Battalion - Parachute Training Centre
    - Bagaka Regiment (Reserve)
    - 3 Parachute Battalion (Reserve)
    - 44 Pathfinder Platoon
    - 13 Signal Squadron
    - 101 Air Supply Unit - South African Ordnance Services Corps
  - Steve Biko Artillery Regiment (Reserve)
- South African Special Forces Brigade
  - 4 Special Forces Regiment
  - 5 Special Forces Regiment
- Military Health Service
  - 7 Medical Battalion Group
    - 44 Medical Task Group (detached to 44 Parachute Regiment)

== South Ossetia ==
- Special Purpose Battalion "Zelim Muldarov" (Батальона Специального Назначения имени Зелима Мулдарова - Batal'ona Spetsial'nogo Naznacheniya imeni Zelima Muldarova)

== Spain ==
Flag of the Spanish 6th Airborne Brigade

- Army
  - 6th Parachute Brigade "Almogavars" (Brigada "Almogávares" VI de Paracaidistas)
    - Headquarters Battalion (Batallón del Cuartel General),
      - Headquarters Company (Compañía de Cuartel General)
      - Forward Reconnaissance Company (Compañía de Reconocimiento Avanzado)
      - Intelligence Company (Compañía de Inteligencia)
      - Nuclear, Bacteriological and Chemical Defense Company (Compañía de Defensa Nuclear, Bacteriológica y Química)
    - 4th Parachute Infantry Regiment "Naples" (Regimiento de Infantería "Nápoles" n.º 4 de Paracaidistas)
      - I/4th Battalion "Roger de Flor" (Bandera "Roger de Flor" I/4)
      - II/4th Battalion "Roger of Lauria" (Bandera "Roger de Lauria" II/4)
    - 5th Parachute Infantry Regiment "Zaragoza" (Regimiento de Infantería "Zaragoza" n.º 5 de Paracaidistas)
      - III/5th Battalion "Ortiz de Zárate" (Bandera "Ortiz de Zárate" III/5)
    - 8th Cavalry Regiment "Lusitania" (Regimiento de Caballería "Lusitania" n.º 8)
      - I/8th Light Armored Cavalry Group "Sagunto" (Grupo Ligero Acorazado I/8 "Sagunto")
    - 6th Parachute Field Artillery Group (Grupo de Artillería de Campaña Paracaidista VI)
    - 6th Parachute Engineers Battalion (Batallón de Zapadores Paracaidistas VI)
    - 6th Logistic Group (Grupo Logístico VI)
    - 6th Parachute Signals Company (Compañía de Transmisiones Paracaidista)
    - Parachute Training Battalion ( Batallón de Instrucción Paracaidista )
    - Cargo Airdrop and Packing Group (Grupo de Lanzamiento y Preparacion de Cargas)
  - Special Operations Command "Military Knightly Orders" (Mando de Operaciones Especiales "Órdenes Militares")
    - 2nd Special Operations Group "Granada" (Grupo de Operaciones Especiales "Granada" II)
    - 3rd Special Operations Group "Valencia" (Grupo de Operaciones Especiales "Valencia" III)
    - 4th Special Operations Group "Tercio of Ampurdán" (Grupo de Operaciones Especiales "Tercio del Ampurdán" IV)
    - 19th Special Operations Battalion of the Spanish Legion "Legionnaire Knight Maderal Oleaga" (Bandera de Operaciones Especiales de la Legión "Caballero Legionario Maderal Oleaga" XIX)
- Navy
  - Special Naval War Force (Fuerza de Guerra Naval Especial), including:
    - Submarine Parachute Assistance Group (Grupo Paracaidista de Apoyo al Submarino)
  - Marine Infantry Force (Fuerza de Infantería de Marina)
    - Target Recognition and Acquisition Company (Compañía de Reconocimiento y Adquisición de Blancos)
- Air Force
  - "Further Beyond" Flight of His Majesty the King's Royal Guard Regiment (Escuadrilla "Plus Ultra" del Regimiento de la Guardia Real de Su Majestad el Rey)
  - Parachute Engineers Squadron (Escuadrón de Zapadores Paracaidistas)
  - Air Deployment Support Squadron (Escuadrón de Apoyo al Despliegue Aéreo)
  - Military Parchutist School "Méndez Parada" (Escuela Militar de Paracaidismo "Méndez Parada")

== Sri Lanka ==
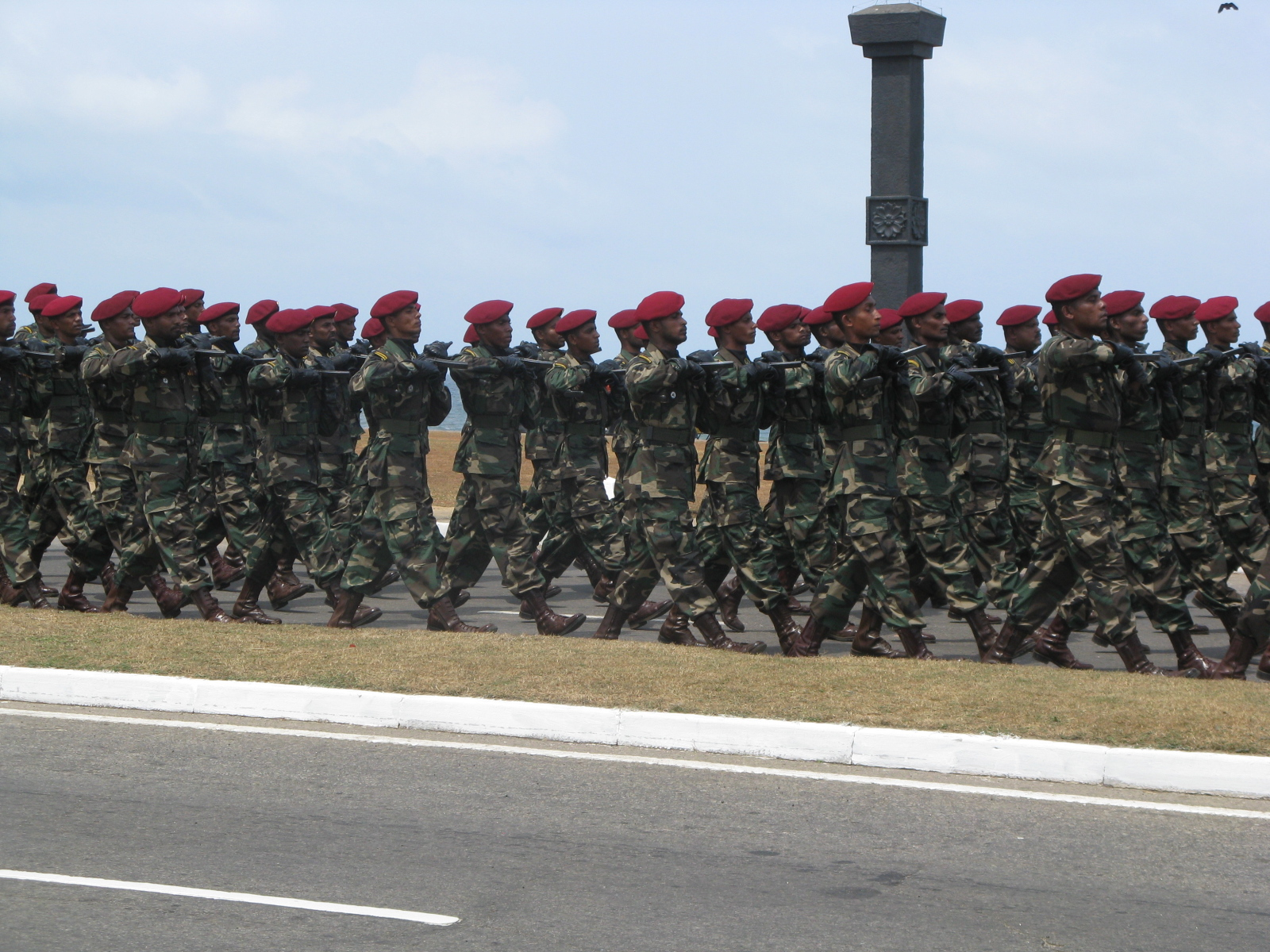
Sri Lankan Commandos on parade, 2012

- Army
  - Special Forces
    - 12th Special Forces Regiment (12 විශේෂ බලකා රෙජිමේන්තුව - 12 Viśēṣa Balakā Rejimēntuva)
    - 13th Special Forces Regiment (13 විශේෂ බලකා රෙජිමේන්තුව - 13 Viśēṣa Balakā Rejimēntuva)
  - Commando Regiment
    - 1st Commando Regiment (1 කමාන්ඩෝ රෙජිමේන්තුව - 1 Kamānḍō Rejimēntuva)
    - 2nd Commando Regiment (2 කමාන්ඩෝ රෙජිමේන්තුව - 2 Kamānḍō Rejimēntuva)
    - 3rd Commando Regiment (3 කමාන්ඩෝ රෙජිමේන්තුව - 3 Kamānḍō Rejimēntuva)
    - 4th Commando Regiment (4 කමාන්ඩෝ රෙජිමේන්තුව - 4 Kamānḍō Rejimēntuva)
    - Commando Training School Parachute Wing
- Navy
  - Special Boat Squadron (විශේෂ යාත්රා බලඝණය - Viśēṣa Yātrā Balaghaṇaya)
- Air Force
  - Special Airborne Force
  - Parachute Training School ( පැරෂුට් පුහුණු පාසල - Pæraṣuṭ Puhuṇu Pāsala)

== Sudan ==
- 9th Airborne Division
  - two Airborne Brigades
  - 144th Special Forces Battalion

== Suriname ==
- Special Troops Corps (Korps Speciale Troepen)

== Sweden ==
- 323rd Parachute Ranger Squadron (323. Fallskärmsjägarskvadronen)
- Special Operations Group (Särskilda Operationsgruppen)

== Switzerland ==
- Special Forces Command (Kommando Spezialkräfte - Commandement des Forces Spéciales - Comando Forze Speciali)
  - Army Reconnaissance Detachment 10 (Armee-Aufklärungsdetachement 10 - Détachement de Reconnaissance de l'Armée 10 - Distaccamento d'Esplorazione dell'Esercito 10)
  - Parachute Reconnaissance Company 17 (Fallschirmaufklärer Kompanie 17 - Compagnie d'Eclaireurs Parachutistes 17 - Compagnia di Esploratori Paracadutisti 17)
  - Special Forces Training Center (Ausbildungszentrum Spezialkräfte - Centre d'Instruction des Forces Spéciales - Centro di Istruzione Forze Speciali)

== Tajikistan ==
- 7th Air Assault Brigade (Бригадаи 7-уми ҳамла ба десанти ҳавоӣ - Brigadai 7-umi Hamla ʙa Desanti Havoī)

== Tanzania ==
- one Special Forces unit

== Thailand ==
- Army
  - 31st Infantry Regiment, King Bhumibol's Guard (กรมทหารราบที่ 31 รักษาพระองค์ - Krm Thh̄ār Rāb Thī̀ 31 Rạks̄ʹā Phraxngkh̒)
    - 1st Infantry Battalion (กองพันทหารราบที่ 1 - Kxngphạn thh̄ār rāb thī̀ 1)
    - 2nd Infantry Battalion (กองพันทหารราบที่ 2 - Kxngphạn thh̄ār rāb thī̀ 2)
    - 3rd Infantry Battalion (กองพันทหารราบที่ 3 - Kxngphạn thh̄ār rāb thī̀ 3)
  - Long Range Reconnaissance Patrol Company (กองร้อยลาดตระเวนระยะไกล)
  - Royal Thai Army Special Warfare Command (หน่วยบัญชาการสงครามพิเศษ)
    - 1st Special Warfare Division (กองพลรบพิเศษที่ 1 - Kxngphl Rb Phiṣ̄es̄ʹ Thī̀ 1)
      - 1st Special Warfare Regiment (กรมรบพิเศษที่ 1 - Krm Rb Phiṣ̄es̄ʹ Thī̀ 1)
      - 2nd Special Warfare Regiment (กรมรบพิเศษที่ 2 - Krm Rb Phiṣ̄es̄ʹ Thī̀ 2)
      - 3rd Special Forces Regiment, King's Guard (กรมรบพิเศษที่ 3 รักษาพระองค์ - Krm Rb Phiṣ̄es̄ʹ Thī̀ 3 Rạks̄ʹā Phraxngkh̒)
      - 4th Special Warfare Regiment (กรมรบพิเศษที่ 4 - Krm Rb Phiṣ̄es̄ʹ Thī̀ 4)
      - 5th Special Warfare Regiment (กรมรบพิเศษที่ 5 - Krm Rb Phiṣ̄es̄ʹ Thī̀ 5)
- Navy
  - Royal Thai Navy SEALs (หน่วยบัญชาการสงครามพิเศษทางเรือ กองเรือยุทธการ)
  - RTMC Reconnaissance Battalion (กองพันลาดตระเวน กองพลนาวิกโยธิน)
- Air Force
  - Special Operations Regiment (กรมปฏิบัติการพิเศษ - Krm Pt̩ibạtikār Phiṣ̄es̄ )

== Togo ==
- Parachute Commando Regiment (Régiment Parachutiste Commando) (Note: Three Parachute Commandos companies. See International Institute for Strategic Studies (2021). The Military Balance. Taylor & Francis. p. 481. ISBN 9781032012278.)

== Tunisia ==
- Army Special Forces Group (لواء القوات الخاصة للجيش - lwa' Alquwwat Alkhasat Liljaysh)

== Turkey ==
- Army
  - 1st Commando Brigade (1. Komando Tugayı)
    - four Commando Battalions (Komando Taburu)
    - one Airborne Battalion (Hava İndirme Taburu)
    - Artillery Battalion (Topçu Taburu)
    - Logistic Support Battalion (Lojistik Destek Taburu)
    - Airborne and Commando Training Battalion (Hava İndirme ve Komando Eğitim Taburu)
    - Guard Company (Muhafız Bölüğü)
    - Anti-tank Unit (Tanksavar Birliği)
    - Communication Electronic Systems Company (Muhabere Elektronik Sistemler Bölüğü)
    - Engineering Company (İstihkam Bölüğü)
    - Service Unit (Hizmet Birliği)
  - Special Forces Command (Özel Kuvvetler Komutanlığı)
- Air Force
  - Air Force Search and Rescue
  - Combat Search and Rescue (Turkish Armed Forces)
- Navy
  - Underwater Offence Group (Su Altı Taarruz Grup)
  - Parachute Search and Rescue Team (Paraşüt Arama Kurtarma Timi)

== Turkmenistan ==
- 152nd Independent Air Assault Brigade (152-я отдельная воздушно-штурмовая бригада - 152-ya Otdel'naya Vozdushno-Shturmovaya Brigada)

== Uganda ==
- Special Forces Command
- "Amilcar Cabral" Airborne School

== Ukraine ==
Insignia of the Ukrainian Air Assault Forces

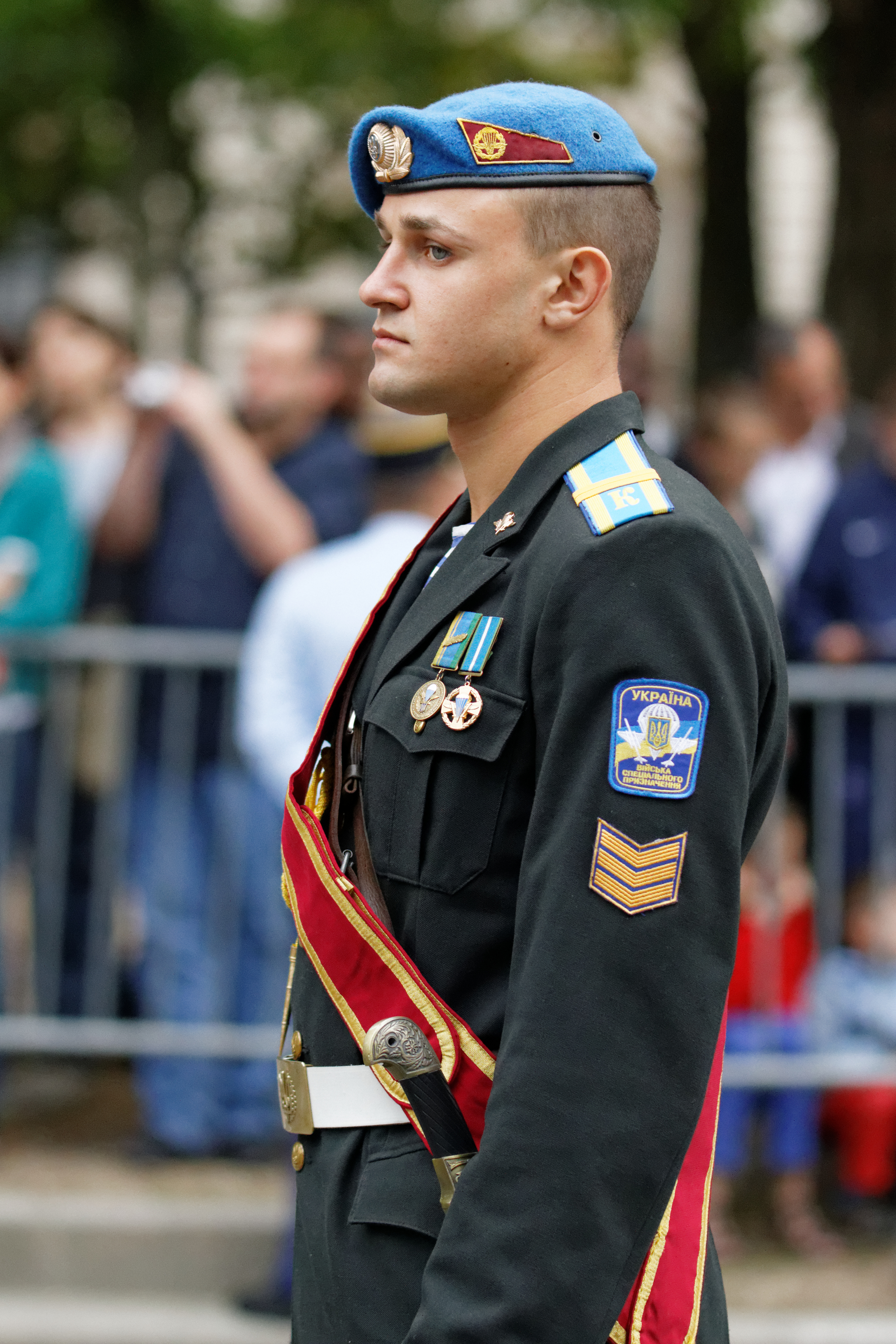
Ukrainian paratrooper in parade dress

- Air Assault Forces
  - 25th Airborne Brigade "Dnipropetrovsk"
  - 45th Air Assault Brigade
  - 46th Air Assault Brigade
  - 79th Air Assault Brigade
  - 80th Air Assault Brigade
  - 81st Airmobile Brigade
  - 95th Air Assault Brigade
  - 132nd Recon Battalion
  - 135th Signals Battalion
  - 199th Training Center
- Special Operations Forces
  - 3rd Special Purpose Regiment
  - 8th Special Purpose Regiment
  - 99th Command and Security Battalion
  - 140th Special Purpose Regiment
  - 142nd Special Operations Forces Training and Formation Center
- Navy
  - 73rd Special Purpose Marine Center "Ataman Antin Holovaty"
- Ukrainian Marine Corps
  - 36th Marine Brigade
    - 36th Airborne Support Platoon
  - 88th Marine Infantry Air Assault Battalion

== United Arab Emirates ==
- Special Mission Unit of the Presidential Guard (وحدة المهام الخاصة - الحرس الرئاسي - Wahdat Almahami Alkhasat - Alharas Alriyasiu)

== United Kingdom ==
British paratrooper brevet

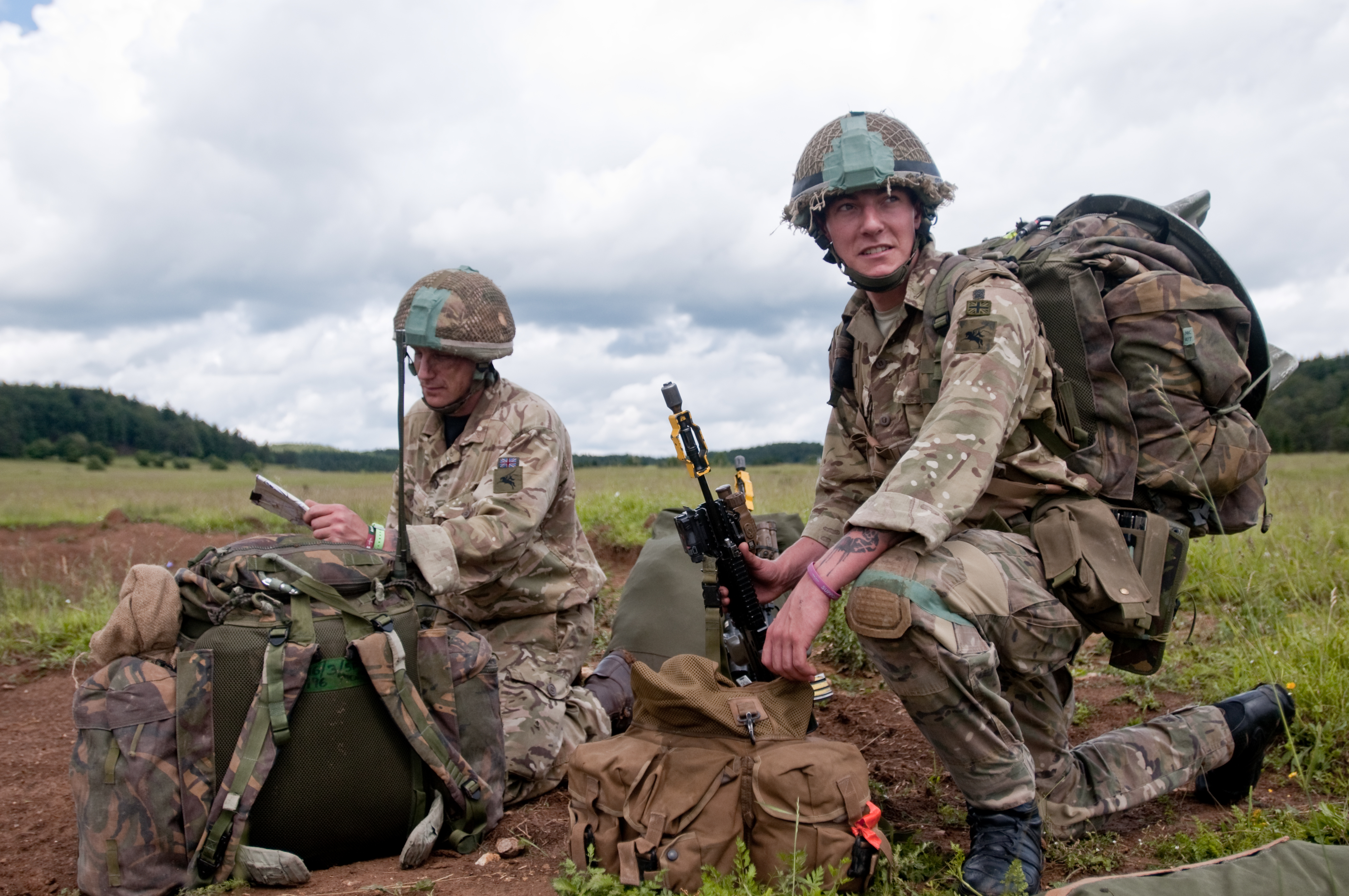
British paratroopers during Swift Response exercise 2016

- British Army
  - 16th Air Assault Brigade
    - 2nd Battalion, The Parachute Regiment
    - 3rd Battalion, The Parachute Regiment, including:
      - No 6 (Guards Parachute) Platoon
    - 4th Battalion, The Parachute Regiment (Reserve)
    - 7th Parachute Regiment Royal Horse Artillery
    - 23 Parachute Engineer Regiment
    - Pathfinder Platoon
    - 216th (Parachute) Signal Squadron
    - 144 Parachute Medical Squadron (Royal Army Medical Corps) (Volunteer)
  - Light Electronic Warfare Teams, 226 Signal Squadron, 14th Cyber Electromagnetic and Electronic Warfare Signal Regiment
  - Airborne Troop, 821 Explosive Ordnance Disposal & Search Squadron, Royal Logistic Corps
  - Parachute Training Support Unit
- Royal Navy
  - Submarine Parachute Assistance Group
  - Fleet Diving Unit 1
  - Royal Marines
    - 3 Commando Brigade Patrol Troop
    - Reconnaissance Troop 40 Commando
    - Reconnaissance Troop 42 Commando
    - Reconnaissance Troop 45 Commando
    - Surveillance Reconnaissance Squadron, 30 Commando Information Exploitation Group
- Royal Air Force
  - No. II Squadron RAF Regiment
  - Airborne Delivery Wing
- Inter-service
  - United Kingdom Special Forces
    - British Army
      - 21 Special Air Service Regiment (Artists) (Reserve)
      - 22 Special Air Service Regiment, including:
        - L Detachment SAS (Reserve)
      - 23 Special Air Service Regiment (Reserve)
      - 63rd Signal Squadron (Reserve)
      - 264 SAS Signal Squadron
    - Royal Navy
      - Royal Marines
        - Special Boat Service
        - Special Boat Service (Reserve)
        - Special Boat Service Signal Squadron
    - Special Forces Support Group
      - 1st Battalion, Parachute Regiment, including:
        - one Royal Marines parachute platoon each in A, B and C companies
        - one RAF Regiment parachute flight (platoon) in B company

== United States ==
US Master Parachutist badge

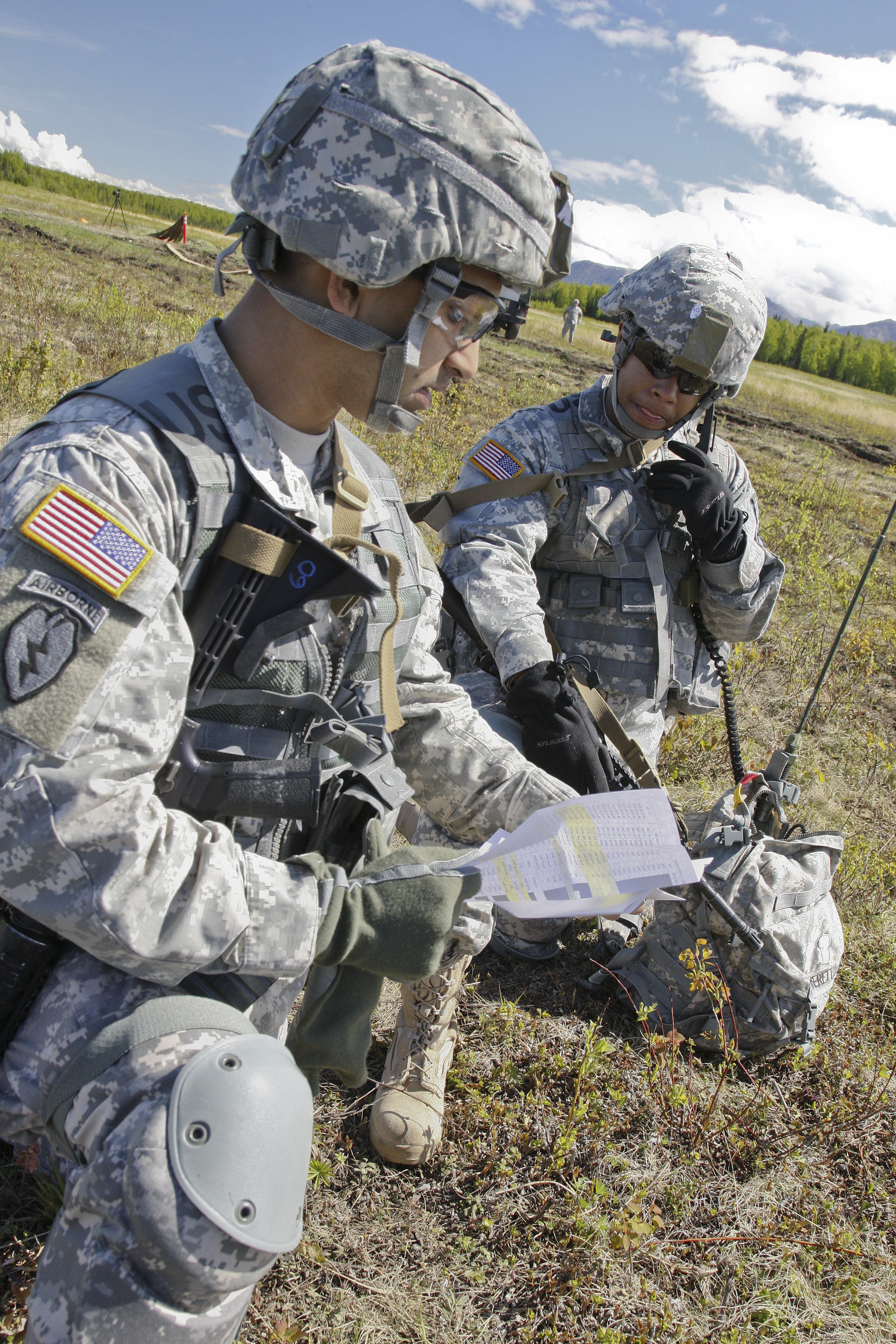
Parachute artillerymen from the 4th IBCT

- Army
  - XVIII Airborne Corps
    - 27th Engineer Battalion (Combat) (Airborne)
    - 82nd Airborne Division
      - 1st Brigade Combat Team "Devil Brigade"
        - 3rd Squadron, 73rd Cavalry Regiment
        - 2nd Battalion, 501st Infantry Regiment
        - 1st Battalion, 504th Infantry Regiment
        - 2nd Battalion, 504th Infantry Regiment
        - 3rd Battalion, 319th Field Artillery Regiment
        - 127th Brigade Engineer Battalion
        - 307th Brigade Support Battalion
      - 2nd Brigade Combat Team "Falcon Brigade"
        - 1st Squadron, 73rd Cavalry Regiment
        - 1st Battalion, 325th Infantry Regiment
        - 2nd Battalion, 325th Infantry Regiment
        - 2nd Battalion, 508th Infantry Regiment
        - 2nd Battalion, 319th Field Artillery Regiment
        - 37th Brigade Engineer Battalion
        - 407th Brigade Support Battalion
      - 3rd Brigade Combat Team "Panther Brigade"
        - 5th Squadron, 73rd Cavalry Regiment
        - 1st Battalion, 505th Infantry Regiment
        - 2nd Battalion, 505th Infantry Regiment
        - 1st Battalion, 508th Infantry Regiment
        - 1st Battalion, 319th Field Artillery Regiment
        - 307th Brigade Engineer Battalion
        - 82nd Brigade Support Battalion
  - 173rd Airborne Brigade Combat Team "Sky Soldiers"
    - 1st Battalion, 503rd Infantry Regiment
    - 2nd Battalion, 503rd Infantry Regiment
    - 3rd Battalion, 504th Infantry Regiment
    - 4th Battalion, 319th Field Artillery Regiment
    - 54th Brigade Engineer Battalion
    - 173rd Brigade Support Battalion
  - 2nd Infantry Brigade Combat Team (Airborne), 11th Airborne Division
    - 1st Squadron, 40th Cavalry Regiment
    - 1st Battalion, 501st Infantry Regiment
    - 3rd Battalion, 509th Infantry Regiment
    - 2nd Battalion, 377th Field Artillery Regiment
    - 6th Brigade Engineer Battalion
    - 725th Brigade Support Battalion
  - 1st Battalion, 509th Infantry Regiment (Airborne) "Geronimo"
  - 1st Battalion, 143rd Infantry Regiment (Texas Army National Guard)
  - Airborne and Ranger Training Brigade
    - United States Army Airborne School
    - United States Army Jumpmaster School
    - United States Army Pathfinder School
  - United States Army Civil Affairs and Psychological Operations Command (Airborne) (Army Reserve)
- Navy
  - Explosive Ordnance Disposal Group One
  - Explosive Ordnance Disposal Group Two
- Marines
  - Force Reconnaissance Company, 1st Reconnaissance Battalion
  - Force Reconnaissance Company, 2nd Reconnaissance Battalion
  - Force Reconnaissance Company, 3rd Reconnaissance Battalion
  - Marines Reserve
    - 3rd Force Reconnaissance Company
    - 4th Force Reconnaissance Company
- Air Force
  - 31st Rescue Squadron (Pararescue)
  - 38th Rescue Squadron (Pararescue)
  - 48th Rescue Squadron (Pararescue)
  - 57th Rescue Squadron (Pararescue)
  - 58th Rescue Squadron (Pararescue)
  - 820th Base Defense Group
    - 820th Combat Operations Squadron
    - 822d Base Defense Squadron
    - 823d Base Defense Squadron
    - 824th Base Defense Squadron
  - Air Force Reserve
    - 304th Rescue Squadron (Pararescue) (AFRC)
    - 306th Rescue Squadron (Pararescue) (AFRC)
    - 308th Rescue Squadron (Pararescue) (AFRC)
  - Air National Guard
    - 103rd Rescue Squadron (Pararescue) (New York ANG)
    - 131st Rescue Squadron (Pararescue) (California ANG)
    - 212th Rescue Squadron (Pararescue) (Alaska ANG)
- United States Special Operations Command
  - Joint Special Operations Command
    - Army
      - 1st Special Forces Operational Detachment Delta (Airborne)
      - Regimental Reconnaissance Company, 75th Ranger Regiment
    - Navy
      - Naval Special Warfare Development Group
    - Air Force
      - 24th Special Tactics Squadron
  - US Army Special Operations Command
    - 75th Ranger Regiment
    - 2nd Battalion, 2nd Special Warfare Training Group (Airborne) including:
      - Military Free Fall School
    - 1st Special Forces Command (Airborne)
      - 1st Special Forces Group (Airborne), 1st Special Forces Regiment
      - 3rd Special Forces Group (Airborne), 1st Special Forces Regiment
      - 5th Special Forces Group (Airborne), 1st Special Forces Regiment
      - 7th Special Forces Group (Airborne), 1st Special Forces Regiment
      - 10th Special Forces Group (Airborne), 1st Special Forces Regiment
      - 19th Special Forces Group (Airborne), 1st Special Forces Regiment (Army National Guard)
      - 20th Special Forces Group (Airborne), 1st Special Forces Regiment (Army National Guard)
      - 39th Special Forces Detachment (Airborne), 1st Special Forces Regiment
      - 112th Special Operations Signal Battalion (Airborne)
      - 389th Military Intelligence Battalion (Airborne)
    - Special Operations Detachment - Africa (Airborne) (Texas ARNG)
    - Special Operations Detachment - Central (Airborne) (Florida ARNG)
    - Special Operations Detachment - Europe (Airborne) (West Virginia ARNG)
    - Special Operations Detachment - Global (Airborne) (Rhode Island ARNG)
    - Special Operations Detachment - Joint (Airborne) (Maryland ARNG)
    - Special Operations Detachment - Korea (Airborne) (Colorado ARNG)
    - Special Operations Detachment - North (Airborne) (California ARNG)
    - Special Operations Detachment - Pacific (Airborne) (Washington ARNG)
    - Special Operations Detachment - South (Airborne) (Mississippi ARNG)
    - Special Operations Detachment - X (Airborne) (North Carolina ARNG)
  - United States Naval Special Warfare Command
    - Naval Special Warfare Group 1
      - SEAL Team 1
      - SEAL Team 3
      - SEAL Team 5
      - SEAL Team 7
      - Naval Special Warfare Unit 1 (Note: Permanent overseas holding unit, serving as provisional HQ element for the US Navy SEALs detachments assigned to its operational areas.)
      - Naval Special Warfare Unit 3
    - Naval Special Warfare Group 2
      - SEAL Team 2
      - SEAL Team 4
      - SEAL Team 8
      - SEAL Team 10
      - Naval Special Warfare Unit 2
    - Naval Special Warfare Group 3
      - SEAL Delivery Vehicle Team One
      - SEAL Delivery Vehicle Team Two
    - Naval Special Warfare Group 4
      - Special Boat Team 12
      - Special Boat Team 20
      - Special Boat Team 22
    - Naval Special Warfare Group 11 (Navy Reserve)
      - SEAL Team 17
      - SEAL Team 18
  - United States Marine Corps Forces Special Operations Command
    - Marine Raider Regiment
      - 1st Marine Raider Battalion
      - 2nd Marine Raider Battalion
      - 3rd Marine Raider Battalion
      - Marine Raider Training Center
  - Air Force Special Operations Command
    - 24th Special Operations Wing
      - 720th Special Tactics Group
        - 17th Special Tactics Squadron
        - 21st Special Tactics Squadron
        - 22nd Special Tactics Squadron
        - 23rd Special Tactics Squadron
        - 26th Special Tactics Squadron
    - 193rd Special Operations Wing (Pennsylvania ANG)
      - 123rd Special Tactics Squadron (Kentucky ANG)
      - 125th Special Tactics Squadron (Oregon ANG)
    - 352nd Special Operations Wing
      - 321st Special Tactics Squadron
    - 353d Special Operations Wing
      - 320th Special Tactics Squadron

== Uruguay ==
Army

- 14th Parachute Infantry Battalion (Batallón de Infantería Paracaidista Nº14), including:
  - Special Operations Company "Scorpion" (Compañía de Operaciones Especiales "Escorpión")
  - Army Paratroopers and Special Operations Training Center (Centro de Instrucción de Paracaidistas y Operaciones Especiales del Ejército)

Air Force

- Special Operations Company (Compañía de Operaciones Especiales)
- Rescue Operations and Training Section (Seccion de Operaciones y Entrenamiento de Rescate)

== Uzbekistan ==
- 17th Air Assault Brigade (17-Havo Hujumi Brigadasi)
- Independent Special Purpose Battalion "Lynx" (Maxsus Operatsiyalar Bo'limi "Kaplan")

== Venezuela ==
- Army
  - 42nd Parachute Infantry Brigade (42 Brigada de Infantería Paracaidista)
    - Brigade HQ
    - 421st Parachute Infantry Battalion "José Leonardo Chirino" (421 Batallón de Infantería Paracaidista "José Leonardo Chirino")
    - 422nd Parachute Infantry Battalion "Colonel Antonio Nicolás Briceño" (422 Batallón de Infantería Paracaidista "Coronel Antonio Nicolás Briceño")
    - 423rd Parachute Infantry Battalion "Colonel Ramón García de Sena" (423 Batallón de Infantería Paracaidista "Coronel Ramón García de Sena")
    - 4201st Parachute Headquarters Company (4201 Compañía de Comando Paracaidistas")
    - 4202nd Parachute Scout and Reconnaissance Company (4202 Compañía de Exploración y Reconocimiento Paracaidistas)
    - 4203rd Parachute Supply and Transportation Company (4203 Compañía de Abastecimiento y Transporte Paracaidistas)
    - 4204th Parachute Signal Company (4204 Compañía de Comunicaciones Paracaidistas)
    - 4207th Parachute Engineers Company (4207 Compañía de Ingenieros Paracaidistas)
    - 4208th Packaging, Maintenance and Air Delivery Company (4208 Compañía de Empaque, Mantenimiento y Entrega Aérea)
    - 4209th Parachute Snipers Company (4209 Compañía de Francotiradores Paracaidistas)
    - 4210th Parachute Medical Company (4210 Compañía de Sanidad Paracaidistas)
  - Combat and Airborne Operations Training Center "Brigadier General Rafael Nogales Méndez" (Centro de Adiestriamento de Combate y de Operaciones Aerotransportadas "General de Brigada Rafael Nogales Méndez")
- Special Operations Command "General in Chief Félix Antonio Velásquez" (Comando de Operaciones Especiales "General en Jefe Félix Antonio Velásquez")
  - Army
    - 99th Special Forces Brigade (99 Brigada de Fuerzas Especiales)
      - 991st Special Forces Battalion "Colonel Domingo Montes" (991 Batallón de Fuerzas Especiales "Coronel Domingo Montes")
      - 992nd Special Forces Battalion "General in Chief José Gregorio Monagas" (992 Batallón de Fuerzas Especiales "General en Jefe José Gregorio Monagas")
      - 993rd Special Forces Battalion "Lieutenant Colonel Eliezer Otaiza Castillo" (993 Batallón de Fuerzas Especiales "Teniente Coronel Eliezer Otaiza Castillo")
  - Navy
    - 8th Marine Special Operations Brigade "Generalissimo Francisco de Miranda" (8 Brigada de Comandos del Mar "Generalísimo Francisco de Miranda")
      - 81st Special Operations Battalion "Lieutenant Commander Henry Lilong García" (Batallón de Operaciones Especiales Nro. 81 "Capitán de Corbeta Henry Lilong García")
  - Air Force
    - 20th Special Forces Group (Grupo de Fuerzas Especiales N.º 20)
  - National Guard
    - Commando Operations Group (Grupo de Acciones de Comando)

== Vietnam ==
- 1st Special Forces Brigade. (Lữ đoàn Đặc công 1)
- 113th Special Forces Brigade (Lữ đoàn Đặc công 113)
- 198th Special Forces Brigade (Lữ đoàn Đặc công 198)
- 429th Special Forces Brigade (Lữ đoàn Đặc công 429)

== Zambia ==
- 1st Commando Battalion

== Zimbabwe ==
- Parachute Regiment
- Special Air Service Squadron

== See also ==
- List of CBRN warfare forces
- List of cyber warfare forces
- List of marines and similar forces
- List of mountain warfare forces
