= South African Special Forces =

Military forces of the Republic of South Africa

South African Special Forces Brigade
- South African Special Forces insignia
- Founded: 1 October 1972; 53 years ago
- Country: South Africa
- Branch: SA National Defence Force-Joint Operations Division
- Type: Special forces
- Size: 4 Special Forces Regiment ("Iron fist from the sea"); 5 Special Forces Regiment ("We fear naught but God")
- Part of: Joint Operations Division
- HQ: Speskop, Pretoria, Gauteng (Brigade HQ)
- Nickname: Recces
- Engagements: South African Border War; Rhodesian Bush War; Angolan Civil War; Mozambican Civil War; Séléka rebellion; M23 rebellion; Insurgency in Cabo Delgado

Insignia
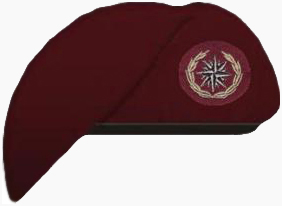
- Beret

The South African Special Forces Brigade, colloquially known as the Recces (from "reconnaissance"), is South Africa's principal military special operations unit specialising in various types of operations, including counter-insurgency, counter terrorism, direct action, long-range reconnaissance, special reconnaissance, unconventional warfare, and hostage rescue. The brigade operates with two active-duty groups, with 4 Special Forces Regiment focusing on maritime operations, and 5 Special Forces Regiment focusing on land and airborne operations. Only about 8% of recruits who undergo South African special forces training pass the course.

The South African Special Forces Brigade has its roots in the Hunter Group, which was formed in 1968 as an elite counter-insurgency unit of the South African Army. The success of this unit culminated in the subsequent formation of five reconnaissance units, known widely as "Recces", during the 1970s. South African special forces carried out a number of combat operations during the Rhodesian Bush War, the South African Border War, and the Mozambican Civil War.

The Special Forces Brigade's current structure is the result of extensive restructuring related to the integration of the South African National Defence Force (SANDF) between 1992 and 1996. Elements of the brigade are expanded into two additional groups; though termed "regiments", they consist only of small numbers of operators who are secretive, seldom photographed, and expertly trained. The current regiments include 4 Special Forces Regiment based at Langebaan in Western Cape Province, and 5 Special Forces Regiment based at Phalaborwa in the eastern part of the province of Limpopo.

Special forces are directly under the command of the Joint Operations Division of the SANDF, and unlike other similar forces worldwide, are not a part of the South African Army nor the South African Navy, but are rather operated as its own branch/service within the SANDF.

== History ==
The first South African Special Forces unit, 1 Reconnaissance Commando, was established in the town of Oudtshoorn, Cape Province on 1 October 1972. On 1 January 1975, this unit was relocated to Durban, Natal, where it continued its activities as the airborne specialist unit of the special forces.

Later, five additional Reconnaissance Commandos were formed:

- 2 Reconnaissance Commando (Citizen Force) – was established in Johannesburg. It was later retired due to rationalisation and the discontinuation of the Citizen Force unit concept
- 3 Reconnaissance Commando (consisting of former Rhodesian Selous Scouts) – was established in Phalaborwa. An attempt to integrate this unit into the South African Military was largely unsuccessful. The unit was disbanded in 1981, and the limited number of remaining personnel were incorporated into the other Special Forces unit.
- 4 Reconnaissance Commando, specialising in seaborne operations, was established in the coastal town of Langebaan, Cape Province.
- 5 Reconnaissance Commando was established at Duku-Duku camp in Natal, but was later moved to Phalaborwa in the Transvaal province.
- 6 Reconnaissance Commando (consisting of former Rhodesian Special Air Service) – was established in Durban. An attempt to integrate this unit into the South African Military was largely unsuccessful. It was disbanded in 1981, and the limited number of remaining personnel were incorporated into the other Special Forces units.

Many white members of the Rhodesian special forces were recruited into the SADF in 1980 as part of Operation Winter and served with the South African Special Forces.

On 1 January 1981, a re-organisation of Special Forces took place, as part of which the Reconnaissance Commandos and other special forces were transformed into an independent formation, directly under the command of the (then) South African Defence Force (instead of the South African Army). As part of the re-organisation, the various Reconnaissance Commandos were also given the status of regiments. In the latter part of the same decade, a Special Forces headquarters and a Special Forces stores depot were also added to the Special Forces structure.

Between the years 1981 and 1990, Special Forces was home to unconventional operations such as Project Barnacle, the Civil Cooperation Bureau and other operations conducted under the aegis of 7 Medical Battalion Group.

In 1991, the structure of the special forces underwent another change, when the special forces headquarters was disbanded and a Directorate Reconnaissance, reporting directly to the Chief of the Army, was established instead.

Another organisational change followed in 1993, when the Directorate Reconnaissance became 45 Parachute Brigade. As a result of this, all the units were renamed: 1 Reconnaissance Regiment became 452 Parachute Battalion, 4 Reconnaissance Regiment became 453 Parachute Battalion and 5 Reconnaissance Regiment became 451 Parachute Battalion.

As part of the military rationalization process, 1 Special Forces Regiment was disbanded in 1996. Its personnel were incorporated into the other Special Forces Regiments.

In 1997, the Special Forces School was transferred to 5 Special Forces Regiment upon the retirement of 1 Special Forces Regiment where the School had previously been based. The Special Forces School was transferred out of 5 Special Forces Regiment in 2002, to become a stand-alone unit.

== Structure ==
The Special Forces Brigade, as it is now known, consists of:

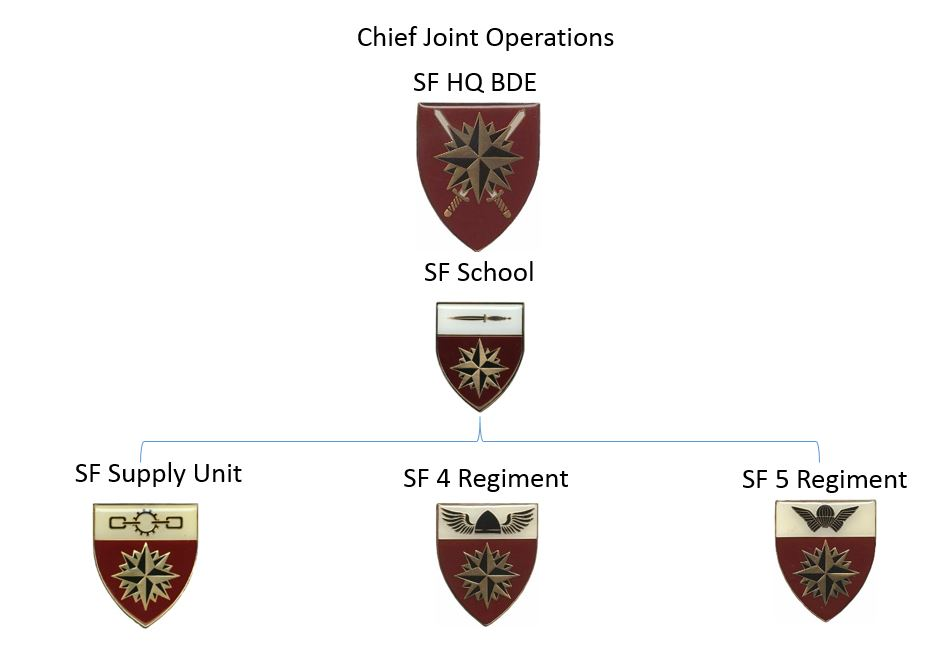

=== Headquarters ===
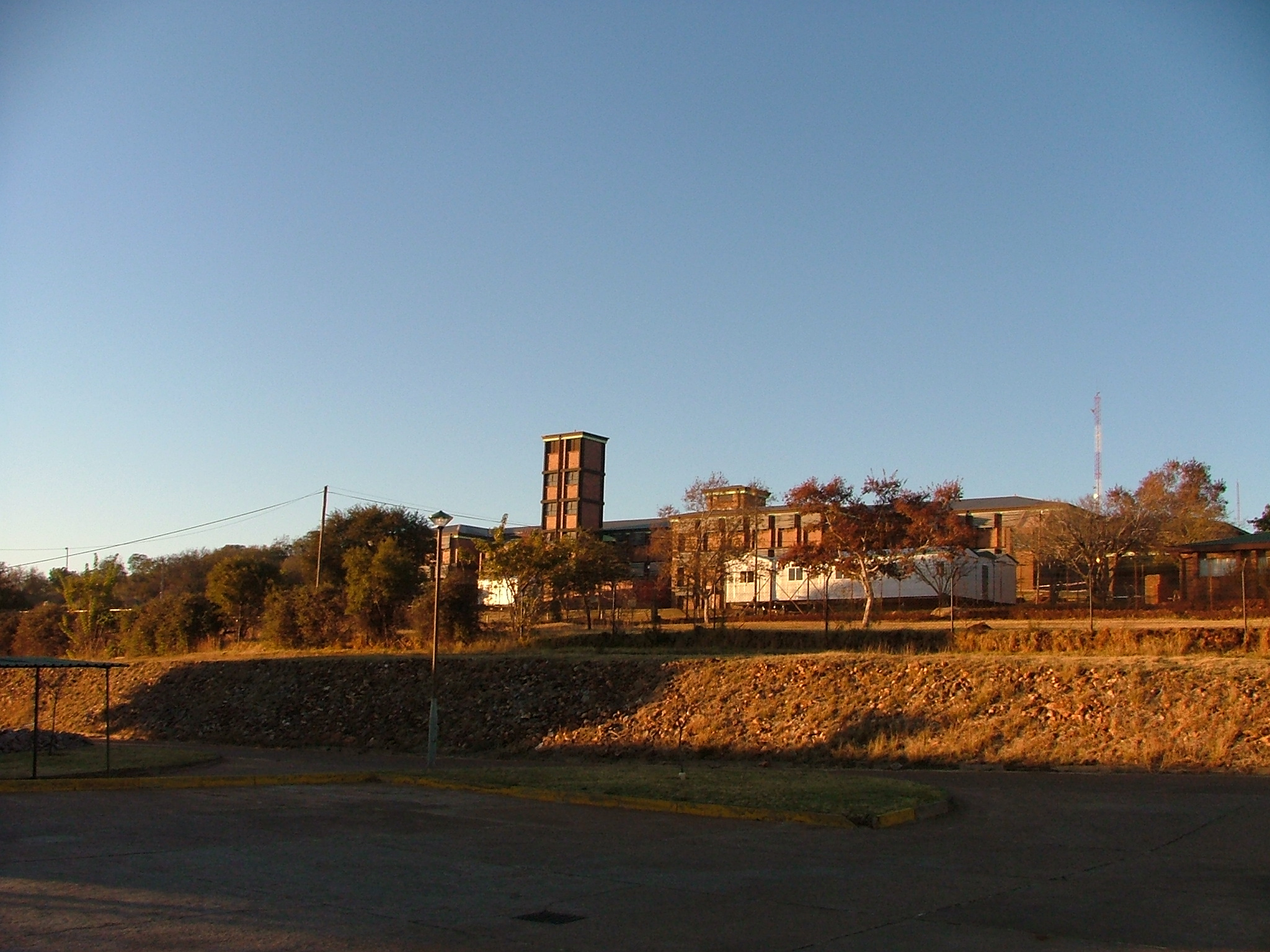
South African Special Forces Brigade HQ, Pretoria

Based in Pretoria. The General Officer Commanding (GOC) Special Forces commands, controls and coordinates the activities of the various SF Regiments from a headquarters (HQ) located in the Swartkop Park nature reserve on the southwestern outskirts of Pretoria. Colloquially called "Speskop", the headquarters also houses the Special Forces' operational planning as well as administrative support staffs.

=== 4 Special Forces Regiment ===
4 Special Forces Regiment is based in Langebaan, Saldanha Bay, on the west coast north of Cape Town. It provides South Africa its seaward Special Forces capability. The unit was established at Langebaan in 1978. The Regiment consists of three operational commandos (companies) as well as a Special Forces Amphibious and Urban School.

=== 5 Special Forces Regiment ===
5 Special Forces Regiment is based in Phalaborwa in the east of the northern Limpopo Province, and was established in Durban in 1976. After a sojourn at Duku Duku in northern KwaZulu-Natal, the unit moved into its present lines in 1980. Its post-2002 structure provides for two operational commandos, called 51 Commando and 52 Commando respectively, and a training wing. It specialises in overland operations, especially long-range infiltration, intelligence gathering and airborne operations.

=== South African Special Forces Reserve ===
Retired Special Forces personnel form part of the Special Forces Reserve. They are assigned to the various Special Forces Regiments as required.

=== South African Special Forces School ===
Based in Murrayhill, the South African Special Forces School is responsible for the presentation of the Special Forces Pre-Selection and Selection courses and ongoing training.

=== South African Special Forces Supply Unit ===
The South African Special Forces Supply Unit provides logistical support and is based in Walmansthal, North of Pretoria.

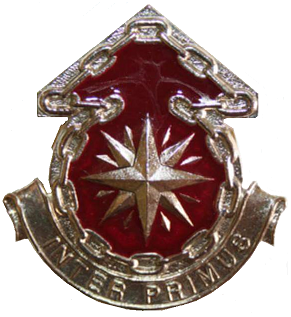
Special Forces Supply Unit beret badge circa 1990

In the Special Forces regiments, leadership positions, especially at team (section) and group (platoon) level, have traditionally been dictated more by ability and experience than rank. This has, on occasion, resulted in Operators more senior in rank being assigned to groups or teams commanded by Operators junior to them in rank but more seasoned in operational experience or actual command.

== Selection and training ==
The Ultimate Challenge, as South African Special Forces Selection is often called, is considered one of the most difficult special forces selection courses in the world. A soldier must meet very high requirements to even attend Special Forces Selection. In accordance with SANDF regulations, only South African citizens under a certain age are permitted to apply.

=== Pre-selection testing ===
This includes all aspects of psychological and physical tests. For the psychological tests, soldiers are given written tests and oral interviews with Special Forces NCOs. A soldier must be self-controlled and mature. Soldiers are ejected from the course if there is any suggestion of mental instability. The Physical Test includes for example 50 continuous push ups without breaking rhythm, 67 sit ups in two minutes, 175-metre fireman's lift run within 65 seconds, 5-kilometre run within 24 minutes, a rope climb and 40 six-metre shuttle runs in 95 seconds. A student must also scale a 10-foot-high (3.0 m) wall, complete a fifteen-kilometre march in less than 120 minutes and perform 120 shuttle kicks.

=== Parachute selection course ===
All Special Forces candidates who aren't already parachute-qualified have to attend, and pass, the Basic Parachute School.

=== Special Forces selection ===
Selection is an event during which candidates are placed in an extremely mentally and physically demanding set of situations and circumstances, through which they must pass. It is in duration approximately a week.

For the duration of Selection, the candidates do not sleep or eat, and have no rest period at all. Only an extremely small percentage of those who begin Selection ever pass it. In some years, no-one has managed to pass Selection, and there are other cases where only one or two out of an entire Selection group of approximately 120 have passed.

=== Training cycle ===
Once past the Selection process, an aspiring operator will be placed on a training cycle to acquire the skills required. These include: air co-operation, water orientation, obstacle crossing, bushcraft, tracking and survival, demolitions and tactics in urban as well as rural areas.

Advanced Airborne Training: a recruit will attend courses in military free-fall such as HALO and HAHO. They will also learn about helicopter operations – how to descend by means of a rope out of helicopters (fast-roping and rappel ). Combat extraction is also taught, along with learning how to set up a Landing Zone.

Land training consists of many things: including sniping, demolitions and reconnaissance. Bushcraft and survival is also taught. Climbing and photography are taught to new recruits. Urban and rural combat is perhaps the newest training – developed quite recently, this training provided South Africa with a new counter-terrorist force. Medical and communications training is also given to those who wish to become qualified in these fields.

Maritime training consists of the use of small boats, underwater demolitions, swimming, combat diving, diving, beach reconnaissance and navigation.

== Operations ==
=== 1973–94 SADF Operations ===
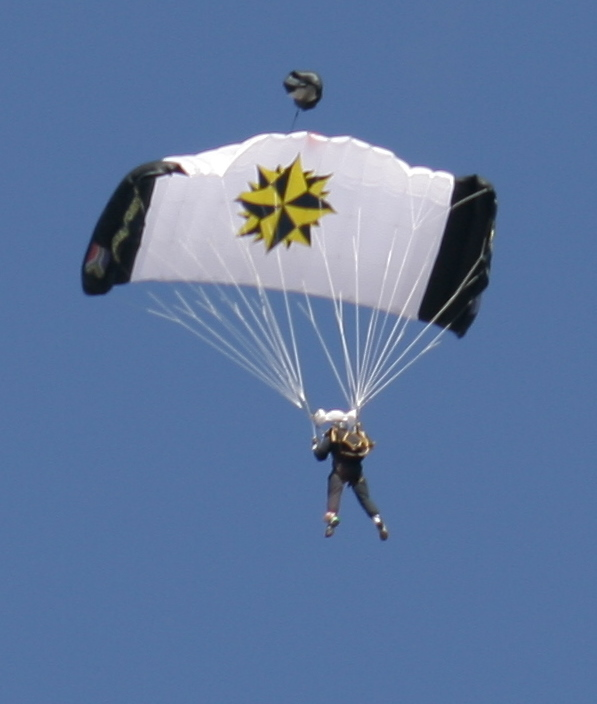
Member of the South African Special Forces performing a ceremonial parachute jump

The South African "Recces" were deployed to many local hot spots during the late 1970s and early 1980s, particularly Angola.

The main enemy then was South West Africa's People Organization, whose armed wing PLAN was a guerrilla organization fighting for an independent Namibia.

One of the "Recces"' most effective operations came in 1982: Operation Mebos penetrated deep into Angola and destroyed the SWAPO Headquarters. In Operation Askari, in the winter of 1984, the "Recces" cut off almost all supply lines to and from the SWAPO in Angola. In May 1985, a "Recce" team undertook the controversial Operation Argon, a failed attempt to sabotage Angolan oil installations run by Gulf Oil.

In early summer of 1985, another "Recce" team under the command of SADF Captain André Diedericks crossed into Angola's Cuando Cubango province, and with UNITA's help, protection and escort was secretly deployed around Menongue area. The team had at their disposal the 9K31 "Strela-1" AA system manned and operated by the team members. The Team's mission was to carry out covert combat operations, code names "Catamaran 1," "Catamaran 2" and "Cerberus" with the goal of disrupting air traffic in Cuando Cubango province by shooting down air transports, combat aircraft and gunships using the AA system.

On 11 June 1985, roughly 80 km (50 mi) from Menongue, the team shot down an Angolan airplane, a light utility aircraft, Britten-Norman BN-2 "Islander". The "Islander", en route from Menongue to Cuito Cuanavale with a crew of 2 and 5 passengers, was also carrying 69 million kwanzas (Angola's currency), several months of salary for FAPLA's 16th Brigade's personnel based in Cuito Cuanavale. When the "Islander" fell to the ground the money was stolen and the remains of the dead passengers had been pillaged by UNITA soldiers attached to protect the "Recce" team. On 25 November 1985, the same "Recce" team had also shot down an "Aeroflot" Antonov AN-12 of the Soviet Air Force. The AN-12 transport, which was en route from Cuito Cuanavale to Luanda carrying 8 crew members and 13 passengers, crashed approximately 43 km (27 mi) south-east of Menongue. All people on board (twelve Soviet and nine Angolan nationals) died in the crash.

=== Post-1994 SANDF Operations ===
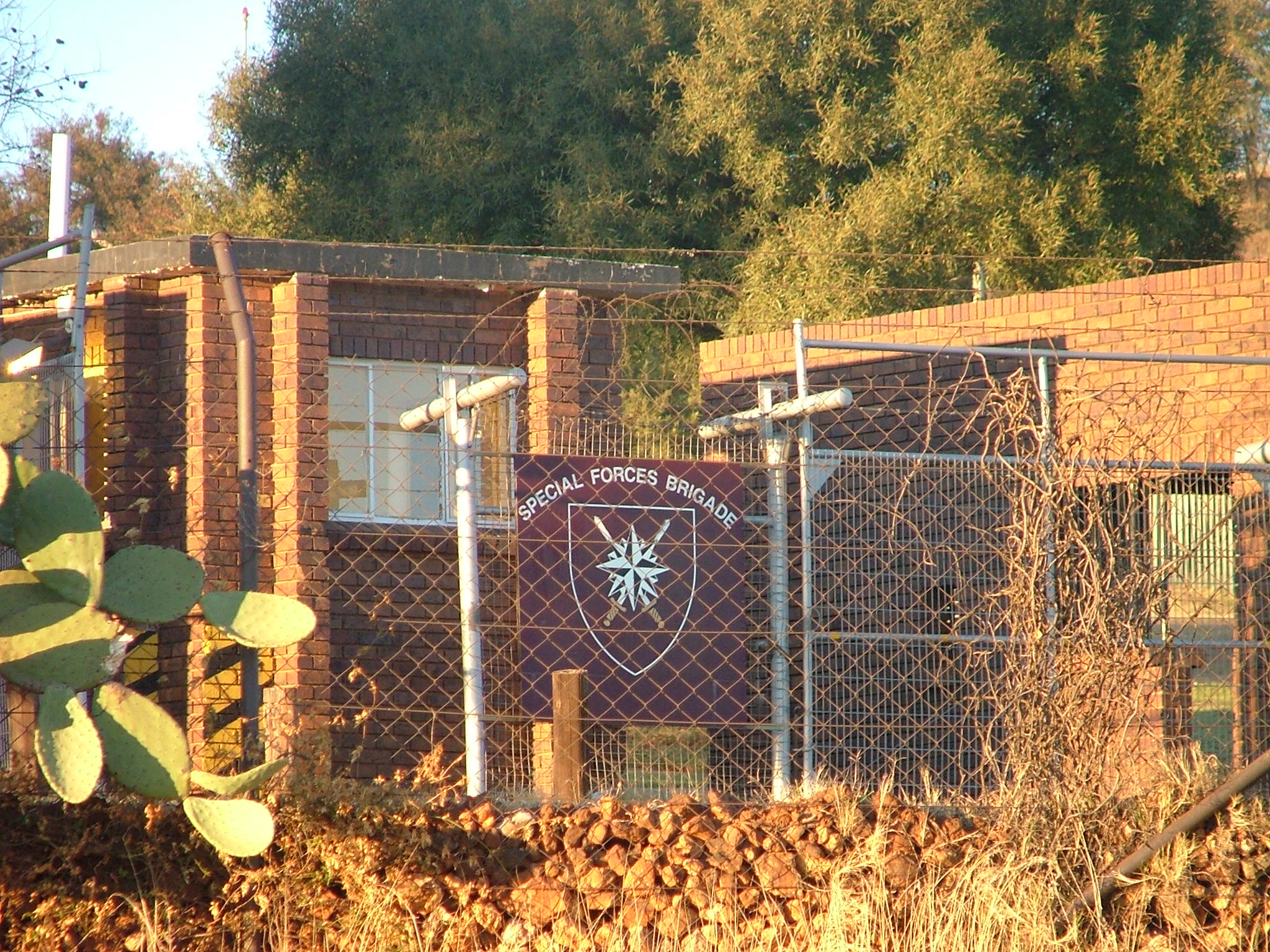
South African Special Forces Brigade HQ, Pretoria.

==== Central African Republic ====
Operators of the South African Special Forces were involved in direct action against the Séléka rebels in the Fight for Bangui during the South African military assistance to the Central African Republic. No South African Special Forces operators were killed in the operation. All casualties were attributed to 1 Parachute Battalion which lost 13 soldiers, with a further 27 injured, during pitched battles on the outskirts of the capital, Bangui.

==== Democratic Republic of the Congo ====
The South African Special Forces were integral to the Battle of Kibati, which saw about 3000 M23 rebels defeated by several thousand members of the Force Intervention Brigade supported by local troops. An operator of the SASF, as part of the FIB, made the 8th longest recorded sniper kill in history with a confirmed distance of 2,125 m (2,324 yd) using a South African made Denel NTW-20 anti-materiel rifle in its 14.5 mm (0.57 in) configuration. SASF still continue to operate in the country.

==== Mozambique ====
SASF teams were deployed to Cabo Delgado Province under Operation Vikela. On 20 December 2021 an operator, corporal Tebogo Edwin Radebe, was killed in action. His death represents the first SASF operator to be killed in action since corporal Hermann Carstens in 1989. The SASF have since engaged ISIS-Mozambique in small skirmishes, resulting in many enemy losses.

== Insignia ==
=== Operator's Badge ===
Standard Silver South African Special Forces Operator's Badge

All members who complete all the required qualifications to become a Special Forces Operator, are awarded an "Operator's Badge". Each badge is numbered and a register of the numbers and who they have been awarded to is kept. The badge consists of an inverted Commando Knife within a laurel wreath, which is meant to symbolise both special forces (the knife) and victory (the wreath).

Standard operator badges are silver, but a gold badge with an embedded diamond is awarded to Operators with more than 10 years of active service.

The latest badges designed for wear on the camouflage combat dress are black embossed plastic on a thatch green background.

SA Special Forces Operator's Badge (Qualification) Black on Thatch beige, Embossed. Dagger enclosed with a laurel wreath	SA Special Forces Operator's Badge (Qualification) Gold, 10 Years. Black on Thatch beige, Embossed. Dagger enclosed with a laurel wreath. Exclusion to indicate diamond on Dagger blade.

=== Attack Diver ===
Attack Diver (Qualification) Bronze. Black on Thatch beige, Embossed. The badge depicts a great white shark swimming past the Neptune trident, which is mounted on the mouthpiece of an Oxygears 57 and is enclosed within the tubes of the Oxygears 57	Attack Diver Instructor Badge (Qualification) Silver; Black Circle indicates Instructor. Black on Thatch beige, Embossed. The badge depicts a great white shark swimming past the Neptune trident, which is mounted on the mouthpiece of an Oxygears 57 and is enclosed within the tubes of the Oxygears 57

=== Demolitions ===
Explosive Ordnance Disposal (EOD) (Qualification) EOD Badge. Black on Thatch beige, Embossed. Ring and bomb, facing down, with lightning flash	Demolitions (Qualification) Level 2 (DEMS2) - Tactical Demolitions. Black on Thatch beige, Embossed. The badge uses the traditional 9 flames exploding grenade, which is superimposed over two crossed lightning bolts across the exploding grenade	Improvised Explosive Device Disposal (IEDD) (Qualification) IEDD Badge. Black on Thatch beige, Embossed. The badge uses the traditional 9 flames exploding grenade, which is superimposed, over two crossed lightning bolts. A watch dial, with hour markings, encircles the exploding grenade

=== Tracking ===
Tracker (Qualification) Black on Thatch beige, Embossed. Chevron footprint	Tracker Instructor (Qualification) Instructor. Black on Thatch beige, Embossed. Chevron footprint with a black circle surrounding the footprint

=== Additional proficiency badges ===
Sniper (Qualification) Black on Thatch beige, Embossed. Black rifle and laurel wreath	1st Class Shot – Rifle (Proficiency) 1^{st} Class Marksman. Black on Thatch beige, Embossed. Black (Black rifle), with a black rectangle surrounding the rifle	Free Fall Paratrooper (Qualification) Advanced, Freefall. Black on Thatch beige. Small Black wings

Forward Air Controller (Qualification) Yellow triangle with two yellow lines on thatch background	Submarine Operator

== Known equipment ==
=== Weaponry ===
Name	Type	Caliber	Origin	Photo	Notes
Vektor Z88	Semi-Automatic Pistol	9×19mm Parabellum	(South Africa)		15-round Magazine. License-built Beretta 92F.
Glock 17	Semi-Automatic Pistol	9×19mm Parabellum	(Austria)		Various optics and attachments used.
SIG Sauer P226	Semi-Automatic Pistol	9×19mm Parabellum	(Germany)		
Heckler & Koch MP5	Submachine Gun	9×19mm Parabellum	(Germany)		MP5SD6 Suppressed Variant
R1	Designated Marksman Rifle	7.62×51mm NATO	(South Africa)		FN-FAL made under licence. Various barrel lengths (mainly 16 and 21 inch). Updated version using a folding/collapsible stock, railed handguard and dustcover, and Trijicon ACOG TA11
Vektor R4 and R5 assault rifles	Assault Rifle	5.56×45mm	(South Africa)	Illustration of modernized Vektor R5	Updated version with folding/collapsible stock, railed handguard, and side-mounted rail equipped with Trijicon ACOG TA11.
CZ BREN 2	Assault Rifle	7.62×39mm 5.56×45mm	(Czech Republic)		
M16A2	Assault Rifle	5.56×45mm	(United States)		Likely received from Moroccan stocks.
AKM	Assault Rifle	7.62×39mm	(Soviet Union)		Multiple variants.
Denel Land Systems SS-77	General Purpose Machine Gun	7.62×51mm NATO	(South Africa)		
FN MAG	General Purpose Machine Gun	7.62×51mm NATO	(Belgium)		
PK	General Purpose Machine Gun	7.62×54mmR	(Soviet Union)		Multiple variants
Arctic Warfare Magnum	Sniper rifle		(United Kingdom)		
Truvelo Armoury CMS	Sniper rifle		(South Africa)		
Denel Land Systems NTW-20	Anti-Materiel Rifle	20x82mm14.5×114mm	(South Africa)		
M2 Browning	Heavy Machine Gun	12.7×99mm NATO	(United States)		Mounted on Hornet Rapid Deployment Reconnaissance Vehicle
Kord	Heavy Machine Gun	12.7×108mm	(Russia)		
KPV	Heavy Machine Gun	14.5×114mm	(Soviet Union)		ZPU-2 mounted to Toyota Land Cruiser 79, called GOAT 14.5 (Gun on a truck).
ZU-23-2	Anti-Aircraft Gun	23×152mm	(Soviet Union)		Mounted to Toyota Land Cruiser 79, called GOAT 23 (Gun on a truck).
RPG-7	Rocket Propelled Grenade Launcher	40mm	(Soviet Union)		
Type 63 multiple rocket launcher	Multiple Rocket Launcher System	107mm	(China)		Mechem Developments Variant mounted on various vehicles
MILAN ER	Anti-tank guided missile		(France)		Extended range (3000 m) with the ADT launcher
Thales Scorpion	Automated Mortar Weapons Platform		(South Africa) (France)		Mounted on the chassis of a Light Armoured Tactical Vehicle Toyota Land Cruiser

=== Vehicles ===
Name	Type	Origin	Photo	Notes
Casspir	Mine-Resistant Armoured Personnel Carrier	(South Africa)		Multiple variants in use
Hornet (RDRV)	Rapid Deployment Reconnaissance Vehicle	(South Africa)		
Gecko (RDLV)	Rapid Deployment Logistic Vehicle	(South Africa)		
Toyota Land Cruiser	Light Armoured Tactical Vehicle	(South Africa) (Japan)		
SAMIL 100	Armoured Military Truck	(South Africa)		

== Leadership ==
=== Brigade ===
South African Special Forces Brigade Leadership
From	General Officers Commanding	To	Ribbon
2003	Brigadier General Krubert Nel SD,SM,MMM	2006	Southern Cross Decoration SD Southern Cross Medal SM Military Merit Medal MMM
nd	Brigadier General Rudzani Maphwanya SM,MMM (Note: Later General and Chief of the SANDF)	nd	Southern Cross Medal SM Military Merit Medal MMM
From	Chiefs of Staff	To	Ribbon
1998	Col Krubert Nel SD,SM,MMM	2003	Southern Cross Decoration SD Southern Cross Medal SM Military Merit Medal MMM
2003	Col Renier 'Doibi' Coetzee SM,PS,MMM (Note: Later Brigadier General)	2014	Southern Cross Medal SM iPhrothiya yeSiliva PS Military Merit Medal MMM
2014	Unknown	n.d.	

=== Regiments ===
4 Special Forces Regiment Leadership
From	Officers Commanding	To	Ribbon
1978	Cmdt M Kinghorn	1982	
1982	Col J Venter	1994	
1994	Col K Nel	nd	

5 Special Forces Regiment Leadership
From	Officers Commanding	To	Ribbon
5 December 1976	Cmdt P.J. Verster	31 December 1980	
1 January 1981	Cmdt H.M. Blaauw	30 April 1981	
1 May 1981	Cmdt H.W. Snyders	31 December 1982	
1 January 1983	Cmdt A.G. Sachse	31 December 1983	
1 January 1984	Col J.R. Hills	31 December 1988	
1 January 1989	Col C.A.J. Meerholtz	21 November 1989	
1 January 1990	Col A G. Sachse	31 December 1993	
1 January 1994	Col J.W. Englebrecht	31 January 1998	
1 Feb 1998	Col R.J. Coetzee SM,PS,MMM (Note: Known universally by his nicknames Doibi and CoJack)	31 December 2005	Southern Cross Medal SM iPhrothiya yeSiliva PS Military Merit Medal MMM
1 January 2006	Col J.P. Spangenberg	14 May 2009	
15 May 2009	Col S.M. Maloma	11 June 2014	
12 June 2014	Col H.D. Mashego	x	
From	Regimental Sergeant's Major	To	Ribbon
5 December 1976	WO1 J.L. Conradie	2 May 1978	
1 July 1978	WO1 J.J. Moorcroft	5 December 1991	
1 January 1992	WO1 G J. Kitching	13 January 1995	
16 January 1995	WO1 J.J. Teilge	31 December 1996	
1 January 1997	WO1 G.D. Adam	x8 December 2000	
8 December 2000	MWO M. Dyantyi	14 May 2009	
15 May 2009	MWO M. Mntambo	x	

== Disbanded units ==
Special Forces Leadership
From	General Officers Commanding Special Forces (Note: GOC Special Forces was directly responsible to the Chief of the SADF, bypassing normal channels of command. DST made extensive use of Special Forces in their destabilisation of Southern African countries, in particular in providing training and support to surrogate forces. All sensitive Special Forces operations were vetted by the Minister of Defence and in the case of particularly sensitive operations, by the State President.)	To	Ribbon
1974	Maj -Gen FW Loots SSA,SD,SM	1982	Star of South Africa SSA Southern Cross Decoration SD Southern Cross Medal SM
1982	Maj -Gen AJ Liebenberg SSAS,SD,SOE,SM,MMM (Note: Later General and Chief of the SADF)	1985	Star of South Africa SSAS Southern Cross Decoration SD South African Police Star for Outstanding Service SOE Southern Cross Medal SM Military Merit Medal MMM
1985	Maj -Gen AJM Joubert	1989	
1989	Maj -Gen Eddie Webb	1991	

1 Reconnaissance Regiment Leadership (Note: 1RR was based in Durban and consisted of a training component and an operational wing which provided personnel for cross-border raids such as those on Matola and Maseru. In the 1980s it was a predominantly black unit with white senior officers and with a strength of approximately 1 000.)
From	Officers Commanding	To	Ribbon
01 Oct 1972	Cmdt JG ‘Jannie’ Breytenbach DVR,SD,SM,MMM (Note: Later Colonel)	31 Dec 1974	Van Riebeeck Decoration DVR Southern Cross Decoration SD Southern Cross Medal SM Military Merit Medal MMM
13 Jan 1975	Maj JC Swart (Note: Temporary Commandant)	31 Dec 1980	
01 Jan 1981	Col E Olckers	30 Mar 1983	
31 Mar 1983	Col A Bestbier	31 Dec 1988	
01 Jan 1988	Col G Keulder	24 Nov 1993	
01 Jan 1994	Col A Diedericks HCS,HC,SM,MMM	31 Dec 1994	Honoris Crux Silver HCS Honoris Crux (1975) HC Southern Cross Medal SM Military Merit Medal MMM
	Col FE Fourie	26 Jan 1996	

2 Reconnaissance Regiment Leadership (Note: 2RR was a Citizen Force unit for ex-Recce members, available for emergency deployment on a Citizen Force basis. Its total strength was 2-3 000 but its operational strength only a few hundred.)
From	Officers Commanding	To	Ribbon
1974	Maj DS van der Spuy	1992	

3 Reconnaissance Regiment Leadership (Note: 3RR was established in 1980 to absorb members of the Rhodesian Special Forces. Its name was later changed to Delta 40 and then Barnacle. It operated as the covert arm of Special Forces. It underwent another name change in 1986 with the formation of the CCB.)
From	Officers Commanding	To	Ribbon
1980	Garth Barrett	1983	
