= 44 Parachute Regiment (South Africa) =

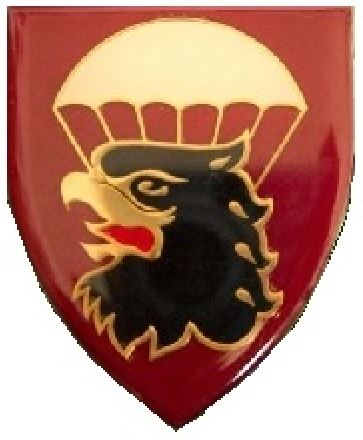
- 44 Parachute Regiment emblem
- Founded: 2000 (as regiment)
- Country: South Africa
- Branch: South African Army
- Type: Airborne Force
- Role: Light infantry Airborne force Special Forces support Rapid response Counter-insurgency
- Size: 3 Battalions
- Garrison/HQ: Tempe, Bloemfontein
- Nickname: Parabats
- Beret Colour: Maroon
- Engagements: South African Border War; Operation Reindeer; Battle of Cassinga; Southern African Development Community intervention in Lesotho; Operation Boleas; South African military assistance to the Central African Republic; United Nations Force Intervention Brigade

Commanders
- Notable commanders: Commandant Willem Louw

44 Parachute Regiment is the South African Army's chief airborne infantry unit. It was created in 2000 by redesignating 44 Parachute Brigade, and is based at the Tempe military base near Bloemfontein.

== History ==
=== Origin ===
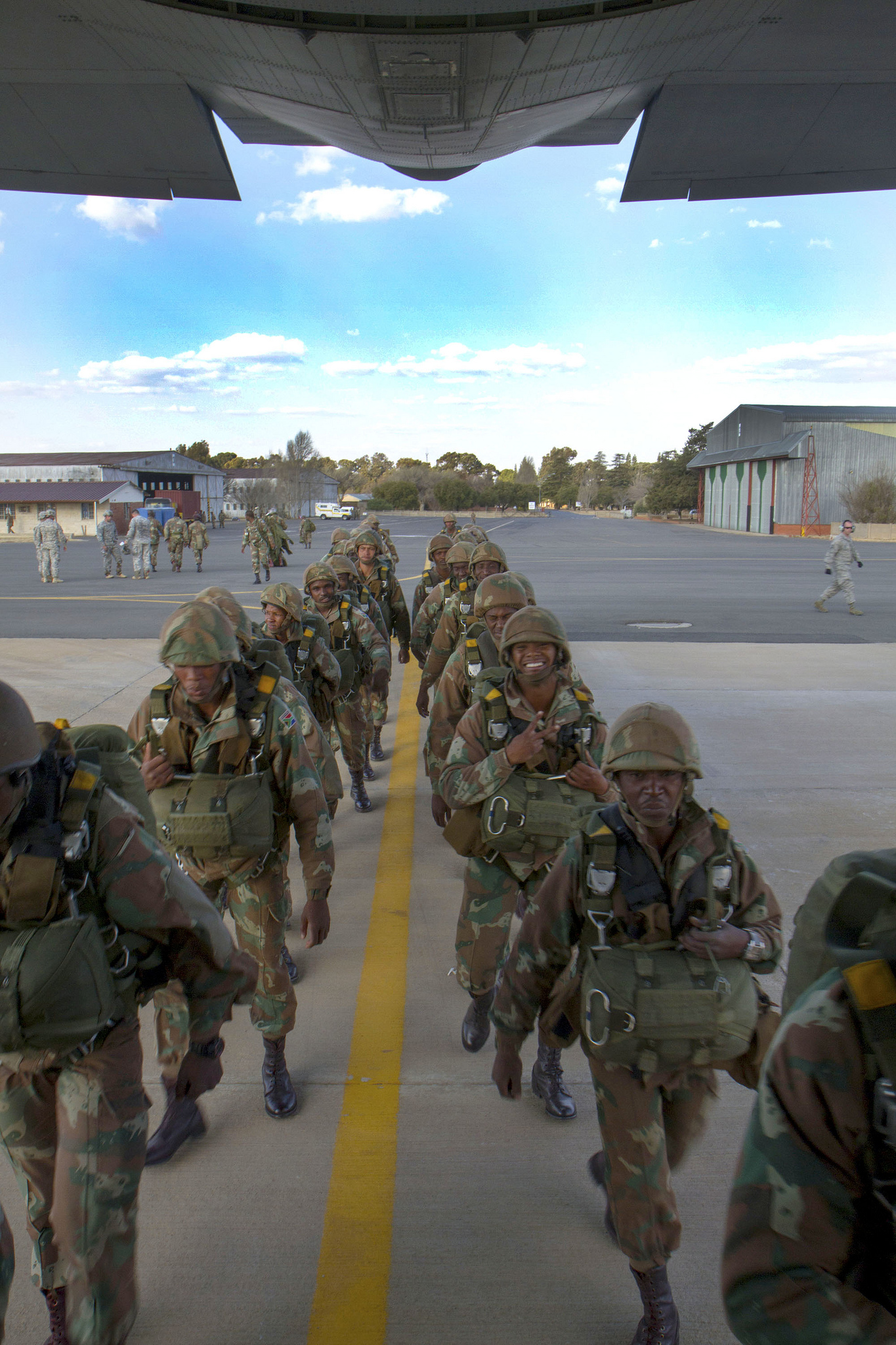
South African paratroops from 44 Parachute Regiment board a C-130 Hercules aircraft

The first South African airborne unit was formed in August 1943, when a Parachute Platoon of the South African Air Force was established. However, this unit was disbanded before training could be completed.

There were no further attempts to establish any airborne units until 1961, when selected members of the South African Army received parachute training at RAF Abingdon. This was followed by the establishment of 1 Parachute Battalion under Commandant Willem Louw on 1 April 1961.

=== The Border War ===
On 26 August 1966, units of 1 Parachute Battalion (called Parabats) first participated in operations as part of the South African Border War in South-West Africa (now Namibia). This involvement was eventually to last for more than twenty years.

In April 1978 44 Parachute Brigade was established, with the addition of 2 and 3 Parachute Battalions.

On 4 May 1978 South Africa's first major airborne operation (Operation Reindeer) took place. A large group of paratroopers, from 1,2 and 3 Battalions, attacked a large SWAPO base in Angola, successfully capturing it. (See Battle of Cassinga).

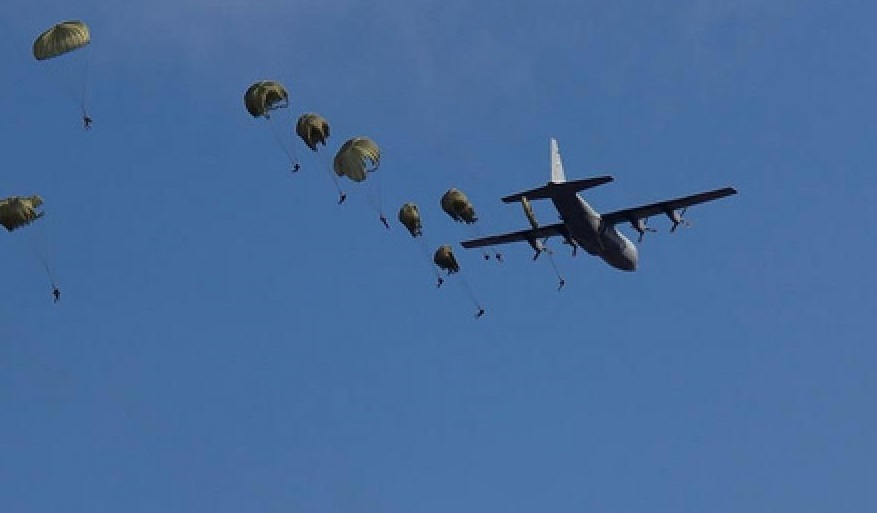
Static line para jump from Hercules aircraft 1998

Following the end of the Border War in 1989, the Brigade was scaled down slightly and began preparing for a new role, that of conducting operations internally in South Africa in order to quell increasing levels of violence between various political groups.

In January 1991 the Brigade conducted its first operational jump in an urban counterinsurgency role when 2 Parachute Battalion deployed to Natal as part of Operation Eardrum to quell the violence. The Brigade took part in many similar operations in the following years, helping to minimise the violence sufficiently to allow South Africa's first democratic elections to go ahead in April 1994.

=== Post 1994 ===
The Brigade's first operational deployment in the post-1994 period was Operation Boleas in September 1998. It deployed two parachute companies and the Pathfinder Platoon to Lesotho to prevent a coup d'état.

During 1998, the decision was taken to redesignate the unit as a multi-battalion regiment, but it was only during the year 2000 that this change became official.

=== Peacekeeping in Africa ===
In 2001 regiment personnel formed the spearhead of the South African Protection Support Detachment deploying to Burundi.

In 2012, the regiments' 1st Battalion participated in the South African military assistance to the Central African Republic operation, where the unit suffered 13 killed, with 27 injured and one missing in action in an ambush conducted by Séléka rebels. The Battle of Bangui was, however, considered a success for the Parabats as they killed more than 3000 Seleka rebels.

In 2014 the Regiment contributed one company to the United Nations Force Intervention Brigade which fought a number of engagements in the DRC.

== Structure ==
As of 2004, the Regiment consists of the following units:

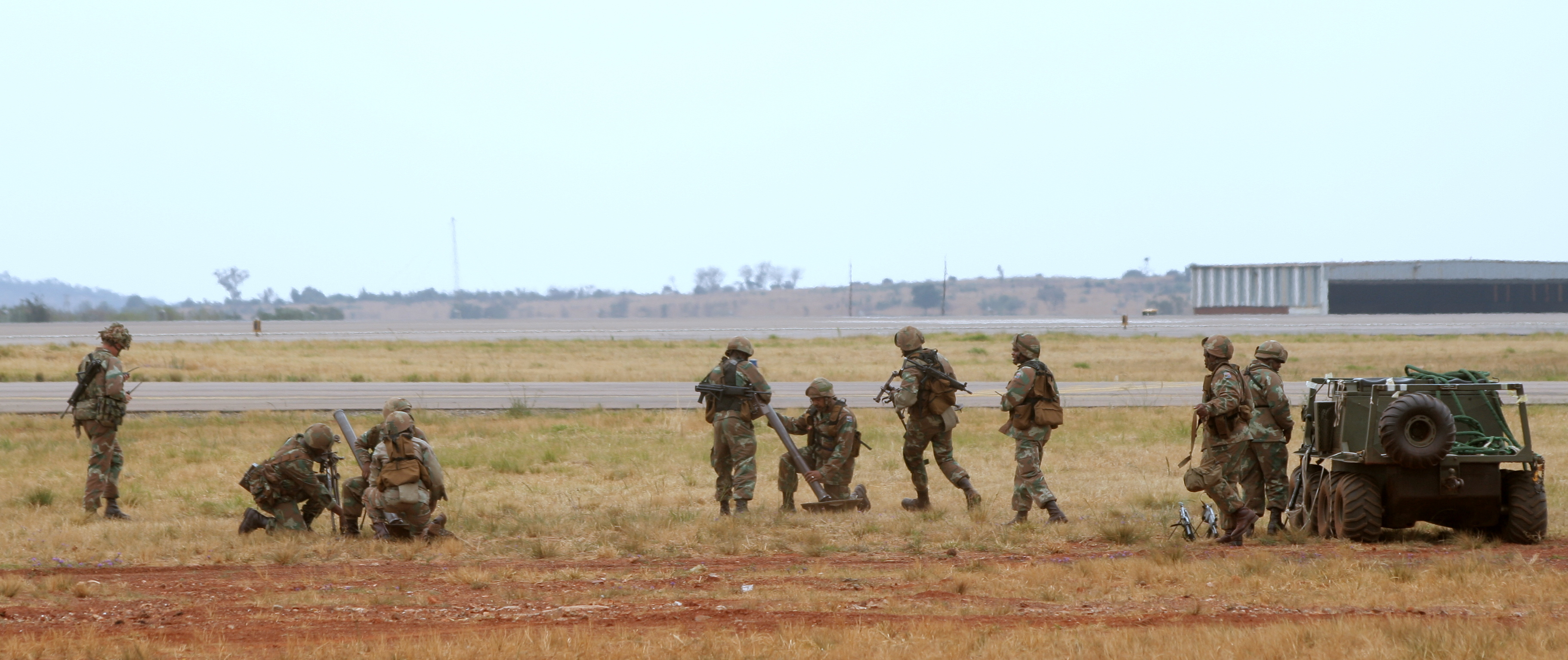
SANDF Airborne soldiers equipped with a Gecko 8x8 ATV deploying mortars during a mock combat demonstration at AFB Waterkloof in October 2011

- 44 Parachute Regiment Headquarters and Regimental Staff
- 1 Parachute Battalion (Regular Force)
- 2 Parachute Battalion (Reserve Force)
- 3 Parachute Battalion (Reserve Force)
- 44 Pathfinder Platoon
- 13 Signal Squadron
- 44 Medical Task Group (Detachment of 7 Medical Battalion Group, SAMHS)
- Parachute Training Wing (South Africa)
- Parachute Packing Wing
- 101 Air Supply Unit SAOSC (Lyttelton, Gauteng)

== Leadership ==
Leadership
From	Honorary Colonel	To	Ribbon
	No known incumbents		
From	Officer Commanding	To	Ribbon
	No known incumbents		
From	Regimental Sergeants Major	To	Ribbon
	No known incumbents		

== Insignia ==
=== Previous Dress Insignia ===
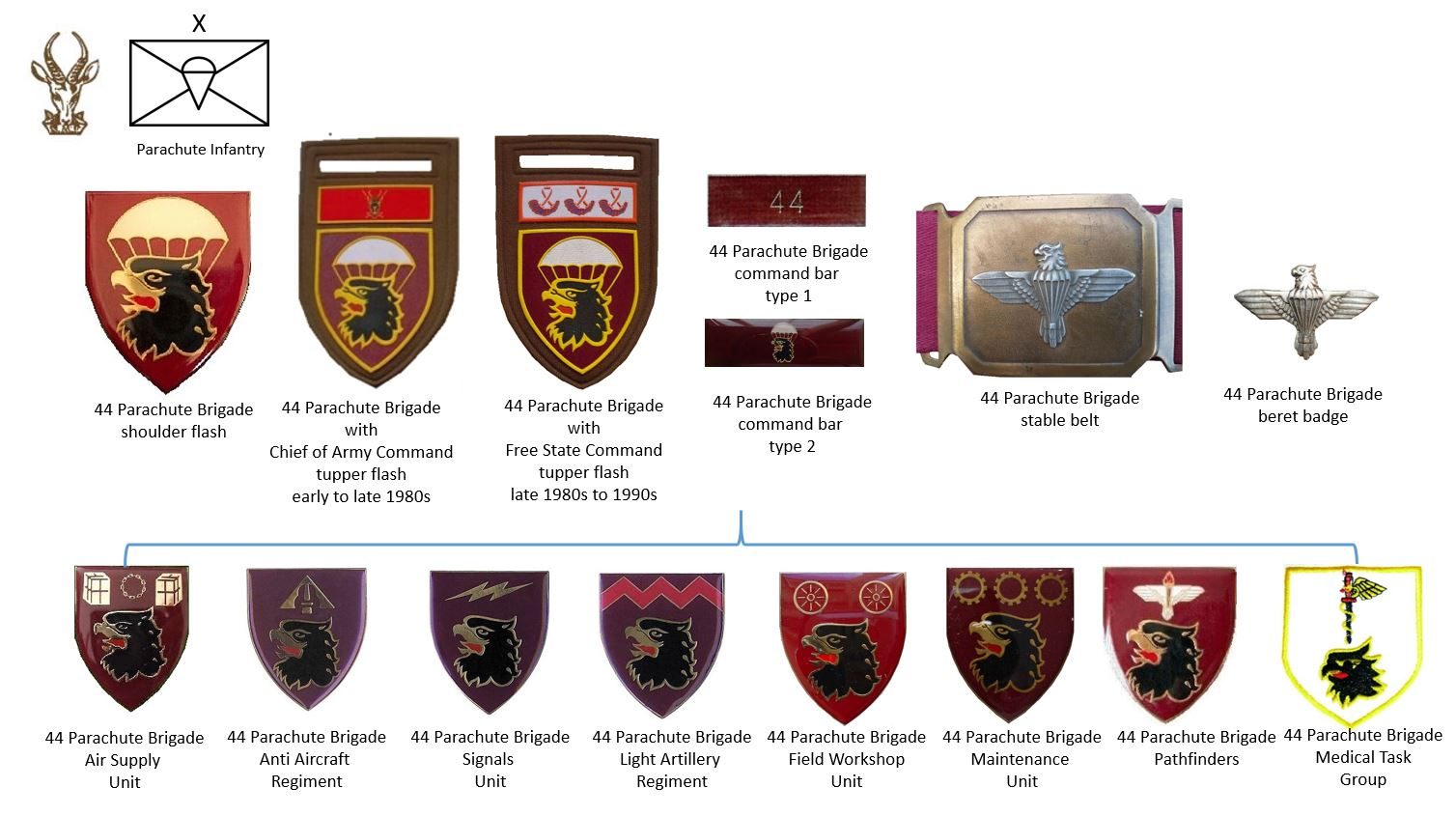
SADF era 44 Para Brigade insignia
