= 5 Reconnaissance Commando (South Africa) =

- Active: 5 December 1976
- Disbanded: 1 January 1981
- Country: South Africa
- Allegiance: Republic of South Africa
- Branch: South African Army
- Type: Special forces
- Part of: South African Defence Force
- Garrison/HQ: Durban; Dukuduku; Schiettocht, Phalaborwa
- Motto: We Fear Naught But God

The 5 Reconnaissance Commando was a South African special forces unit of the South African Defence Force, established in 1976 to give the SADF a pseudo-operations capability modelled on that of the Rhodesian Selous Scouts. It also carried out special reconnaissance and small-team operations. In January 1981 it amalgamated with 3 Reconnaissance Commando to form 5 Reconnaissance Regiment, which is now 5 Special Forces Regiment.

== History ==
By the mid-1970s the General Officer Commanding of the South African Special Forces, Major General Frederich Wilhelm ("Fritz") Loots, had identified a need for a unit comparable to the Selous Scouts, the Rhodesian special forces unit that specialised in pseudo-operations. Liaison followed between Loots, the Selous Scouts commander Ron Reid-Daly and the Rhodesian commander Walls. South African interest centred on pseudo-operations, small-team reconnaissance and the use of armed vehicles.

A group of South African operators attended the Selous Scouts "Dark Phase" course in Rhodesia. On their return they were told by the Officer Commanding of 1 Reconnaissance Commando, Commandant Swart, that they would form the nucleus of the new unit. 5 Reconnaissance Commando was established in Durban on 5 December 1976. The unit was racially mixed; by mid-1977 it consisted of 15 white and 22 black operators.

In January 1979 the unit moved from Durban to Dukuduku in northern Natal, midway between Mtubatuba and Lake St Lucia. Dukuduku had been the site of the Reconnaissance Commando School since May 1976, and it remained in use as a Special Forces selection and cycle training area after the unit left. In 1980 the unit moved from Dukuduku to Schiettocht, a base outside Phalaborwa in the Transvaal. The facilities at Dukuduku were insufficient to accommodate the unit, and former Selous Scouts who had left Zimbabwe at independence had by then been absorbed into 3 Reconnaissance Commando, also at Phalaborwa.

On 1 January 1981 the South African Special Forces were reorganised as an independent formation reporting directly to the Chief of the SADF, and its constituent units were given regimental status. 5 Reconnaissance Commando and 3 Reconnaissance Commando were amalgamated to form 5 Reconnaissance Regiment. By the time the amalgamation was complete, few of the white operators from 3 Recce remained. Some had declined to renew their contracts or had resigned, and others who had expected the Rhodesians to be retained as a separate entity followed Reid-Daly to Transkei, where they trained the Transkei Special Forces. Most of the black operators from 3 Recce remained with the amalgamated unit. The remaining white Rhodesian operators were placed in the newly formed 51 and 52 Commandos, and the black Rhodesian operators in 53 Commando, which was commanded by South African officers and NCOs. About 30 former Rhodesian Light Infantry NCOs also joined the unit at Phalaborwa as support personnel.

== Structure ==
As a commando the unit was small, and its structure is documented mainly from the regimental period that followed. On amalgamation in 1981 the regiment formed 51, 52 and 53 Commandos. The South African Special Forces Heritage Foundation, which numbers the sub-units differently, records five commandos:

- 5.1 Commando – operational (motto: Komesho Nonyanti)
- 5.2 Commando – operational (motto: Camels don't cry)
- 5.3 Commando – operational (motto: Pamberi ne Hondo)
- 5.4 Commando – operational, small teams
- 5.5 Commando – training

== Insignia ==
The South African Special Forces Heritage Foundation records that the unit emblem was authorised on 13 February 1982, and that the regimental colour was awarded on 5 December 1988 and presented at a parade at Schiettocht Base.

== Successor unit ==
5 Reconnaissance Regiment remained at Phalaborwa, where it specialised in overland operations, principally long-range infiltration, intelligence gathering and airborne operations. During the rationalisation, reorganisation and integration of the South African armed forces between 1992 and 1995 the regiment was renamed 451 Parachute Battalion, and was subsequently redesignated 5 Special Forces Regiment.

The Special Forces School was transferred to 5 Special Forces Regiment in 1997 on the retirement of 1 Special Forces Regiment, where it had previously been based, and was transferred out again in 2002 to become a stand-alone unit north of Pretoria. Since 2002 the regiment has consisted of two operational commandos and a training wing. The Heritage Foundation further records that members of the regiment took part in fighting at Bangui in the Central African Republic in March 2013, that several were decorated, and that the regiment was permitted to add the name of the battle to its regimental colour.

== See also ==
- South African Special Forces
- 1 Reconnaissance Commando (South Africa)
- 2 Reconnaissance Commando (South Africa)
- 3 Reconnaissance Commando (South Africa)
- 4 Reconnaissance Commando (South Africa)
- Selous Scouts
- Rhodesian Light Infantry
