= 44 Pathfinder Platoon =

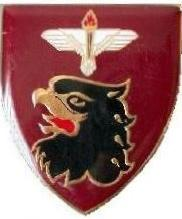
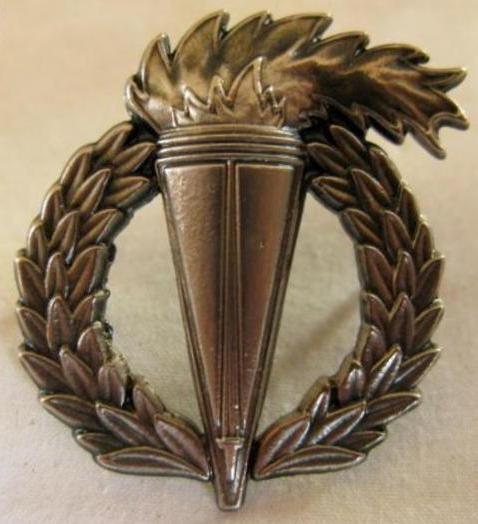
- 44 Pathfinder Platoon emblem and beret badge
- Founded: January 1978; 48 years ago
- Country: South Africa
- Branch: South African Army
- Type: Pathfinder
- Role: Pathfinder; Counter terrorism Counterinsurgency; Airborne operations Special operations Special Reconnaissance; Forward observer Foreign Internal Defence
- Garrison/HQ: Tempe Military Base, Bloemfontein
- Nickname: Papa Victor
- Motto: Semper Primus

Commanders
- Notable commanders: SSgt Domingos Sgt Kassangilli (Ret)
- Headgear: Maroon Beret

The 44 Pathfinder Platoon is part of the 44 Parachute Regiment. The pathfinder is a trained and specialised operator who performs covertly behind enemy lines, either in small groups or in collaboration with other reconnaissance units.

== History of the Pathfinders in 44 Parachute Brigade ==
=== 44 Pathfinder Company 1980–1982 ===
In the early 1980s and following the creation of Zimbabwe a number of former Rhodesian Army soldiers joined the SADF on a short contract. Some were absorbed into 32 Battalion and others, mainly Rhodesian professional soldiers, were recruited by Col. Jan Breytenbach into 44 Parachute Brigade to serve as a new fighting arm within the brigade. These British, Rhodesian, and American Troops were at that time humorously referred to as 'The Philistines' because they were foreigners.

After their selection and induction, these recruits underwent further training in bush warfare and conventional pathfinding methods as a part of 2 pathfinder selection courses. This training by early 1981 produced sufficient personnel to be deployed on active service. Their envisaged role was to conduct mobile, fighting patrols deep inside Angola. They were highly trained in counter-terrorist operations and already self-sufficient and in most cases independent from the rest of the SADF.

They were based at Ondangwa, South-West Africa (now Namibia) and from there they would launch patrols into Angola mostly led by Colonel Breytenbach. This force in its short and controversial history proved to be highly successful and when Colonel Breytenbach left the Brigade in 1982 they were disbanded. Before its eventual disbandment the Pathfinders were involved to a degree in giving instruction to 44 Parachute Brigade's Citizen Force Paratroopers, however, on the completion of their one-year contracts some chose to leave the SADF whilst others which were the majority, were transferred to 32 Battalion.

=== 44 Pathfinder Platoon ===
In 1976, 1 Parachute Battalion possessed a limited pathfinder capability in a small group of permanent force members who were Drop Zone Safety Officers and Freefall qualified. These comprised the following: Capt. J.E. Rabie Lt. J.C. Van Wyk 2 Lt. M. Ellis 2 Lt. M.J. Boon Sgt M. P .J. Liebenberg Cpl. D.W. Van Zyl and Cpl. J.J. Grobler.

The Battalion had no other specialized training except that of paratrooper soldiering. With fixed posts within the Battalion, these members would only group as and when the situation required and then mainly for the purpose of training. With the success and lessons from Operation Reindeer in May 1978, it became clear that a method for ensuring correct and safe dropping, grouping, and extraction of paratroopers was urgently needed. In order to have the capability to covertly insert behind enemy lines, and do reconnaissance on the target, the Battalion would need to create a formal structure, command system, specialized equipment, and operational procedures to support this.

The then Commander of 1 Parachute Battalion, Col. D.J. Moore, requested Maj Joos Rabie to formulate staff, equipment tables and to establish guidelines for the formation of an extended Pathfinder capability within the unit. The blueprint used was a combination of the British SAS, USA Pathfinders, and the Reconnaissance Regiments (Recces) of the SADF. The objective was to train the Pathfinder to be on par with the Recces' in their training schedule regarding land warfare, but specializing in pathfinder and airborne operations. 2Lt. Jacobus. G. Hoon and 2Lt. Pierre Lundberg together with Cpl's I.J. Pretorius and Daniel. J. Schutte were the first Permanent force leader group who trained the first group of Pathfinders in September 1978.

=== Operations ===
==== Operational Duties (Ondjiva—Angola: January 1982 – August 1982) ====
The command of this group fell under Lt J.G.Hoon (1st Pathfinder Group 1978) and 2 Lt Paul Troll. Both Hoon and Troll were from 1 Para Bn. The Pathfinder group teamed up with 101 Battalion in May 1981 at Miershoop where Minor Tactics were introduced to the Recce Pl of 101 BN. South West African Territorial Force (SWATF) who mainly served as trackers, translators, backup firepower (60mm Mortars and LMGs) and the Pathfinder group acting as team leaders and medics. They operated in small (4 man) teams (2 Pathfinders and 2 101 Battalion Ovambos) looking for weapon caches and doing counter-insurgency operations for the upcoming expected rainy-season offensive. For their service, this group of Pathfinders was awarded the Chief of the SADF Commendation Medal.

After the initial deployment at 101, Capt Pierre Lundberg who was a member of the initial group was again asked to command the national service pathfinders, which he did until the end of 1982. He was also joined by Lt John Tawse and both served in this capacity until leaving at the end of Jan 1983 where each respectively joined 4 Recce in Langebaan and 31 Battalion Recce at Omega, Caprivi on a permanent basis. After this departure, the Pathfinders had no Permanent Force leadership for almost 4 months until Capt John van Aswegen (Former Rhodesian SAS and 1 and 6 Recce) took over as the Pathfinder Commanding Officer.

All the subsequent Pathfinders groups followed a similar training schedule as the first three groups in regime and quality. In November 1983 John van Aswegen moved to 44 Parachute Brigade and became the new Commanding Officer of the newly formed 44 Parachute Brigade Pathfinder Company.

=== Pathfinder statistics ===
==== From 1978 until October 1989 and at the end of the bush war (Citizen Force Members) ====
98 members successfully completed the course during their National service, of which 62 members attended citizen call-up camps. A further 86 members did training camps or Brigade exercises and 67 members participated in operations in the SWA/Angola Operations Area. As of December 1989, the company strength stood at 86 members.

The Pathfinders were a relatively small group of soldiers. By comparison, the Reconnaissance Regiment from the formation of 1 Recce Commando at Oudtshoorn in 1972, to end of the Angolan/Bush war (1989) has over 450 qualified Recce operators; an average of 26 to 27 operators a year, while there were only 98 qualified Pathfinders from 1978 up to 1989, an average of 9 Pathfinders per year.

Pathfinders were also the only Special Forces troops in the SADF that mostly comprised national service members with only their officers being Permanent Force members. In comparison, the Recce Regiments and 32 Battalion members were required to join the Permanent Force (5 years) or at least in short-term duty (3 years).

==== Synopsis ====
The fact that the Pathfinders were National Servicemen worked in certain instances against them. The leader group in 1 Parachute Battalion and 44 Parachute Brigade (comprising mostly career soldiers), followed the age-old tradition of the British Army with their very strict rank and chain of command with limited understanding of Special Forces work.

Their application of the warfare doctrine "shock and awe" was in contrast to special operations which revolved around clandestine and reconnaissance operations. The small, close-knit elite unit function worked best when run in an egalitarian manner. The differentiator is that a strong chain of command existed well in such a unit however with no one working hard at wielding power.

In most instances, the Pathfinder with the most experience assumes command for that specific operation which sometimes superseded the command of a Colonels or Sergeant Majors. This being totally out of the norm of a regular army. In units like the Recce Commando's and 32 Battalion, the ethos of Special Forces was well understood and practiced by the leader group. In contrast, the Pathfinders were an isolated group in the Parachute Battalion, as their war doctrine and command ethos differed radically from that of the normal Paratrooper Companies. This situation was further exacerbated by the Commanders' lack of understanding of how to use specialist forces.

This led to amongst other, airborne battle-handling courses being presented at the newly formed 44 Parachute Regiment (Downgraded from Brigade to Regiment in 1999 following a transformation of the SADF to SANDF) The issue as described is discussed and dealt with and every junior officer in the airborne attends.

Most of the Citizen Force Pathfinders needed refresher courses where the latest battlefield lessons were imparted to them during these call-ups. The officers and many groups of Pathfinders were also trained by elements of the Recce Regiment and many of the battlefield experience the Recces acquired were also transferred to the Pathfinders. With the transformation and new dispensation in the National Defence Force, combat experience and lessons learned on the battlefield that was transferred from one Pathfinder group to the next, was unfortunately lost and many of the leader group have subsequently left the service.

=== Leadership ===
Leadership of 44 Pathfinder Platoon
From	Commanding Officers	To	Ribbon
1978	Maj Joos Rabie	1981	
1982	Capt Pierre Lundberg	1983	
1983	Capt John van Aswegen	1984	
1984	Lt Andre Botha	1985	
1984	Lt Gunter von Martelock (Note: 2IC)	1985	
