= Krupert Nel =

Army Officer

Brigadier General Krubert Eric Nel SD, SM, MMM
- Died: Alive
- Military career
- Allegiance: South Africa
- Branch: South African Army and Special Forces
- Service years: January 1978–31 March 2012
- Rank: Brigadier General
- Units: School of Engineers, Kroonstad
- Commands: OC 4 Special Forces Regiment; CoS Special Forces Bde; GOC Special Forces Bde; CoS Infantry Fmn
- Awards: Southern Cross Decoration SD Southern Cross Medal SM Military Merit Medal MMM Pro Patria Medal Southern Africa Medal General Service Medal (South Africa) Unitas (Unity) Medal Good Service Medal

Brigadier General Krubert Eric Nel SD SM MMM is a retired South African Army officer who also served in the South African Special Forces.

== Military career ==
Brig Gen Nel joined the South African Defence Force at the School of Engineers in January 1978 as a National Serviceman, where he later became an officer. In 1980 he completed the Special Forces Cycle Training and was transferred to 4 Reconnaissance Regiment in Langebaan. In May 1985 he participated in the ill-fated incursion into Cabinda - Operation Argon - that resulted in two Special Forces operators being killed in action and a third being captured by MPLA forces.

From 3 January 1994 to 13 March 1998 he was the Officer Commanding of 4 Special Forces Regiment and then served as the Chief of Staff of the South African Special Forces Brigade from 1 March 1998 until 31 December 2002, becoming the General Officer Commanding on 1 January 2003.

In January 2006 he was appointed as the Chief of Staff of the South African Army Infantry Formation.

Brig Nel took early retirement from the SANDF on 31 March 2012.

== Awards and decorations ==
=== Medals ===
Gen Nel has been awarded the following medals:

- Southern Cross Decoration (SD)
- Southern Cross Medal (1975) (SM)
- Military Merit Medal (MMM)
- Pro Patria Medal
- Southern Africa Medal
- General Service Medal (South Africa)
- Unitas (Unity) Medal
- Good Service Medal (Gold (30 Years))
- Good Service Medal (Silver (20 Years))
- Good Service Medal (Bronze (10 Years))

=== Proficiency and Qualification badges ===
Gen Nel qualified for the following:

SA Special Forces Operator's Badge (Qualification) Black on Thatch beige, Embossed. Dagger enclosed with a laurel wreath	Attack Diver (Qualification) Bronze. Black on Thatch beige, Embossed. The badge depicts a great white shark swimming past the Neptune trident, which is mounted on the mouthpiece of an Oxygears 57 and is enclosed within the tubes of the Oxygears 57	Free Fall Paratrooper (Qualification) Advanced, Freefall. Black on Thatch beige. Small Black wings

Military offices
Preceded by Brig Gen Clive P van Schalkwyk	Chief of Staff SA Army Infantry Fmn; 2006–2012	Succeeded by Brig Gen Xolani Mankayi
Preceded by Brig Gen Les Rudman	GOC Special Forces Brigade; 2003–2006	Succeeded by Brig Gen Rudzani Maphwanya
Preceded by Col Roelof du Plooy	Chief of Staff Special Forces Brigade; 1998–2003	Succeeded by Col Doibie Coetzee
Preceded by Col Hannes Venter	OC 4 Special Forces Regiment; 1994–1998	Succeeded by Col Julius Engelbrecht
