= 101 Air Supply Unit SAOSC =

101 Air Supply Unit
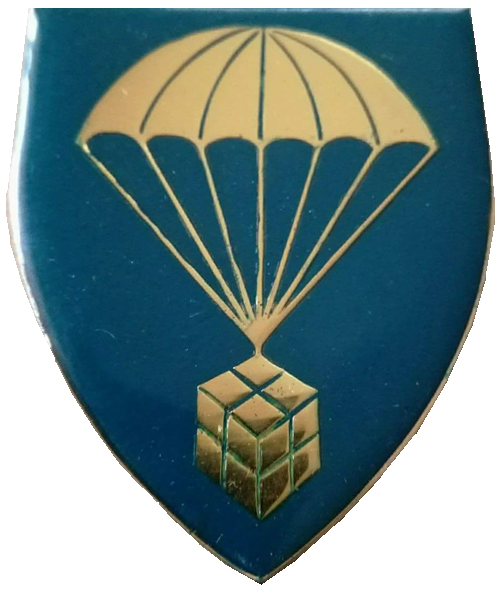
- 101 Air Supply emblem
- Active: October 1963 – present
- Country: South Africa
- Branch: South African Army
- Type: Air supply
- Part of: South African Ordnance Service Corps
- Garrison/HQ: Lyttelton, Gauteng

The 101 Air Supply Unit is a parachute unit of the South African Ordnance Services Corps. Formed in 1963, it has supported the 44 Parachute Brigade, now the 44 Parachute Regiment, since its establishment. It appears to be based at Lyttelton, Gauteng. Engelbrecht, Leon (2 March 2010). "Fact file: 44 Parachute Regiment | defenceWeb". defenceweb.co.za. Archived from the original on 2015-06-18.

The primary role of the Ordnance Services Corps is

the effective acquisition, receipt, storing, safekeeping, preservation, maintenance, accounting, distribution and disposal of clothing, accommodation, ammunition, vehicles, fuel and spares within the army.

The OSC also delivers specialised services to the army, which includes computer services, air supply and nature conservation. Engelbrecht, Leon (2006). A guide to the SANDF - unpublished manuscript. Johannesburg.

== History ==
In the summer of 1962, three candidates were drafted as part of a plan that eventually determined air supply capability in the SADF. The three were Tom Moodie, P.A. Goosen, and C. van Heerden. They reported for national service on 3 January 1963, as members of the 101 Air Supply Platoon (101 ASP) of the Active Citizen Force. Morkel, Cmdt Herman. History of 101 Air Supply.

The three draftees were assigned to the then ADK Afrikaans: Special Service Corps. Tom Moodie was selected to attend a candidate officer's course which began in April, at the Military Services School, and was commissioned as an assistant field cornet (AFC) (2nd lieutenant) on his successful completion of that course. He served as quartermaster at 16 K&T Company for the last three months of his training.

P.A. Goosen and C. van Heerden became NCOs of the 101 Air Supply Platoon and served out their national service as corporals in the same company, the 16 K&T, located at the Technical Service's Base at Lyttelton, Pretoria. Also in April 1963, a fourth member, serviceman L. Knobel, was drafted to the same unit.

National service drafts at that time occurred every three months; in the July intake three members were added to the unit and another two in September. The next year twelve members were added, so that by the end of 1964 the unit's strength stood at 21 members.

Towards the middle of 1967 the first draft of recruits for 102 Air Supply Platoon began.

=== Establishing 101 Air Supply Platoon ===
On 23 October 1963, Captain Jan Klopper sent AFC Moodie to Northern Transvaal Command, where he was informed by Cmdt. C. Spiller that a permanent commissioned post had been created by the SADF for his position, and that it had been awarded to him. (At that time a commission was temporary, ending with the nine-month national service period).

At this meeting AFC Moodie was informed that he was being appointed acting officer in command of 101 ASP; three personnel staff files were handed to him, his own and those of corporals Van Heerden and Goosen.

On his appointment, AFC Moodie was 19 years old, making him one of the youngest commanders in the history of the SADF at that time. On 23 April 1964, his appointment was made permanent, and he continued to hold it for 29 years until 1993, making him one of the longest incumbent unit OCs in the SADF.

In December 1964, the first unit camp was held at Diensvakskool Afrikaans: service subject school with 16 members from 101 ASP.

Other permanent force personnel, skilled to a degree in air supply training, were Cmdt. Rasie van Vuuren, WO1 H Fresco, Lt. T Greef, Cmdt. Jackel, Sgt. J Grobler and Cmdt. V Hatting.

Initially training took place under the auspices of the "Corps – School Services", and later "KDK School". After 44 Parachute Brigade relocated from Bloemfontein to Pretoria, training was undertaken on a more intensive basis by the air supply wing of the brigade.

Practical air supply in the SADF has been ongoing for over 28 years, from the full spectrum of training, methods and methodology used in the Second World War (ejection platform, SEAK-pack on C47) to the most modern LHPLUS system applied on the C130.

Until the beginning of Operation Savannah, in 1975, the unit had participated in scheduled training camps where members were called up and trained over fixed periods. The last time the unit was called up with all members being present was the first 21 days of February 1975. Up until this period the unit had concluded 10 camps. Since February 1975, the unit has been deployed in a full-time operational capacity and training and training camps have taken place only on an ad hoc basis where certain elements of the unit were involved.

=== Operational utilization ===
The unit became operational beginning with Operation Savannah in November 1975. Initially, members were stationed at Air Force Base Waterkloof and AF bases for three-month periods to load and off-load C130s and C160s.

From the early 1980s, the emphasis shifted towards more technically valuable contributions to combat situations, such as the technique of tying heavy wooden platforms with steel cables and using modern pallets and the "LAPES" (low altitude platform extraction systems), which are still used. With a reduction in military operations, the unit was placed on an ad hoc basis, with activation for military exercises.

The 101 ASP is an important link in the supply chain to provision fighting units in the field and works closely with maintenance units. While neither a conventional supply and replenishment unit nor a typical maintenance unit, it does provide supplies and equipment by air transport on short notice.

== Participated in ==
=== Operations ===
- Operation Savannah (Angola) 1975
- Operation Bowler 1979–1980
- Operation Askari 1983–1984
- Operation Moduler 1987
- Hooper 1987
- Packer 1988
- Merlyn 1989
- UNIVAM III 1995 (via air supply, equipment to Angola)

=== Exercises ===
- Thunder Chariot (c. 1983)
- Marion Island (post and fresh vegetables to

Department of Environmental Affairs)

- Iron Eagle I, II and III
- Sweepslag
- Strandloper
- Vlakwater
- Sombre
- Suiderkruis

== Establishment of 101 Air Supply Company ==
By 1970 the 101 Air Supply Platoon had participated in six training camps while the 102 Air Supply Platoon from its inception in June 1967, had not, due to a decision to first bring the 101 to full strength.

At that time the 101 was stationed in Pretoria whilst 102 was at Port Elizabeth. The commander of 102 Air Supply Platoon was Lt. J. Morris.

During 1971, a joint training camp attended by both platoons took place at Lenz Military Base in Johannesburg, AFC Moodie assumed command on this occasion. In May 1972, the 101 and 102 ASP platoons were amalgamated as the 101 Air Supply Company with AFC Moodie commanding. As of this writing it retains this format, though a submission was made to elevate its status to the 101 Air Supply Unit; the matter is pending.

=== Subordination ===
Since the inception of the unit in 1963, the unit has been under the command of various headquarters:

- Oct 1963 – Jan 1974: Northern Transvaal Command
- Feb 1974 – Jul 1978: 1 South African Corps
- Aug 1978 – Mar 1979: 44 Parachute Brigade
- Apr 1979 – Sep 1983: Army Headquarters
- Oct 1983 – Jan 1988: South African Army Logistics Command
- Feb 1988 – Nov 1996: 44 Parachute Brigade
- Dec 1996 – Apr 2008: South African Army Logistics Command
- Apr 2008 – date: 44 Parachute Brigade

=== Training ===
The unit was established with the aim of strengthening the conventional capability of the SADF. The unit is divided into four air supply platoons and one transport platoon with main responsibility and ability being air transport. Unit camps were mainly to train members of the unit in both air supply and air transport.

Since 1964, WO1 Ben Viljoen has been the instructor and has established, offered, and coordinated training and practice. However, no one from the permanent force side showed interest, read and researched to the degree that WO1 Ben Viljoen did.

The enthusiasm in air supply demonstrated by WO1 Ben Viljoen continued under the encouragement of Brig A. Botes at HQ–level, supporting the unit's distribution within the SADF.

Of all the air supply personnel in South Africa, 95% at some stage underwent training at the hands of WO1 Ben Viljoen and WO1 Hans Fresco.

== Insignia ==
=== Previous Dress Insignia ===
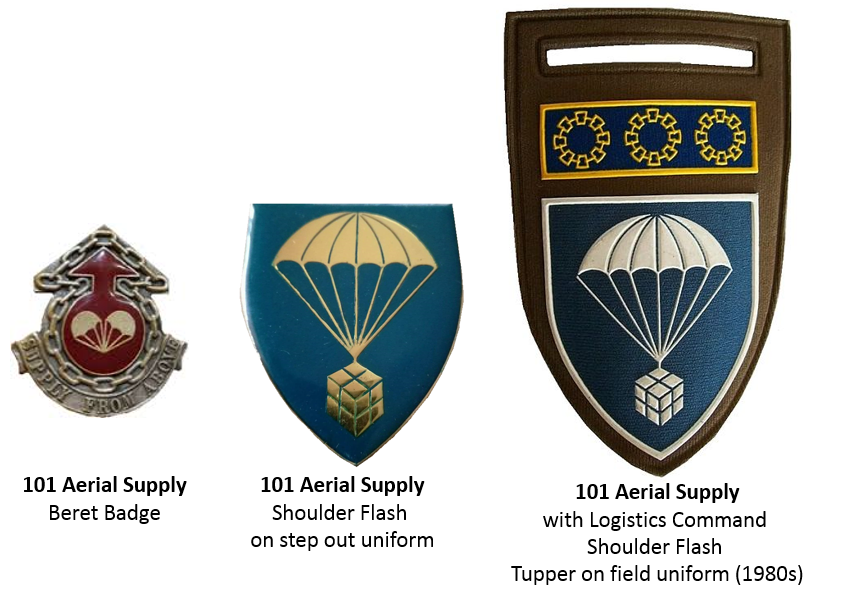
SADF era 101 Aerial Supply insignia

=== Current Dress Insignia ===
Proficiency badges
Air Supply (Qualification) Half Wing. Black on Thatch beige, Embossed. Half wing	Air Supply Instructor (Qualification) Full Wing. Black on Thatch beige, Embossed. Full Wing
Air Supply (Qualification) Half Wing. Chrome and enamel. Half wing with parachute on blue background	Air Supply Instructor (Qualification) Full Wing. Chrome and enamel. Complete wing with parachute on red background

== Leadership ==
101 Air Supply Leadership
From	Commanding Officers	To	Ribbon
1963	AFC Tom Moodie	1993	
1987	Cmdt B. van Vuuren	1988	
1988	Cmdt J. Jackel	1990	
1990	Cmdt J.V. Hattingh	1991	
1991	Cmdt C. Grové	1993	
1993	Cmdt F. Toerrien	1995	
1995	Cmdt J Loyd	2000	
2000	Lt Col K K Mancotywa	2007	
2007	Lt Col D D Mziki	2009	
2009	Lt Col B H Morkel	2015	
2015	Lt Col D.H. Tladi	present	
From	Regimental Sergeants Major	To	Ribbon
1991	WO1 Schutte	1993	
1993	WO1 Heilberg	1995	
1995	WO1 J Teitge	2000	
2000	MWO M Z Mdolo	present	
