= South African Special Forces Supply Unit =

Special Forces Supply Unit
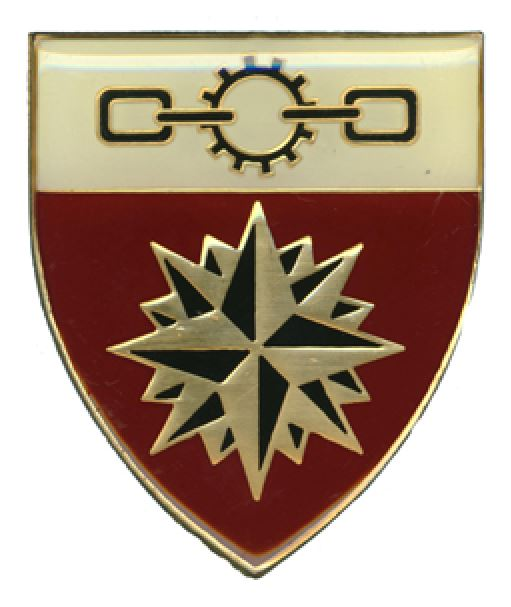
- Country: South Africa
- Allegiance: Republic of South Africa Republic of South Africa
- Branch: South African Army (until 1981) South African National Defence Force (since 1981)
- Type: Special forces
- Role: Logistics
- Part of: South African Special Forces
- Garrison/HQ: Pretoria
- Motto(s): Inter Primus

The Special Forces Supply Unit's role is to oversee and maintain all logistical, technical and other equipment for Special Forces. This includes all equipment and material unique to Special Forces.

== History ==
In order to be able to maintain and store the parachute equipment according to regulations, the Special Forces Supply Depot also has a modern parachute packing, store and maintenance facility.

In 1991, during the rationalisation and re-organisation within the Defence Force, the Special Forces Supply Depot was renamed 1 Maintenance Unit.

When Special Forces Headquarters moved temporarily from Speskop to Defence Headquarters in 1992, 1 Maintenance Unit was relocated to Wallmanstal, north of Pretoria.
