= 3 Reconnaissance Commando (South Africa) =

- Active: May 1976–1980
- Disbanded: 1980
- Country: South Africa
- Allegiance: Republic of South Africa
- Branch: South African Army
- Type: Special forces
- Role: Reconnaissance
- Part of: South African Defence Force

The 3 Reconnaissance Commando was a South African special forces unit.

== History ==
It was established on 1 May 1976 as an administrative umbrella for various small team operations such as Delta 40 and Barnacle which were the fore-runners of the Civil Co-operation Bureau (CCB). It operated as the covert arm of Special Forces.

In April 1980, a new unit called 7 Reconnaissance Commando was formed. This unit was created to accommodate the Rhodesian soldiers who did not wish to remain in Rhodesia after majority rule. These were primarily Selous Scouts with a smattering of soldiers from other units. 120 of these soldiers and their families were housed on a new base created on the farm Schiettocht, outside Phalaborwa. They formed the nucleus of the new unit.

The name of the unit was changed from 7 to 3 Reconnaissance Commando to avoid confusion with 7 South African Infantry Battalion (7 SAI) which was also located in Phalaborwa. The Truth and Reconciliation Commission does not seem to have picked up on this distinction, getting the two units confused.

In December 1980, 5 Reconnaissance Commando moved from Dukuduku to Schiettocht and on 1 January 1981, joined forces with 3 Reconnaissance Commando to form 5 Reconnaissance Regiment.

== Leadership ==
3 Reconnaissance Commando/Regiment (Note: There is some confusion here as Els reports the Amalgamation of 3 and 5 Recce, with 3 Recce commander being Capt Atkinson in 1980. The TRC reports Garth Barrett as the first commanding officer.)
From	Commanding Officers	To	Ribbon
1980	Capt J. Atkinson	1981	
1981	Lt. Col Garth Barrett (Note: Ex Rhodesian)	1983	
