= Chris Le Roux =

South African Army officer (1942–2021)

Major General Christoffel Erasmus le Roux SD SM MMM
- Born: 20 April 1946; Dundee, Natal
- Spouse: Marlyna le Roux
- Military career
- Allegiance: South Africa
- Branch: South African Army
- Service years: 1964–2000
- Rank: Brigadier
- Nickname: Chris
- Unit: 1 Parachute Battalion
- Commands: GOC RJTF East; GOC Natal Command; OC 1 Parachute Battalion
- Conflicts: South African Border War
- Awards: Southern Cross Decoration SD Southern Cross Medal SM Military Merit Medal MMM Pro Patria Medal (South Africa) Southern Africa Medal General Service Medal (South Africa) Unitas (Unity) Medal Good Service Medal

Maj Gen Chris le Roux SD SM MMM is a retired General Officer from the South African Army. He was born in Dundee and matriculated from Pinetown Boys' High School in 1963.

== Military career ==
He joined the South African Defence Force in 1964 and completed infantry training. He was a student at the South African Military Academy from 1965 and graduated with a Bachelor of Military Science degree awarded by the University of Stellenbosch in 1967.

He was commissioned as a lieutenant on 21 November 1967 and qualified as a static line paratrooper on 9 October 1970. Officer Commanding 1 Parachute Battalion during 1984 to 1988. Brigadier le Roux served as Officer Commanding Natal Command from 18 February 1995. He was promoted to rank of major general on 1 January 1996 and remained GOC Natal Command until 31 March 2000, the last person to hold that post. GOC Regional Joint Task Force on 1 April to 31 December 2000. He went on early retirement on 31 December 2000. He has remained actively involved in speaking about the military.

Maj Gen Chris le Roux completed more than 300 parachute jumps and was a qualified Freefall Instructor.

== Honours and awards ==
Freefall Instructor (Qualification)
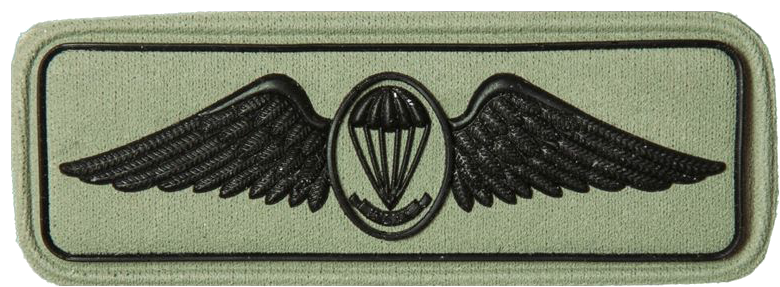
Instructor, Freefall Qualified. Black on Thatch beige, Embossed. Large Black wings

=== Medals ===
- Southern Cross Decoration (SD)
- Southern Cross Medal (1975) (SM)
- Military Merit Medal (MMM)
- Pro Patria Medal (South Africa) (with Cunene Clasp) (Note: Only the Cunene clasp was awarded, to members who served in Angola during Operation Savannah in 1975 and 1976. Recipients of the clasp wear a button, with the letter C encircled by a wreath, on the ribbon bar.)
- Southern Africa Medal
- General Service Medal (South Africa)
- Unitas (Unity) Medal
- Good Service Medal (Gold (30 Years))
- Good Service Medal (Silver (20 Years))
- Good Service Medal (Bronze (10 Years))

== Notes ==
Military offices
Preceded by New	GOC Regional Joint Task Force East; 2000– 2000	Succeeded by Mbulelo Tshiki
Preceded by Deon Ferreira	GOC Natal Command; 1995–2000	Succeeded by Closed down
Preceded by Anton van Graan	OC 1 Parachute Battalion; 1984–1988	Succeeded by James Hills
