= Renier Coetzee =

South African Army general

Brigadier General Renier Johannes Coetzee SM PS MMM
- Born: 1961 (age 64–65)
- Military career
- Allegiance: South Africa
- Branch: South African Army
- Service years: –2021
- Rank: Brigadier General
- Nicknames: Doibi, CoJack
- Unit: 5 Special Forces Regiment
- Commands: 1 Parachute Battalion; 5 Special Forces Regiment; Chief of Staff Special Forces Brigade; GOC SA Army Training Formation
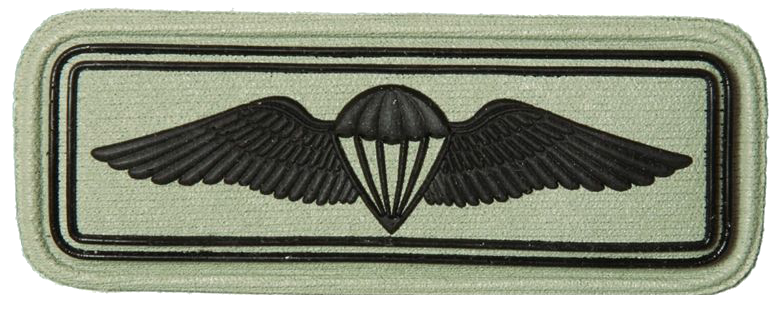
- Awards: SA Special Forces Operator's Badge Free Fall Paratrooper

Brigadier-General Renier (Cojack) Coetzee SM PS MMM was a General Officer in the South African Army from the recces.

== Military career ==
Gen. Coetzee served in 32 Battalion and then in the South African Special Forces, for a long time as the Chief of Staff of the South African Special Forces Brigade. He commanded 5 Special Forces Regiment (formerly 5 Reconnaissance Regiment) from 1998 to 2003, and served in the Mavinga area during Operations Moduler, Packer and Hooper. From mid-1987 to mid-1988, he was stationed at divisional headquarters, north-west of Mavinga in Angola. He was promoted to Brigadier General in 2014 and was appointed as Director Doctrine and Policy.

Col. Coetzee was embroiled in a controversy about the use of body armour (bullet proof vests) by SANDF soldiers in the Central African Republic during the Battle of Bangui. He has spoken as an expert on the utilisation of the SANDF Special Forces as a force multiplier in the SADC region. GOC SA Army Training Formation until his retirement.

== Awards and decorations ==
=== Medals ===
Gen Coetzee has been awarded:

- Southern Cross Medal (1975) (SM)
- iPhrothiya yeSiliva (Silver Protea) (PS)
- Military Merit Medal (MMM)
- Pro Patria Medal
- Southern Africa Medal
- General Service Medal (South Africa)
- Tshumelo Ikatelaho (General Service Medal)
- Unitas (Unity) Medal
- Mandela Commemoration Medal (Silver)
- Medalje vir Troue Diens (Medal for Loyal Service) (40 Year Clasp)
- Good Service Medal (Gold (30 Years))
- Good Service Medal (Silver (20 Years))
- Good Service Medal (Bronze (10 Years))
- Peacemaker Medal (Note: Portuguese: Medalha do Pacificador) (Brazil)

=== Proficiency and qualification badges ===
Gen Coetzee qualified for the following:

SA Special Forces Operator's Badge (Qualification) Black on Thatch beige, Embossed. Dagger enclosed with a laurel wreath	Free Fall Paratrooper (Qualification) Advanced, Freefall. Black on Thatch beige. Small Black wings

== Notes ==
Military offices
Preceded by Nicolas Mabilu	GOC SA Army Training Formation; 2016–2021	Succeeded by D.M. Madie
Preceded by Jan D. Malan	Director Doctrine and Policy, SA Army Brigade; 2014–2016	Succeeded by Nicolas Mabilu
Preceded by Krubert Nel	Chief of Staff of the South African Special Forces Brigade; 2003–2014	Unknown
Preceded by Col Julius Englebrecht	Officer Commanding 5 Special Forces Regiment; 1 February 1998–31 December 2005	Succeeded by Col Johan Spangenberg
Unknown	Officer Commanding 1 Parachute Battalion; Unknown– Unknown	Unknown
