= South African military assistance to the Central African Republic =

The South African Government has assisted the government of François Bozizé in the Central African Republic militarily. After 13 paratroopers were killed in the March 2013 battle for Bangui, the Zuma government came under heavy criticism and questioning for this support.

== Operation Morero ==
A South African National Defence Force Special Forces unit has provided personal protection for Bozizé since 2007.

== Operation Vimbezela ==
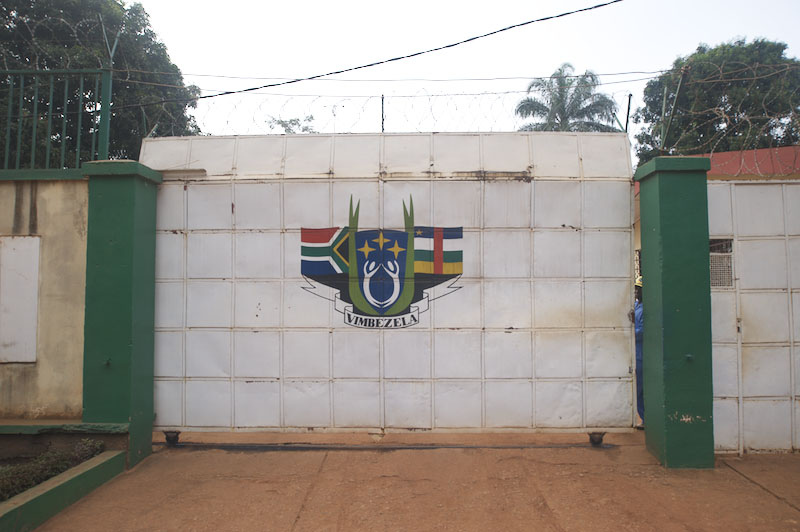
CAR Army Base "Vimbezela" in Bangui

In 2007 Bozizé requested assistance from South Africa for training the FACA and refurbishment of military facilities. The two nations signed a Memorandum of Understanding on 11 February 2007. In March the SANDF training and engineering personnel under the command of Col George Sibanyon. By September 2009, 123 FACA members had received leadership training, including 23 who attended courses in RSA.

== Anti-Séléka deployment ==
In January 2013 the SANDF deployed an additional 200 troops to the CAR, without either air or armour support. Thirteen soldiers from the 1 Parachute Battalion were killed.

David Maynier, the Democratic Alliance shadow minister of defence, Pieter Groenewald from the Freedom Front Plus and Pikkie Greeff from the South African National Defence Union, are seeking an official parliamentary inquest into the SANDF's role in Bangui.

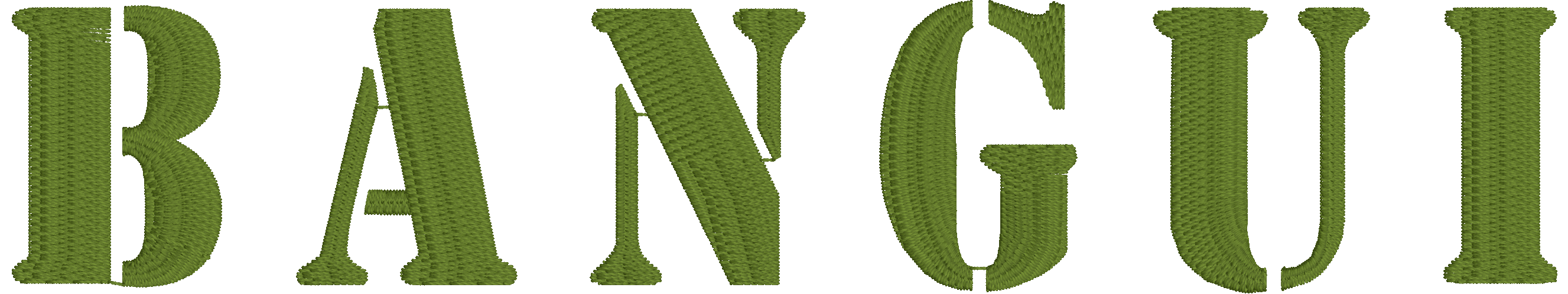
Computer simulation of Embroidered Battle Honour

The SANDF has since awarded Battle Honours to the three units involved in the battle in recognition their performance.

== See also ==
- Politics of the Central African Republic
- Central African Republic conflict (2012–present)
