= 44 Medical Task Group =

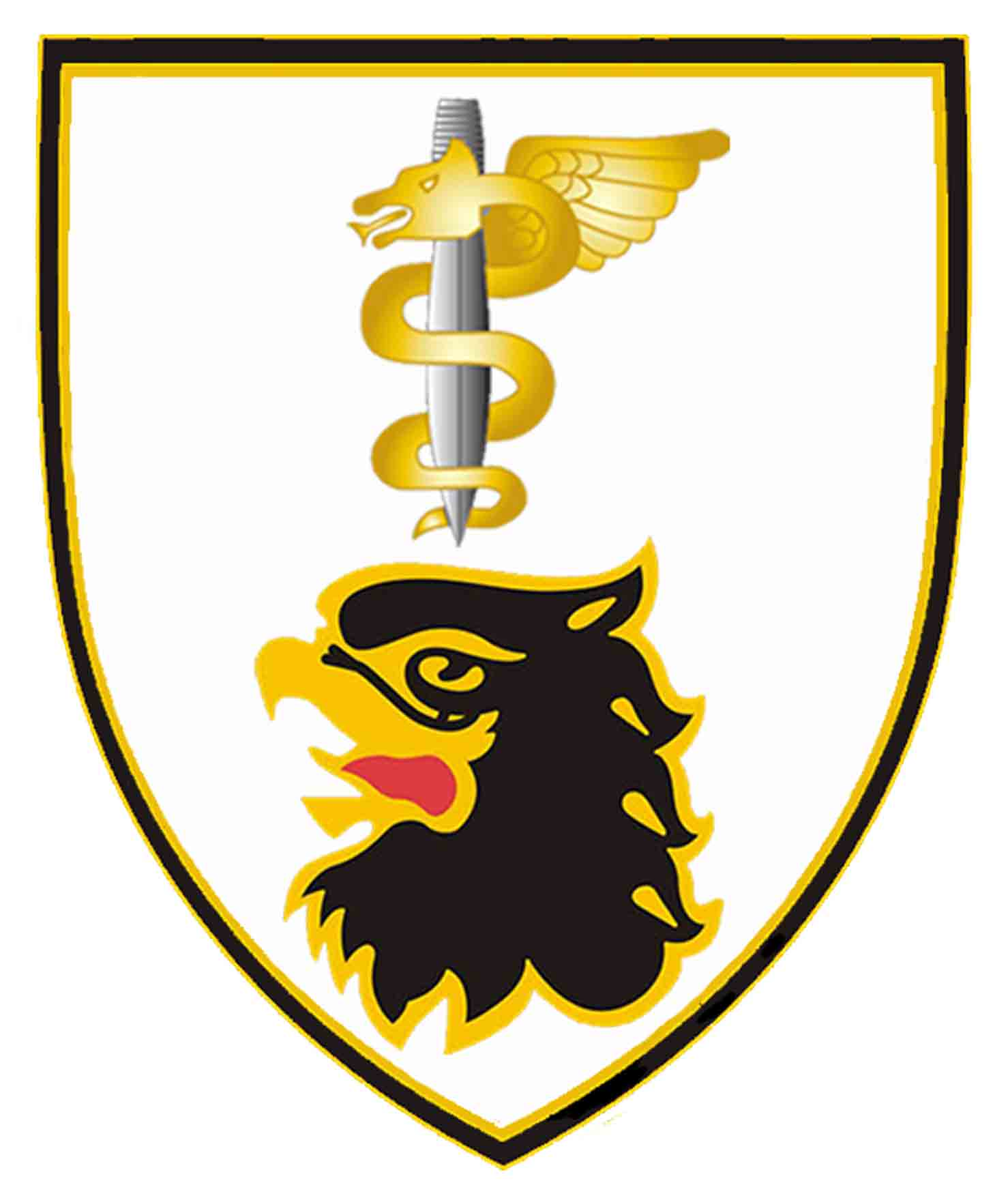
- 44 Medical Task Group insignia
- Founded: January 1978; 47 years ago
- Country: South Africa
- Branch: South African Army
- Type: Airborne Assault Medic

Commanders
- Notable commanders: Commandant Kriek Williamson

Insignia
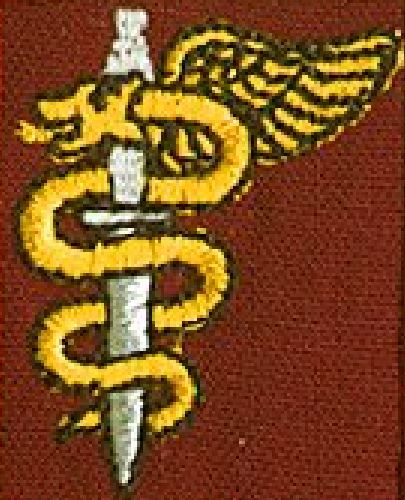
- Ops Medic identification_symbol_2=

South Africa's 44 Medical Task Group, part of 7 Medical Battalion Group, is permanently attached to 44 Parachute Brigade. The Task Group consists of parachute qualified Ops Medics, specialist soldiers who perform the recovery, stabilization and evacuation of wounded soldiers from behind enemy lines.

44 Medical Task Group is similar in function to the United States Air Force Special Operations Command (AFSOC) Pararescuemen (also known as PJs), who are tasked with the recovery and medical treatment of personnel in humanitarian and combat environments.

== Garrison ==
Based at 44 Parachute Regiment, Tempe, Bloemfontein, Free State, South Africa. 44 Medical Task Group consists of a platoon-sized medical contingent consisting of Operational Medical Support Operators or Ops Medics.

== Training Requirements ==
Para Ops Medics are trained under two main criteria:

- Military Medical Operations:

Para Ops Medics are qualified under Basic Life Support III. They are trained to stabilize patients, stop bleeding, maintain airways, suture wounds, administer drips and perform lifesaving medical procedures while evacuating patients out of a combat area.

- Para Selection /Training:

All members of 44 Medical Task Group are static line parachute qualified. Selected members are also Freefall, High Altitude Low Opening (HALO)/ High Altitude High Opening (HAHO) and/or Tandem parachute qualified, enabling the Medical Task Group to support the Parachute Battalions, Parachute School and Regiment in their full spectrum of requirements.
