= 2 Reconnaissance Commando (South Africa) =

South African special forces reserve unit (1974–1992)

2 Reconnaissance Commando/Regiment
- Active: 1 June 1974
- Disbanded: 1992
- Country: South Africa
- Allegiance: Republic of South Africa
- Branch: South African Army
- Type: Special forces
- Role: Reconnaissance
- Part of: South African Defence Force
- Garrison/HQ: Pretoria
- Motto: We Dare—Ons Waag

2 Reconnaissance Commando, redesignated 2 Reconnaissance Regiment in 1981, was the Active Citizen Force unit of the South African Special Forces. Its part-time personnel formed part of the reserve component of the South African Defence Force. It was based in Pretoria and disbanded in 1992.

== History ==
The unit was established in Pretoria in 1974 out of the Hunter Group. The Hunter Group was a body of Citizen Force soldiers who, under the auspices of the South African Irish Regiment, had begun arranging specialised training. They were formalised into a Special Forces unit largely at the insistence of Brigadier G. W. Germishuizen, then commanding officer of Witwatersrand Command.

Most of its complement were operators and support personnel who had left full-time military service for civilian careers. They remained available for call-up on Special Forces operations. The Truth and Reconciliation Commission recorded its total strength as between 2,000 and 3,000, of whom only a few hundred were operational.

Its first operational deployment came at the start of Operation Savannah (Angola). Members were called up from their civilian occupations at short notice. Some reached an operational area within a few days of leaving a civilian job in South Africa.

In 1981 the unit was redesignated 2 Reconnaissance Regiment. It was disbanded in 1992 as part of a rationalisation of the South African Defence Force.

== Leadership ==
The unit had only one commanding officer.

2 Reconnaissance Commando/Regiment
| From | Commanding Officers | To | Ribbon |
|---|---|---|---|
| 1 September 1974 | Maj D. S. van der Spuy (Note: Later Colonel) | 31 March 1992 | |
| From | Regimental Sergeants Major | To | Ribbon |
| 1 June 1974 | WO2 L. C. (Les) Greyling | 31 October 1976 | |
| 1 November 1976 | WO1 H. G. (Harry) Botha | 25 January 1984 | |
| 26 January 1984 | WO2 M. (Mike) Landman | 22 June 1988 | |
| 23 June 1988 | WO2 S. W. Fourie | 13 September 1989 | |
| 14 September 1989 | WO2 J. F. ("Strys") Strydom | 31 March 1992 | |

== See also ==
- South African Special Forces
