= Operation Argon =

South African special forces operation in Cabinda, Angola (May 1985)

Operation Argon (aka Operation Cabinda)
- Part of the South African Border War
- Location: Angola Operation Argon (Angola)
- Planned by: South African Defence Force
- Objective: Raid on Gulf Oil installations
- Date: 13–21 May 1985
- Executed by: 4 Reconnaissance Regiment
- Outcome: Angolan victory
- Casualties: 2; 2 killed

Operation Argon (sometimes denoted simply as Operation Cabinda) was an unsuccessful military operation carried out by South African special forces in May 1985 with the objective of destroying six fuel storage tanks at Malongo in Angola's Cabinda exclave.

== Background ==
On 13 May 1985 a modified South African Navy Daphne submarine carrying a nine-man Recce team, as well as a back-up team, left Saldanha Bay and travelled to a spot some way off the Angolan coast near its border with Zaire. The area contained oil storage installations run by the Angolans and Gulf Oil, and because of this, several large military bases were also placed in the vicinity.

The team had to travel 12 kilometres (7.5 mi) by sea, and then 21 kilometres (13 mi) by land, distances that were too far to travel in one night. They therefore had to spend a night ashore, and planned a ruse to make it appear that they had infiltrated from the East from Zaire, rather than from the sea.

== Infiltration ==

The Recces landed on the coast at night on 20 May following an advance scouting party sent to gather intelligence on the beach where the party would land. Under ideal cloudy skies, the Recce team's trip had been slowed by the need to launch their boats further from shore than anticipated. The longer journey, as well as rough seas, threw off the precise timing of the mission. Near shore, Captain Wynand Du Toit noticed a small fishing vessel in the area of the landing zone and that the occupants were on shore around a fire. This forced the team to wait offshore until the boat left the area. They were now three hours behind schedule, and the danger of being detected grew.

Upon landing the boats were hidden and a rendezvous point set up. The men climbed a bluff and followed a route that skirted a small village and led to a road. They miscalculated the distance to the road and turned back, losing an hour of valuable time. Du Toit decided to continue and reach the lying up position (LUP) in a densely wooded area within the two hours prior to dawn. South African Intelligence and aerial photographs showed an uninhabited area, but in fact it was surrounded by camouflaged People's Armed Forces for the Liberation of Angola (FAPLA) bases. The hide was finally reached as day broke. This proved to be far from ideal as a hiding place, as it was not part of the jungle, but an island of dense growth some distance from the jungle. The Recces hid in the undergrowth and spread into a defensive perimeter, one man at an observation post several yards to the north with a view of the course they had travelled.

As dawn broke, the features of a well-hidden FAPLA base became clear some 1,000 yards (910 m) from the LUP. A few hours later, a small FAPLA patrol could be seen following the tracks in the dew that they had left earlier. The team watched as the patrol withdrew, and then came back with a larger patrol which passed the hide. At 17.00 a three-men patrol followed the team's trail directly to the thicket where the Recces were hidden. They stopped short of entering the brush, and returned to their base. Meanwhile, a second patrol approached the hide from the other direction, and opened up heavy fire on the hidden position. As rocket propelled grenades (RPGs) struck their position, Captain Du Toit ordered the withdrawal of his troops. They had no choice but to double back on the trail that brought them to this position the previous night. Two of the men were wounded as they exited the trees. FAPLA troops deployed 50 yards (46 m) west of the site opened up with RPD machine guns, RPG and many AK-47s.

The team turned north, pursued by FAPLA soldiers. Another group of Angolan soldiers advanced from the west, flanking the Recces so that they could only go east now. They could see a group of trees, but needed to cross 40 yards (37 m) of waist-high grass to get to this cover. Du Toit took two men and made his way through the grass as the rest of the team hid in the thicket. The small team drew fire as over 30 troops moved onto the exposed position. Two South Africans (Corporal Rowland Liebenberg and Sergeant Louis van Breda) were killed and Du Toit was wounded and later captured.

The contact was over and two South African soldiers, corporals Liebenberg and Van Breda were dead. While Du Toit lay on his stomach, FAPLA soldiers approached and, thinking he was also dead, stripped his equipment – only then did they realise he was alive and shot him again through the neck. He remained awake with wounds in his neck, shoulder and arm as the FAPLA soldiers began to savagely beat him. The soldiers thought that he was a mercenary, though Du Toit tried to explain that he was in fact a South African Army officer. After being severely roughed up, he was finally taken to Cabinda for medical treatment then to a Luanda hospital.

== Aftermath ==
The remaining six Recce soldiers carefully made their way north, where they regrouped and were eventually picked up to be returned safely to South Africa. Their escape was due in part to being ignored after the Angolans captured Du Toit.

While imprisoned, Du Toit was interviewed by Jesse Jackson in August 1986. The Red Cross facilitated Du Toit's wife visiting him in prison on three separate occasions.

Captain Wynand du Toit was finally to be released on 7 September 1987 after some 837 days of solitary confinement in an Angolan prison in a complicated prisoner exchange arrangement brokered by Jean-Yves Ollivier. The exchange took place in Maputo, Mozambique where Du Toit was swapped for two ANC members and 133 Angolan soldiers.

SSgt Queiroz was awarded the Honoris Crux for his actions during the operation.

== See also ==
- 1980s in Angola
- List of operations of the South African Border War
- Military history of South Africa
- South African Border War
- South African National Defence Force
- South African Special Forces Brigade
