= 13 Signal Squadron =

13 Signals Squadron
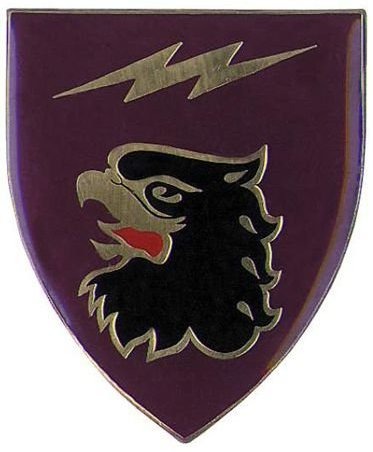
- 44 Signals emblem
- Active: April 1978 – present
- Country: South Africa
- Branch: South African Army South African Defence Force (SADF 1973–1994); South African Army South African National Defence Force (SANDF 1994–present)
- Type: Airborne Signals
- Size: Battalion
- Garrison/HQ: Tempe, Bloemfontein
- Nickname(s): Parabats

In April 1978, the South African Minister of Defence authorized the formation of 44 Signal Squadron. From 24 September 1980 until October 1986, 44 Signal Squadron supported 44 Brigade in all aspects of signals, e.g., the supply of communication and the manning of a Communication Centrum (Comcen). From 2 October 1986, the Squadron was upgraded to a Signal Unit with Commandant Lombard as commander and tasked to supply the Brigade with communication and establish a full-strength Unit. The unit's second in command was Maj P. Drotsky and the RSM P. Snyders. The signal unit flag was authorized in 1986. After the restructuring of the SADF as the SANDF in 1994, the unit was renamed 13 Signals Squadron.
