= Hunter Group =

- Active: May 1968
- Disbanded: 1976
- Country: South Africa
- Allegiance: Republic of South Africa
- Branch: South African Army
- Type: Non Military (unofficial) Training Group
- Role: Counter-insurgency
- Part of: South African Defence Force
- Garrison/HQ: Doornkop, Transvaal

Commanders
- Notable commanders: Commandant G. van Kerckhoven

Insignia
- Identification symbol: Scorpion

The Hunter Group was formed in 1968, as an experimental, non military group, with members of the group passing on some of their training (unofficially) onto other units of the South African Army.

== History ==
Hunter Group was formed in May 1968 by Commandant G. van Kerckhoven of the South African Irish Regiment who saw a need to expand the counter-insurgency skills of certain members in the regiment and which would be superior to the basic skills provided to the average national serviceman. He was aided by an ex-Rhodesian army civilian weapons and unarmed combat expert named Grant-Grierson. Initially it drew members from the SA Irish regiment but as it reputation grew volunteers from other army units also joined. Members received 240 hours of training over weekends and at night over twelve months.

Up to 700 men passed through the group's training with members forming or training the first special forces unit and 32 Battalion By 1976 the group had disbanded and its remaining members placed in Citizen Force (Reserve) unit 2 Reconnaissance Commando.

== Training ==
Training included activities such as close weapons use, first aid, vehicle driving, parachuting, guerrilla warfare, stress and shock training, bushcraft and survival, and many other skills. Member of the group wore privately purchased camouflaged and other uniforms with some in the style of airborne smocks, with a silver scorpion insignia on a green background on their right sleeve.
