= 4 Reconnaissance Commando (South Africa) =

- Active: 17 July 1978
- Disbanded: 31 July 1993
- Country: South Africa
- Allegiance: Republic of South Africa
- Branch: South African Army
- Type: Special forces
- Size: Regiment
- Part of: South African Defence Force
- Garrison/HQ: Langebaan, Western Cape
- Motto: Iron Fist From The Sea

The 4 Reconnaissance Commando was a South African Special Forces unit of the South African Defence Force that was formed in July 1978, specialising in amphibious operations.

== History ==
In 1976, during Operation Savannah, a need was identified for more operational special forces units and in particular units with more specialised skills. In March 1976, Major Malcolm Kinghorn formed a sub-unit specialising in amphibious warfare operations and special reconnaissance for use in Angola during Operation Savannah. It was formed at Salisbury Island, Durban and consisted of a headquarters unit of Kinghorn and a NCO and two units of six men each and was called Charlie (C) Group of 1 Reconnaissance Commando.

On 1 May 1976, the Defence Minister approved the formation of 4 Reconnaissance Commando but it would take a further two years before it was formally established. The unit was formed on the 17 July 1978 as 4 Reconnaissance Commando at Langebaan with Major Kinghorn as the first commanding officer and the first RSM was Warrant Officer “Chili” du Plessis. It was initially made up of members of 1 Reconnaissance Commando. On 1 January 1979, Major Kinghorn was given a temporary rank of Commandant. During the 1981 reorganisation, 4 Reconnaissance Commando was renamed 4 Reconnaissance Regiment (4RR). The unit was said to be small with mainly white soldiers who operated in Angola and Mozambique

== Structure ==
In 1978, 4 Reconnaissance Commando was initially structured into three groups:

- Alpha Group – amphibious operations training,
- Bravo Group – operational,
- Charlie Group – diving,

but when 4 Reconnaissance Commando was renamed 4 Reconnaissance Regiment in 1981 it was structured as:

4.1 Commando – operational component with five teams:

- Diving Team – offensive operational attack divers
- Boat Team – maintain and operate the teams boats and work with the naval vessels crews
- Offensive Team – carried out the special forces tasks
- Small Teams – carry out reconnaissance and lead the offensive teams to the targets
- Reconnaissance Team – handle intelligence gathering operations in larger teams

4.2 Commando – training element later called Special Forces Amphibious and Urban School

== Re-organisation after 1992 ==
The next reorganisation occurred in 1992 when the Special Forces HQ was disbanded and renamed the Directorate Reconnaissance Forces and 4 RR remained but 2RR, the citizen force unit, was disbanded. In 1993, a further reorganisation occurred when the Directorate Reconnaissance Forces was renamed as the 45 Para Brigade and 4 Reconnaissance Commando was renamed the 453 Para Battalion. The last change occurred in 1995, 45 Para Brigade became the Special Forces Brigade and subsequently 453 Para Battalion is now called 4 Special Forces Regiment.

== Leadership ==
4 Reconnaissance Commando
| From | Commanding Officers | To | Ribbon |
|---|---|---|---|
| 1978 | Cmdt M. Kinghorn | 1982 | |
| 1982 | Col J. Venter | 1994 | |
| 3 January 1994 | Col K. E. Nel SD,SM,MMM (Note: Later Brigadier General) (Note: Later Chief of Staff Joint Operations Division) | 13 March 1998 | Southern Cross Decoration SD Southern Cross Medal SM Military Merit Medal MMM |
