= 1 Parachute Battalion =

Paratroop unit of the South African Army

1st Parachute Battalion
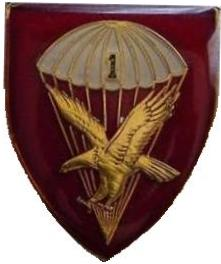
- Active: 1 April 1961 – present
- Country: South Africa
- Branch: South African Army SADF 1973-1994; South African Army SANDF 1994-present
- Type: Airborne Light Infantry
- Role: Airborne Paratroopers
- Size: Battalion
- Garrison/HQ: Tempe, Bloemfontein
- Nickname: Parabats
- Mottos: Ex alto vincimus (We conquer from Above)

Commanders
- Current commander: Lt. Col. D. Mziki
- Notable commanders: Brigadier M.J. du Plessis; Colonel Jan Breytenbach

1 Parachute Battalion (Ex Alto Vincimus) is the only full-time paratroop unit of the South African Army. It was founded on 1 April 1961, along with the Parachute Battalion. The name of this unit was changed to Parachute Training Centre after 1998. It was the first battalion within 44 Parachute Brigade until 1999 when the brigade was downsized to a regiment.

The battalion has performed many active operations in battle – producing many highly decorated soldiers – in the South African Border War from 1966 to 1989. Their best known action was the controversial Battle of Cassinga in 1978.

The unit's nickname "Parabat" is a portmanteau derived from the words "Parachute Battalion".

== History ==
=== Origin ===
In 1960 fifteen volunteers from the SADF were sent to England at RAF Abingdon, the majority to train as parachute instructors, some as parachute-packers and one SAAF pilot in the dropping of paratroopers. These men together with an older unit called 2 Mobile Watch formed the nucleus of 1 Parachute Battalion at Tempe in Bloemfontein in April 1961.

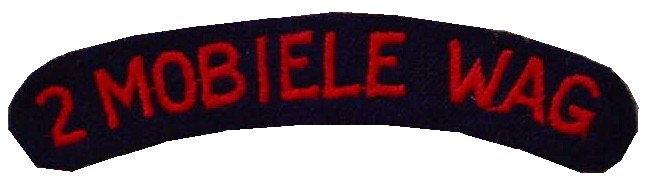
UDF era 2 Mobile Watch Shoulder title

The first paratroopers were Permanent Force men, but soon the training of Citizen Force (similar to the National Guard of the United States) paratroopers commenced.

=== First Action ===
Members of 1 Parachute Battalion were the first S.A. Army soldiers to see action after World War II when, in 1966, they participated, with the South African Police, against insurgents in South West Africa.

In 1966, members of 1 Parachute Battalion participated in the first action in the war in South West Africa during a heliborne assault on an insurgent base. Thereafter, they were involved in operations in SWA/Namibia, Angola, Zambia, Mozambique and Rhodesia (now Zimbabwe) and elsewhere on an almost constant basis for over 20 years.

=== Organisation under the SADF ===
1 Parachute Bn. was organised as follows:

- Permanent Force:
  - Bn H.Q.,
  - H.Q. Coy and
  - A and B Coy's;
- Citizen Force:
  - C Coy Cape Town,
  - D Coy Durban,
  - E Coy Pretoria and
  - F Coy Johannesburg

=== Development of Sister Units ===
Further battalions were added: 2 Para Bn in 1971 and 3 Para Bn in 1977.

=== Border War ===
On the night of 4 June 1974 40 paratroopers from 1 Parachute Battalion B Company jumped into Angola as support for a group of Recce's on a counter insurgency mission against SWAPO in southern Zambia. Following this operation Recce Lieutenant Freddie Zeelie was killed on 23 June 1974 and became the first SADF soldier killed in combat during a contact with insurgents in southern Angola during the border war era. In 1974 and 1975 1 Parachute Battalion operated along the Angolan border with S.W.A; along the Caprivi Strip; a platoon jumped near Luiana (September 1975), Angola to relieve a group of "Bushmen" trapped by a SWAPO force; and 3 platoons Joined Operation Savannah at Sá da Bandeira the day after the airport was taken (October 1975). The two platoons withdrew in February/March Operation Savannah during the Angolan Civil War in July 1975 when 1 string of 1 Parachute Battalion were flown to Ondangwa and travelled by Unimog to Ruancana on the northern border of SWA at Ruacana and Santa Clara in Angola to relieve two Portuguese communities trapped by the MPLA.

=== The Para Brigade ===
With the coming of 44 Parachute Brigade in April 1978, under the leadership of Brigadier M J du Plessis and Colonel Jan Breytenbach, a co-founder of the brigade. it became a powerful force. The first large airborne exercise of the Parachute Battalion Group took place in 1987 in the Northwestern Transvaal (now North West Province). With the eventual disbanding of 44 Parachute Brigade its full-time personnel were moved to Bloemfontein and incorporated into the 1 Parachute Battalion Group.

=== New Techniques ===
In 1986, the unit embarked on its first HALO/HAHO (High altitude Low Opening/High Altitude High Opening) course in Bloemfontein. This would enable the troops to drop into enemy territory from aircraft following commercial routes.

=== Under the SANDF ===
In 2001 battalion personnel formed the spearhead of the South African Protection Support Detachment deploying to Burundi.

In 2012, 1 Parachute Battalion participated in the South African military assistance to the Central African Republic operation, where the unit suffered 13 killed, with 27 injured and one missing in action in an ambush conducted by Séléka rebels. In 2014 it was announced that 1 Parachute Battalion would receive Battle Honours for this operation.

In 2013, the battalion contributed one company, under command of Major Vic Vrolik, to the FIB which fought a number of engagements in the DRC.

== Training ==
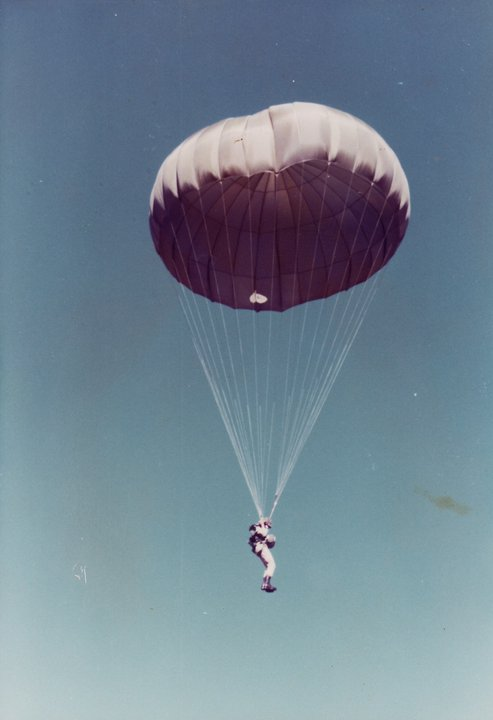
Qualification Jump

1 Parachute Battalion is the sole military parachute training institution in South Africa, with its parachute School being responsible for all training. The school has had only four fatalities in its existence. 1 Parachute Battalion is a full-time unit which in addition to parachute training also conducts force training to recruits inducted into the unit and other units in the South African Army.

The average age ranges in the mid-twenties. The selection and training of paratroops is rigorous to ensure a standard of combat efficiency is retained at a high level.

=== Recruitment ===
Members of 1 Parachute Battalion visit the various battalions each year early in the training cycle to look for volunteers. These must then pass a physical test at their unit prior to appearing before a selection board, which examines their character and motivation.

=== Initial evaluation ===
To give would-be members the endurance and the fitness they will need for operations in the harsh African conditions, the instructors of 44 Parachute Brigade place particular emphasis on basic physical training. Soldiers volunteering for service with the parachute forces first undergo a battery of medical tests – similar to that for flying personnel – before setting off on a 5 kilometres (3.1 mi) timed run. Before they can recover their breath, they tackle the second test: 200 metres (0.12 mi) run in which each man carries another on his back.

Those who are accepted are then transferred to 1 Para, where they first complete the normal three-month basic training course, with some differences: PT three times a day, no walking in camp under any circumstances and a 10 to 15 kilometres (6.2 to 9.3 mi) run to end each day. 20 kilometres (12 mi) runs carrying tar poles; car tyres attached to the candidates by a long rope; or the dreaded 25 kilograms (55 lb) concrete slab that has to be carried everywhere the candidate goes.

The would-be paratroops get a 24-hour ration pack or "rat pack" for the duration of the selection. During these days, they are given several tasks to perform in an allocated time: Several 20 to 30 kilometres (12 to 19 mi) Night marches/runs with 25 kilograms (55 lb) bergens, boxing, 75 kilograms (165 lb) stretcher run over 20 kilometres (12 mi), digging trenches and the carrying of artillery canisters over 10 kilometres (6.2 mi) during a timed run are just a few of the tasks that has to be completed. On top of all this the candidates are out in the African bush with no showers, hot meals or beds after each gruelling day. Each year the sequence of what "tests" will be done to get the strongest out of the "wannabees" changes, so it comes as quite a surprise each year. Due to lack of sleep, hunger and extreme physical tasks many of the men give up. After all the above tests, the few remaining soldiers head back to camp where they have to complete an obstacle course called the "Elephant". Some foreign Elite soldiers claimed this to be one of the hardest bone breaking obstacle courses ever. Again, this is a timed exercise, which has to be completed several times, it is also done with full battle kit. Again the instructors are looking for any hesitant students during the high obstacles and underwater swim through a narrow tunnel. At the end of the "Elephant" several more students drop out due to injury or not completing the course in the required time. At this point the course has been completed. However, there is always the 'bad surprise" which has historically become part of the Selection Phase.

After a six-month ordeal, the selected few (about 40% of the original intake), make the 12 jumps required to obtain their wings. During this time, the chances of being disqualified are still very high. This phase is followed by some advanced individual training, during which such subjects as advanced driving, demolitions, tactics and patrolling, unarmed combat, survival skills, escape and evasion, aspects of guerrilla warfare, tracking, raiding, counterinsurgency operations, fast rope skills, ambush and anti-ambush techniques and foreign weapons and techniques are covered.

Their instructors, however, always find that something is left to be desired with the inspection which invariably follows. To harden their muscles, trainees are made to carry a telegraph pole for two days, at a rate of 20 kilometres (12 mi) daily. Back at base, the 'marble', a stone weighing about 25 kilograms (55 lb) which the soldier must carry wherever he goes, is used as a substitute for the same purpose. The detailed training programme is listed below:

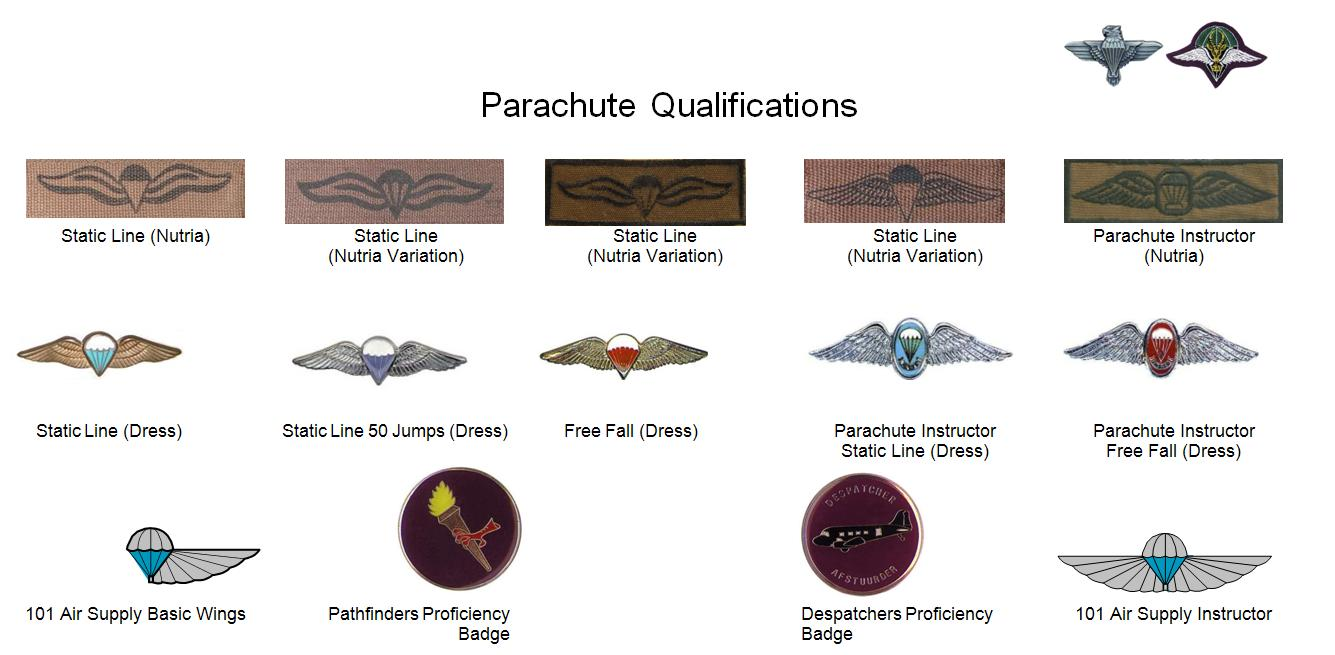
Qualifications

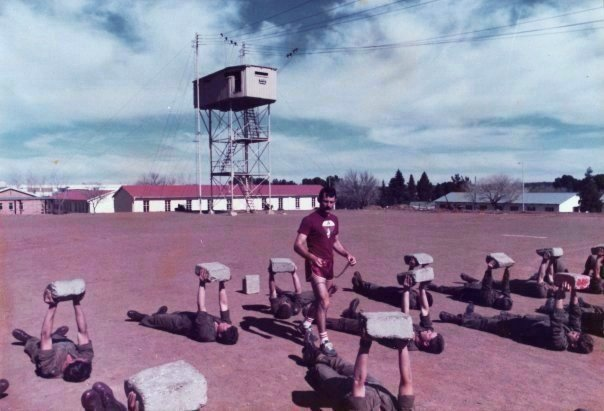
Physical Training with the "Marble"

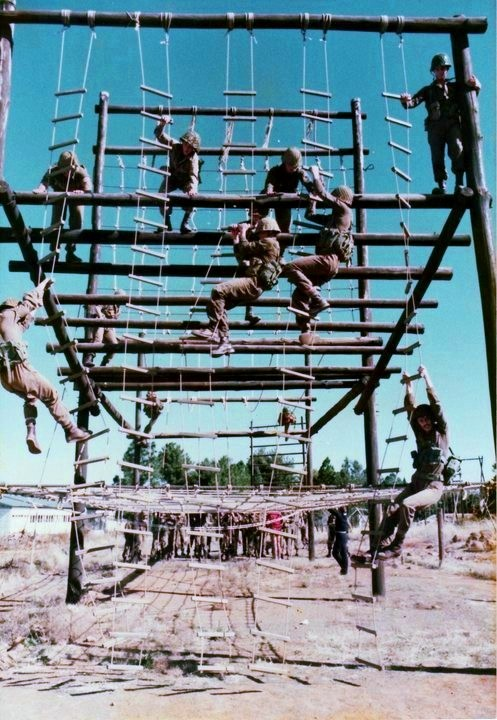
Obstacle Course, "The Elephant"

=== Basic training – 10 weeks ===
- Musketry
- Field Craft
- Drill
- Map Reading
- Buddy Aid
- Physical Training – Very important

=== Parachute qualification training – 5 weeks ===
- Parachute Selection – 2 Weeks (8 hours Physical Training every day for 2 weeks)
  - Running 9 kilometres (5.6 mi) and more with boots
  - Running up to 21 kilometres (13 mi) with logs
  - Battle PT with Logs, Concrete Blocks and Rifles
  - Route Marches of 14 kilometres (8.7 mi) with full kit
  - Boxing, Soccer, Wrestling, Rugby with Car Tyre as ball
  - Callisthenic Exercises
  - Qualification Tests (60% must be attained after the 2 weeks Parachute Selection)
    - 3.2 kilometres (2.0 mi) with full kit in 18 minutes
    - 40 Shuttle Runs in 90 seconds
    - 200 metres (0.12 mi) fireman's lift with full kit
    - Climb a 6-metre rope
    - Climb over a 2-metre wall with full kit
    - 50 pushups without resting
    - 67 sit-ups in 2 minutes
    - 120 squat kicks without resting
- Parachute training – 3 weeks following successful parachute selection
  - Ground training in hangar
  - Jumping from "aapkas" (Outdoor exit trainer)
  - Jumping from Dakota Aircraft
  - Jumping from C130 / C160 Transall Aircraft
  - Jumping includes day and night jumps, with and without kit using standard and steerable parachutes
  - A total of 8 jumps must be completed before the sought after paratrooper wings are awarded
    - Current Day Selection and Training for the Physical portion of the Parachute Course
    - Until 1991 the physical portion of the Parachute Qualifying course was 2 weeks, but due to national service being shortened to one year, the army had a need to change and make the training more compact and fast-paced. However some of the 'older' paratroops still do physical training courses to ensure that standards do not drop.

=== Individual training – 8 weeks ===
- Platoon Weapons
- Battle Craft
- Specialist Training (in one of the following mustering)
  - Section Leaders
  - Rifleman
  - Mortar man
  - Anti-Tank Gunner
  - Machine Gunner
  - Signaler
  - Intelligence NCO
  - Medical Orderly
  - Driver
  - Clerk
  - Parachute Packer
  - Store man

=== Conventional warfare training – 10 weeks ===
- Advance
- Defence
- Withdrawal
- Cooperation with Armoured, Artillery, Air Force etc.
- Airborne Operations including Air Assault battle handling on sub-unit level

=== Counter-insurgency (COIN) training – 9 weeks ===
- Bush Warfare Techniques
- Reaction Force Operations
- Specialized Air Operations
- Airborne Raids

=== Active operational duty ===
- Once a paratroop is fully trained, he takes part in the normal operational and training activities of the unit.

=== Other Training ===
- Specialist Parachute and other Training Courses include:
  - Pathfinder Training
  - Basic fast-roping/rappelling skills
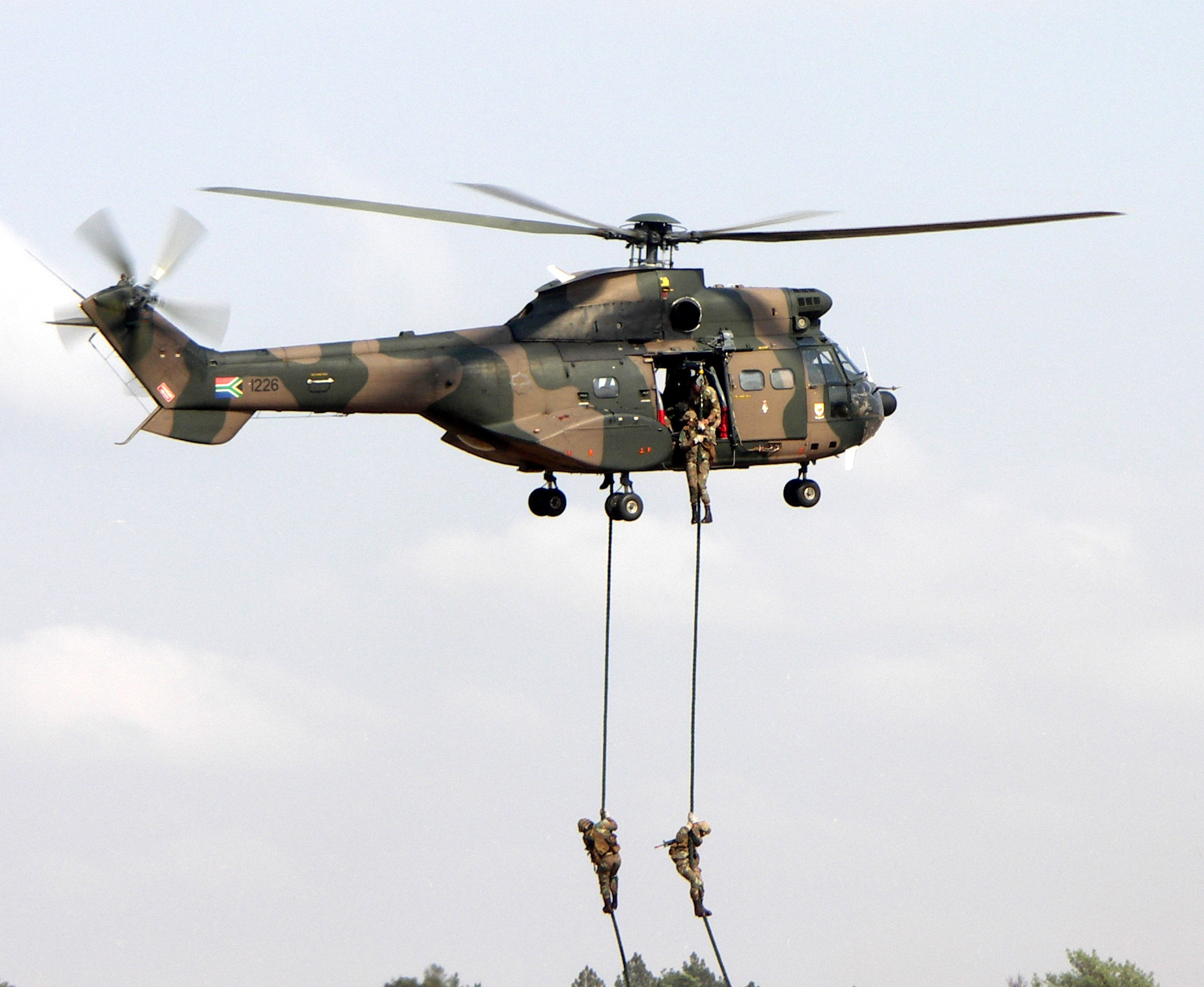
    Fast roping from a South African Air Force Atlas Oryx
  - Fast-roping/rappelling dispatchers
  - Fast-roping/rappelling instructors
  - Static Line dispatchers course
  - Basic Parachute instructors course
  - Advance static line jump course
  - Basic Free Fall Course
  - Free fall dispatchers course
  - Free fall instructors course
  - Advanced free fall course
  - Advanced free fall instructors course
  - Drop zone safety officers course
  - Parachute Packing and checking course
  - Tandem parachuting

== Leadership ==
1 Parachute Battalion Leadership
From	Commanding Officers	To	Ribbon
1961	Lt Col Willem Louw SSA,SM (Note: Later Lieutenant General)	1965	Star of South Africa SSA Southern Cross Medal SM
1965	Cmdt J Fourie	1967	
1967	Cmdt MJ du Plessis	1968	
1968	Cmdt GJ Viviers	1972	
1972	Cmdt JPM Möller	1974	
1974	Cmdt TE Olckers	1977	
1978	Cmdt DJ Moore (Note: Later Colonel)	1981	
1982	Col AL van Graan	1983	
1983	Col CE le Roux SD,SM,MMM (Note: Later Major General)	1988	Southern Cross Decoration SD Southern Cross Medal SM Military Merit Medal MMM
1988	Col JR Hills	1990	
1990	Col L Rudman PVD,SD,SM,MMM,SAStC	1991	Pro Virtute Decoration PVD Southern Cross Decoration SD Southern Cross Medal SM Military Merit Medal MMM South African Staff Corps SAStC
1992	Cmdt JPJ Brooks	1994	
1994	Cmdt M Taljaard	1995	
1995	Lt Col CL Cilliers	1997	
1997	Lt Col C Botha (Note: Acting (Temporarily holding the post without confirmation))	1998	
1998	Lt Col JPJ Brooks	1998	
1998	Lt Col JPS le Roux	2000	
2000	Lt Col E Fullard	2002	
2004	Lt Col C Rogers	2009	
2009	Lt Col D Mziki	Unknown	
Unknown	Lt Col Renier (Doibi) Coetzee SM,PS,MMM (Note: Later Brigadier General)	Unknown	Southern Cross Medal SM iPhrothiya yeSiliva PS Military Merit Medal MMM
From	Regimental Sergeants Major	To	Ribbon
	No known incumbents		

== Insignia ==
=== Previous Dress Insignia ===
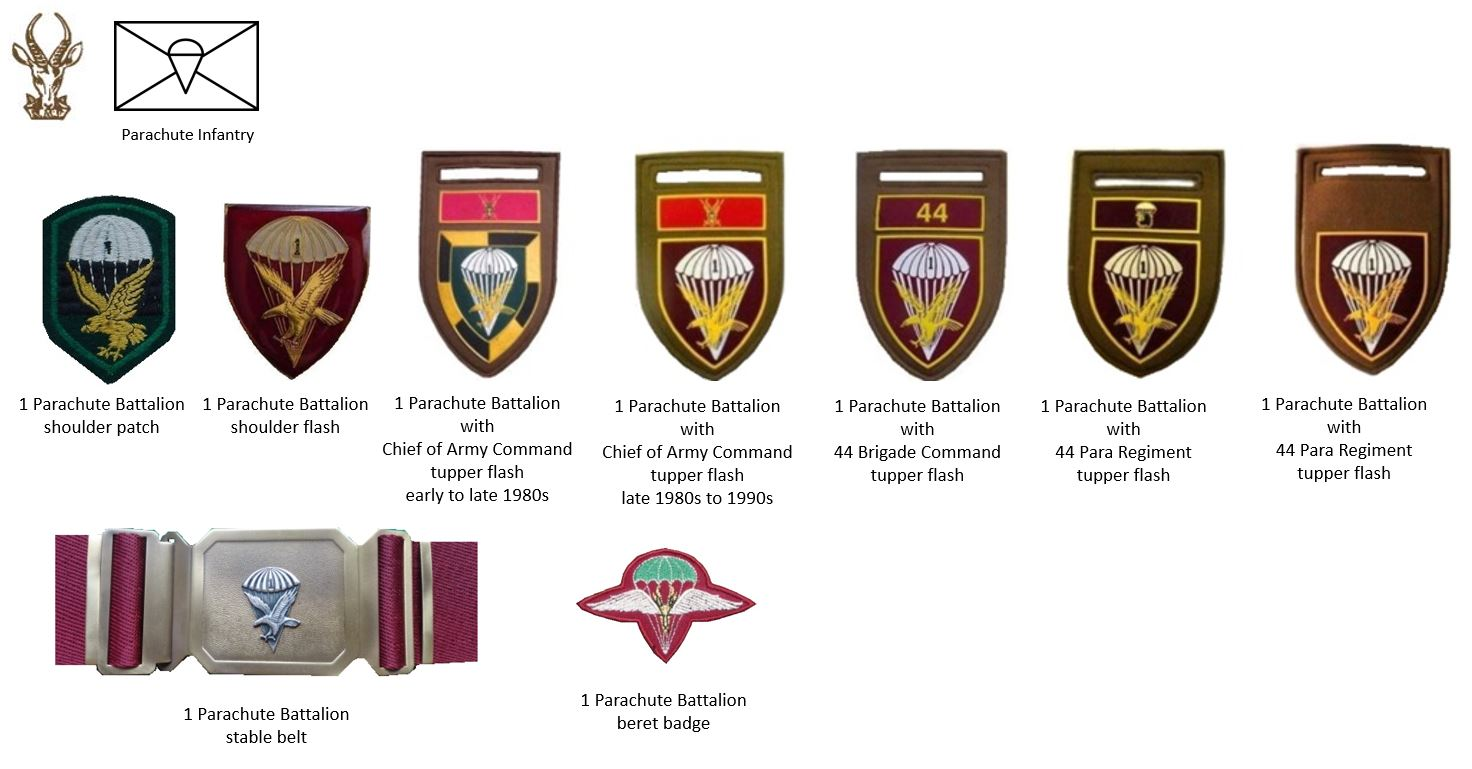
SADF era 1 Parachute Battalion insignia

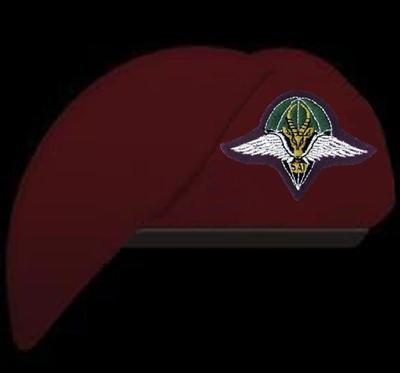
1 Parachute Battalion beret

== Battle Honours ==
(Note: On 20 February 2014 three units were awarded battle honours to be displayed on the unit colours for their participation in the Battle of Bangui in the Central African Republic during March 2013.)

Awarded to 1 Parachute Battalion
Awarded
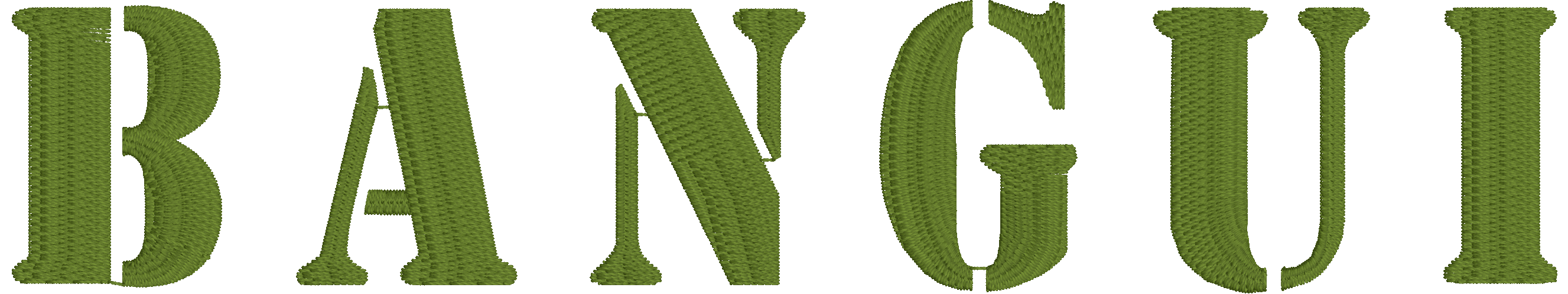
