= List of equipment of the South African Army =

Flag of the South African Army

This is a list of equipment of the South African Army, covering only ground forces. It includes current equipment such as small arms, personal equipment, combat vehicles, artillery, air-defence and missile systems, logistics and utility vehicles, engineering equipment, unmanned drones, watercraft, as well as future equipment and planned acquisitions.

The South African Army's inventory consists largely of domestically produced weapons, with around 80% sourced from the local defence industry and the remaining 20% being a mix of European, Israeli, and American systems. South Africa has the largest and most advanced defence industry in Africa, enabling the army to achieve a high degree of self-sufficiency in its equipment.

Due to the size of the South African Army and the limited availability of official inventory figures, it is difficult to accurately determine the full extent of its equipment holdings. Since post-apartheid downsizing, large quantities of equipment have been withdrawn from frontline service, placed into reserve formations or long-term storage, sold abroad, converted into specialised variants, or retired entirely in order to reduce operating costs. Where possible, this article distinguishes between the total quantity historically acquired and the number reportedly retained in South African Army inventory according to publicly available defence sources and estimates.

== Weapons ==
Note: This section covers only the standard small arms and light weapons operated by the South African Army. Weapons used exclusively by the South African Special Forces are listed separately, as that branch maintains its own inventory distinct from the conventional army. For weapons used by the Special Forces, see: South African Special Forces equipment.

=== Pistols ===
| Name | Origin | Type | Calibre | Image | Details |
|---|---|---|---|---|---|
| Vektor Z88 | South Africa | Semi-automatic pistol | 9×19mm | | 15-round semi-automatic service pistol license-produced from the Italian Beretta 92F platform. Issued as the standard sidearm of the South African Army and widely used across SANDF services for personal defence and secondary weapon roles. |
| Vektor SP1 | South Africa | Semi-automatic pistol | 9×19mm | | 15-round semi-automatic pistol developed as a more compact complement to the standard-issue Z88 service pistol. Primarily used alongside the Z88 by specialist personnel and infantry officers. The pistol remains compatible with standard 9×19 mm Parabellum ammunition and existing SANDF sidearm logistics. |

=== Infantry rifles ===
| Name | Origin | Type | Calibre | Image | Details |
|---|---|---|---|---|---|
| Vektor R4 | South Africa | Assault rifle | 5.56×45mm | | South African assault rifle and carbine family developed from the Israeli Galil platform for operations in harsh African environments. The R4 serves as the standard-issue service rifle, while the shorter R5 carbine is primarily used by mechanised and airborne infantry, as well as vehicle crews. Under Project African Warrior, many rifles received upgraded rail systems, adjustable stocks, optical-sight compatibility, and improved ergonomics for modern combat operations. The rifles fire 5.56×45 mm NATO ammunition and are fed from 35-round detachable magazines. |
| Vektor R5 | South Africa | Carbine rifle | 5.56×45mm | | |
| Vektor R1 | South Africa | Battle rifle | 7.62×51mm | | Battle rifle family based on the Belgian FN FAL platform. The R1 previously served as the standard-issue rifle of the SADF, while the compact R2 variant was developed for airborne and seaborne units requiring improved mobility. Although largely replaced by the R4/R5, remaining rifles continue to serve in reserve stocks and designated marksman roles. Some examples have also received upgraded optics rails and precision-support modifications. The rifles fire 7.62×51 mm NATO ammunition and are fed from 20-round detachable magazines. |
| Vektor R2 | South Africa | Battle rifle | 7.62×51mm | | |

=== Long range rifles ===
| Name | Origin | Type | Calibre | Image | Details |
|---|---|---|---|---|---|
| Truvelo CMS Counter Measure Sniper | South Africa | Bolt action sniper rifle | 12.7×99mm.338 Lapua 7.62×51mm | | Bolt-action precision rifle family developed for long-range sniper and anti-materiel operations. Employed by the Army Infantry Sniper Corps and Special Forces in anti-personnel, anti-equipment, and precision-support roles. The rifle family features a modular aluminium chassis, folding stock, quick-change barrel system, and compatibility with advanced optical and thermal sighting equipment. Multiple calibre configurations are used including; 7.62×51 mm NATO, .338 Lapua Magnum, and 12.7×99 mm NATO (.50 BMG) with effective ranges exceeding 800 m, 1,200 m, and 1,800 m. |
| Denel NTW-20 | South Africa | Anti-materiel sniper rifle | 20×82mm 14.5×114m | | Heavy anti-materiel rifle developed for long-range engagement of hardened and high-value targets. Used by Special Forces and the Infantry Sniper Corps for counter-materiel and long-range precision-fire operations. The rifle features a reinforced chassis, recoil mitigation systems, interchangeable barrel assemblies, and compatibility with specialised long-range optics and thermal sighting equipment. The NTW-20 is chambered in 20×82 mm and 14.5×114 mm configurations, featuring interchangeable calibre-conversion capability and compatibility with armour-piercing (AP), incendiary, and high-explosive (HE) ammunition. Effective engagement ranges vary between approximately 1,500–2,300 m depending on calibre and ammunition type. |
| Truvelo DMR | South Africa | Designated marksman rifle | 5.56x45mm 7.62×51mm | | South African designated marksman rifle (DMR) developed to provide infantry marksmen with extended-range precision fire capability between standard service rifles and dedicated sniper systems. Designed around a modern AR-15 style platform with full-length rail systems, adjustable furniture, and compatibility with magnified optics and bipods. The rifle is currently undergoing evaluation under Project Tedu. |

=== Submachine guns ===
| Name | Origin | Type | Calibre | Image | Details |
|---|---|---|---|---|---|
| HK MP5 | Germany | Submachine gun | 9×19mm | | Submachine gun used in limited numbers by South African Special Forces, military police units, and army reconnaissance elements. Primarily employed for close-quarters combat (CQB) and urban operations. Variants in service include the MP5A3 with collapsible stock, the integrally suppressed MP5SD for covert operations, and the compact MP5K for vehicle crews and protection details. |

=== Machine guns ===
| Name | Origin | Type | Calibre | Image | Details |
|---|---|---|---|---|---|
| FN MAG | Belgium | General-purpose machine gun | 7.62×51mm | | Belt-fed general-purpose machine gun (GPMG) used for sustained suppressive fire across infantry, vehicle-mounted, and aerial support roles. Widely employed at section and platoon level throughout SANDF formations. The weapon is valued for its reliability, maintainability, and compatibility with NATO-standard ammunition stocks. It is commonly mounted on bipods, tripods, vehicles, and helicopter platforms. The FN MAG fires 7.62×51 mm NATO ammunition and is belt-fed using disintegrating link belts. |
| Vektor SS-77 | South Africa | General-purpose machine gun | 7.62×51mm | | Belt-fed general-purpose machine gun (GPMG) developed as a locally manufactured alternative to the FN MAG. Used in infantry support, convoy protection, and vehicle-mounted fire-support roles. The SS-77 fires 7.62×51 mm NATO ammunition and operates at an approximate cyclic rate of 700 rounds per minute. |
| M2 Browning | United States | Heavy machine gun | 12.7×99mm | | Heavy machine gun (HMG) employed in vehicle-mounted, defensive, and long-range support roles. Used against personnel, light vehicles, and fortified positions across mechanised and motorised formations. The weapon is commonly mounted on tripods, armoured vehicles, protected mobility vehicles, and remote controlled weapon stations (RCWS). The M2 Browning fires 12.7×99 mm NATO ammunition and has an effective range exceeding 1,800 m. |
| MG4 Browning | United States | Medium machine gun | 7.62×51mm | | South African-modified medium machine gun (MMG) based on the Browning M1919A4 platform. Primarily employed as a coaxial and secondary armament on armoured vehicles and helicopters. Locally converted to fire NATO-standard 7.62×51 mm ammunition and integrated into various vehicle fire-control and sighting systems. |

=== Shotguns ===
| Name | Origin | Type | Calibre | Image | Details |
|---|---|---|---|---|---|
| Stoeger SP312 | Turkey | Pump action combat shotgun | 12 gauge | | 12-gauge pump-action combat shotgun used in guard, breaching, and close-quarters combat roles. Issued to infantry, military police, and security personnel for urban and internal-security operations. The shotgun is capable of firing lethal and less-lethal ammunition including buckshot, slugs, rubber rounds, and breaching loads. Its simple pump-action design is valued for reliability in harsh operating conditions. |

=== Grenade launchers ===
| Name | Origin | Type | Calibre | Image | Details |
|---|---|---|---|---|---|
| Milkor MGL | South Africa | Grenade launcher | 40×46 mm LV 40x51 mm MV | | A multi-shot grenade launcher family developed for rapid short-range fire support and area suppression. Widely used by infantry, Special Forces, and policing units in urban combat operations. Variants include the improved Y2 service model and the newer Y4 SuperSix capable of firing medium-velocity ammunition. The launchers are equipped with optical sights, laser rangefinders, and are compatible with a wide range of lethal and less-lethal grenade types. The weapon fires 40 mm grenades from a 6-round revolving cylinder with practical rates of fire reaching approximately 18 rounds per minute. |
| Denel Y3 AGL | South Africa | Grenade machine gun | 40×53 mm HV | | Automatic grenade launcher (AGL) developed for sustained explosive fire support and area suppression. Commonly mounted on vehicles, tripods, and protected mobility platforms for convoy protection and mechanised infantry support. The weapon has a 325–375 RPM rate of fire and an effective range of up to 1,500 m. |

=== Anti-armour weapons ===
| Name | Origin | Type | Warhead | Image | Details |
|---|---|---|---|---|---|
| MILAN ADT-ER | France Germany | ATGM Anti-tank guided missile | 115 mm | | Franco-German wire-guided anti-tank missile system used by mechanised infantry units for medium-range anti-armour operations. The missile was commonly mounted on tripods and Ratel IFVs, providing infantry units with a reliable anti-tank capability during and after the Border War. Upgraded launchers and missile stocks later remained in secondary service following Project Kingfisher, which modernised dozens of launchers to MILAN ADT-ER extended-range standard. The upgraded MILAN has an operational range of approximately 3,000 m with improved penetration and engagement capability compared to earlier variants. |
| ZT3 Ingwe | South Africa | ATGM Anti-tank guided missile | 152 mm | | South African long-range anti-tank guided missile system (ATGM) designed to defeat modern main battle tanks and fortified positions. Used by mechanised infantry and vehicle-mounted anti-tank units on Ratel and Badger combat vehicles. The missile was later upgraded to the ZT3A2 baseline standard under Project Adrift further improving penetration, guidance, and range performance. The ZT3 Ingwe uses laser beam-riding guidance and has an effective range of up to approximately 5,000 m. |
| RPG-7 | Soviet Union | RPG Rocket-propelled grenade | 40 mm | | Soviet-designed rocket-propelled grenade launcher captured during the Border War and later integrated into SANDF inventory for infantry anti-armour and anti-structure roles. The launcher remains valued for its simplicity, portability, and wide variety of compatible rocket types despite its ageing design. It continues to see use with light infantry units in irregular warfare, bunker clearance, and close-range engagements. The RPG-7 fires unguided rockets with an effective range of approximately 200–500 m. |
| Denel FT5 | South Africa | Anti-tank rocket weapon | 100 mm | | South African-developed unguided anti-tank rocket weapon designed to replace the ageing French LRAC F1 and Soviet RPG-7 that were in service at the time. Operated by anti-tank teams and specialist combat formations for long-range anti-armour and anti-structure missions. The missile uses advanced tandem-HEAT warheads for defeating modern armour and large bunkers. Since 2007 the weapons have been placed in reserve as its ammunition was considered to be too expensive to fire during exercises. |
| Carl Gustaf M4 | Sweden | Recoilless rifle | 84 mm | | Swedish-designed reusable recoilless rifle adopted as a modern multi-role infantry support weapon for anti-armour, anti-structure, and fire-support operations. It serves in limited service with several infantry battalions as a replacement for older rocket-launcher systems like the RPG-7. The weapon is compatible with thermal sights, optical fire-control systems, and a wide variety of ammunition types. The launcher fires 84 mm ammunition with an effective range of approximately 500 m against armoured targets. |
| AT4 | Sweden | Recoilless rifle | 84 mm | | Disposable anti-armour launcher introduced alongside the Carl Gustaf M4 as a lightweight one-shot infantry support weapon. Used in anti-armour, breaching, and anti-structure roles where portability and rapid deployment are prioritised. The launcher is compatible with multiple warhead types including HEAT and thermobaric rounds. The weapon fires 84 mm ammunition with an effective range of approximately 300–500 m depending on target type. |
| M40A1 recoilless rifle | United States | Recoilless rifle | 105 mm | | Crew-served recoilless rifle developed for direct-fire anti-armour and infantry fire-support operations. Operated by motorised and airborne anti-tank elements as a lightweight support weapon capable of engaging armour, fortifications, and infantry positions. Refurbishment programme "Khanyisa" later restored safety to remaining systems for reserve and emergency-support roles. The weapon fires 105 mm ammunition with an effective direct-fire range of approximately 1,200 m. |

=== MANPADS ===
| Name | Origin | Type | Warhead | Image | Details |
|---|---|---|---|---|---|
| Starstreak | United Kingdom | MANPADS | 3 darts of 22 mm | | Very short-range air-defence (VSHORAD) missile system introduced to provide the South African Army with a modern mobile air-defence capability against low-flying aircraft and helicopters. Operated by the Air Defence Artillery Formation in both shoulder-launched and Lightweight Multiple Launcher (LML) configurations for the protection of critical installations and mobile ground forces. The missile system has an operational range of approximately 6 km and is capable of engaging high-speed aerial targets using laser beam-riding guidance technology. |

=== Explosives ===
| Name | Origin | Type | Image | Details |
|---|---|---|---|---|
| M26 | South Africa | Fragmentation hand grenade | | Standard fragmentation hand grenade licensed and locally produced by Rheinmetall Denel Munitions and issued as the South African Army's principal infantry grenade for close-range combat and area suppression operations. Operates using a pyrotechnic timed fuze with an approximate 4.5-second delay for controlled detonation. Primarily employed for trench clearing, bunker assaults, room clearing, and close-range anti-personnel engagements. |
| RDM Grenade | South Africa | Illuminating hand grenade | | Pyrotechnic illumination grenade used by the South African Army to provide temporary battlefield lighting during night operations, reconnaissance tasks, and target identification. Primarily employed for battlefield illumination, area marking, night manoeuvre, and support during low-light operations. |
| M1A1 | South Africa | Flashbang | | Stun grenade used by the South African Army and Military Police for tactical entry, room-clearing, and riot-control operations. Utilises a pyrotechnic timed fuze with an approximate 1.5-second delay. The grenade provides a non-lethal tactical option designed to maximise sensory and psychological disruption while reducing the risk of permanent injury. |
| M83 | South Africa | Smoke grenade | | Smoke grenade used by the South African Army for concealment, signalling, training, and battlefield screening operations. Consists of a cylindrical tinplate body containing a smoke-generating pyrotechnic composition. Utilises a fly-off lever ignition system with a pyrotechnic delay mechanism, safety pin, and pull ring. |
| MS-803 | South Africa | Anti-personnel mine | | South African directional anti-personnel fragmentation mine based on the design of the American M18A1 Claymore and intended for defensive ambush, perimeter security, and area-denial operations. Capable of projecting a fan-shaped fragmentation pattern with an effective lethal radius of up to 50 metres in a 60° arc. The system is mounted on a folding scissor stand with an integrated aiming groove for directional placement. A number of MS-803 mines reportedly remain in SANDF stockpiles and are primarily used for training purposes. |

== Personal equipment ==
=== Protective equipment ===
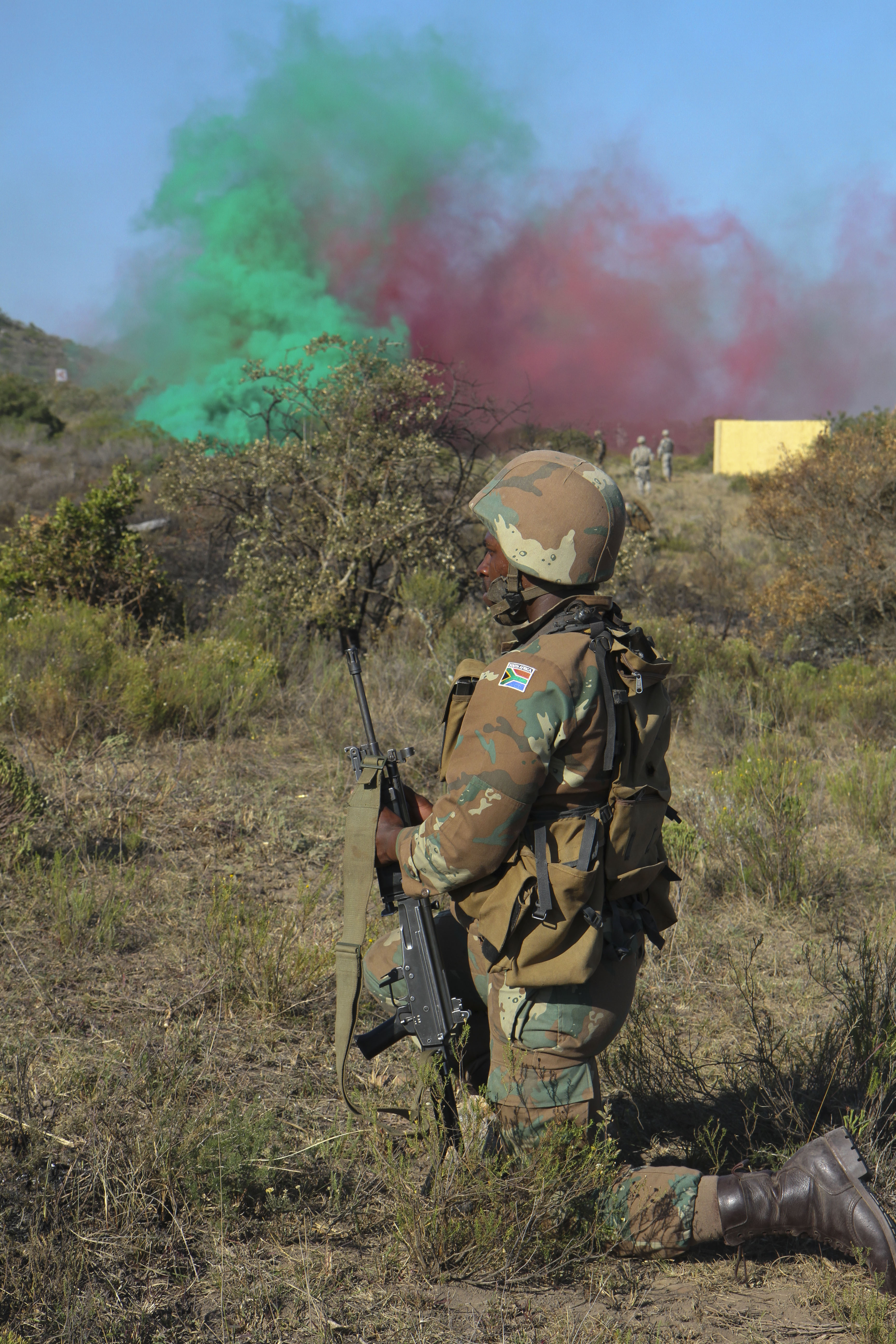
A soldier seen equipped with the standard Soldier 2000 uniform and M87 Kevlar combat helmet

South African Army personnel are equipped with a wide variety of combat helmets and body armour systems designed for conventional warfare, counter-insurgency operations, peacekeeping deployments, and long-range field operations.

==== Combat helmets ====
The standard combat helmets used by the South African Army are the locally produced M87 Kevlar helmet, introduced in 1989 for conventional army formations, and the older M83 Kevlar helmet derived from the Israeli OR-201 design and widely associated with airborne forces. Both helmets provide significant fragmentation and ballistic protection while maintaining relatively low weight for extended field operations.

Modern VIPER-series ballistic helmets manufactured by the South African company Zebra Protection have also increasingly been observed in service with army personnel during internal security operations and peacekeeping deployments. The helmets are modern MICH- and FAST-style designs typically fitted with Soldier 2000 camouflage covers and accessory mounting systems. Although sightings have increased in recent years, it remains unclear whether the helmets have been formally adopted for widespread standard issue.

==== Body armour ====
South African Army personnel are issued fragmentation and ballistic body armour systems intended to protect against shrapnel, battlefield debris, and small-arms fire during combat operations. Most configurations consist of soft-armour fragmentation vests combined with plate carriers fitted with ceramic ballistic plates for improved rifle-threat protection.

Current armour systems are generally produced in camouflage patterns matching the Soldier 2000 uniform system and are commonly worn externally over combat dress. The army has also reportedly explored newer modular ballistic vest systems as part of wider infantry modernisation efforts.

=== Uniforms ===
==== Combat clothing ====
The standard combat uniform of the South African Army is the Soldier 2000 camouflage pattern, officially adopted in 1994 and developed by the Council for Scientific and Industrial Research (CSIR). The pattern was designed specifically for South Africa's bushveld, savannah, woodland, and semi-arid environments and remains the principal combat uniform of the SANDF.

Combat clothing systems include various combat jackets, trousers, boots, boonie hats, patrol caps, cold-weather layers, and other field equipment used during conventional and peacekeeping operations. Reconnaissance, airborne, and special forces personnel have increasingly utilised lightweight and flame-resistant tactical uniforms during operational deployments.

=== Load-carrying equipment ===
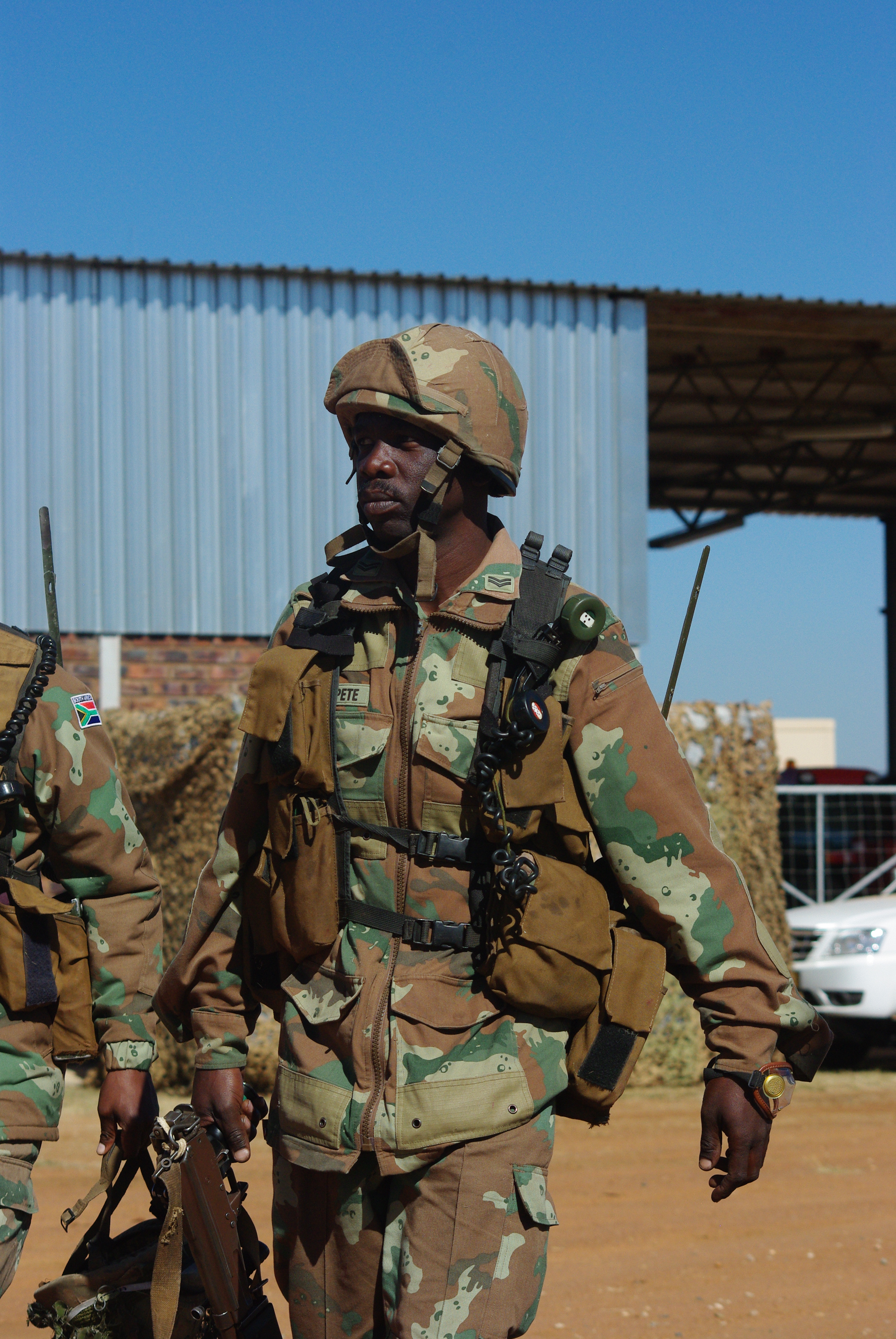
Air-assault infantry soldier equipped with an M83 Kevlar helmet and the standard Pattern 83 tactical webbing system

South African infantry equipment has historically prioritised mobility, endurance, and long-range operations in African terrain.

==== Tactical webbing systems ====
- Pattern 83 Battle Jacket — Assault vest and chest-rig system developed during the Border War for infantry and bush warfare operations.
- Pattern 83 Chest Rig — Lightweight load-bearing system designed to carry magazines, grenades, radios, water bottles, and patrol equipment during long-range operations.
- Pattern 83 Assault Pack — Medium-sized field pack developed for reconnaissance patrols, airborne deployments, and extended field operations.

=== Vision systems ===
The South African Army has increasingly invested in modern night-vision and thermal imaging systems to improve battlefield awareness and operational effectiveness during low-light and all-weather conditions.

==== Night-vision ====
The MNVM-14 is the standard night-vision monocular introduced into service around 2010 and is comparable in capability and design to the American AN/PVS-14. Features include;

- Single image-intensifier tube providing passive low-light vision capability.
- Compact modular design capable of being used as a hand-held, weapon-mounted, or helmet-mounted system.
- Compatible with optional 3× and 5× afocal magnifier lenses for extended observation capability.
- Can be configured as a dual-tube binocular system using specialised helmet mounts.

Primarily used by specialised infantry units during night operations, including the army's elite 44 Parachute Regiment and 44 Pathfinder Platoon, for night-time infiltration, parachute insertion, reconnaissance, and drop-zone marking.

==== Thermal imaging ====
The Thales SOPHIE is a high-performance thermal imaging and electro-optical observation system acquired under Project Cytoon in 2012 for tactical surveillance and target acquisition roles. It provides day-night and all-weather imaging capability, significantly enhancing target identification and battlefield observation. Features include;

- Detection ranges of approximately 4 km+ for personnel, 10 km for tanks, 12 km for helicopters, and up to 16 km for fast jets (depending on environmental conditions)
- Stabilised optical system for improved long-range observation accuracy
- Configurable for tripod, mast, or vehicle-mounted deployment

The system is primarily operated by the tactical intelligence corps and is used to support surveillance, target identification, and observation missions in complex operational environments.

=== Man-portable radars ===
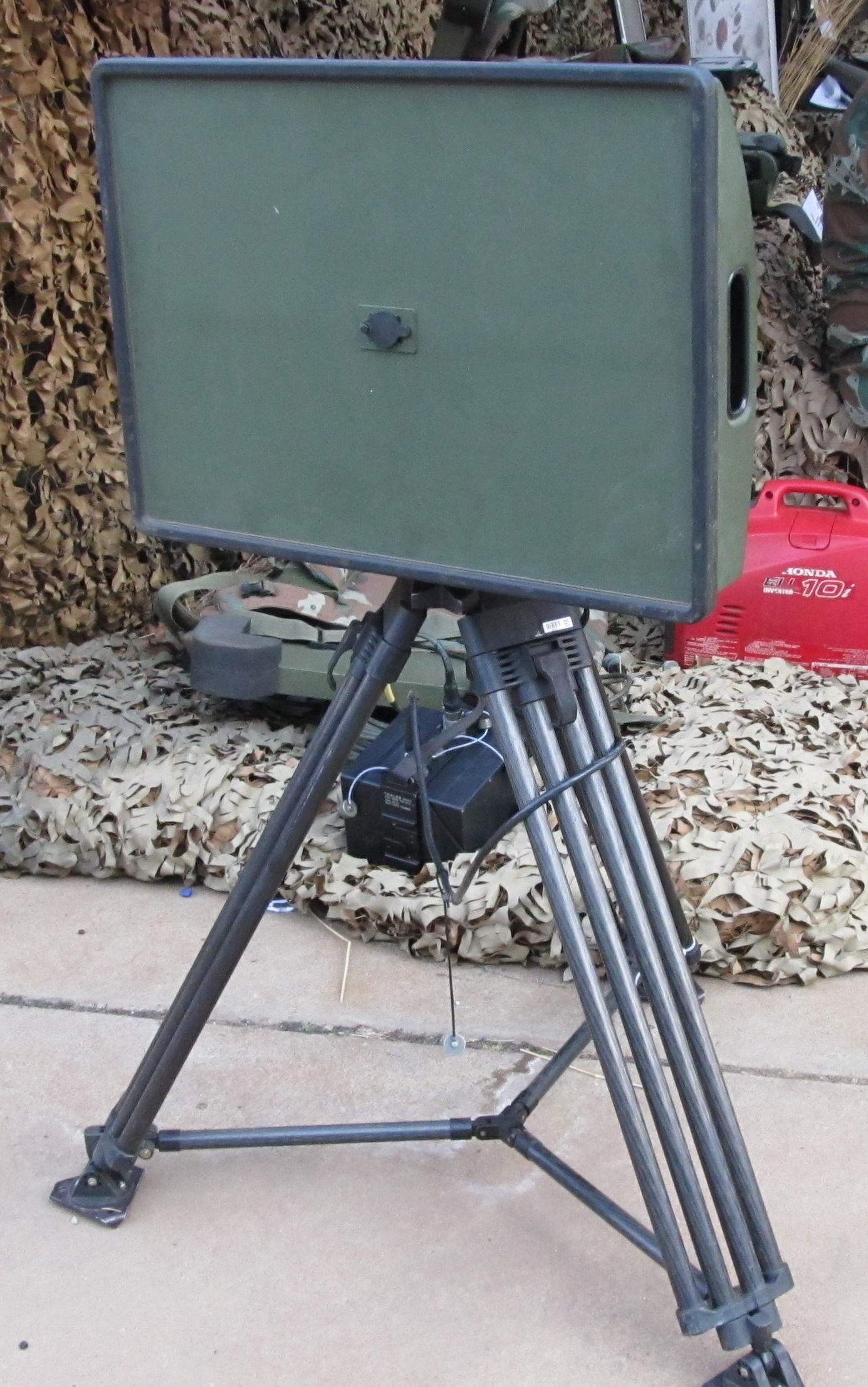
A Thales Squire battlefield surveillance radar of the South African Army

The Thales SQUIRE is a man-portable battlefield surveillance radar acquired under Project Cytoon in 2012 for dismounted reconnaissance and tactical surveillance operations. It provides long-range detection of ground and low-altitude aerial targets while maintaining a low probability of intercept signature. Features include;

- Detection ranges of approximately 10 km for personnel, 21 km for vehicles, 28 km for tanks, 21 km for helicopters, and up to 48 km for naval targets depending on size and profile
- FMCW Doppler radar with moving-target indication and advanced clutter rejection processing
- Man-portable configuration deployable on tripod, mast, or vehicle mount for tactical flexibility

The system is used by the tactical intelligence corps to extend situational awareness, enhance early warning capability, and support force protection and reconnaissance operations.

=== Communications equipment ===
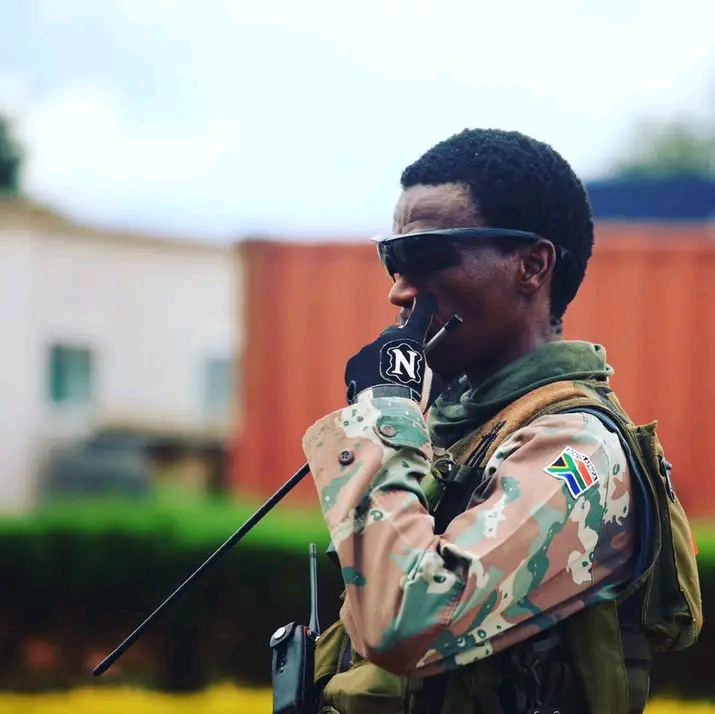
South African Army radio operator with tactical communications equipment during deployment

The SANDF is modernising its battlefield communications network under Project Radiate, a programme intended to replace ageing analogue radio systems with locally developed software-defined Combat Net Radios (CNRs) manufactured by Reutech Communications. The programme aims to standardise communications across all SANDF branches including the South African Army while improving interoperability, encryption, battlefield situational awareness, and secure digital communications capability.

==== Radio systems ====
- PCR4001 — UHF personal role radio used for short-range infantry communications.
- MCR1025 — HF manpack radio designed for long-range communications.
- MCR2005 — VHF manpack combat radio used for infantry and ground operations.
- MCR3005 — V/UHF manpack radio primarily intended for ground-to-air communications.
- VCR2050 / VCR3020 — Vehicle-mounted VHF and UHF combat radios.
- VCR1100 / FCR1100 — HF vehicle-mounted and fixed-installation communications systems.

Project Radiate replaces several known legacy systems previously used by the SANDF, including the A53 and A55 manpack radios, B56 and B57 vehicle-mounted radios, and the later Reutech C21 HF radio family. Although mass production reportedly commenced in 2013, large-scale operational deployment only began during the 2020s as the SANDF gradually transitions to the new communications network.

== Combat vehicles ==
The exact number of active combat vehicles is not publicly disclosed, although open-source estimates provide an indication of fleet strength. In August 2025, a parliamentary report stated that current inventories are estimated to include over 500 Ratel infantry fighting vehicles (Ratel 20, Ratel 60, and Ratel 90) in active service, with an additional estimated 600 vehicles held in storage. Approximately 170 Rooikat armoured reconnaissance vehicles and just over 200 Olifant main battle tanks are also believed to remain on the Army asset register.

The protected mobility fleet is estimated to include around 300 active Casspir MRAPs, with over 1,000 additional vehicles reportedly retained in storage, alongside approximately 200–300 active Mamba APCs and a further estimated 400–450 vehicles in storage. Many of these protected mobility platforms have undergone refurbishment and life-extension work over time, with significant numbers of Casspirs and Mambas restored from storage and returned to active service.

To address modernisation shortfalls, the South African Army has recently placed orders for 244 Badger infantry fighting vehicles under Project Hoefyster, valued at approximately R8.4 billion, while a separate R500 million contract approved the acquisition of nearly 500 new Milkor 4x4 MRAPs intended to supplement older protected mobility platforms.

=== Main battle tanks ===
| Name | Origin | Type | Number | Image | Details |
|---|---|---|---|---|---|
| Olifant | United Kingdom South Africa | MBT Main battle tank | ~ 266 acquired ~ 203 retained (2026 est.) | Challenger 2 | The Olifant (Afrikaans for: Elephant) is a heavily upgraded and modernised Centurion-based main battle tank. It equips one regular and three reserve regiments of the South African Armoured Corps.: Olifant Mk1A (133) – Early upgraded model of the British Centurion, mostly kept in storage; Olifant Mk1B (44) – Newer version fitted with a rebuilt chassis, enhanced armour protection, improved mobility, and upgraded onboard systems; Olifant Mk2 (26) – Most advanced operational variant fitted with upgraded fire-control systems, thermal sights, and improved sensors, effectively an improved Mk1B; A total of 266 Olifants were acquired, these include 16 armoured bridge layers and two armoured recovery vehicles. During the post-apartheid downsizing of the army, a small number of older models were withdrawn from service and scrapped in order to reduce operating costs. The type is expected to be replaced sometime in the near future under Project Aorta. |

=== Armoured reconnaissance ===
| Name | Origin | Type | Number | Image | Details |
|---|---|---|---|---|---|
| Rooikat | South Africa | CRV Combat reconnaissance vehicle | ~ 242 acquired ~ 174 retained (2026 est.) | | The Rooikat (Afrikaans for: Caracal) is a fast 8-wheeled armoured fighting vehicle and tank destroyer developed for long-range reconnaissance, anti-armour operations, and rapid manoeuvre warfare. It equips the armoured car regiments of the Armoured Corps.: Rooikat Mk1A – Initial production model; Rooikat Mk1B – Improved fire-control and mobility systems; Rooikat Mk1C – Upgraded protection and onboard systems; Rooikat Mk1D – Final operational standard fitted with a new engine and improved sensors; A total of 242 Rooikats were taken into service. As of 2026, about 174 vehicles reportedly remain in service or reserve. Multiple upgrade programmes later brought many stored vehicles up to the Mk1D standard in order to extend the operational life of the fleet. |

=== Infantry fighting vehicles ===
| Name | Origin | Type | Quantity | Image | Details |
|---|---|---|---|---|---|
| Ratel IFV | South Africa | IFV Infantry fighting vehicle | ~ 1,400 acquired ~ 1,186 retained (2026 est.) | Ratel IFV (1,134): Ratel 20 Ratel Command Ratel 30 Ratel 90 Ratel ZT-3 (52): | The Ratel is a six-wheeled infantry fighting vehicle developed for mobility, firepower, and long-range operations. It remains the principal armoured fighting vehicle of the army's mechanised infantry battalions.: Ratel 20 – Main variant armed with a 20 mm autocannon and roof-mounted MILAN anti-tank guided missile launcher; Ratel 30 – Upgraded variant fitted with a 30 mm tactical remote turret; Ratel 60 – 60 mm gun-mortar fire-support variant; Ratel 81 – 81 mm long-range mortar carrier; Ratel 90 – Fire-support variant armed with a 90 mm GT-2 low-velocity cannon; Ratel Command – Command and control variant fitted with a .50 calibre machine gun; Ratel ZT-3 – ZT3 Ingwe anti-tank missile carrier operated by the armoured corps; Approximately 1,400 Ratels in all variants were delivered, in addition to 52 Ratel ZT-3 tank destroyers. As of 2026, around 550 vehicles reportedly remain in regular service, while a further 636 are retained in reserve battalions or storage. |
| Badger IFV | Finland South Africa | IFV Infantry fighting vehicle | ~ 22 acquired ~ 222 more on order | | The Badger is an 8-wheeled infantry fighting vehicle developed under Project Hoefyster through joint Finnish and South African development. It is intended to replace portions of the army's ageing Ratel fleet with a new generation of mechanised combat vehicles.: Infantry combat vehicle – Main infantry fighting variant armed with a 30 mm cannon; Fire support vehicle – Fire-support variant armed with a 30 mm cannon and anti-tank guided missiles; Self-propelled mortar – Fitted with a 60 mm gun-mortar system; Command vehicle – Command and control variant equipped with advanced communications systems; Tank destroyer – Anti-armour variant fitted with dual anti-tank guided missile launchers; Ambulance vehicle – Protected battlefield medical evacuation variant; The army originally planned to acquire around 264 vehicles, although the order was later reduced due to budget limitations before stabilising at approximately 244 vehicles. Around 22 pre-production vehicles were delivered from Finland, while the remaining vehicles were intended for local production by Denel Land Systems. As of 2026, the programme remained stalled pending additional government funding to restart production. |

=== Protected mobility vehicles ===
| Name | Origin | Type | Number | Image | Details |
|---|---|---|---|---|---|
| Mamba MK-2 | South Africa | Infantry mobility vehicle MRAP Mine-resistant ambush protected | 330–380 | | The Mamba is a mine-resistant armoured personnel carrier with MRAP capabilities, providing significant protection against anti-tank mines, improvised explosive devices, and small-arms fire. It serves alongside the Casspir with motorised infantry units in troop transport, patrol, and internal security operations in high-threat environments.: Mamba Mk2 – Standard production variant armed with either a .50 calibre M2 Browning or 40 mm Denel Y3 grenade machine gun; Mamba Mk3 – Improved version fitted with upgraded armour protection and onboard systems; Around 800 Mambas were delivered to the army, with a number of vehicles later sold to foreign operators. As of 2026, roughly 550–600 vehicles reportedly remain in active service or reserve. During the 2000s, about 220 Mk2 vehicles were upgraded to the Mk3 standard under Project Jury, while additional Mk2 vehicles were later refurbished from storage and returned to operational service after being upgraded to Mk3. In 2022, the CSIR also developed a protected turret system for peacekeeping operations in order to improve crew protection. |
| Mamba MK-3 | South Africa | Infantry mobility vehicle MRAP Mine-resistant ambush protected | ~ 220 | | |
| Casspir | South Africa | Infantry mobility vehicle MRAP Mine-resistant ambush protected | ~ 2,800 acquired ~ 2,000 retained (2026 est.) | | The Casspir is a heavy mine-resistant infantry mobility vehicle designed to protect troops against anti-tank mines, improvised explosive devices, and small-arms fire. It serves with motorised infantry units in troop transport, patrol, convoy escort, peacekeeping, and internal security roles.: Casspir APC – Standard troop carrier armed with either a .50 calibre M2 Browning, 40 mm Denel Y3 grenade machine gun, or several 7.62 mm SS-77 machine guns; Mortar Carrier – Equipped to operate an 81 mm mortar; Recoilless Gun Vehicle – Armed with a 105 mm recoilless rifle for direct fire support; Ambulance Vehicle – Medical evacuation variant; Fire Support Team Vehicle (FISTV) – Operated by forward observers and fire-support teams; Artillery Fire Control Vehicle – Used for artillery coordination and battlefield command; Plofadder Mine-Clearing Vehicle – Mine-clearing variant fitted with the Plofadder system; Recovery Vehicle – Recovery and engineering support variant; Around 2,800 Casspirs in all variants were delivered, including vehicles later transferred to the SAPS. As of 2026, about 2,000 vehicles reportedly remain in inventory after international sales, although most are older models held in storage pending reactivation and refurbishment. DefenceWeb reported that around 350–370 upgraded Casspir Mk3 vehicles remain in active service under Project Gijima, while additional stored vehicles have periodically undergone refurbishment and return to operational service in recent years. |
| MILKOR 4x4 | South Africa | Infantry mobility vehicle MRAP Mine-resistant ambush protected | ~ 462 ordered (2026 est.) | | A procurement programme intended to improve protected mobility for border safeguarding and internal security operations aimed at modernising the army's vehicle fleet with heavier and more militarised platforms while reducing reliance on soft-skinned utility vehicles in frontline border patrol roles like Toyota Land Cruiser.: Section variant (+210) – Troop transport variant for border safeguarding and patrol operations, likely to be fitted with a remote-controlled weapon station; Command variant (+144) – Fitted with communications and battlefield management systems for command and control roles, likely to be fitted with a remote-controlled weapon station; Ambulance variant (+108) – Protected battlefield medical evacuation variant; In 2025, Milkor was awarded the contract to supply the new generation of mine-resistant armoured personnel carriers to the army. An initial batch of nearly 500 vehicles is expected to be acquired between 2027 and 2029. |
| SVI MAX 3 | South Africa | Infantry mobility vehicle MRAP Mine-resistant ambush protected | 6 delivered (2024 est.) | | The SVI MAX 3 is an infantry mobility vehicle with limited MRAP capabilities developed for border safeguarding and internal security operations. It serves as a more survivable successor to the ageing Toyota Land Cruiser troop carriers used in frontline patrol duties. In early 2024, the SANDF received six MAX 3 vehicles for Operation Corona under the Joint Operations Division in order to improve border patrol capability. Two vehicles were delivered in a 4×4 configuration, while the remaining four were larger 6×6 variants fitted with rear cargo cabins. Future acquisition numbers remain unclear, although the type forms part of wider efforts to replace approximately 435 Toyota Land Cruiser troop carriers with more survivable protected mobility vehicles. |
| RG-31 Nyala | South Africa | Infantry mobility vehicle MRAP Mine-resistant ambush protected | Unknown | | The RG-31 Nyala is a mine-resistant infantry mobility vehicle used for troop transport, patrol, convoy escort, and internal security operations.: RG-31 Mk5E – Variant fitted with a 20 mm remote-controlled weapon station and optional 40 mm Denel Y3 grenade machine gun; The Mk5E type has been observed in limited army service during official demonstrations, confirming its operational use. |

== Artillery ==
=== Rocket artillery ===
| Name | Origin | Type | Number | Image | Details |
|---|---|---|---|---|---|
| Bateleur | South Africa | MLRS Multiple launch rocket system (127 mm) | ~ 25 acquired ~ 25 retained (2026 est.) | | The Bateleur FV2 is the standard 127 mm multiple-launch rocket system (MLRS) in service with the South African Army Artillery Formation, providing mobile area-saturation fire support for corps- and divisional-level operations. The system is mounted on an armoured mine-resistant Samil 100 6×6 truck chassis, allowing rapid shoot-and-scoot deployment to reduce vulnerability to counter-battery fire.: Calibre: 127 mm rockets; Barrels: 40 vehicle-mounted launch tubes; Range: Approximately 36–40 km depending on rocket type; Mobility: Armoured Samil 100 MPV 6×6 truck chassis; Approximately 25 systems remain in South African service. Under Project Topstar, the Bateleur is undergoing upgrades focused on improved digital fire-control systems, target acquisition capability, and future range-extension developments. |
| Valkiri | South Africa | MLRS Multiple launch rocket system (127 mm) | ~ 26 acquired ~ 26 retained (2026 est.) | | The Valkiri FV1 is a 127 mm multiple-launch rocket system designed to provide rapid area-saturation fire support for ground forces. The system is typically mounted on a modified Unimog truck chassis and served as the Army's primary rocket artillery system prior to the introduction of the Bateleur.: Calibre: 127 mm rockets; Barrels: 24 vehicle-mounted launch tubes; Range: Approximately 36–40 km depending on rocket type; Mobility: Modified Unimog-type truck chassis; A limited number are believed to remain in training and contingency roles, while it remains unclear whether the type is included in the Project Topstar modernisation programme. |
| RO 107 | China South Africa | MLRS Multiple launch rocket system (107 mm) | Unknown | | The RO 107 is a lightweight 107 mm multiple-launch rocket system (MLRS) of Chinese origin captured by the former SADF during the Border War in Angola. The system provided infantry and special operations units with a highly mobile short-range saturation fire capability and was later locally adapted for continued South African service.: Calibre: 107 mm rockets; Barrels: Typically 12 launch tubes per launcher; Range: Approximately 6–10 km depending on rocket type; Mobility: Mounted on a specialised Mamba APC chassis for rapid deployment; Following capture during the Border War, South African industry reportedly produced improved local rocket variants and adapted launchers for vehicle and tripod-mounted use to improve tactical mobility. |

=== Self-propelled artillery ===
| Name | Origin | Type | Number | Image | Details |
|---|---|---|---|---|---|
| G6 Rhino | South Africa | SPH Self propelled howitzer (155 mm) | ~ 153 acquired ~ 43 retained (2026 est.) | | The G6 Rhino is the standard 155 mm self-propelled howitzer of the South African Army Artillery Formation. Mounted on a heavily armoured, mine-resistant 6 x 6 wheeled chassis, it is widely known for its exceptional range, including a world-record long-range firing capability. The G6 provides highly mobile, long-range fire support for corps- and divisional-level operations, combining strategic reach with battlefield mobility and survivability.: Calibre: 155 mm (L/45); Range: Approximately 30 km with standard high-explosive (HE) ammunition and up to 76 km with extended-range projectiles depending on ammunition type; Mobility: Armoured mine-resistant 6×6 self-propelled chassis; A total of 153 systems were originally acquired, although international sales later reduced the fleet to approximately 43 vehicles. Under Project Muhali, a number of G6-45 systems are being upgraded with improved sensors, range, accuracy, and digital fire-control systems based on the G6-52 design. |
| T5-52 | South Africa | SPH Self propelled howitzer (155 mm) | Several in operational use | | The T5-52 is a South African truck-mounted 155 mm self-propelled howitzer introduced into limited service during 2018. The system combines the long-range firepower of the G5-52 family with a high-mobility truck platform designed for rapid deployment and shoot-and-scoot operations.: Calibre: 155 mm (L/52); Range: Approximately 30 km with standard high-explosive (HE) ammunition and up to 60 km with extended-range projectiles depending on ammunition type; Mobility: High-mobility truck-mounted self-propelled chassis; The T5-52 entered limited service partly to offset the sale of three G5 howitzers and to provide a more expeditionary artillery capability. Further acquisition remains dependent on funding approvals and the completion of an upgraded production-standard variant. |

=== Towed artillery ===
| Name | Origin | Type | Number | Image | Details |
|---|---|---|---|---|---|
| G5 Leopard | South Africa | Towed howitzer (155 mm) | ~ 75 acquired ~ 72 retained (2026 est.) | | The G5 Leopard is a long-range 155 mm towed howitzer and serves as the standard towed artillery system of the South African Army Artillery Formation. Designed for corps- and divisional-level fire support, the G5 combines long-range capability with strong ballistic performance and has been widely exported internationally.: Calibre: 155 mm (L/45); Range: Approximately 30 km with standard high-explosive (HE) ammunition and up to 55 km with extended-range projectiles depending on ammunition type; Mobility: Towed heavy artillery system requiring a prime mover for redeployment; Up to 520 systems were reportedly produced, with approximately 75 accepted into South African service. Under Project Topstar, active G5 systems are undergoing upgrades based on the G5-52 configuration with improvements to sensors, range, and fire-control capability. |
| G4 Howitzer | Israel | Towed howitzer (155 mm) | ~ 32 | | The G4 is a long-range 155 mm towed howitzer introduced into South African service during the 1980s under Project Burrow. Based on the Israeli Soltam M-71 design, the G4 provided corps-level fire support during the Border War before being superseded by the newer G5 Leopard.: Calibre: 155 mm (L/39); Range: Approximately 20–24 km with standard ammunition depending on charge and projectile type; Mobility: Towed heavy artillery system requiring a prime mover for redeployment; A total of 32 systems were reportedly acquired during the 1980s. The G4 has since been withdrawn from frontline service and largely retained in reserve storage alongside other legacy artillery systems. |
| G2 Howitzer | United Kingdom | Towed howitzer (140 mm) | ~ 75 | | The G2 is the South African designation for the British BL 5.5-inch medium gun, a legacy towed artillery system extensively used by the SADF during the early stages of the Border War, including Operation Savannah.: Calibre: Approximately 140 mm (5.5-inch); Range: Approximately 16–18 km depending on ammunition type; Mobility: Towed medium artillery system requiring a prime mover for redeployment; The G2 formerly served as part of the South African Army's medium artillery capability before being superseded by newer 155 mm systems such as the G5 and G6. Approximately 75 guns are reportedly retained in reserve storage and are no longer used in frontline service. |
| G1 Howitzer | United Kingdom | Towed howitzer (87 mm) | ~ 30 | | The G1 is the South African designation for the British QF 25-pounder field gun/howitzer, a versatile dual-purpose artillery system widely used by Commonwealth forces during the mid-20th century.: Calibre: Approximately 87.6 mm (25-pound shell); Range: Approximately 11–13 km depending on ammunition and propellant charge; Mobility: Towed field gun/howitzer requiring a prime mover for redeployment; The G1 is no longer used as an operational frontline artillery system but remains in ceremonial service with reserve regiments including the Cape Field Artillery and the Transvaal Horse Artillery. |

=== Mortars ===
| Name | Origin | Type | Number | Image | Details |
|---|---|---|---|---|---|
| M5 Mortar | Israel United States | 120mm heavy mortar | ~ 36 | | 120 mm heavy mortar and the standard heavy indirect-fire support weapon of the South African Army, serving as the principal mortar system of the Steve Biko Artillery Regiment. It provides battalion-level fire support with high-explosive, illumination, and smoke munitions, and is designed for rapid deployment in both conventional and expeditionary operations. Operated by a four-man crew, the mortar is typically deployed in ground-emplaced configurations using a baseplate and bipod system, and can also be air-transported for rapid insertion with airborne or mobile formations. High-explosive (HE), smoke, illumination, and practice rounds can be fired to an effective range of approximately 7–9 km depending on ammunition type and propellant charge, with performance varying according to round and firing conditions. |
| M3 Mortar | France South Africa | 81mm medium mortar | ~ 1,190 | | Developed locally from the French LLR 81 mm mortar design with modifications for SANDF operational requirements. It serves as the standard company-level indirect fire support weapon of the South African Army Infantry Formation. Operated by a three- or four-man crew, the mortar is commonly deployed in ground-mounted and vehicle-mounted configurations, including the Ratel 81 mortar carrier variant, to provide mobile organic fire support for infantry formations. HE, smoke, illumination, and practice rounds can be fired to an effective range of approximately 5.6 km depending on ammunition type and propellant charge. |
| M1 Mortar | South Africa | 60mm light mortar | Unknown | | Light infantry mortar used as an organic close-support indirect-fire weapon for airborne, light infantry, and special forces formations. It is designed for rapid emplacement and immediate fire support at short ranges. HE, smoke, illumination, and practice rounds (M-61 series) can be fired to an effective range of approximately 1.5 km depending on ammunition and charge. The M1 underwent an upgrade programme in 2016 to improve range and accuracy and remains in active service. |
| M4 Mortar | South Africa | 60mm light mortar | Unknown | | 60 mm light patrol mortar optimised for rapid deployment and high-mobility operations. It shares ammunition compatibility with the M1 family and is designed to reduce emplacement time compared to conventional tripod-mounted mortars. HE, smoke, illumination, and practice rounds (M-61 series) can be fired to an effective range of approximately 1.8 km depending on ammunition type and propellant charge. |
| M6 Mortar | South Africa | 60mm light mortar | ~ 102+ | | Lightweight long-range 60 mm mortar acquired under Project Acrobat to provide the army with a rapidly deployable light-mortar capability for airborne and motorised infantry forces. Its design prioritises low weight, extended range, and ease of employment in expeditionary operations. Operated by a two- to three-man crew, the system is designed for man-portable use as well as airborne and vehicle-mounted deployment HE, smoke, illumination, and practice rounds can be fired to an effective range of approximately 6.1 km depending on ammunition type and propellant charge. Around 102 units were delivered from 2011, although current in-service numbers remain subject to official confirmation. |

== Air defence ==
=== Surface-to-air missile systems ===
| Name | Origin | Type | Range | Image | Details |
|---|---|---|---|---|---|
| Starstreak LML | United Kingdom | VSHORAD SAM Very short-range air defence, surface-to-air missile system | 7 km (4.35 nmi) | | The Starstreak LML is a British very short-range air-defence (VSHORAD) missile system acquired by the South African Army under the Ground-Based Air Defence System (GBADS / Project Guardian) Phase I programme. It provides point-defence capability against low-flying aircraft and unmanned aerial threats.: Guidance: Laser beam-riding guidance system requiring continuous operator tracking; Range: Approximately 7 km depending on target profile and engagement conditions; Sensors: Thales Page continuous-wave radar (~20 km detection range) used for target acquisition and tracking support; The system is operated by the Air Defence Artillery Formation using Lightweight Multiple Launcher (LML) units and associated radar support elements. It entered service following extended testing and integration during the late 2000s and early 2010s. |
| Umkhonto | South Africa | MRAD SAM Medium-range air defence, surface-to-air missile system | 20 km (10.8 nmi) | | The Umkhonto (Zulu for: Spear) is a South African short-to-medium range surface-to-air missile system developed by Denel Dynamics as part of the Ground-Based Air Defence System (GBADS) programme. The ground-based variant is currently undergoing testing with the Air Defence Artillery Formation and is expected to be procured in larger numbers in future service.: Guidance: Infrared homing terminal guidance with automated command-and-control support; Range: Up to approximately 20 km depending on variant, with extended-range versions in development; Sensors: Reutech RSR 320 radar system (~80 km detection range) used for target acquisition, tracking, and fire-control coordination; The system consists of mobile 8- or 16-cell Umkhonto-IR launcher modules mounted on a Cavallo truck chassis, integrated with radar and command-and-control systems to provide 360° engagement capability and multi-target tracking. |

=== Anti-aircraft guns ===
| Name | Origin | Type | Number | Image | Details |
|---|---|---|---|---|---|
| Oerlikon GDF | Switzerland Germany | Radar-guided 35 mm anti-aircraft autocannon | ~ 169 acquired ~ 48 retained (2026 est.) | | The Oerlikon GDF is a Swiss-designed twin-barrel 35 mm anti-aircraft autocannon system operated by the Air Defence Artillery Formation. It provides short-to-medium range point-defence against aircraft, helicopters, and unmanned aerial systems, forming part of the Army's layered air-defence network.: Calibre: 35 mm (twin-barrel system); Ammunition: 35 mm conventional rounds and programmable AHEAD ammunition (following modernisation); Mobility: Towed and semi-static deployment on field carriages for point defence of key installations and manoeuvre formations; Sensors: Originally paired with Super Fledermaus fire-control units and later LPD-20 radars; modernised systems integrate advanced Skyshield radar and electro-optical tracking; Originally 169 systems were acquired. During the 1990s, 48 Mk I guns were upgraded to Mk V standard, and by 2017 these Mk V systems had subsequently been modernised to Mk VII Skyshield standard as part of Project Protector. The upgrades integrated modern radar and fire-control systems, significantly improving effectiveness against fast, low-altitude, and manoeuvring targets. |
| ZU-23-2 Zumlac | Soviet Union South Africa | SPAAG 23 mm self-propelled anti-air gun | ~ 36 | | The Bosvark or Zumlac is a South African self-propelled anti-aircraft gun (SPAAG) developed in the late 1990s to provide mobile short-range air-defence and convoy protection. It combines twin 23 mm autocannons with a mine-protected truck chassis, producing a rugged, road-mobile point-defence platform suited to South African operational requirements.: Calibre: Twin 23 mm autocannons (ZU-23-2 barrels captured during operations in Angola); Ammunition: 23 mm conventional anti-aircraft rounds for short-range air-defence and convoy protection; Mobility: Armoured Samil 100 6×6 mine-protected vehicle (MPV) providing road mobility and blast survivability; Sensors: Electro-optical sights and manual optical targeting systems; no standardised radar fire-control system fitted across all units; Approximately 36 units are reported to be in service. The Bosvark is a locally adapted system prioritising mobility and survivability over advanced sensor integration, and remains a niche but functional short-range air-defence platform. |

=== Mobile radar and fire control systems ===
| Name | Origin | Type | Number | Image | Details |
|---|---|---|---|---|---|
| ESR 220 | South Africa | Mobile battery fire control post and surveillance early warning radar | ~ 4 | | The ESR 220 Thutlwa is a South African-developed mobile L-band 2D surveillance radar built by Reutech Radar Systems. It evolved from earlier Project Bioskoop and HEXAGON/Kameelperd development programmes and is intended to provide early warning, air surveillance, and battery-level fire-control support for Ground-Based Air Defence (GBADS) formations.: Range & Tracking: Detects and tracks up to approximately 100 targets simultaneously, with a maximum detection range of around 120 km; Frequency: L-band solid-state 2D surveillance radar with integrated IFF and command-and-control interfaces (Link-ZA compatible); Mobility: Mounted on an armoured 8×8 Skimmel truck chassis with onboard power generation; deployed and operational in roughly 10 minutes; The ESR 220 Thutlwa forms a core component of South Africa's GBADS sensor network, providing local air surveillance, target cueing, and fire-control support for coordinated short-range air-defence operations at battery and regimental level. |
| Super Fledermaus | Switzerland | Mobile pulse-radar and fire control system | ~ 75 | | The Super Fledermaus is a Swiss-designed short-range X-band fire-control radar originally developed by Oerlikon Contraves for gun-based air-defence systems. It was introduced into South African service in the late 1960s and served as the primary fire-control radar for 35 mm GDF anti-aircraft gun batteries.: Range & Tracking: Effective detection range of ~15 km against low-altitude aircraft; tracking range of ~10 km with capability to control engagements against up to two targets; Frequency: X-band pulse-Doppler fire-control radar with integrated IFF Mk X and automated gun-laying computation; Mobility: Towed or vehicle-supported deployment for battery-level air-defence integration; The Super Fledermaus served as South Africa's first modern radar-directed gun fire-control system and formed the backbone of Air Defence Artillery operations for several decades before being gradually replaced by modern Skyshield-based systems. |
| LPD-20 | Italy | Mobile early-warning radar and fire control system | Unknown | | The LPD-20 is a short-range mobile battlefield search and acquisition radar used for low-altitude air-defence target detection and fire-control support. It provides local warning and cueing for gun and missile air-defence systems in GBADS-type deployments.: Range & Tracking: Detection range of approximately ~20 km depending on target profile; limited simultaneous tracking suitable for battery-level defence; Frequency: Pulse/Doppler battlefield surveillance radar optimised for low-altitude target detection; Mobility: Vehicle-mounted, rapidly deployable system for forward air-defence support elements; The LPD-20 is used as a supporting sensor within layered air-defence formations, enhancing short-range engagement response through rapid detection and target cueing. |

== Logistics ==
=== Military trucks ===
| Name | Origin | Type | Number | Image | Details |
|---|---|---|---|---|---|
| MAN Shongololo | Germany South Africa | Tactical military truck | Several thousand in service | | The MAN 6×6 and 8×8 military truck family forms a core component of the South African Army's heavy logistics and support fleet. Locally assembled under licence in South Africa, these vehicles are employed in a wide range of transport, engineering, recovery, and specialist battlefield support roles. The Shongololo serves as a heavy equipment transporter (HET) capable of moving main battle tanks and other armoured vehicles over long strategic distances. Other variants, including the MAN KAT1 series, are used as platforms for logistics transport, radar systems, mobile workshops, fire-fighting units, low-bed transporters, and specialised support equipment. Their high payload capacity, modular design, and strong cross-country mobility allow them to operate effectively in demanding operational environments. |
| MAN KAT-1 | Germany South Africa | Tactical military truck | Several thousand in service | | |
| MAN KAT-1A1 | Germany South Africa | Tactical military truck | Several thousand in service | | |
| SHE Cavallo | South Africa | Tactical military truck | Unknown | | The SHE Cavallo series, including variants such as the Skimmel, Zebra, and Kameelperd, forms part of the modern heavy logistics and specialist support fleet of the South African Army. Manufactured locally in South Africa, these 8×8 vehicles are used for heavy-duty tasks including armoured vehicle recovery, bridge-laying operations, radar transport, and movement of heavy engineering equipment. Several variants are configured for engineering, air-defence, and recovery missions, often operating alongside systems such as the Thutlwa radar and bridge-launching equipment. |
| Giraffe | Italy | Tactical military truck | Unknown | | The Giraffe is an 8×8 heavy logistics vehicle based on the Italian Iveco Trakker platform. Introduced to support the South African Army's heavy transport and logistics requirements, it is used for the movement of cargo, engineering equipment, containers, and heavy military loads across difficult operational terrain. The vehicle features a high-payload chassis, robust suspension system, and strong cross-country mobility, allowing it to operate effectively in both conventional military operations and long-range logistical deployments. Several variants are operated, including heavy recovery platforms and armoured vehicle transport configurations. |
| SAMIL 20 | South Africa | Military support truck | More than 15,000 | Tank bridge transporter | The SAMIL 20 is a light 2-ton 4×4 truck designed in South Africa during the 1980s as part of the SAMIL family of military vehicles. Based on the Magirus Deutz chassis, it became the South African Army's standard light logistics vehicle for troop and cargo transport, ambulances, communication shelters, and general-purpose roles across southern Africa. The SAMIL 50 is a 6-ton 4×4 medium-duty truck developed locally to meet the Army's need for heavier battlefield logistics during the 1980s. It carries bulk cargo, serves as a mobile workshop, or transports troops, water, fuel, and engineering equipment. Its SAMIL 50 MPV variant provides the same capabilities with added mine and ambush protection for frontline operations. The SAMIL 100 is the heaviest in the family, a 10-ton 6×6 platform for hauling armored vehicles, transporting troops, bridging systems, and large engineering loads over long distances. The SAMIL 100 MPV offers a protected version for use in conflict zones where survivability is a priority, an anti-aircraft gun named "Zumlac" is also mounted on this truck. Under Project Thusano, over 10,000 out-of-service SAMIL trucks have been refurbished, meaning that at least around 20,000 trucks across all variants could now be operational within the South African Army. |
| SAMIL 50 | South Africa | Military support truck | More than 15,000 | | |
| SAMIL 100 | South Africa | Military support truck | More than 15,000 | | |
| SAMIL 50 MPV | South Africa | Armoured military truck | More than 15,000 | | |
| SAMIL 100 MPV | South Africa | Armoured military truck | More than 15,000 | | |
| Toyota Dyna | Japan | Medium-duty truck | Unknown | | The Toyota Dyna, locally known as the “Wildebees,” is a medium-duty truck used by the South African Army for general transport duties. Adapted from the civilian Dyna platform, it is employed for light logistics, personnel transport, and utility roles where heavy-duty vehicles like the SAMIL series are not required. Numbers in service remain undisclosed, though it is widely used in secondary logistics roles. |
| UD 70 | South Africa | Medium-duty truck | Unknown | | The UD 70 is a 4×2 medium-duty logistics truck produced by UD Trucks South Africa and widely used by the South African Army for general transport duties. Capable of carrying up to 4 tons of cargo, it fills the gap between light vehicles and the heavier SAMIL or MAN truck families, supporting troop transport, supply delivery, and engineering roles. |

== Engineering ==
The Engineer Formation operates a wide range of militarised construction, recovery, bridging, earthmoving, and geospatial systems to support combat operations, mobility, and infrastructure development. These systems are assigned primarily to engineer support regiments and are used in both conventional operations and disaster relief roles.

=== Combat engineering ===
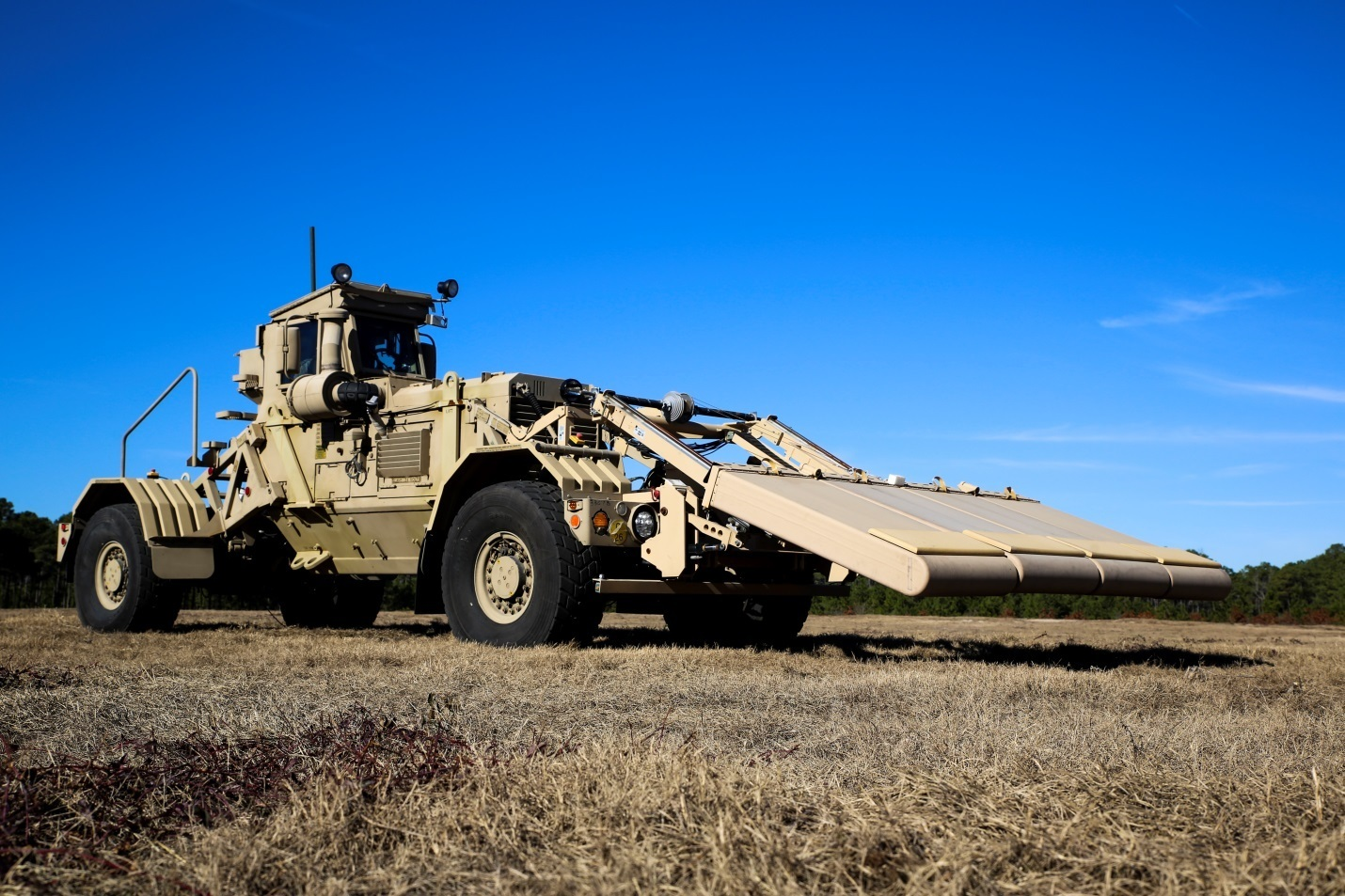
The South African-designed Husky VMMD (also known as the “Meerkat”) is widely used by the Engineer Corps and numerous foreign militaries for route-clearance and mine-detection operations

Combat engineering units operate specialised equipment for mine clearance, breaching, obstacle reduction, and battlefield engineering tasks in hostile environments.

- Husky VMMD: Armoured mine-detection MRAPs used for high-speed route clearance and convoy lane verification, equipped with detection arrays and protected crew cabin.
- Plofadder 160 AT: Rocket-propelled explosive breaching system capable of clearing minefields and creating safe lanes for maneuvering forces.
- MMD Mark 3: Handheld metal detection systems used for route clearance and minefield identification.
- Vlakvark battle tractor: Mine-protected combat engineering vehicle used for trenching, excavation, fortification construction, and route-clearing operations in hostile environments.
- Protected engineering vehicles: Additional armoured engineering support platforms employed for forward construction and obstacle-clearing tasks in mine-threat areas.

These systems support mobility and survivability of deployed forces in both conventional and irregular environments.

=== Construction engineering ===
The Engineer Formation operates a modernised fleet of militarised earthmoving systems procured under the Militarised Operational Earthmoving System (MOEMS) programme between 2015 and 2017. These systems are used for field construction, fortification, obstacle creation, and route development.

- MOEMS Earthmoving Fleet: Includes tractor-loader backhoes (TLBs), skid-steer excavators, tracked and wheeled bulldozers, graders, loaders, trailers, and training simulators introduced under the modernisation programme.
- Dozers, graders, and loaders: Mixed fleet of tracked and wheeled engineering vehicles used for road construction, obstacle clearance, and terrain modification tasks.
- Dump trucks and support vehicles: Military and commercial-type haulage vehicles used for transport of aggregate, engineering materials, and field construction support.

These platforms are widely distributed across engineer units and are used for both domestic infrastructure support and expeditionary engineering tasks.

=== Bridging and assault crossing equipment ===
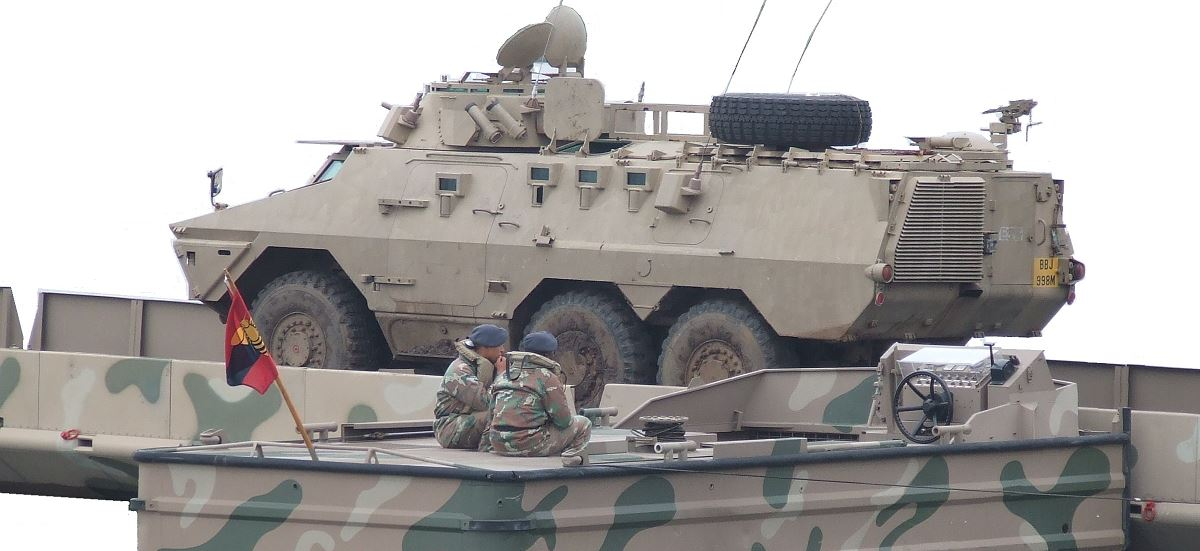
Ratel IFV crossing a river via a pontoon bridge during mobility operations

The Engineer Formation maintains both modular bridge systems and armoured bridge-laying vehicles intended to restore battlefield mobility across rivers, gaps, and damaged infrastructure.

- Leguan bridge-layer: German-designed armoured bridge-launching system capable of rapidly deploying modular tactical bridges for wheeled and tracked vehicle crossings.
- Olifant AVLB: Armoured vehicle-launched bridge based on the Olifant tank chassis used to deploy assault bridges under battlefield conditions.
- Modular Bailey Bridge: Modular prefabricated steel bridge systems used for temporary military and disaster-relief crossings.
- Foldable Floating Bridge: Modular floating bridge system used to transport troops, vehicles, and supplies across rivers and water obstacles during combat and disaster-relief operations.
- Medium Girder Bridge: Portable modular bridge system designed for rapid deployment over gaps, damaged roads, and small river crossings to restore battlefield and logistical mobility.
- Mobile bridging equipment: Transport and support systems used for rapid bridge deployment and route restoration operations.

These systems enable rapid manoeuvre and crossing capability for armoured and mechanised formations during offensive and defensive operations.

=== Armoured recovery vehicles (ARVs) ===
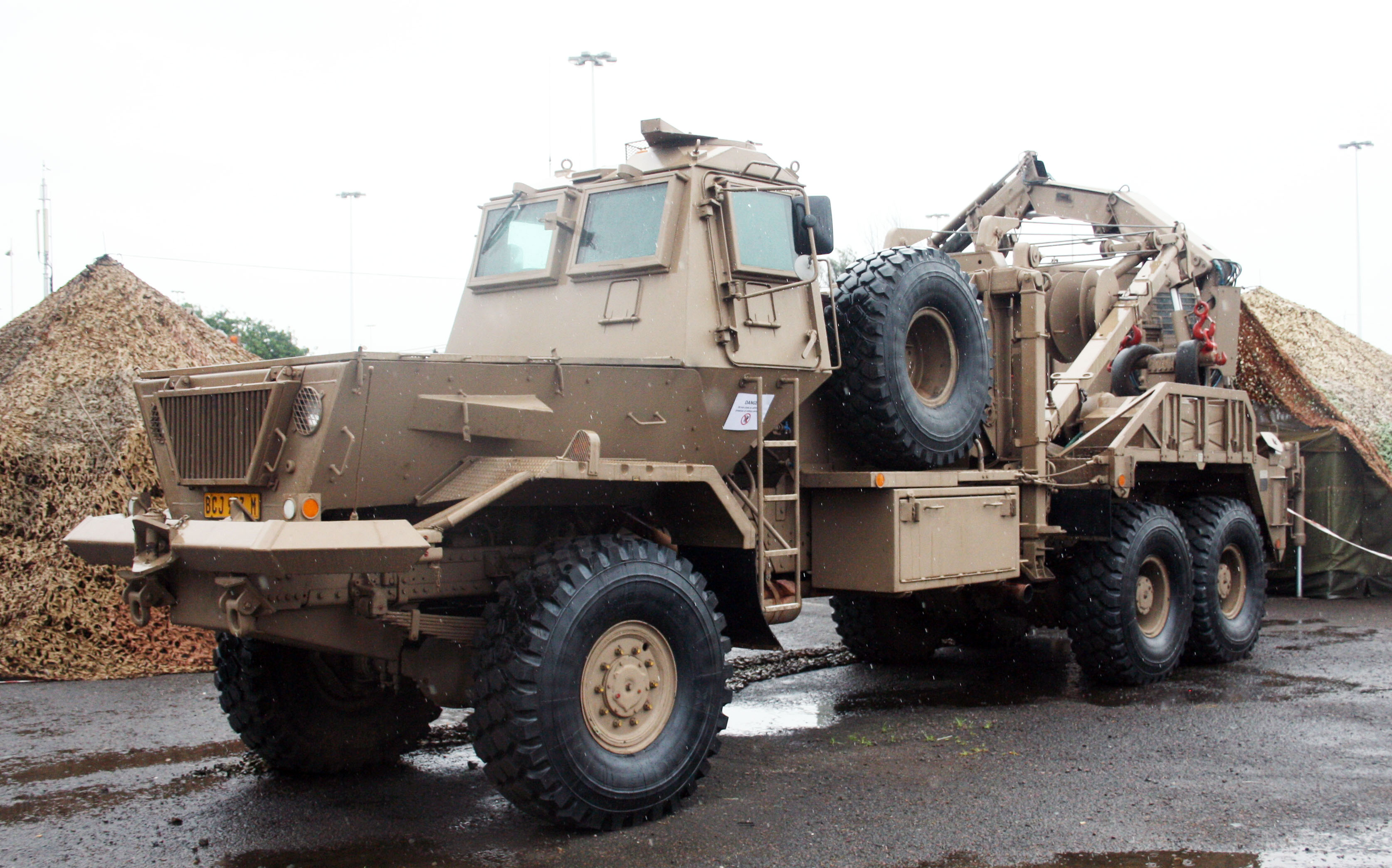
A specialised SAMIL 100 MPV variant used for recovery

Recovery assets are used to extract damaged or immobilised vehicles from combat zones and conduct field-level repair and maintenance operations.

- Olifant ARV: Heavy tracked recovery vehicle based on the Olifant main battle tank chassis, fitted with cranes, winches, earth anchors, and recovery equipment for armoured vehicle extraction and battlefield repair support.
- Casspir ARV: Mine-protected Casspir configurations adapted for light recovery, towing, and engineering support tasks in high-risk operational environments.
- SAMIL trucks: Militarised SAMIL-series trucks configured for towing, engineering logistics, recovery support, and transport of combat engineering equipment.
- Heavy haulage and lowbed systems: MAN and Mercedes-Benz transporters used for movement of armoured vehicles, bridging systems, and heavy engineering machinery.

These systems provide layered recovery capability ranging from light battlefield extraction to heavy armoured recovery operations.

=== Geospatial and operational support systems ===
Engineer formations also provide mapping, surveying, and terrain analysis capabilities for operational planning.

- Mobile Operational Geographic System (MOGS): Mobile geospatial intelligence system used for mapping, terrain analysis, and operational planning support.
- Survey and field engineering tools: Equipment used for construction planning, route reconnaissance, and infrastructure assessment.

These systems support operational planning, terrain analysis, and battlefield mobility management.

== Light tactical vehicles ==
=== All-terrain vehicles ===
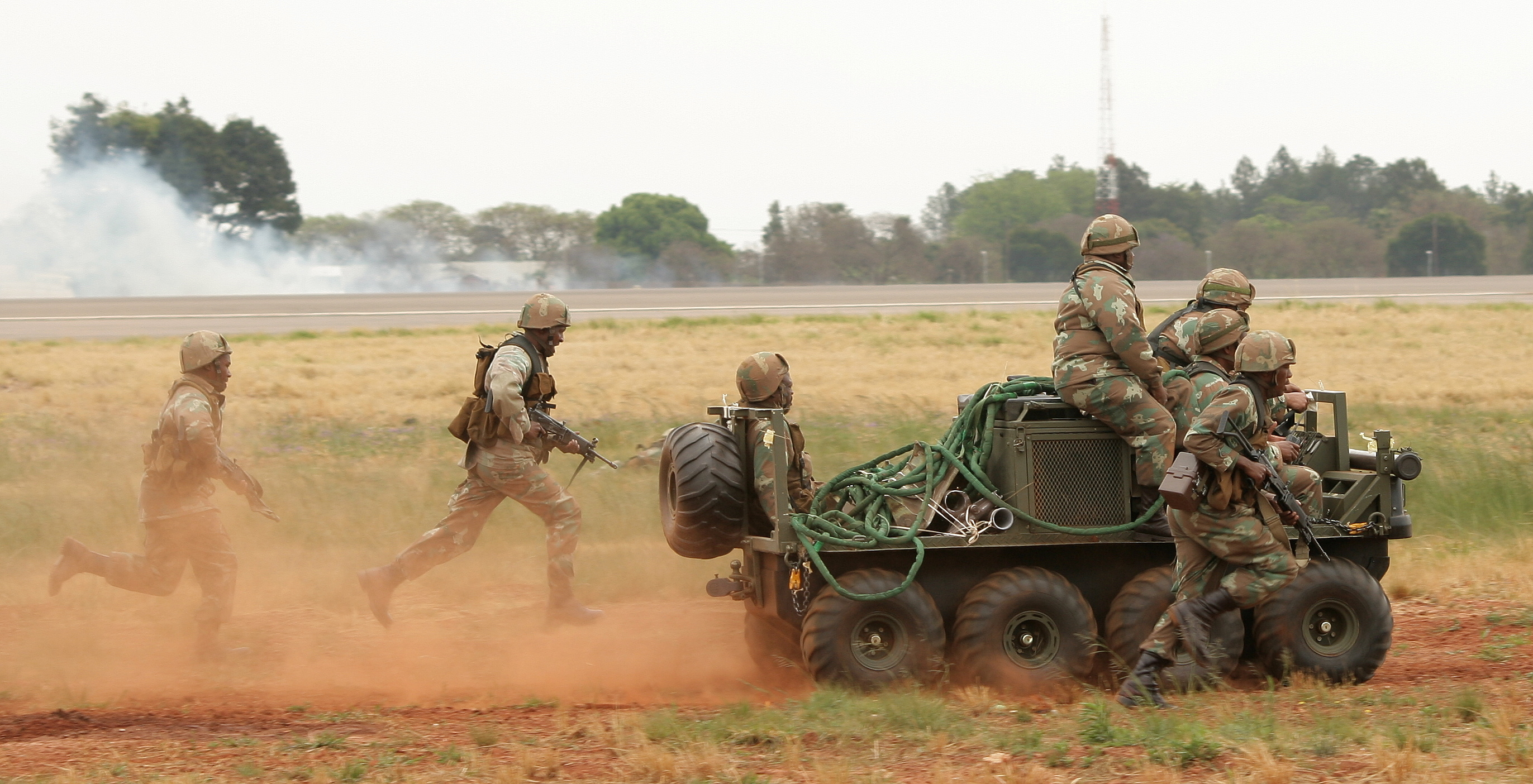
South African Army soldiers with a Gecko ATV

There is one known all-terrain vehicle (ATV) operated by the South African Army, primarily associated with airborne, reconnaissance, and special operations units.

Approximately 112 Gecko 6×6 ATVs were acquired for airborne and special forces formations under Project Ambition 1B. The Gecko is an amphibious light transport platform capable of operating across rough terrain and water obstacles, while also being light enough for helicopter airlift and rapid deployment operations. Modified variants have also been observed carrying the Starstreak LML air-defence missile system to improve tactical mobility and rapid low-altitude air-defence capability.

=== Utility vehicles ===
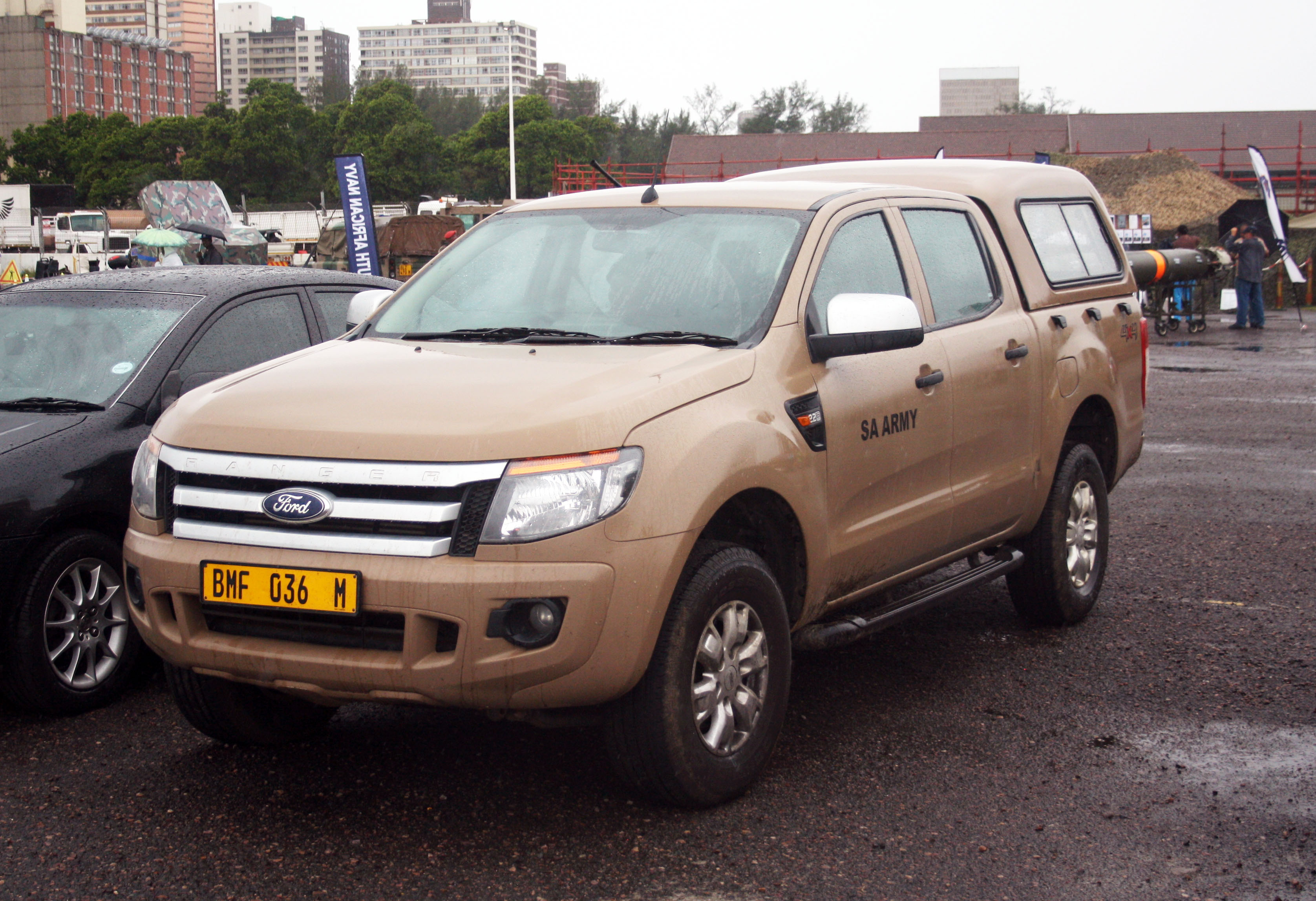
A Ford Ranger light utility vehicle used by the South African Army

In addition to dedicated military all-terrain vehicles, the South African Army also operates a large number of civilian-derived utility and transport vehicles adapted for military service.

These include platforms such as the Ford Ranger, Toyota Land Cruiser, Land Rover, motorcycles, minibuses, buses, and other commercial utility vehicles employed for liaison, logistics, patrol, training, convoy escort, and general transport duties across Army formations.

Many of these vehicles are acquired in relatively small batches, modified locally for operational requirements, or rotated through service over time, making it difficult to compile a complete and accurate public inventory.

== Explosive ordnance disposal (EOD) ==
| Name | Origin | Type | Number | Image | Details |
|---|---|---|---|---|---|
| Digital Vanguard-S | South Africa | EOD Explosive ordnance disposal | Unknown | | The Digital Vanguard-S is a compact unmanned ground vehicle (UGV) operated by the South African Army Engineer Formation for explosive ordnance disposal (EOD) and counter-IED operations. Small enough to be rapidly deployed in confined urban terrain, the system is designed to reduce risk to EOD personnel during hazardous-device investigations. The Vanguard-S is fitted with remotely operated cameras, sensors, and a manipulator arm used to identify, inspect, and handle suspicious explosive devices from a safe distance. Its compact size and mobility allow it to operate in restricted environments where larger EOD systems may be impractical. The system has been observed in limited South African Army service alongside specialist bomb-disposal and route-clearance units, although the full extent of its operational deployment and procurement numbers remains undisclosed. |
| Iveco 50C15 | Italy | EOD Explosive ordnance disposal | Unknown | | The Iveco 50C15 EOD vehicle is a specialised bomb-disposal and explosive ordnance response truck operated by the Engineer Formation to support counter-IED and hazardous-device operations. The vehicle is used to carry protective bomb suits, disruption tools, portable X-ray systems, electronic equipment, and remotely operated EOD platforms required for explosive-device investigation and disposal tasks. Its enclosed cargo configuration allows specialist equipment to be rapidly deployed during military security operations and explosive-threat incidents. The Iveco 50C15 supports South African Army EOD and ammunition technical personnel during domestic security, route-clearance, and explosive-threat response operations, providing a mobile platform for rapid deployment and sustainment of bomb-disposal teams. |

== Aircraft ==
The South African Army does not maintain a dedicated Army Aviation Corps and operates no manned fixed-wing aircraft or helicopters. Army airborne, air-assault, and paratrooper operations rely on transport and aviation support provided by the South African Air Force (SAAF), including Oryx helicopters and C-130 Hercules transport aircraft.

Despite the absence of an established army aviation branch, the SA Army operates and has access to a number of unmanned aerial vehicles (UAVs) for reconnaissance, surveillance, battlefield observation, and intelligence-gathering roles in support of ground operations;

| Aircraft | Origin | Class | Role | Introduced | In service | Total | Details |
|---|---|---|---|---|---|---|---|
| ATE Vulture | South Africa | UAV | ISTAR | 2006 | 4+ | 4+ | Used for target acquisition, fall-of-shot detection and fire correction in support of towed and self-propelled gun howitzer systems of the Artillery Formation. |
| Denel Dynamics Seeker 400 | South Africa | UAV | ISTAR | 2015 | 3+ | 3+ | Used by the Defence Intelligence Division. |
| CSIR Indiza | South Africa | UAV | ISR | 2018 | N/A | N/A | Primarily used for tactical surveillance and reconnaissance missions. |
| DJI Phantom | China | UAV | ISR | — | N/A | N/A | |
| DJI Matrice | China | UAV | ISR | — | N/A | N/A | Used for border patrol, base protection and route reconnaissance. |
| DJI Mavic Pro | China | UAV | ISR | — | N/A | N/A | |
| Denel Dynamics LOCATS | South Africa | Target drone | — | 1991 | N/A | N/A | Used for air defence artillery training and gunnery practice. |

== Watercraft ==
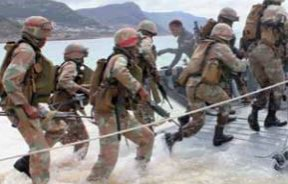
Soldiers of 9 South African Infantry Battalion (9 SAI) embarking aboard an assault craft during amphibious and seaborne infantry training exercises.

The South African Army operates a small number of assault, reconnaissance, and bridging-support watercraft primarily used by the Engineer Formation and the Army's seaborne infantry capability during river-crossing, amphibious, reconnaissance, and disaster-relief operations.

Unlike many countries, where amphibious infantry roles are typically performed by a dedicated Marine Corps, the South African Army itself maintains a regular seaborne infantry battalion in the form of 9 South African Infantry Battalion (9 SAI). This capability should not be confused with the South African Navy's elite Maritime Reaction Squadron (MRS), which is a separate naval force responsible for maritime security, boarding, and naval infantry operations.

=== Assault Boat Mk IV ===
The Assault Boat Mk IV is a rigid assault craft used for combat river crossings, engineering support, troop transport, and amphibious operations. Constructed with a shallow-draft aluminium hull and powered by an outboard motor, the boat is capable of transporting up to 13 troops or approximately two tonnes of cargo across inland waterways.

The craft is primarily operated by the Engineer Formation and seaborne infantry units, where it supports pontoon bridge deployment, tactical river crossings, and mobility operations.

=== Reconnaissance Boat Mk III ===
The Reconnaissance Boat Mk III is a lightweight inflatable reconnaissance craft used for patrol, reconnaissance, and small-team insertion tasks in riverine and coastal environments.

Powered by an 18.4 kW outboard motor, the boat is capable of carrying a small reconnaissance team of up to three personnel. Its lightweight inflatable construction allows rapid deployment, portability, and operation in confined or shallow-water environments.

=== Inflatable Assault Boat ===
The Inflatable Assault Boat is a flexible troop-carrying craft used for assault crossings, patrol operations, disaster relief, and light amphibious support missions.

Powered by a 36.8 kW outboard motor, the boat can carry up to eight troops and is designed for rapid deployment during combat engineering and infantry support operations. Its inflatable construction allows easy transport and deployment alongside bridging and river-crossing equipment.

== Future equipment ==
=== Infantry ===
==== Project Tedu ====
Army personnel operating Truvelo DMR and Truvelo CMS platforms

Project Tedu is the SA Army's sniper modernisation programme initiated in April 2025 and intended to replace the ageing Vektor R1 sniper capability and improve long-range precision fire support capability at infantry section and platoon level.

Focus areas include:

- Modern sniper weapon systems
- Designated marksman rifle (DMR) capability

Successful implementations include the introduction of the Truvelo Counter Measure Sniper (CMS) system into SA Army service, while the designated marksman rifle remains under evaluation and trials as part of the programme.

==== Future service rifle ====
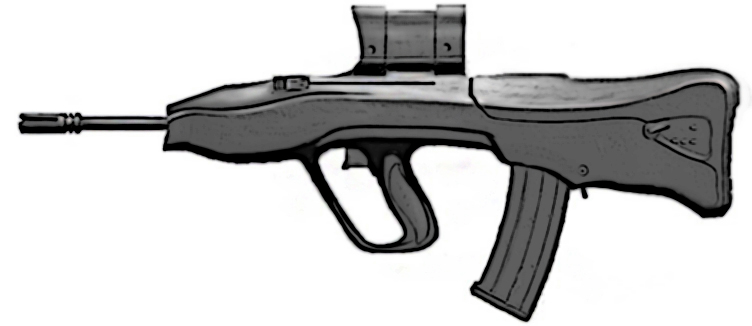
Vektor CR-21

The SA Army is considering the replacement of the Vektor R4 and R5 assault rifles, which have been in South African security service since the 1980s. In September 2026, Armscor issued a Request for Information (RFI) to assess available self-loading rifle systems as part of a functional study, rather than an immediate procurement programme. The RFI envisages a family of weapons comprising an assault rifle or battle rifle alongside a dedicated designated marksman rifle, with submissions covering weapons, ammunition, magazines, optics, maintenance and local logistical support.

The R4 and R5 are locally manufactured variants of the Israeli-designed IMI Galil, with the R4 serving as the standard assault rifle and the shorter R5 primarily as a carbine. An earlier attempt to replace the R4 was made with the Vektor CR-21, a locally developed bullpup assault rifle unveiled in 1997 and manufactured in limited numbers during the 1990s. Designed by Denel Land Systems as a potential R4 replacement, the CR-21 attracted little interest from the South African security forces and did not enter service.

==== Future combat uniform ====
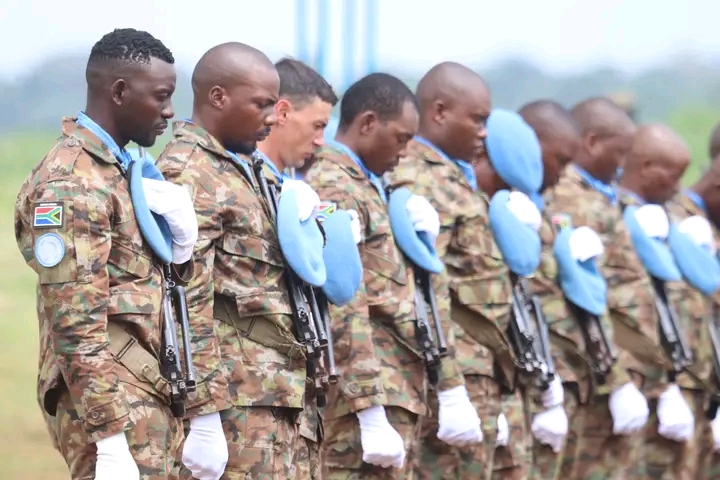
Army personnel dressed in the new "Camo" combat uniform standing in formation during a medal parade in the DRC

The SA Army is undertaking additional infantry modernisation efforts focused on replacing elements of the long-serving Soldier 2000 combat uniform with new-generation infantry clothing and personal protection equipment.

Focus areas include:

- New camouflage combat uniform
- Modern combat boot systems
- Modular body armour systems
- Improved soldier comfort, mobility, and protection

Current developments include trials of a new camouflage combat uniform and combat boot system intended for future standard issue, with initial deliveries reportedly expected from 2026. The Army has additionally explored the development of modular body armour systems in cooperation with local South African defence companies.

=== Vehicles ===
==== Project Aorta ====
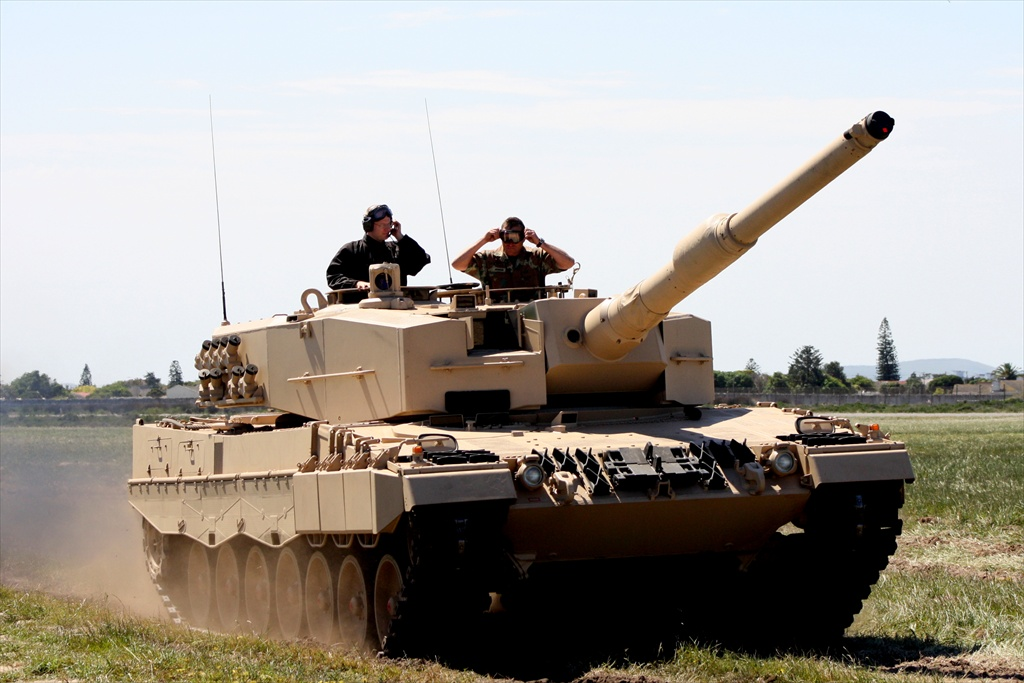
South African Army conducting a field inspection of the Leopard 2 main battle tank during operational evaluation exercises

Project Aorta is a proposed South African Army Armoured Corps modernisation programme intended to replace or partially replace the ageing Olifant fleet with a new-generation main battle tank capability.

- Role: future heavy armour capability
- Potential platforms: Leopard 2 main battle tank was considered
- Status: indefinitely postponed due to financial and procurement constraints

The programme emerged following concerns that the Olifant tank had reached the practical limits of further modernisation despite extensive upgrades under the Olifant Mk1B and Mk2 programmes.

==== Project Hoefyster ====
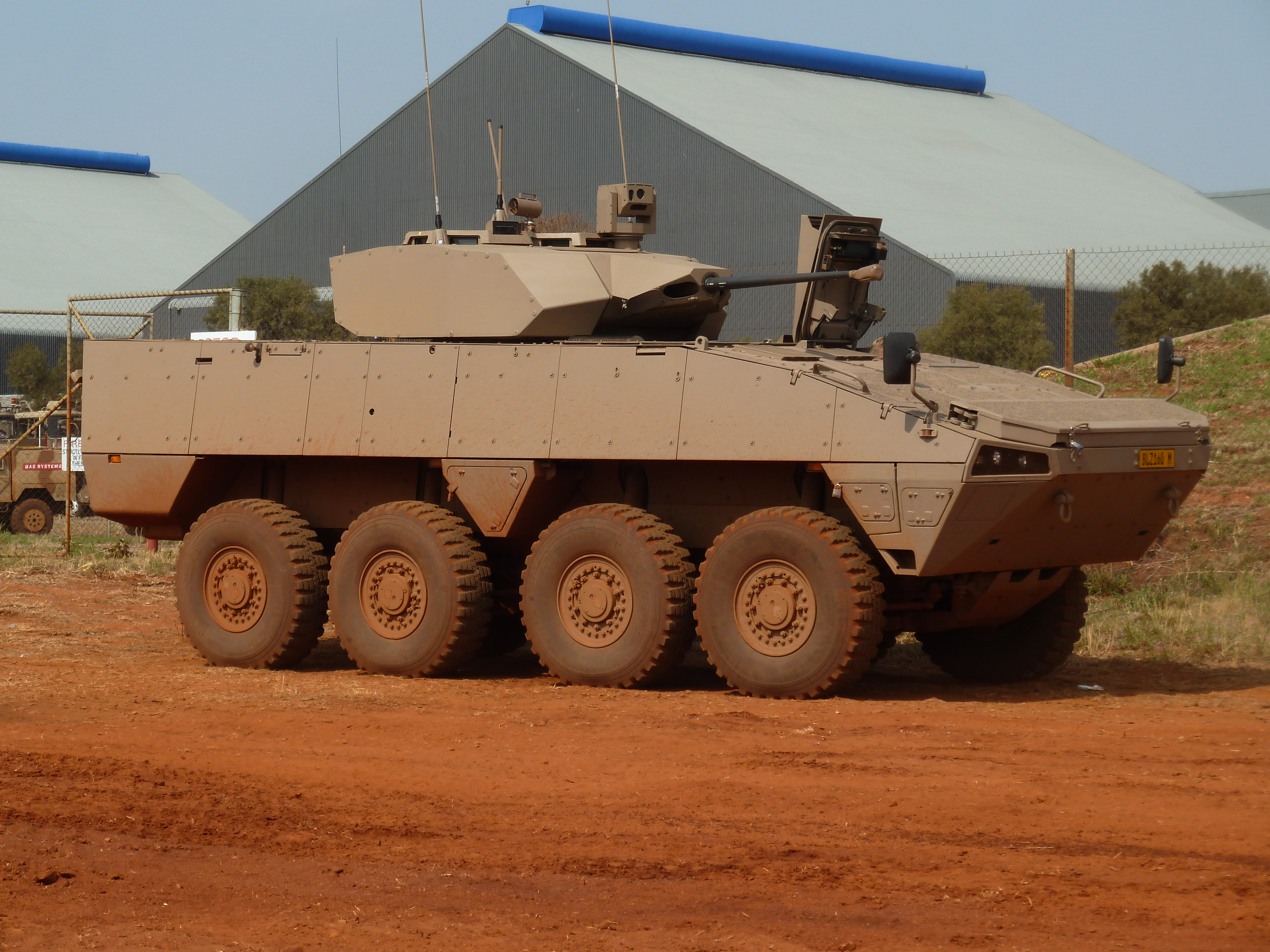
A pre-production Badger infantry fighting vehicle

Project Hoefyster (English: Horseshoe) is the SA Army's primary mechanised infantry modernisation programme, intended to replace portions of the ageing Ratel infantry fighting vehicle fleet with new modular and heavily armed mechanised combat vehicles.

- Platform: Badger IFV based on the Patria AMV 8×8 (heavily South Africanised design)
- Role: mechanised armoured warfare providing protected troop transport and fire support
- Planned procurement: 244 vehicles
- Primary contractor: Denel Land Systems
- Contract value: approximately R8.4 billion
- Delivery timeframe: paused
- Status: stalled pending renewed government funding; only 22 pre-production vehicles have been delivered from Finland

The programme remains the Army's largest mechanised vehicle acquisition effort, although it has experienced significant delays and restructuring due to staff shortages and financial problems at Denel.

==== ELWS/2024/71 ====
Milkor personnel carriers ahead of evaluation trials, showcasing pre-production units undergoing final preparation prior to testing

A protected mobility procurement programme forming part of the wider Project Sepula effort, intended to improve the SA Army's border safeguarding and internal security capabilities through the introduction of modern MRAP vehicles. The programme seeks to reduce reliance on soft-skinned utility vehicles such as Toyota Land Cruiser-based patrol platforms in frontline operational roles.

- Platform: Milkor 4x4 MRAP
- Role: motorised mine-resistant protected mobility for troop transport
- Planned procurement: nearly 500 vehicles (initial batch)
- Primary contractor: Milkor
- Contract value: approximately R500 million
- Delivery timeframe: 2027–2029
- Status: contract awarded (2025), in early production and procurement phase

The programme is intended to enhance survivability, mobility, and operational endurance in hostile environments while reducing exposure of personnel operating in lightly protected vehicles.

==== Project Sepula ====
Project Sepula is a proposed protected mobility modernisation programme intended to replace or partially replace ageing MRAP vehicle fleets such as Casspir and Mamba used by motorised infantry.

- Role: motorised mine-resistant protected mobility for troop transport
- Planned procurement: as many as 2,000 vehicles
- Status: effectively postponed due to budget constraints
- Interim solution: continued life-extension and refurbishment of current platforms

==== Project Phalama ====
A Denel Africa armoured combat military truck based on the RG-31 Nyala chassis

Project Phalama (formerly Vistula) is a planned logistics vehicle modernisation programme aimed at replacing ageing soft-skinned vehicles, primarily SAMIL-series military trucks.

- Role: mine-resistant tactical and operational logistics mobility
- Planned procurement: many
- Status: effectively postponed due to budget constraints
- Interim solution: continued life-extension and refurbishment of current platforms

=== Artillery ===
==== Project Musuku ====
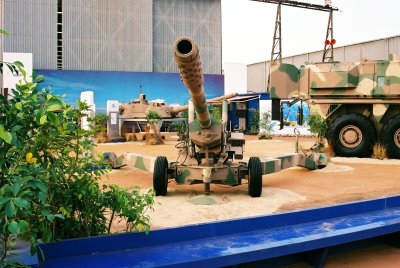
G7 LEO (Lightweight Experimental Ordnance)

Project Musuku is a South African Army artillery modernisation and development programme centred around the Denel Land Systems G7 LEO (Lightweight Experimental Ordnance) lightweight 105 mm howitzer.

- Platform: G7 LEO (Lightweight Experimental Ordnance)
- Role: highly mobile and expeditionary artillery support
- Primary contractor: Denel Land Systems
- Status: concept and development phase; no confirmed production orders

Development priorities include digital fire-control integration, extended-range capability, reduced crew requirements, and lower logistical burden compared to existing artillery systems.

==== Project Topstar / Muhali ====
The South African Army Artillery Formation continues to upgrade its legacy artillery systems through incremental capability enhancement programmes.

Focus areas include:

- Digital fire-control system upgrades
- Improved target acquisition and sensor integration
- Enhanced mobility and survivability upgrades

The programmes are intended to maintain the operational relevance of systems such as the Bateleur FV2 multiple launch rocket system (MLRS) as well as the G5 and G6 gun-howitzers.

=== Air defence ===
==== Projects Guardian / Protector / Outcome ====
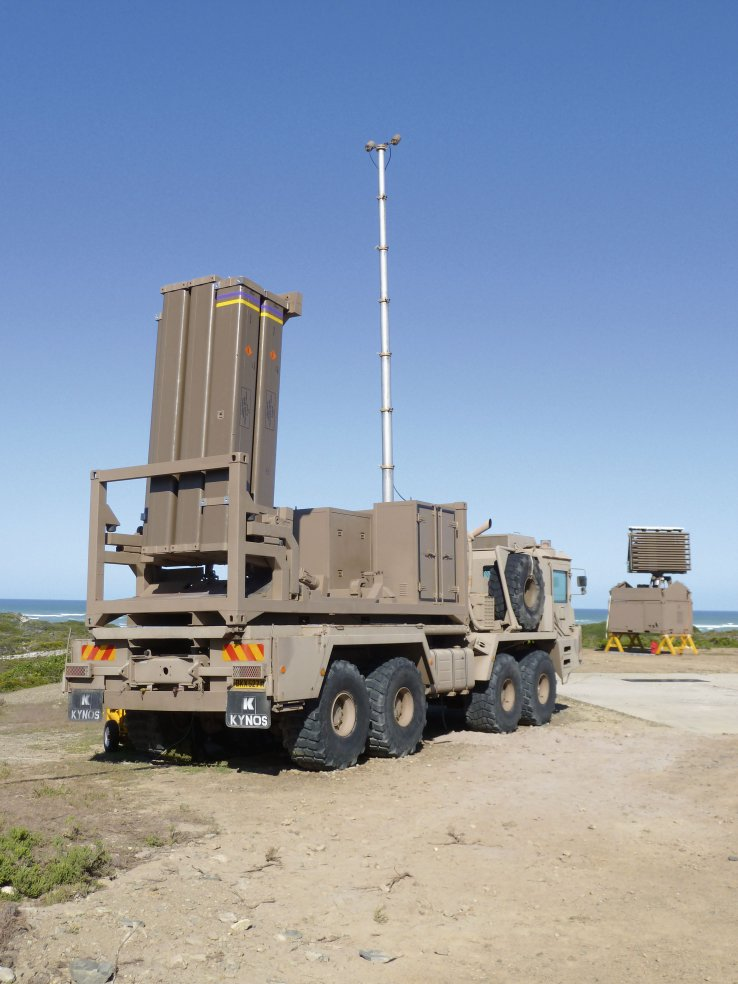
The Umkhonto ground-based missile air defence system

The Army's Ground-Based Air Defence System (GBADS) programme is structured into three linked projects.

Project Guardian (Completed)

- Introduction of Starstreak VSHORAD missile systems
- Upgraded ESR 220 Thutlwa radar and fire-control systems
- Improved low-altitude air-defence capability

Project Protector (Completed)

- Upgrade of Oerlikon GDF 35 mm systems to Mk VII "Skyshield" standard
- Integration of AHEAD programmable ammunition capability
- Enhanced radar and digital fire-control integration via Project Radiate

Project Outcome (In progress)

- Integration of the indigenous Umkhonto surface-to-air missile system
- Intended layered short-to-medium range air-defence capability
- Ongoing testing and systems integration work

=== Unmanned aerial systems ===
==== Project Swift ====
Project Swift is a target drone development programme intended to replace ageing aerial target systems such as the Denel LOCATS and improve modern air-defence artillery training capability.

- Platform: VTOL target drone system
- Role: aerial target simulation and air-defence training
- Developer: Council for Scientific and Industrial Research (CSIR)
- Configuration: electric vertical takeoff and landing (VTOL) fixed-wing drone
- Status: development and testing phase

The programme is intended to provide a low-cost and highly deployable target drone capability capable of simulating modern aerial threats including low-flying UAVs, drone swarms, and saturation attacks. Future production models are expected to feature a wingspan of approximately three metres and incorporate low-cost manufacturing methods including 3D printing technologies.

==== Tactical UAV acquisition programme ====
A tactical unmanned aerial vehicle procurement programme intended to improve the South African Army's reconnaissance, surveillance, border safeguarding, and battlefield intelligence capabilities through the acquisition of new quadcopter and long-range UAV systems.

- Platforms: quadcopter UAVs and fixed-wing long-range UAV systems
- Role: tactical reconnaissance, surveillance, intelligence gathering, and border monitoring
- Planned procurement: 16 quadcopter UAVs and additional long-range UAV systems
- Primary contractors: AutonoSky and Autel Robotics
- Contract value: approximately R40 million
- Status: procurement and capability expansion phase

The programme includes training, support, maintenance, and integration of modern ISR capabilities for Army tactical intelligence and border safeguarding operations. The South African Army is additionally evaluating locally developed UAV platforms for future tactical and expeditionary missions.

=== Unmanned ground systems ===
The SANDF is currently experimenting with robotic and autonomous ground platforms for reconnaissance, cargo transport, and ISTAR roles.

Trial systems have included platforms developed by Denel Mechem, DCD Protected Mobility, Rheinmetall, and other defence companies.

== See also ==
- List of equipment of the South African National Defence Force
- South African Air Force
- South African Navy
- South African Special Forces
- List of South African military bases
