= M63 helmet =

Combat helmet of South African origin

The M63 (nicknamed "Staaldak" in Afrikaans) is a combat helmet of South African origin. Based on the French Modèle 1951 helmet, the M63 replaced the British type Brodie helmets during the early 1960s, and saw extensive use during the Rhodesian and Angolan bush wars. It was issued until the 1980s when it was replaced by the M87 kevlar helmet.
