= M83 kevlar helmet =

South African combat helmet

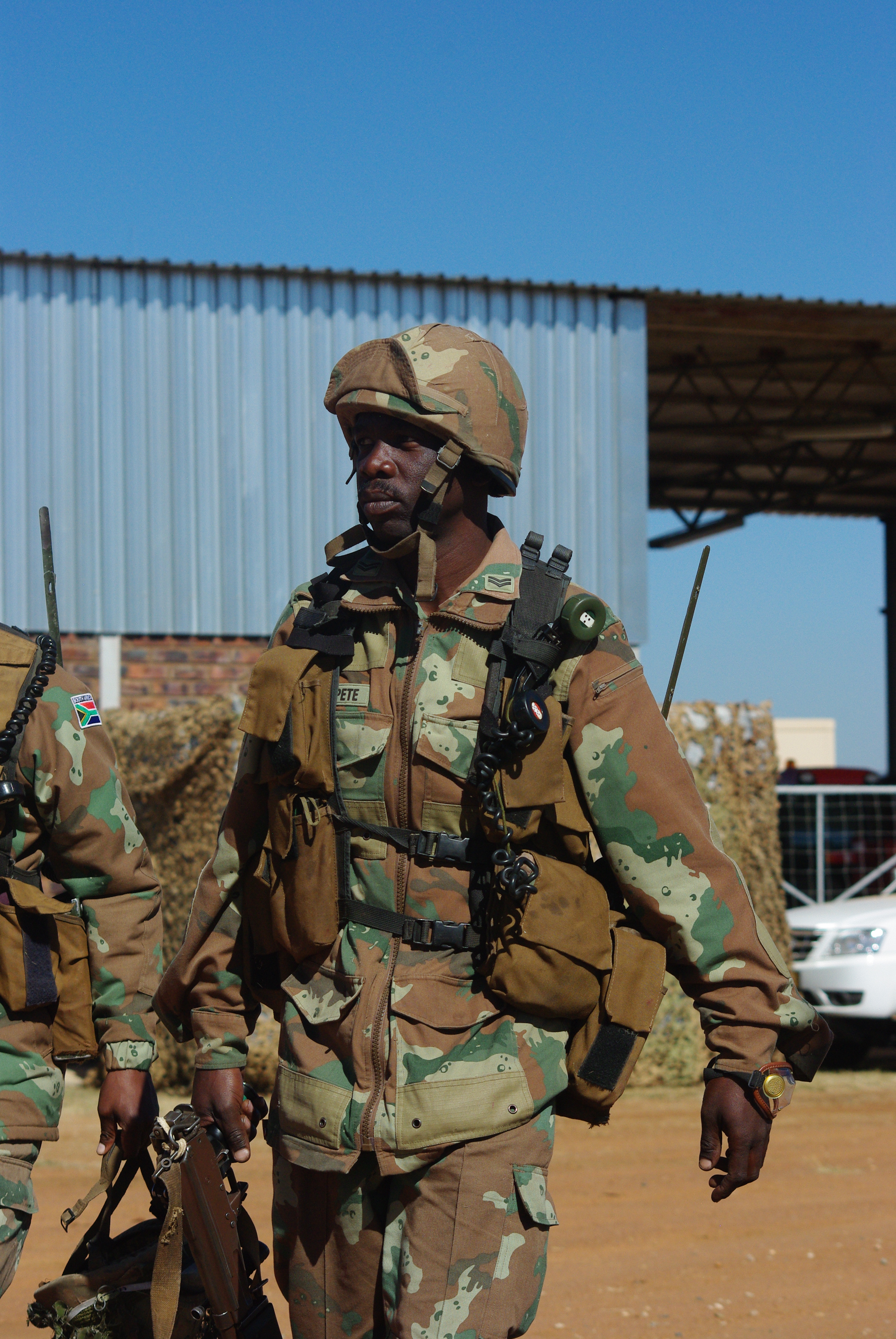
South African paratrooper wearing the SA M83 version of the OR-201 helmet at the Roodewal Weapons Range, 9 May 2013.

The M83 kevlar helmet is a combat helmet of South Africa manufactured by South African Pith Helmet Industries (S.A.P.H.I) of Rosslyn, and adopted in 1983 from the Israeli headset OR-201. The kevlar composite M83 saw extensive use by the Paratroopers and Recce Commandos during the South African Border War, which took place from 1966 to 1989 in South-West Africa (Namibia) and Angola. It is still used by the South African National Defence Force.
