= M87 kevlar helmet =

South African combat helmet

The M87 is a combat helmet of South African origin manufactured by South African Pith Helmet Industries (S.A.P.H.I) of Rosslyn. The kevlar composite M87 replaced the steel M63 helmet during the late 1980s, and saw extensive use during the South African Border War, which took place from 1966 to 1989 in South-West Africa (Namibia) and Angola. It is the current standard helmet of the South African National Defence Force. In service: 1987-present

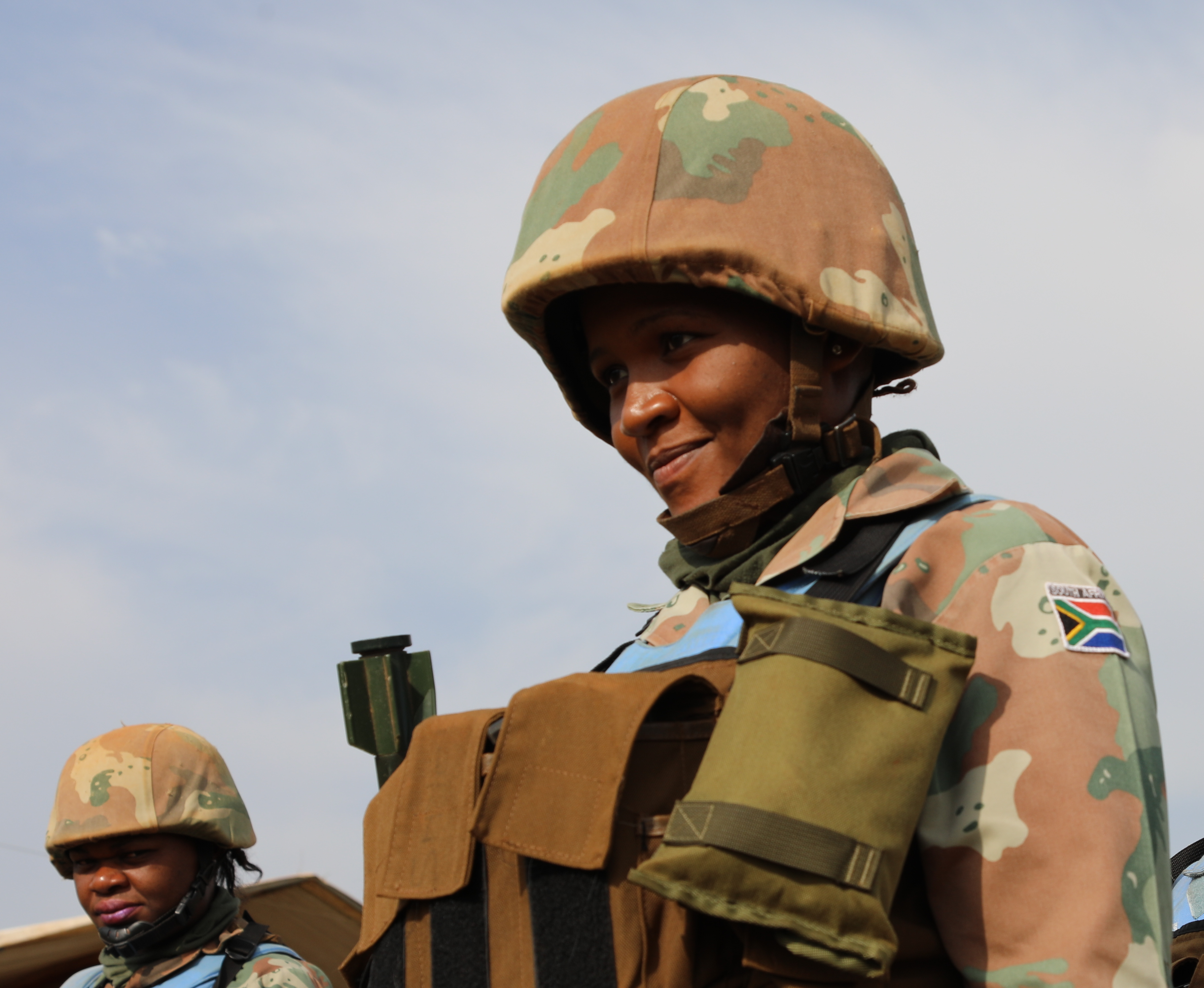
South African soldier of MONUSCO contingent in Democratic Republic of Congo wearing M87 kevlar helmet, 2018.

== Users ==
- South Africa
