= List of equipment of the South African National Defence Force =

This is a list of the military equipment of South Africa, including the Army, Air force, and Navy.

== See also ==
- South African National Defence Force
- South African Special Forces
- Military industry of South Africa
