= 9 South African Infantry Battalion =

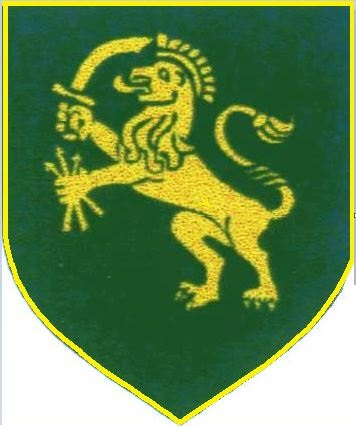
- 9 SAI emblem
- Country: South Africa
- Branch: South African Army
- Type: Motorised infantry (seaborne)
- Part of: South African Infantry Formation
- Garrison/HQ: Cape Town, Western Cape
- Mottos: Fortiter et fideliter (Boldly and faithfully); Ebenhaeser (Thus far the Lord has led us)
- Battle honours: Cape of Good Hope (Note: Awarded in 1841 for service during the 4th, 5th and 6th Frontier Wars. Not inherited by subsequent incarnations.); Kilimanjaro (Note: Inherited from the SA Cape Corps) (Note: All awarded in 1926 and inherited by the SACC Service Bn in 1978); Behobeho; Nyangao; East Africa 1916-17; East Africa 1917-18; Megiddo; Nablus; Palestine 1918

Insignia
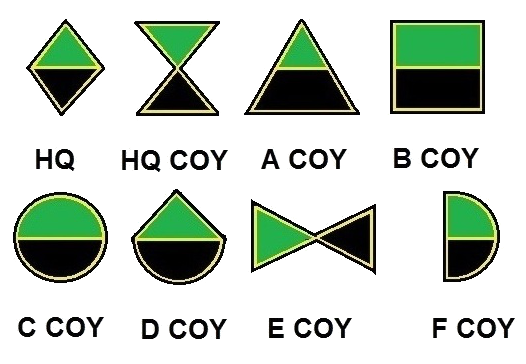
- Company level Insignia

- SA Motorised Infantry beret bar circa 1992: SA Motorised Infantry beret bar

9 South African Infantry Battalion is a motorised infantry unit of the South African Army, designated seaborne.

== History ==
What was previously known as the South African Cape Corps (SACC) (Afrikaans: Suid-Afrika Kaapse Korps (SAKK)) was renamed the 9 South African Infantry Battalion (9 SAI) in 1992.

On 31 March 1992, all SACC units were disbanded. The next day 9 SAI was established in their place.

== Deployments ==
9 SAI was deployed in Burundi in early 2006. Companies were deployed in different provinces and started projects such as upgrading hospitals, repainting school buildings, repairing the roofs, donating sports equipment to schools, sharing food with the local population and participating in different sports with the local population, the national police and the Burundi Defence Force.

== Role ==
9 SAI is organised as motorised infantry with a seaborne (amphibious) specialisation. Official South African Army Western Cape contact tables (revision dated December 2010) listed the unit as a regular motorised infantry battalion.

In the draft South African Army Vision 2020 force design, the 2007 organograms published with Leon Engelbrecht's unpublished manuscript A Guide to the SANDF chart 9 SAI as a sealanding battalion in the Special Operations Brigade, paired with the Cape Town Highlanders, and also as motorised infantry under 2 Motorised Brigade (Cape) of the Motorised Division.

== Battle honours ==
Battle Honours
Awarded to 9 South African Infantry Battalion
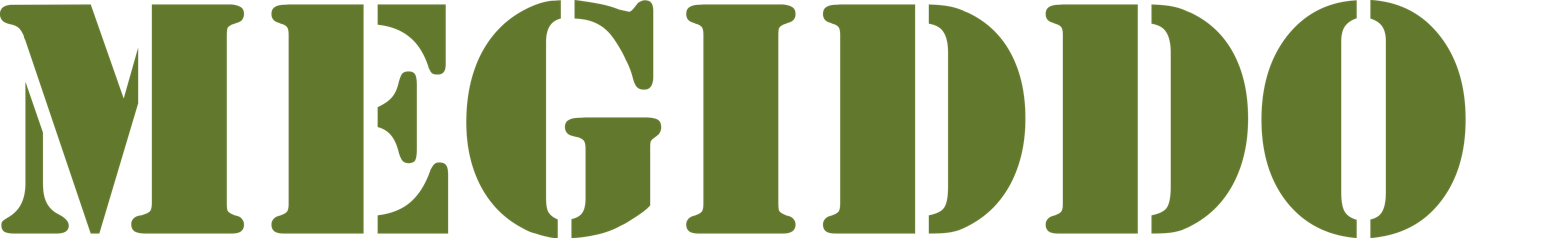

These honours were inherited from the South African Cape Corps (SACC). Cape of Good Hope was awarded in 1841 for service during the 4th, 5th and 6th Frontier Wars and was not inherited by subsequent incarnations. The remaining theatre and battle honours were awarded in 1926 and inherited by the SACC Service Bn in 1978.

== Leadership ==
Leadership
From	Honorary Colonel	To	Ribbon
	No known incumbents		
From	Officer Commanding	To	Ribbon
2014	Lt Col M. Feni	c. nd	
From	Regimental Sergeants Major	To	Ribbon
	No known incumbents		

== Insignia ==
=== Previous Dress Insignia ===
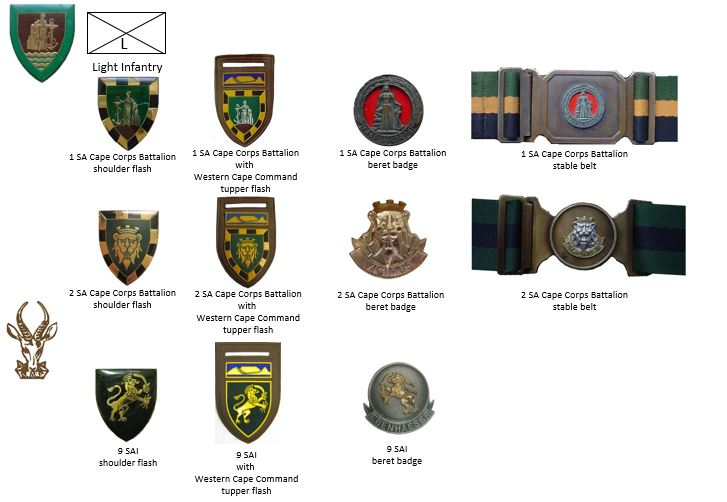
SADF era SA Corps Battalions and 9 SAI insignia

=== Current Dress Insignia ===
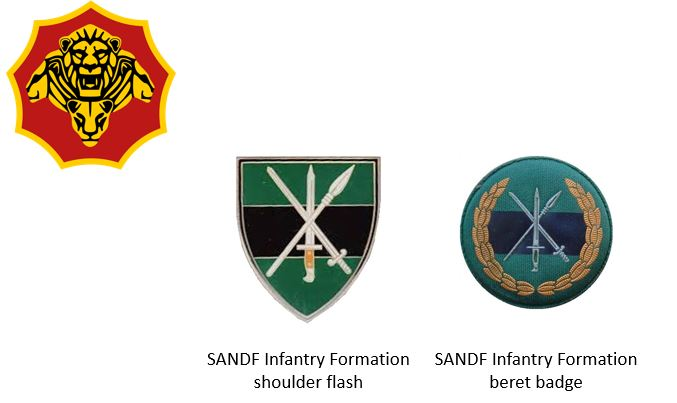
SANDF era Infantry Formation insignia

== Motto ==
- Fortiter et fideliter (Boldly and faithfully)
- Ebenhaeser (Thus far the Lord has led us)

== See also ==
- Military history of South Africa
- South Africa Marine Corps
