= Armscor =

Armscor refers to either:

- Armscor (Philippines), the Philippine manufacturer of firearms and ammunition
- Armscor (South Africa), the South African arms acquisition and sales agency
