= Soldier 2000 =

Military camouflage pattern

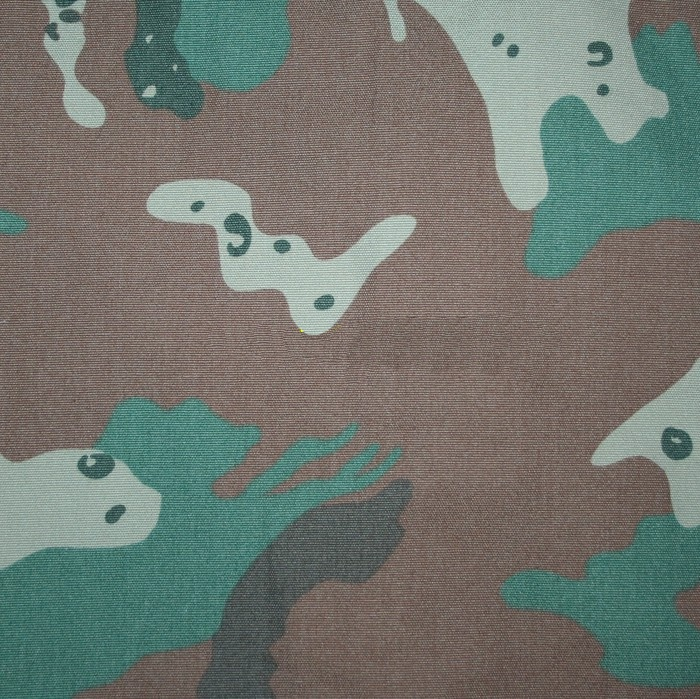
- The Soldier 2000 camouflage pattern
- Type: Military camouflage pattern
- Place of origin: South Africa

Service history
- In service: 1994 – present
- Used by: South African National Defence Force

Production history
- Designer: Council for Scientific and Industrial Research
- Designed: 1991 - 1993
- Produced: 1994–present
- Variants: 1

Soldier 2000 is a military camouflage pattern developed by the Council for Scientific and Industrial Research and is in use with the South African National Defence Force (SANDF). It is designed to be effective in all terrains and seasons encountered across South Africa.

Feasibility studies included the Council for Scientific and Industrial Research and the South African Bureau of Standards (SABS).

== History ==
The SADF had distinctive nutria brown combat fatigues that were developed for operations in South West Africa and Angola around 1964 and first used in 1971. By 1988, it was already realised that a replacement for the nutria uniform had to be developed and the review must include cost, operational effectiveness and suitability to the Southern Africa terrain.

The SA Army officially displayed its new camouflage uniform for the first time at the SA Defence Force Day Parade held in Kimberly on 3 July 1993, which replaced the Nutria brown uniforms. In the Government Gazette in 1993, it mentions that it will be a serious offense for anyone to wear the camo without authorization from the government. The Defence Act of 2002 explicitly prohibits the use of the camo.

On January 23, 2019, an EFF Students Command member named Aseza Mayaphi was reported to be arrested for appearing on TV while wearing the camo. On January 25, Aseza was released with a warning and the case was postponed in order to get a lawyer for him.

On October 23, 2019, the South African government publicly warned against the unauthorized use of the camo after Channel 157 Moja Love showed an actor wearing the uniform without permission.

== Development ==
The Logistics department at Army Headquarters started a comprehensive project, known as Soldier 2000, to develop new combat fatigues that is suited for all climatic conditions found in Southern Africa. The new field dress had to be cost effective, an improvement on the nutria uniform “Browns” and technologically advanced. It had to be practical and easy to maintain and in line with international trends. The new camouflage uniform had to protect the soldier from the harsh elements encountered in the local environment and from observation (including infra-red observation). The camouflage pattern, developed by CSIR-Textile Technology group, is unique to South Africa's terrain and printed on a wide variety of uniform items as well as field equipment.

The camouflage pattern is made up of five colours most commonly found in Southern Africa with Kalahari brown as base colour and blotches of dark green, grass green & pale green with dark green & pale green spots forming the camouflage.

The combat fatigues materials are 50% polyester and 50% cotton with colouring injected into the fibres trying to achieve a 95% adhesive for longer than 36 months if treated correctly. The pattern gets repeated every 101 cm in length and 150 cm width.

The new field dress includes items like jackets, hats, boots, helmet covers, underclothing and cold weather garments.

== Gallery ==
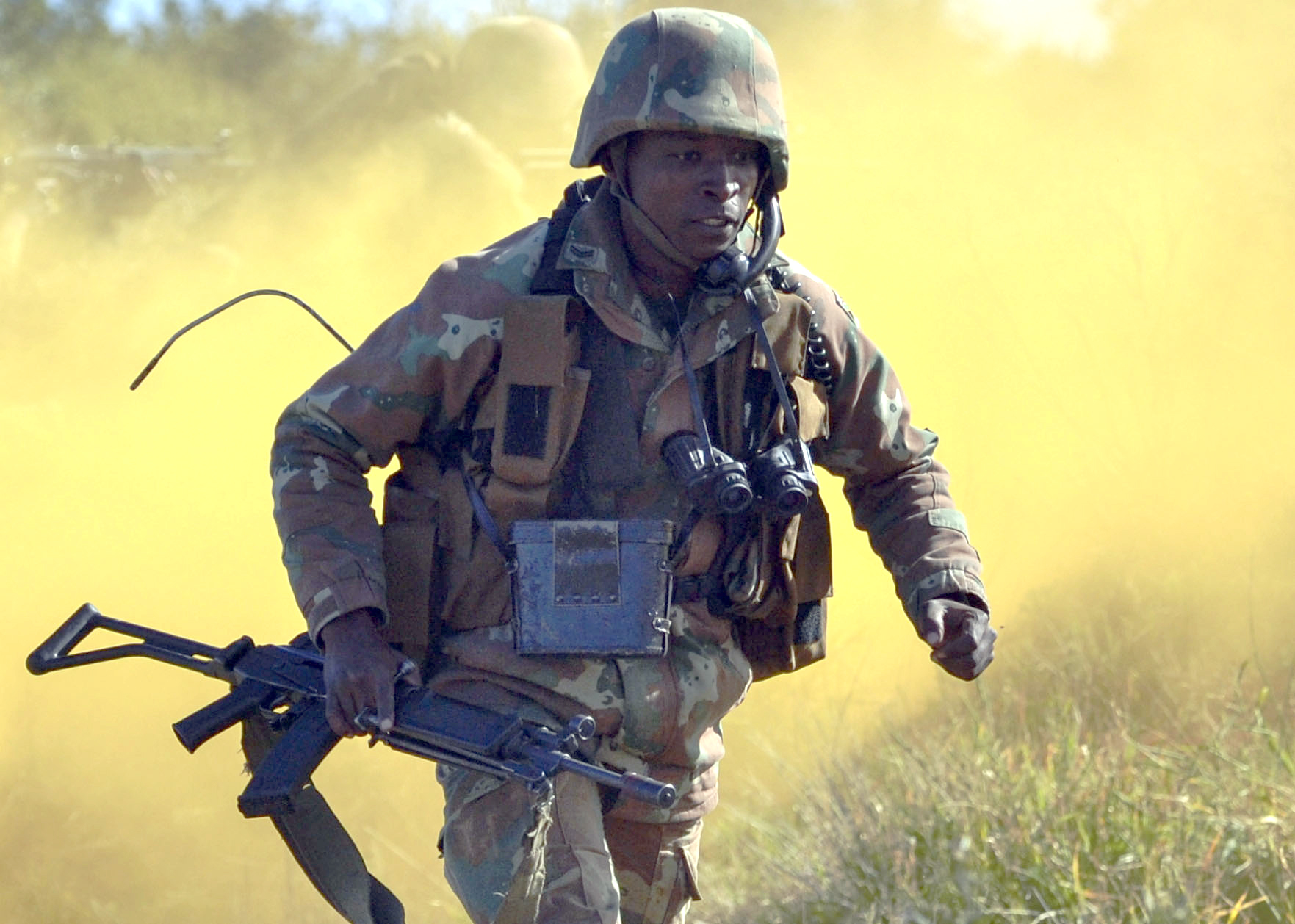

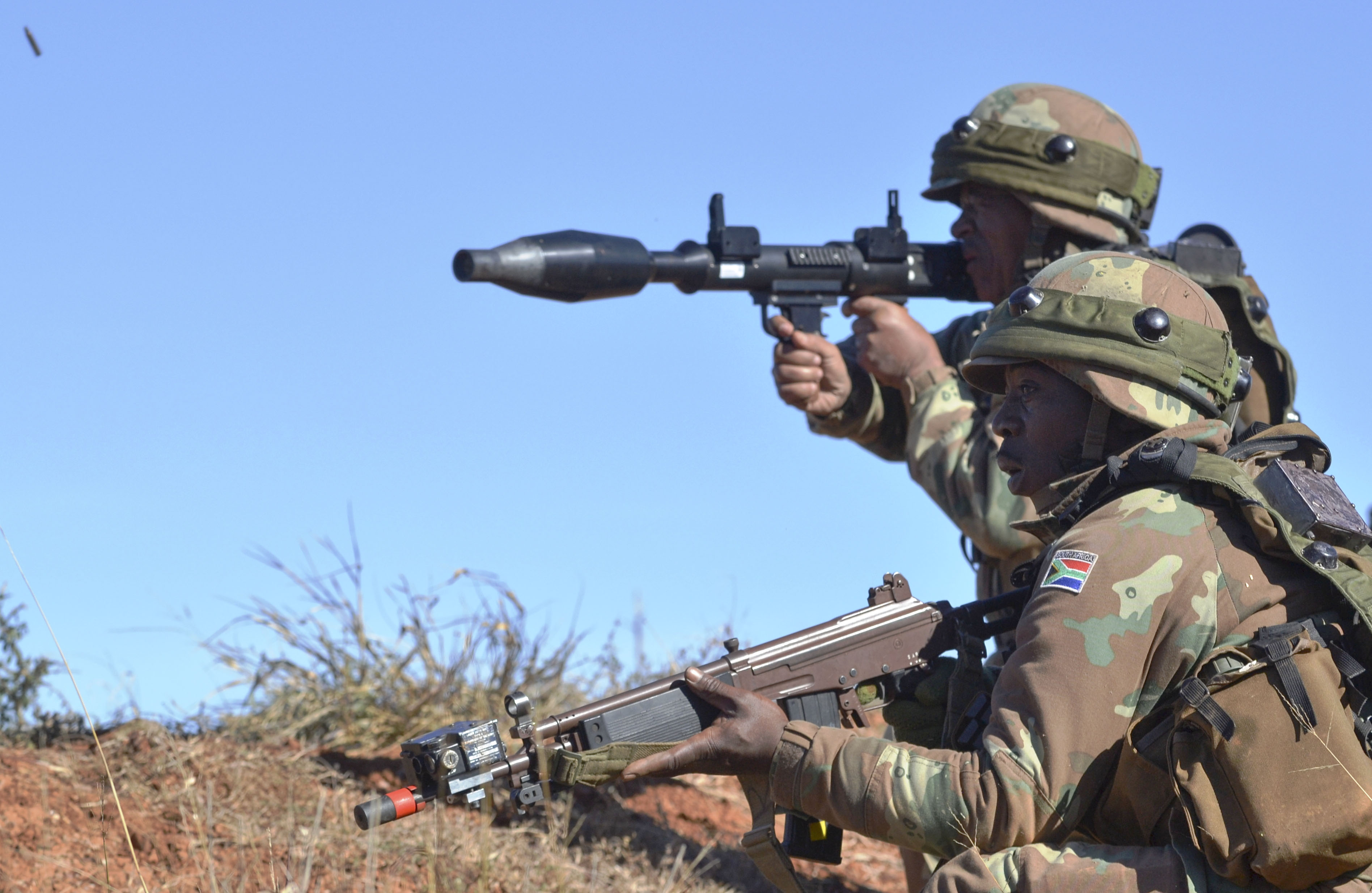

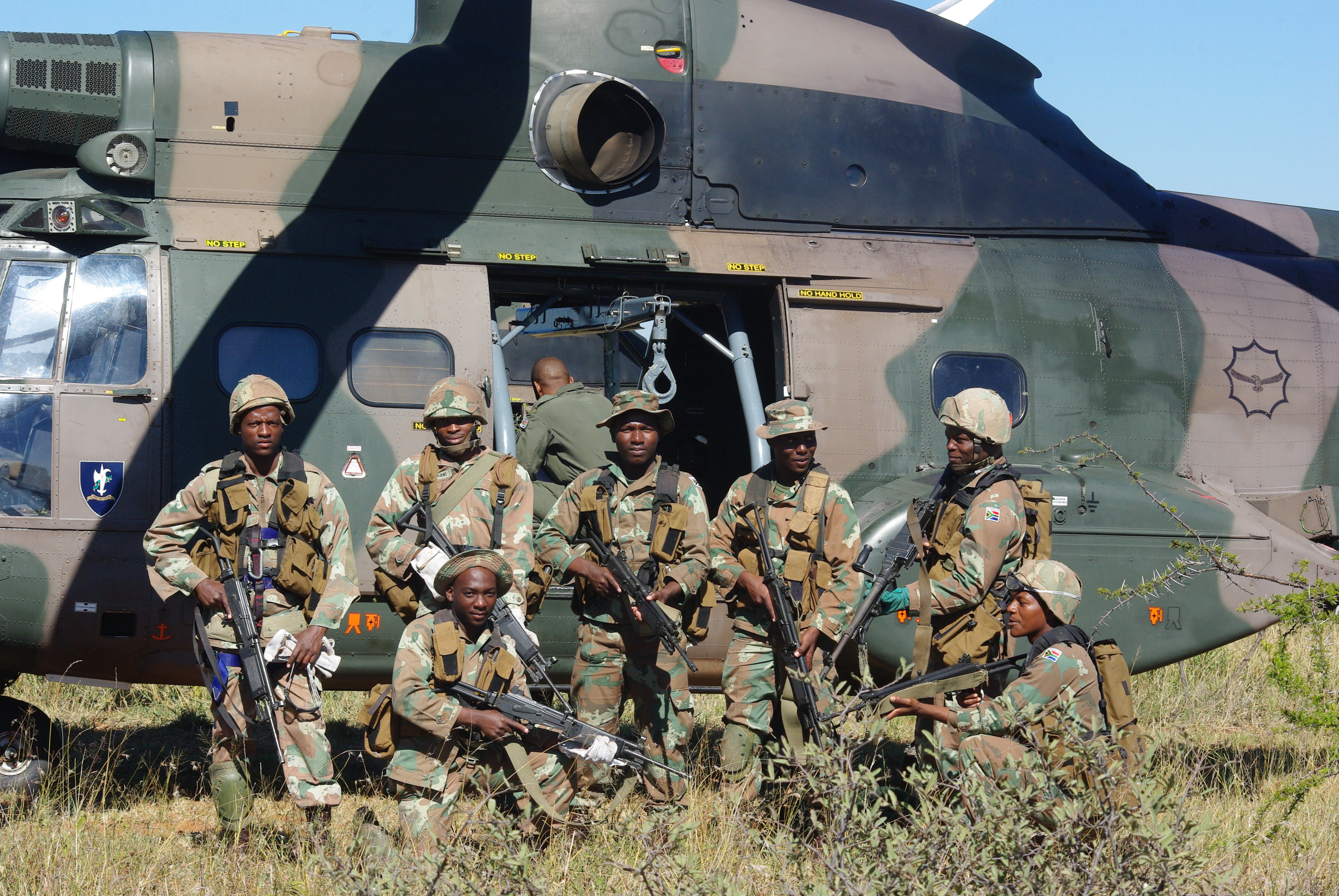

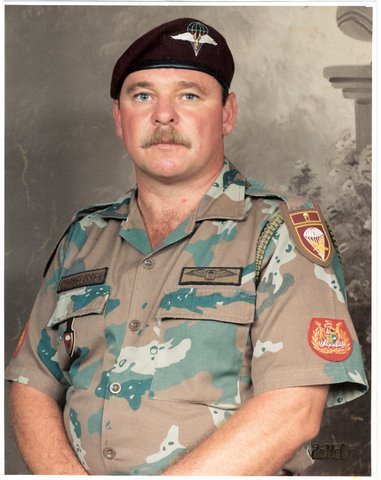
