= Husky VMMD =

South African military light tactical vehicle

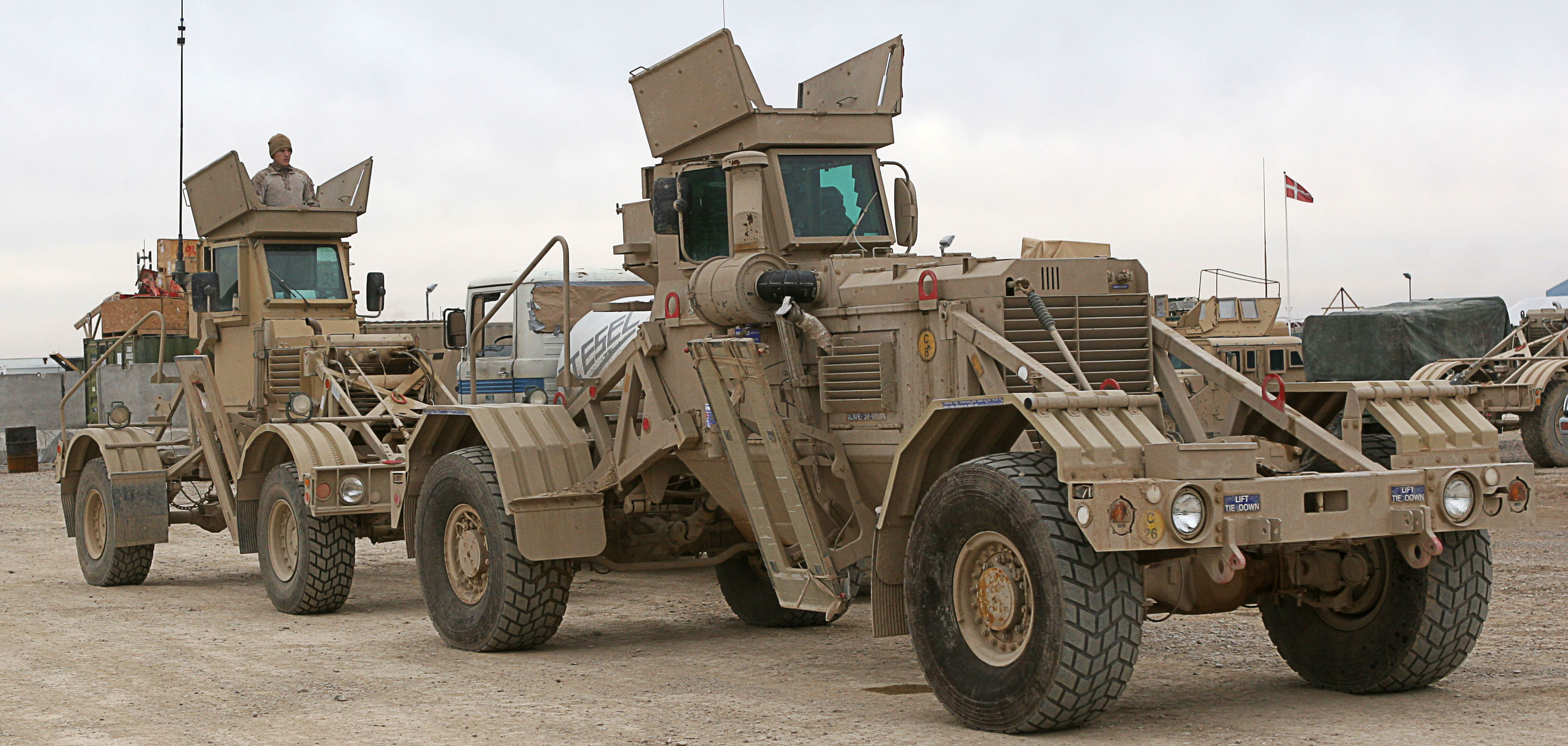
- Type: MRAP
- Place of origin: South Africa

Service history
- In service: 1970s–present

Production history
- Manufacturer: DCD Group; Critical Solutions International
- Produced: 1970s–present

Specifications
- Mass: 18,408 to 19,841 lb (8,350 to 9,000 kg) curb weight, 20,282 to 25,022 lb (9,200 to 11,350 kg) gross weight
- Length: 24 ft (7.34 m)
- Height: 10 ft (3.14 m)
- Crew: 1; 2 (G2 variant)
- Engine: Mercedes-Benz OM906LA 6.4L turbo diesel
- Transmission: 5-speed automatic
- Maximum speed: 45 mph (72 km/h) top speed

The Husky VMMD (Vehicle-Mounted Mine Detection) is a configurable counter-IED MRAP (Mine-Resistant Ambush Protected) vehicle, developed by South African-based DCD Protected Mobility and American C-IED company Critical Solutions International. Designed for use in route clearance and de-mining operations, the Husky is equipped with technologies to help detect explosives and minimise blast damage.

The Husky VMMD can help operators detect land mines, and improvised explosive devices (IEDs) using basic sensor equipment, and imaging systems. The Husky is equipped with countermeasures like jamming systems in an attempt to help disrupt the effect of IEDs. The Husky's armour is also able to withstand damage from basic explosives.

== Development ==
The Husky traces its lineage to the Pookie, a Rhodesian mine clearance vehicle.

Originally used as the lead element of a mine removal convoy, the Husky was employed as part of the Chubby mine detection system. The early Chubby system comprised a lead detection vehicle (the Meerkat), a second proofing vehicle (the Husky) towing a mine detonation trailer, and a third vehicle carrying spare parts for expedient blast repair.

The Husky was initially deployed in the 1970s. During the South African Border War, the South African Defense Force used the Husky extensively to clear mines from military convoy routes in Namibia and Angola.

In the mid-1990s, DCD Group and Critical Solutions International planned to bring the technology to the U.S. and underwent a two-year foreign comparative test program with the United States Department of Defense and follow-on modifications and testing. In 1997, CSI was directed to produce and deliver production systems under the U.S. Army Interim Vehicle Mounted Mine Detection Program.

Over the next twenty years, the Husky underwent several iterations and upgrades. U.S. military clearance units currently train on and employ Husky vehicles as detection assets and clearance vehicles.

== Design ==
The Husky is part of a class of MRAP vehicles developed from South African blast protection designs.

The sharp V-hull of the Husky helps reduces blast effect by increasing ground clearance and standoff from the blast, increasing structural hull rigidity, and diverting blast energy and fragmentation away from the platform and its occupants.

The Husky is designed to break apart in a blast event, allowing energy to transfer to the detachable front and rear modules rather than the critical components of the vehicle or the occupants located in the cab. Its three main components (a center cab with front and rear wheel modules) are connected by shear pins.

Critical components are engineered to break apart predictably, to help prevent catastrophic damage, and enabling users to quickly replace modules on site. This approach increases the lifespan of the vehicle and limits the need for recovery teams to evacuate the vehicle to maintenance facilities.

The cabin of the Husky is fitted with bulletproof glass windows. There is an entry hatch on the roof.

The Husky Mk III and 2G are powered by a Mercedes-Benz OM906LA turbo diesel engine coupled with an Allison Transmission 2500 SP 5-speed automatic transmission. It can reach a maximum speed of 72 km/h, and has a range of 350 km.

== Variants ==
=== Husky Mk I ===
First Husky production model. Replaced by Husky Mk II.

=== Husky Mk II ===
Second Husky model. Replaced by Husky Mk III.

=== Husky Mk III ===
Modern single-occupant Husky model. The platform is integrated with pulse induction metal detector panels and overpass tires that enable operators to regulate tire air pressure in order to reduce the risk of initiating land mines without causing detonation. The Mk III, like other Husky models, is engineered in a modular, frangible configuration.

=== Husky 2G ===
==== Project Type ====
- Mine clearance vehicle

==== Manufacturer ====
- DCD Protected Mobility

==== Crew ====
- Two

==== Operating Weight ====
- 9,200kg

Husky 2G is a two-seat variant of Husky MK III vehicle mounted mine detector (VMMD) designed and manufactured by South African firm DCD Protected Mobility (DCD PM). Equipped with a number of sensors, the vehicle is ideally suited for mine-clearing operations including detection, identification and destruction of improvised explosive devices (IED), landmines and other explosive materials.

Development of the Husky 2G was prompted by the need to conduct longer missions and employ multiple detection systems. The Husky 2G was designed with added high sensitivity detectors, ground-penetrating radar, video optics suites, and remote weapon stations. These additional components required a second operator to manage the additional workload, hence the required two occupants.

== Equipment ==
The Husky is capable of carrying the following equipment and payloads:

- Autonomous vehicle upgrades
- Rocket-propelled grenade armor and netting
- Smoke grenade launchers
- Electronic countermeasures
- Remote weapon station
- Metal detectors
- Ground-penetrating radar
- Nonlinear junction detectors
- Gunfire detectors
- Robotic arms
- Blowers
- Water diggers
- Thermal cameras
- Optics suite
- Mine-clearing line charges
- Mine rollers
- Rhino Passive Infrared Defeat System
- Mine plows
- Proofing rollers
- Electrostatic discharge
- Red Pack repair kit

== Operators ==
=== Husky Mk III ===
- United States Army
- United States Marine Corps
- Canadian Army
- Australian Army
- South African Defense Force
- Kenyan Army

=== Husky 2G ===
- Islamic Republic of Iran Army
- Iraqi Army
- Turkish Army
- Spanish Army
- Royal Saudi Land Forces
- Egyptian Army
- Jordanian Army
- Latvian Army
- United States Army (limited fielding in support of Operation Enduring Freedom)

== Recognitions ==
The Husky was listed on the U.S. Army’s Top Ten inventions of 2010.
