= Meerkat (disambiguation) =

A meerkat is a small mammal.

Meerkat may also refer to:

- Meerkat (app), a live-streaming mobile application
- Meerkat (vehicle), a mine-detection vehicle
- MeerKAT, a radio telescope in South Africa

== See also ==
- Compare the Meerkat, a UK advertising campaign
- Maverick Meerkat, an Ubuntu release
- Meerkat Manor, a British television programme
- Mercat cross, the Scots name for a market cross
  - Mercat Cross, Edinburgh
