= Route clearance (IEDs) =

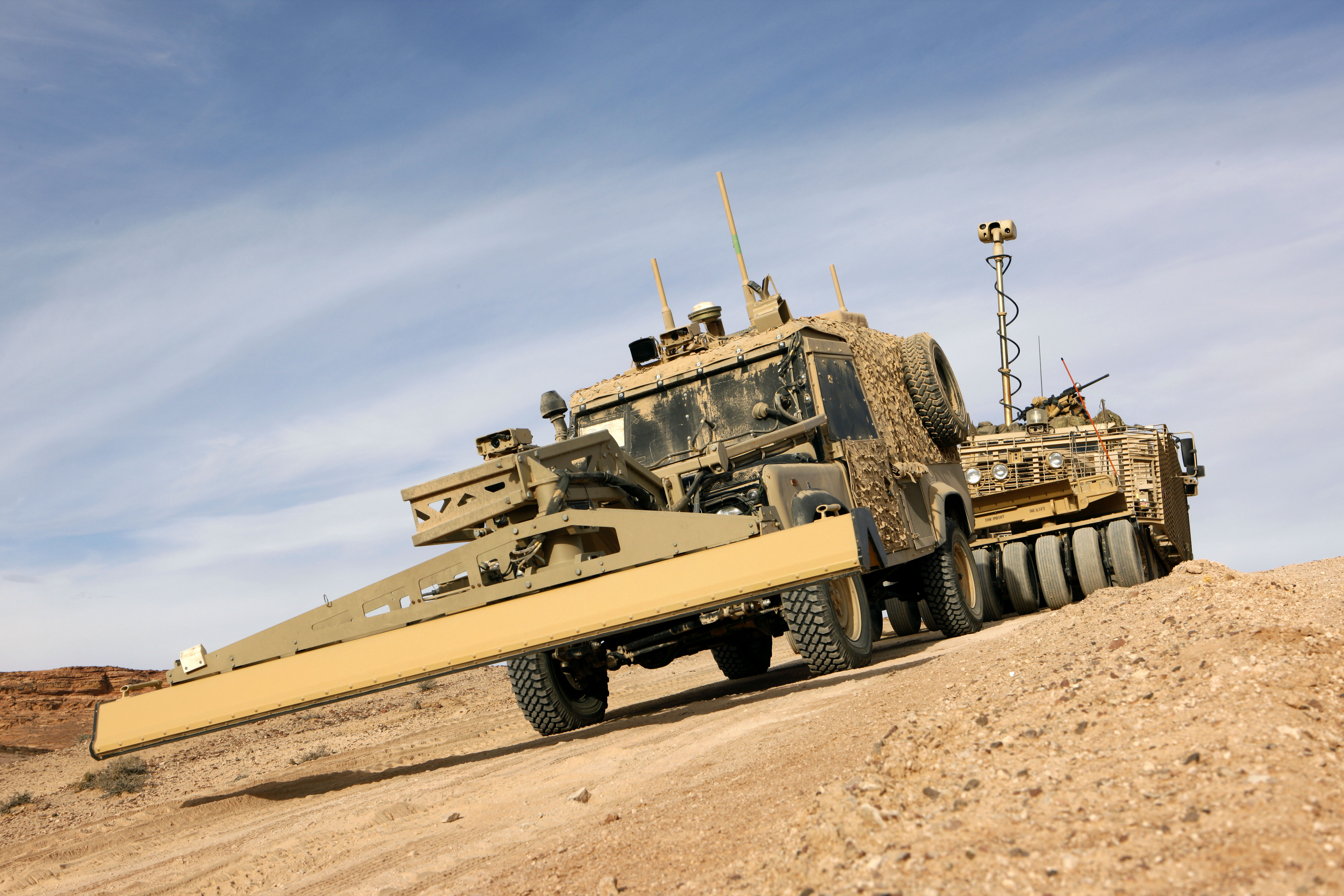
Remote-control "Panama" Land Rover with ground-penetrating radar to detect IEDs followed by Mastiff with Choker mine rollers

Route clearance is a routine part of counter-IED efforts performed by military forces around the world. The purpose of route clearance is to secure an important route and render it for safe transport. This mission relies on sapper and EOD forces. Although mines have been used in warfare for years, the rise of IEDs in current conflicts has led to the development of the current route clearance doctrine.

A typical route clearance package (RCP) consists of a sapper platoon, EOD team, at least one medic, and HEMTT wrecker staffed by a team of mechanics. RCPs are clearly recognized by troops as they use the Husky vehicle-mounted mine detector, as well as the Buffalo (mine protected vehicle). While these vehicles provide superb protection and are critical in finding and destroying IEDs they are unarmed, so the rest of the platoon must protect them while in operation. Moreover, the loss of the Buffalo or the Husky vehicles would greatly reduce the counter-IED potential of the RCP as it would no longer possess the capability to locate or remove IEDs with high effectively resorting to secondary options such as using remote controlled vehicles, using standard MRAPs equipped with digging tools in place of the Buffalo, and dismounted foot patrols to locate the trigger points in known danger areas.

In the Israel Defense Forces (IDF), route clearance is done by Combat Engineering Corps soldiers, either by EOD operators and trackers on foot or by IDF Caterpillar D9 armored bulldozers backed by armored fighting vehicles.

== Afghanistan ==
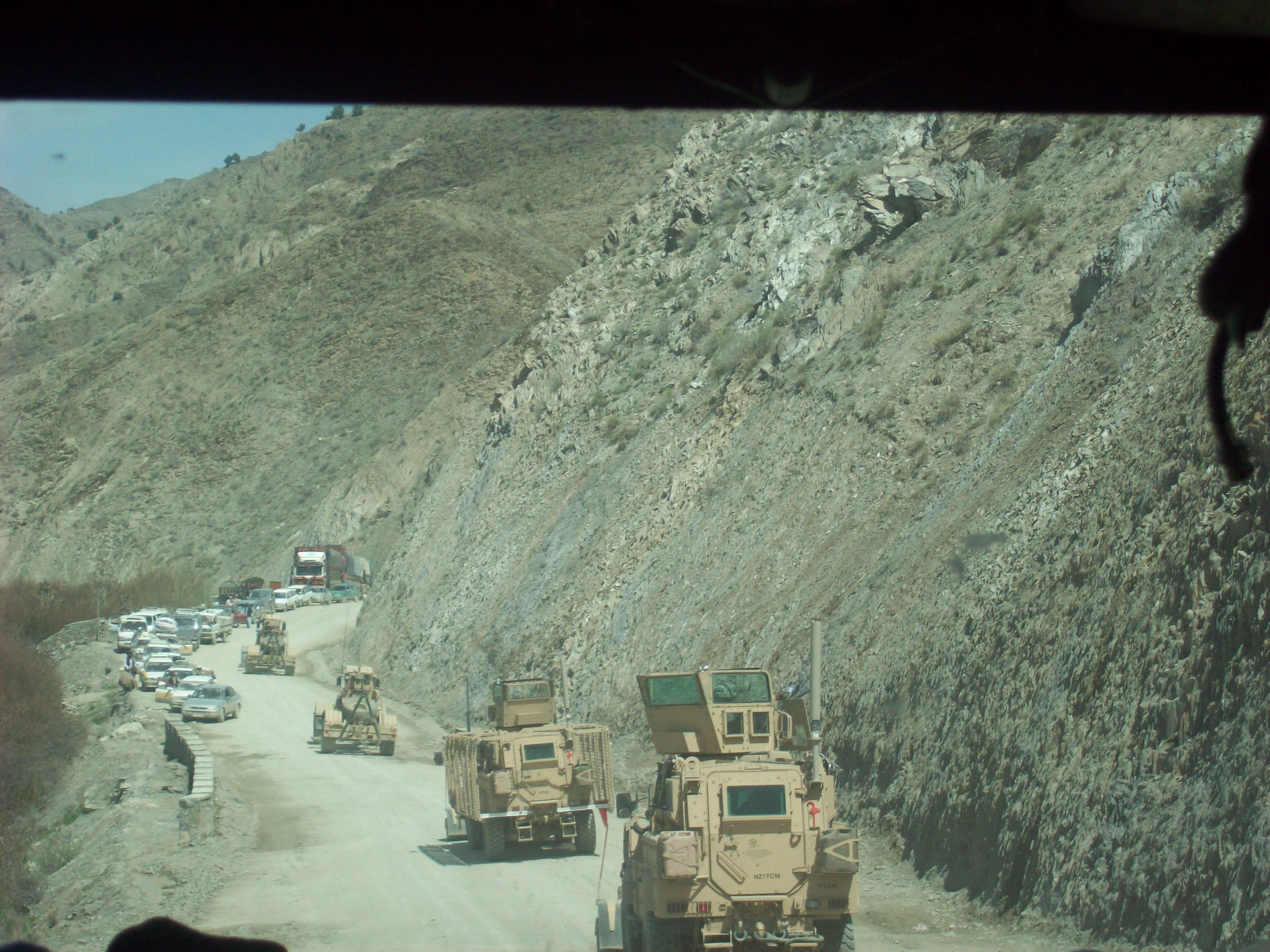
1431st Company, deployed as part of the 168th Engineer Brigade, conducts a route clearance patrol through the Khost-Gardez Pass in eastern Afghanistan. Husky mine detector vehicles lead the convoy.

US forces entered the war in Afghanistan in 2001. Although there was fierce fighting such as the Battle of Tora Bora and Operation Anaconda, the IED threat remained generally low until later in the war. Afghanistan is a rural country with rough terrain, most of the roads are unimproved and due to the abundance of rivers many culverts are present. Because of this IED threats were numerous. Typical tactics included placing high yield IEDs weighing several hundred pounds deep underground to inflict massive damage. Modern MRAP vehicles are capable of withholding most blasts. Another tactic involved placing small IEDs at choke points; their vehicle disabled, passing troops were vulnerable to ambush. Due to the decade long Soviet–Afghan War many Soviet mines are still used by Taliban fighters to make IEDs. RCPs are not designated units and are normally brought together from existing Combat Engineer and EOD units. They are then deployed to areas of need. Not all parts of Afghanistan are equally covered by RCPs, for example the remote FOB Salerno near Khost housed RCP7 and RCP9 and RCP13 which were composed of National Guard sappers and active duty EOD personnel, on the other hand Gradez had no dedicated RCP units and relied on nearby units from FOB Salerno, FOB Shank, and Orgun-E.

== 2003 invasion of Iraq ==
Unlike Afghanistan threats of IEDs evolved almost instantly after the invasion. MRAPs were largely developed for the Iraq war even though the war in Afghanistan was already several years old by the time first troops stepped on Iraqi soil. Iraq was much more urban, Iraq also had many paved highways. The insurgents in Iraq relied much more on EFPs, contrary in Afghanistan EFPs never became prevalent. An EFP is capable of slicing through several inches of armor by forming a projected missile, once the armor is penetrated the EFP often kills the crew due to the heat associated with the blast.

== See also ==
- Counter-IED efforts
- Bomb disposal
- Sapper
- Combined Joint Task Force Paladin
