= Combined Joint Task Force Paladin =

- Active: July 2005 – December 2013
- Country: Contributing States: See Below
- Allegiance: (NATO) North Atlantic Treaty Organization
- Part of: International Security Assistance Force American contingent responsible to: US Forces-Afghanistan
- Headquarters: Bagram Airfield, Afghanistan
- Engagements: Global war on terrorism: War in Afghanistan (2001–2021)

Combined Joint Task Force Paladin ("CJTF Paladin") was the International Security Assistance Force command responsible for counter-IED efforts and Explosive Ordnance Disposal (EOD) during the War in Afghanistan (2001–2021). With military and civilian personnel spread throughout the country, CJTF Paladin provided EOD Technicians, counter-IED trainers, intelligence personnel, technical and tactical exploitation capabilities, CIED forensics, and law enforcement consultants to Coalition Forces across Afghanistan.

CJTF Paladin was established in 2005 to focus Counter-IED efforts due to the rising trend of improvised explosive devices during the conflict under the command of US Army COL Roy (Chuck) Waggoner. During the draw-down of troops and the end of the combat mission for NATO forces, CJTF Paladin was deactivated in December 2013, passing responsibility for all counter-IED operations to the ISAF Joint Command (IJC) Counter IED division. Tactical operations continued to be tasked to the 242nd Ordnance Battalion (EOD) who were enhanced with additional EOD personnel and placed under the operational control of the IJC C-IED division.

Its counterpart in the Iraq War was Task Force Troy.

== See also ==
- Participants in Operation Enduring Freedom
- Bomb disposal
- Improvised explosive device
- Joint Improvised Explosive Device Defeat Organization
- Counter-IED efforts
- Route clearance (IEDs)
- Resolute Support Mission
- Task Force Sparta
