= Meerkat (vehicle) =

South African mine-detecting vehicle

The Meerkat is the lead vehicle in the Interim Vehicle Mounted Mine Detector VMMD system, which evolved from a system known as Chubby.

The first units were delivered in 1998.

The system is manufactured by the Rolling Stock Division (RSD) of DCD-Dorbyl, a mechanical engineering conglomerate in South Africa.

The Meerkat resembles a cross between a dune buggy and a grader, with a pair of horizontally mounted rectangular panels, one each side, where the grader's blade would be.

The Meerkat is intended only to detect land mines - the related Husky and its trailers are intended to dispose of detected mines.

With its tire pressures lowered, the Meerkat produces a relatively low pressure on the ground below the tires, enabling it to pass over pressure-sensitive mines designed to destroy heavy vehicles. Even if it detonates a mine, the floor of the driver's cabin is armored and the structural components are designed to be quickly replaced.
