= South African Border War =

1966–1990 war between South Africa and PLAN

- Part of the Cold War, spillover of the Angolan Civil War and the decolonisation of Africa
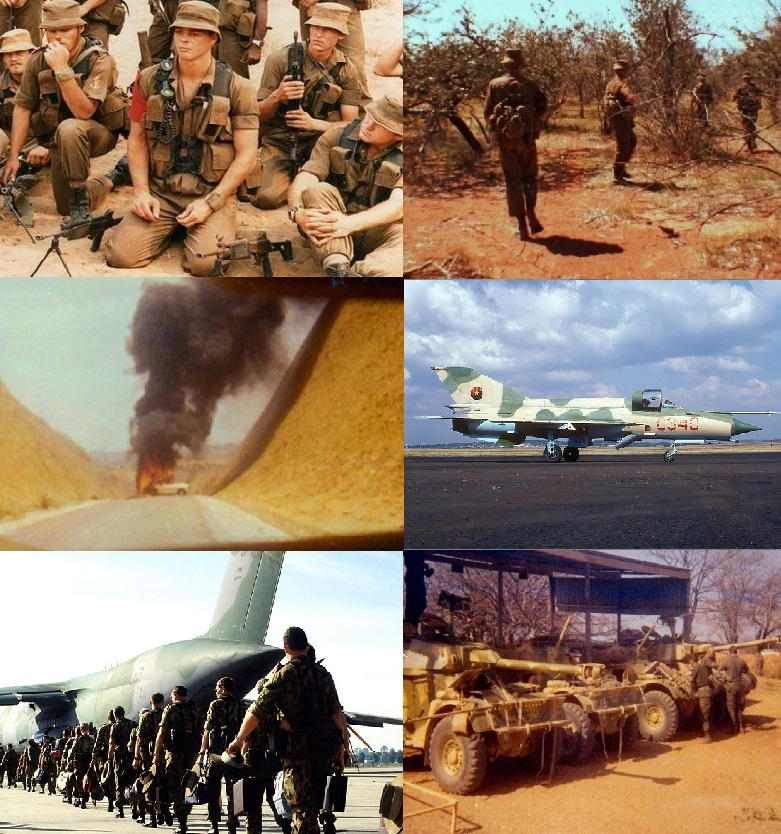
- Clockwise from top left: South African Marines stage for an operation in the Caprivi Strip, 1984; an SADF patrol searches the "Cutline" for PLAN insurgents; FAPLA MiG-21bis seized by the SADF in 1988; SADF armoured cars prepare to cross into Angola during Operation Savannah; UNTAG peacekeepers deploy prior to the 1989 Namibian elections; a FAPLA staff car destroyed in an SADF ambush, late 1975.
Date	26 August 1966 – 21 March 1990 (23 years, 4 months, 2 weeks and 6 days)
Location	South West Africa (Namibia), Angola, Zambia
Result	Military stalemate: Angolan Tripartite Accord, leading to: Withdrawal of South African forces from Namibia; withdrawal of Cuban forces from Angola; 1989 Namibian parliamentary elections; SWAPO government assuming power in Namibia
Territorial changes	South West Africa gains independence from South Africa as the Republic of Namibia

Belligerents
South Africa: TGNU (1985–1989); Portugal (until 1974); UNITA (from 1975); FNLA (1975)	SWAPO (PLAN); MPLA (FAPLA); Cuba; SWANU; ANC (MK); Zambia; Military advisers and pilots: Soviet Union; East Germany

Commanders and leaders
Gerrit Viljoen; Willie van Niekerk; Louis Pienaar; B. J. Vorster; P. W. Botha; F. W. de Klerk; Constand Viljoen; Johannes Geldenhuys; Magnus Malan; Andreas Liebenberg; Georg Meiring; Cornelius Ndjoba X; Jonas Savimbi; Holden Roberto	Sam Nujoma; Tobias Hainyeko †; Peter Nanyemba; Dimo Hamaambo; Peter Mweshihange; Solomon Huwala; Agostinho Neto; José Eduardo dos Santos; António França; Iko Carreira; Arnaldo Ochoa (executed); Fidel Castro

Strength
c. 71,000 (1988): South Africa: 30,743 SADF troops in Angola and Namibia; South West Africa: 22,000 SWATF troops; 8,300 SWAPOL police	c. 122,000 (1988): SWAPO: 32,000 PLAN guerrillas; Cuba: 40,000 FAR troops in southern Angola; Angola: 50,000 FAPLA troops

Casualties and losses
2,365–2,500 dead	11,335 dead; 2,016–5,000 dead (including Angolan Civil War deaths)
- Namibian civilians dead: 947–1,087

The South African Border War, also known as the Namibian War of Independence, and sometimes denoted in South Africa as the Angolan Bush War, was a largely asymmetric conflict that occurred in Namibia (then South West Africa), Zambia, and Angola from 26 August 1966 to 21 March 1990. It was fought between the South African Defence Force (SADF) and the People's Liberation Army of Namibia (PLAN), an armed wing of the South West African People's Organisation (SWAPO). The South African Border War was closely intertwined with the Angolan Civil War.

== Summary ==
Following several years of unsuccessful petitioning through the United Nations and the International Court of Justice for Namibian independence from South Africa, SWAPO formed the PLAN in 1962 with material assistance from the Soviet Union and sympathetic African states such as Tanzania, Ghana, and Algeria. Fighting broke out between PLAN and the South African security forces in August 1966. Between 1975 and 1988, the SADF staged massive conventional raids into Angola and Zambia to eliminate PLAN's forward operating bases. It also deployed specialist counter-insurgency units such as Koevoet and 32 Battalion, trained to carry out external reconnaissance and track guerrilla movements.

South African tactics became increasingly aggressive as the conflict progressed. The SADF's incursions produced Angolan casualties and occasionally resulted in severe collateral damage to economic installations regarded as vital to the Angolan economy. Ostensibly to stop these raids, but also to disrupt the growing alliance between the SADF and the National Union for the Total Independence of Angola (UNITA), which the former was arming with captured PLAN equipment, the Soviet Union backed the People's Armed Forces of Liberation of Angola (FAPLA) through a large contingent of military advisers, along with up to four billion dollars' worth of modern defence technology in the 1980s. Beginning in 1984, regular Angolan units under Soviet command were confident enough to confront the SADF. Their positions were also bolstered by thousands of Cuban troops. The state of war between South Africa and Angola briefly ended with the short-lived Lusaka Accords, but resumed in August 1985 as both PLAN and UNITA took advantage of the ceasefire to intensify their own guerrilla activity, leading to a renewed phase of FAPLA combat operations culminating in the Battle of Cuito Cuanavale. The South African Border War was virtually ended by the Tripartite Accord, mediated by the United States, which committed to a withdrawal of Cuban and South African military personnel from Angola and South West Africa, respectively. PLAN launched its final guerrilla campaign in April 1989. South West Africa received formal independence as the Republic of Namibia a year later, on 21 March 1990.

Despite being largely fought in neighbouring states, the South African Border War had a significant cultural and political impact on South African society. The country's apartheid government devoted considerable effort towards presenting the war as part of a containment programme against regional Soviet expansionism and used it to stoke public anti-communist sentiment. It remains an integral theme in contemporary South African literature at large and Afrikaans-language works in particular, having given rise to a unique genre known as grensliteratuur (directly translated "border literature").

== Nomenclature ==
Various names have been applied to the undeclared conflict waged by South Africa in Angola and Namibia (then South West Africa) from the mid 1960s to the late 1980s. The term "South African Border War" has typically denoted the military campaign launched by the People's Liberation Army of Namibia (PLAN), which took the form of sabotage and rural insurgency, as well as the external raids launched by South African troops on suspected PLAN bases inside Angola or Zambia. These occasionally provoked conventional engagements with the Zambian National Defence Force (ZNDF) and the People's Armed Forces of Liberation of Angola (FAPLA). The strategic situation was further complicated by the fact that South Africa occupied large swathes of Angola for extended periods in support of the National Union for the Total Independence of Angola (UNITA), making the "Border War" an increasingly inseparable conflict from the parallel Angolan Civil War.

"Border War" entered public discourse in South Africa during the late 1970s; the term was adopted thereafter by the country's ruling National Party. Due to the covert nature of most South African Defence Force (SADF) operations inside Angola, the term was favoured as a means of omitting any reference to engagements on foreign soil. Where tactical aspects of various engagements were discussed, some contemporary historians simply identified the conflict as the "bush war".

The so-called "border war" of the 1970s and 1980s was not actually a war at all by classic standards. At the same time it eludes exact definitions. The core of it was a protracted insurgency in South West Africa, later South-West Africa/Namibia and still later Namibia. At the same time it was characterised by the periodical involvement of the SADF in the long civil war taking place in neighbouring Angola, because the two conflicts could not be separated from one another.

— Willem Steenkamp, South African military historian

The South West African People's Organisation (SWAPO) has described the South African Border War as the Namibian War of National Liberation and the Namibian Liberation Struggle. In the Namibian context, it is also commonly referred to as the Namibian War of Independence. However, these terms have been criticised for ignoring the wider regional implications of the war and the fact that most of the fighting took place in countries other than Namibia.

== Background ==
Namibia was governed as German South West Africa, a colony of the German Empire, until World War I, when it was invaded and occupied by Allied forces under General Louis Botha. Following the Armistice of 11 November 1918, a mandate system was imposed by the League of Nations to govern African and Asian territories held by Germany and the Ottoman Empire prior to the war. The mandate system was formed as a compromise between those who advocated an Allied annexation of former German and Turkish territories, and another proposal put forward by those who wished to grant the territories to an international trusteeship until they could govern themselves.

All former German and Turkish territories were classified into three types of mandates – Class "A" mandates, predominantly in the Middle East; Class "B" mandates, which encompassed central Africa; and Class "C" mandates, which were reserved for the most sparsely populated or least developed German colonies: South West Africa, German New Guinea, and the Pacific islands.

Owing to their small size, geographic remoteness, low population density, or physical contiguity to the mandatory power itself, Class "C" mandates could be administered as integral provinces of the countries to which they were entrusted. Nevertheless, the bestowal of a mandate by the League of Nations did not confer full sovereignty, only the responsibility of administering it. In principle, mandating countries were only supposed to hold these former colonies "in trust" for their inhabitants, until they were sufficiently prepared for their own self-determination. Under these terms, Japan, Australia, and New Zealand were granted the German Pacific islands, and the Union of South Africa received South West Africa.

It soon became apparent the South African government had interpreted the mandate as a veiled annexation. In September 1922, South African Prime Minister Jan Smuts testified before the League of Nations Mandate Commission that South West Africa was being fully incorporated into the Union and should be regarded, for all practical purposes, as a fifth province of South Africa. According to Smuts, this constituted "annexation in all but in name".

Throughout the 1920s and 1930s, the League of Nations complained that of all the mandatory powers South Africa was the most delinquent with regards to observing the terms of its mandate. The Mandate Commission vetoed a number of ambitious South African policy decisions, such as proposals to nationalise South West African railways or alter the preexisting borders. Sharp criticism was also leveled at South Africa's disproportionate spending on the local white population, which the former defended as obligatory since white South West Africans were taxed the heaviest. The League adopted the argument that no one segment of any mandate's population was entitled to favourable treatment over another, and the terms under which the mandate had been granted made no provision for special obligation towards whites. It pointed out that there was little evidence of progress being made towards political self-determination. Just prior to World War II, South Africa and the League remained at an impasse over this dispute.

=== Legality of South West Africa, 1946–1960 ===
After World War II, Jan Smuts headed the South African delegation to the United Nations Conference on International Organization. As a result of this conference, the League of Nations was formally superseded by the United Nations (UN) and former League mandates by a trusteeship system. Article 77 of the United Nations Charter stated that UN trusteeship "shall apply...to territories now held under mandate"; furthermore, it would "be a matter of subsequent agreement as to which territories in the foregoing territories will be brought under the trusteeship system and under what terms". Smuts was suspicious of the proposed trusteeship, largely because of the vague terminology in Article 77.

Heaton Nicholls, the South African high commissioner in the United Kingdom and a member of the Smuts delegation to the UN, addressed the newly formed UN General Assembly on 17 January 1946. Nicholls stated that the legal uncertainty of South West Africa's situation was retarding development and discouraging foreign investment; however, self-determination for the time being was impossible since the territory was too undeveloped and underpopulated to function as a strong independent state. In the second part of the first session of the General Assembly, the floor was handed to Smuts, who declared that the mandate was essentially a part of the South African territory and people. Smuts informed the General Assembly that it had already been so thoroughly incorporated with South Africa a UN-sanctioned annexation was no more than a necessary formality.

The Smuts delegation's request for the termination of the mandate and permission to annex South West Africa was not well received by the General Assembly. Five other countries, including three major colonial powers, had agreed to place their mandates under the trusteeship of the UN, at least in principle; South Africa alone refused. Most delegates insisted it was undesirable to endorse the annexation of a mandated territory, especially when all of the others had entered trusteeship. Thirty-seven member states voted to block a South African annexation of South West Africa; nine abstained.

In Pretoria, right-wing politicians reacted with outrage at what they perceived as unwarranted UN interference in the South West Africa affair. The National Party dismissed the UN as unfit to meddle with South Africa's policies or discuss its administration of the mandate. One National Party speaker, Eric Louw, demanded that South West Africa be annexed unilaterally. During the South African general election, 1948, the National Party was swept into power, newly appointed Prime Minister Daniel Malan prepared to adopt a more aggressive stance concerning annexation, and Louw was named ambassador to the UN. During an address in Windhoek, Malan reiterated his party's position that South Africa would annex the mandate before surrendering it to an international trusteeship. The following year a formal statement was issued to the General Assembly which proclaimed that South Africa had no intention of complying with trusteeship, nor was it obligated to release new information or reports pertaining to its administration. Simultaneously, the South West Africa Affairs Administration Act, 1949, was passed by South African parliament. The new legislation gave white South West Africans parliamentary representation and the same political rights as white South Africans.

The UN General Assembly responded by deferring to the International Court of Justice (ICJ), which was to issue an advisory opinion on the international status of South West Africa. The ICJ ruled that South West Africa was still being governed as a mandate; hence, South Africa was not legally obligated to surrender it to the UN trusteeship system if it did not recognise the mandate system had lapsed. Conversely, however, it was still bound by the provisions of the original mandate. Adherence to the original mandate meant South Africa could not unilaterally modify the international status of South West Africa. Malan and his government rejected the court's opinion as irrelevant. The UN formed a Committee on South West Africa, which issued its own independent reports regarding the administration and development of that territory. The Committee's reports became increasingly scathing of South African officials when the National Party imposed its harsh system of racial segregation and stratification—apartheid—on South West Africa.

In 1958, the UN established a Good Offices Committee which continued to invite South Africa to bring South West Africa under trusteeship. The Good Offices Committee proposed a partition of the mandate, allowing South Africa to annex the southern portion while either granting independence to the north, including the densely populated Ovamboland region, or administering it as an international trust territory. The proposal met with overwhelming opposition in the General Assembly; fifty-six nations voted against it. Any further partition of South West Africa was rejected out of hand.

=== Internal opposition to South African rule ===
Mounting internal opposition to apartheid played an instrumental role in the development and militancy of a South West African nationalist movement throughout the mid to late 1950s. The 1952 Defiance Campaign, a series of nonviolent protests launched by the African National Congress against pass laws, inspired the formation of South West African student unions also opposed to apartheid. In 1955, their members organised the South West African Progressive Association (SWAPA), chaired by Uatja Kaukuetu, to campaign for South West African independence. Although SWAPA did not garner widespread support beyond intellectual circles, it was the first nationalist body claiming to support the interests of all black South West Africans, irrespective of tribe or language. SWAPA's activists were predominantly Herero students, schoolteachers, and other members of the emerging black intelligentsia in Windhoek.

Meanwhile, the Ovamboland People's Congress (later the Ovamboland People's Organisation, or OPO) was formed by nationalists among partly urbanised migrant Ovambo labourers in Cape Town, South Africa. The OPO's constitution cited the achievement of a UN trusteeship and ultimate South West African independence as its primary goals. A unified movement was proposed that would include the politicisation of Ovambo contract workers from northern South West Africa as well as the Herero students; this resulted in the unification of SWAPA and the OPO as the South West African National Union (SWANU) on 27 September 1959.

In December 1959, the South African government announced that it would forcibly relocate all residents of Old Location, a black neighbourhood located near Windhoek's city center, in accordance with apartheid legislation. SWANU responded by organising mass demonstrations and a bus boycott on 10 December. In the ensuing confrontation South African police opened fire, killing eleven protestors. After the Old Location incident, the OPO split from SWANU, citing differences with the organisation's Herero leadership. Because the UN and potential foreign supporters reacted sensitively to any implications of tribalism and had favoured SWANU for its claim to represent the South West African people as a whole, the OPO renamed itself the South West African People's Organisation. It later opened its ranks to all South West Africans sympathetic to its aims.

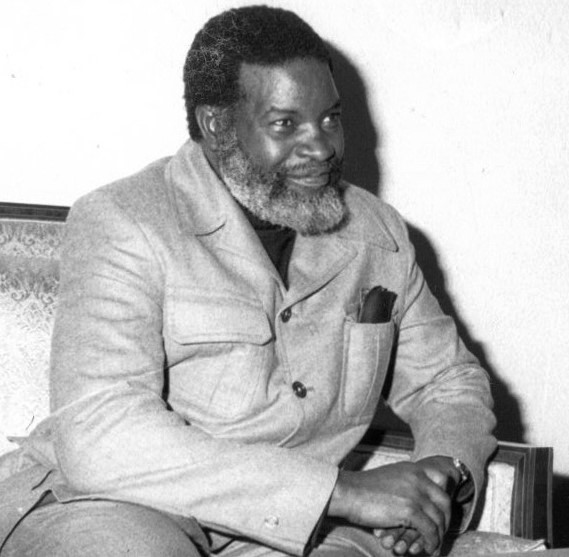
Sam Nujoma, key founder and leader of SWAPO and its OPO predecessor.

SWAPO leaders soon went abroad to mobilise support for their goals within the international community and newly independent African states in particular. The movement scored a major diplomatic success when it was recognised by Tanganyika and allowed to open an office in Dar es Salaam. SWAPO's first manifesto, released in July 1960, was remarkably similar to SWANU's. Both advocated the abolition of colonialism and all forms of racialism, the promotion of Pan-Africanism, and called for the "economic, social, and cultural advancement" of South West Africans. However, SWAPO went a step further by demanding immediate independence under black majority rule, to be granted at a date no later than 1963. The SWAPO manifesto also promised universal suffrage, sweeping welfare programmes, free healthcare, free public education, the nationalisation of all major industry, and the forcible redistribution of foreign-owned land "in accordance with African communal ownership principles".

Compared to SWANU, SWAPO's potential for wielding political influence within South West Africa was limited, and it was accordingly likelier to accept armed insurrection as the primary means of achieving its goals. SWAPO leaders also argued that a decision to take up arms against the South Africans would demonstrate their superior commitment to the nationalist cause. They believed that this would distinguish SWAPO from SWANU in the eyes of international supporters as the genuine vanguard of the Namibian independence struggle, and the legitimate recipient of any material assistance that was forthcoming.

Modelled after Umkhonto we Sizwe, the armed wing of the African National Congress, the South West African Liberation Army (SWALA) was formed by SWAPO in 1962. The first seven SWALA recruits were sent from Dar es Salaam to Egypt and the Soviet Union, where they received military instruction. Upon their return, they began training guerrillas at a makeshift camp established for housing South West African refugees in Kongwa, Tanzania.

=== Cold War tensions and the border militarisation ===
The increasing likelihood of armed conflict in South West Africa had strong international foreign policy implications, for both Western Europe and the Soviet bloc. Prior to the late 1950s, South Africa's defence policy had been influenced by international Cold War politics, including the domino theory and fears of a conventional Soviet military threat to the strategic Cape trade route between the south Atlantic and Indian oceans. Noting that the country had become the world's principal source of uranium, the South African Department of External Affairs reasoned that "on this account alone, therefore, South Africa is bound to be implicated in any war between East and West". Prime Minister Malan took the position that colonial Africa was being directly threatened by the Soviets, or at least by Soviet-backed communist agitation, and this was only likely to increase whatever the result of another European war. Malan promoted an African Pact, similar to NATO, headed by South Africa and the Western colonial powers accordingly. The concept failed due to international opposition to apartheid and suspicion of South African military overtures in the British Commonwealth.

South Africa's participation in the Korean War produced a significant warming of relations between Malan and the United States, despite American criticism of apartheid. Until the early 1960s, South African strategic and military support was considered an integral component of U.S. foreign policy in Africa's southern subcontinent, and there was a steady flow of defence technology from Washington to Pretoria. American and Western European interest in the defence of Africa from a hypothetical, external communist invasion dissipated after it became clear that the nuclear arms race was making global conventional war increasingly less likely. Emphasis shifted towards preventing communist subversion and infiltration via proxy rather than overt Soviet aggression. American support to South Africa was predicated on the ability of South Africa to prevent wider communist insurgency from growing in the region.

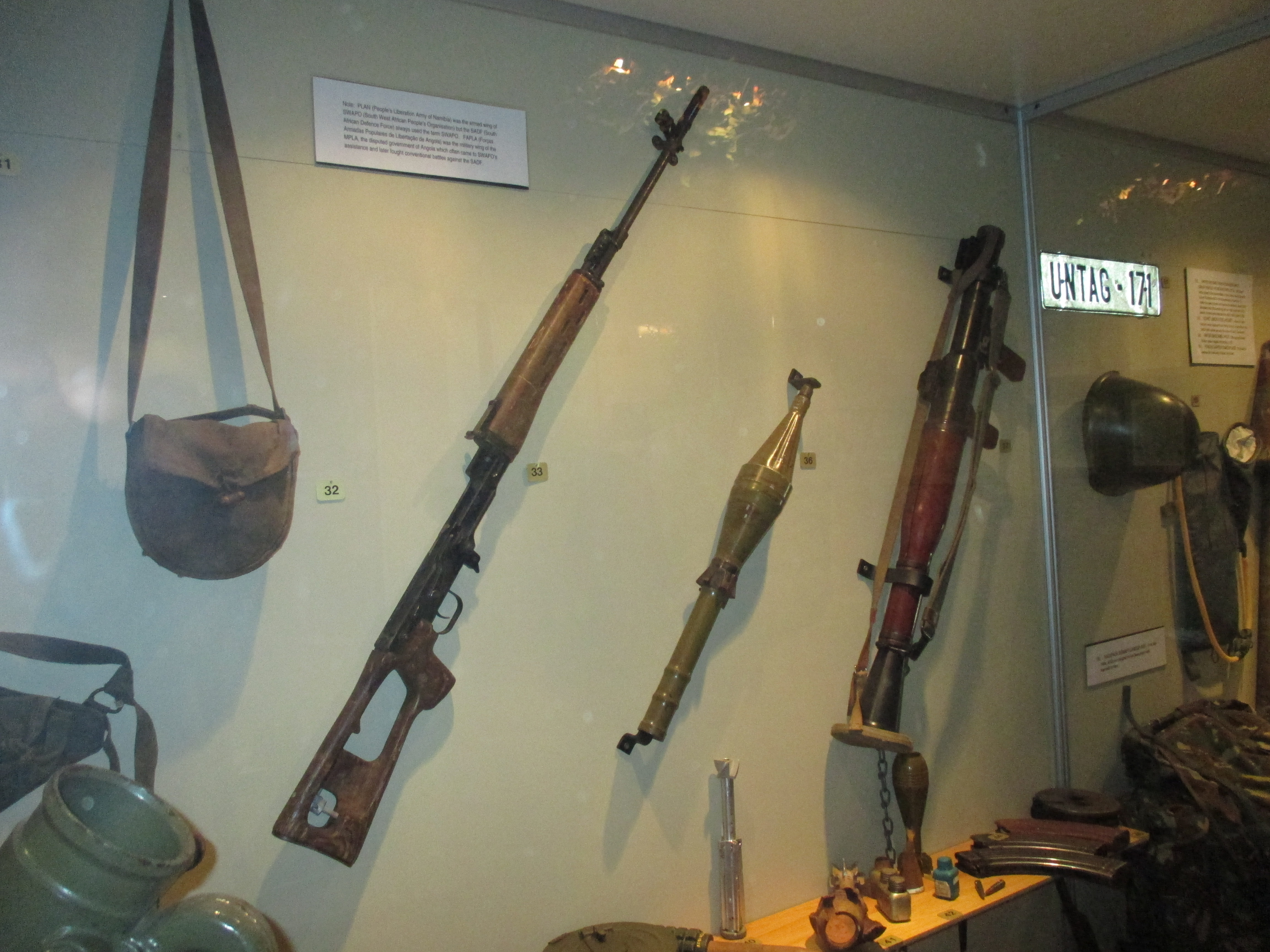
Equipment of Soviet origin supplied to SWAPO. From left to right: satchel, Dragunov sniper rifle, PG-7V RPG projectile, and RPG-7 launcher.

The advent of global decolonisation and the subsequent rise in prominence of the Soviet Union among several newly independent African states was viewed with wariness by the South African government. National Party politicians began warning it would be only a matter of time before they were faced with a Soviet-directed insurgency on their borders. Outlying regions in South West Africa, namely the Caprivi Strip, became the focus of massive SADF air and ground training manoeuvres, as well as heightened border patrols. A year before SWAPO made the decision to send its first SWALA recruits abroad for guerrilla training, South Africa established fortified police outposts along the Caprivi Strip for the express purpose of deterring insurgents. When SWALA cadres armed with Soviet weapons and training began to make their appearance in South West Africa, the National Party believed its fears of a local Soviet proxy force had finally been realised.

The Soviet Union took a keen interest in Africa's independence movements and initially hoped that the cultivation of socialist client states on the continent would deny their economic and strategic resources to the West. Soviet training of SWALA was thus not confined to tactical matters but extended to Marxist–Leninist political theory, and the procedures for establishing an effective political-military infrastructure. In addition to training, the Soviets quickly became SWALA's leading supplier of arms and money. Weapons supplied to SWALA between 1962 and 1966 included PPSh-41 submachine guns, SKS carbines, and TT-33 pistols, which were well-suited to the insurgents' unconventional warfare strategy.

Despite its burgeoning relationship with SWAPO, the Soviet Union did not regard Southern Africa as a major strategic priority in the mid 1960s, due to its preoccupation elsewhere on the continent and in the Middle East. Nevertheless, the perception of South Africa as a regional Western ally and a bastion of neocolonialism helped fuel Soviet backing for the nationalist movement. Moscow also approved of SWAPO's decision to adopt guerrilla warfare because it was not optimistic about any solution to the South West Africa problem short of revolutionary struggle. This was in marked contrast to Western governments, which opposed the formation of SWALA and turned down the latter's requests for military aid.

== Beginning of insurgency (1964–1974) ==
=== Early guerrilla incursions ===
In November 1960, Ethiopia and Liberia had formally petitioned the ICJ for a binding judgment, rather than an advisory opinion, on whether South Africa remained fit to govern South West Africa. Both nations emphasised that they considered the implementation of apartheid to be a violation of Pretoria's obligations as a mandatory power. The National Party government rejected the claim on the grounds that Ethiopia and Liberia lacked sufficient legal interest to present a case concerning South West Africa. This argument suffered a major setback on 21 December 1962 when the ICJ ruled that, as former League of Nations member states, both parties had a right to institute the proceedings.

Around March 1962, SWAPO President Sam Nujoma visited the party's refugee camps across Tanzania, describing his recent petitions for South West African independence at the Non-Aligned Movement and the UN. He pointed out that independence was unlikely in the foreseeable future, predicting a "long and bitter struggle". Nujoma personally directed two exiles in Dar es Salaam, Lucas Pohamba and Elia Muatale, to return to South West Africa, infiltrate Ovamboland and send back more potential recruits for SWALA. Over the next few years, Pohamba and Muatale successfully recruited hundreds of volunteers from the Ovamboland countryside, most of whom were shipped to Eastern Europe for guerrilla training. Between July 1962 and October 1963 SWAPO negotiated military alliances with other anti-colonial movements, namely in Angola. It also absorbed the separatist Caprivi African National Union (CANU), which was formed to combat South African rule in the Caprivi Strip. Outside the Soviet bloc, Egypt continued training SWALA personnel. By 1964 others were also being sent to Ghana, Algeria, the People's Republic of China, and North Korea for military instruction. In June of that year, SWAPO confirmed that it was irrevocably committed to the course of armed revolution.

The formation of the Organisation of African Unity (OAU)'s Liberation Committee further strengthened SWAPO's international standing and ushered in an era of unprecedented political decline for SWANU. The Liberation Committee had obtained approximately £20,000 in obligatory contributions from OAU member states; these funds were offered to both South West African nationalist movements. However, as SWANU was unwilling to guarantee its share of the £20,000 would be used for armed struggle, this grant was awarded to SWAPO instead. The OAU subsequently withdrew recognition from SWANU, leaving SWAPO as the sole beneficiary of pan-African legitimacy. With OAU assistance, SWAPO opened diplomatic offices in Lusaka, Cairo, and London. SWANU belatedly embarked on a ten-year programme to raise its own guerrilla army.

In September 1965, the first unit of six SWALA guerrillas, identified simply as "Group 1", departed the Kongwa refugee camp to infiltrate South West Africa. Group 1 trekked first into Angola, before crossing the border into the Caprivi Strip. Encouraged by South Africa's apparent failure to detect the initial incursion, larger insurgent groups made their own infiltration attempts in February and March 1966. The second unit, "Group 2", was led by Leonard Philemon Shuuya, also known by the nom de guerre "Castro" or "Leonard Nangolo". Group 2 apparently became lost in Angola before it was able to cross the border, and the guerrillas dispersed after an incident in which they killed two shopkeepers and a vagrant. Three were arrested by the Portuguese colonial authorities in Angola, who were working off tips received from local civilians. Another eight, including Shuuya, had been captured between March and May by the South African police, apparently in Kavangoland. Shuuya later resurfaced at Kongwa, claiming to have escaped his captors after his arrest. He helped plan two further incursions: a third SWALA group entered Ovamboland that July, while a fourth was scheduled to follow in September.

As long as we waited for the judgement at the ICJ in The Hague, the training of fighters was a precaution rather than a direct preparation for immediate action...we hoped the outcome of the case would be in our favor. As long as we had that hope, we did not want to resort to violent methods. However, the judgment let us down, and what we had prepared for as a kind of unreality, suddenly became the cold and hard reality for us. We took to arms, we had no other choice.

— Excerpt from official SWAPO communique on the ICJ ruling.

On 18 July 1966, the ICJ ruled that it had no authority to decide on the South West African affair. Furthermore, the court found that while Ethiopia and Liberia had locus standi to institute proceedings on the matter, neither had enough vested legal interest in South West Africa to entitle them to a judgement of merits. This ruling was met with great indignation by SWAPO and the OAU. SWAPO officials immediately issued a statement from Dar es Salaam declaring that they now had "no alternative but to rise in arms" and "cross rivers of blood" in their march towards freedom. Upon receiving the news, SWALA escalated its insurgency. Its third group, which had infiltrated Ovamboland in July, attacked white-owned farms, traditional Ovambo leaders perceived as South African agents, and a border post. The guerrillas set up camp at Omugulugwombashe, one of five potential bases identified by SWALA's initial reconnaissance team as appropriate sites to train future recruits. Here, they drilled up to thirty local volunteers between September 1965 and August 1966. South African intelligence became aware of the camp by mid 1966 and identified its general location. On 26 August 1966, the first major clash of the conflict took place when South African paratroops and paramilitary police units executed Operation Blouwildebees to capture or kill the insurgents. SWALA had dug trenches around Omugulugwombashe for defensive purposes, but was taken by surprise and most of the insurgents quickly overpowered. SWALA suffered 2 dead, 1 wounded, and 8 captured; the South Africans suffered no casualties. This engagement is widely regarded in South Africa as the start of the Border War, and according to SWAPO, officially marked the beginning of its revolutionary armed struggle.

Operation Blouwildebees triggered accusations of treachery within SWALA's senior ranks. According to SADF accounts, an unidentified informant had accompanied the security forces during the attack. Sam Nujoma asserted that one of the eight guerrillas from the second group who were captured in Kavangoland was a South African mole. Suspicion immediately fell on Leonard "Castro" Shuuya. SWALA suffered a second major reversal on 18 May 1967, when Tobias Hainyeko, its commander, was killed by the South African police. Heinyeko and his men had been attempting to cross the Zambezi River, as part of a general survey aimed at opening new lines of communication between the front lines in South West Africa and SWAPO's political leadership in Tanzania. They were intercepted by a South African patrol, and the ensuing firefight left Heinyeko dead and two policemen seriously wounded. Rumours again abounded that Shuuya was responsible, resulting in his dismissal and subsequent imprisonment.

In the weeks following the raid on Omugulugwombashe, South Africa detained thirty-seven SWAPO politicians, namely Andimba Toivo ya Toivo, Johnny Otto, Nathaniel Maxuilili, and Jason Mutumbulua. Together with the captured SWALA guerrillas, they were jailed in Pretoria and held there until July 1967. All were charged retroactively under the Terrorism Act. The state prosecuted the accused as Marxist revolutionaries seeking to establish a Soviet-backed regime in South West Africa. In what became known as the "1967 Terrorist Trial", six of the accused were found guilty of committing violence in the act of insurrection, with the remainder convicted for armed intimidation, or having received military training for the purpose of insurrection. During the trial, the defendants unsuccessfully argued against allegations that they were privy to an external communist plot. All but three received sentences ranging from five years to life imprisonment on Robben Island.

=== Expansion of the war effort and mine warfare ===
The defeat at Omugulugwombashe and subsequent loss of Tobias Hainyeko forced SWALA to reevaluate its tactics. Guerrillas began operating in larger groups to increase their chances of surviving encounters with the security forces, and refocused their efforts on infiltrating the civilian population. Disguised as peasants, SWALA cadres could acquaint themselves with the terrain and observe South African patrols without arousing suspicion. This was also a logistical advantage because they could only take what supplies they could carry while in the field; otherwise, the guerrillas remained dependent on sympathetic civilians for food, water, and other necessities. On 29 July 1967, the SADF received intelligence that a large number of SWALA forces were congregated at Sacatxai, a settlement almost a hundred and thirty kilometres north of the border inside Angola. South African T-6 Harvard warplanes bombed Sacatxai on 1 August. Most of their intended targets were able to escape, and in October 1968 two SWALA units crossed the border into Ovamboland. This incursion was no more productive than the others and by the end of the year 178 insurgents had been either killed or apprehended by the police.

Throughout the 1950s and much of the 1960s, a limited military service system by lottery was implemented in South Africa to comply with the needs of national defence. Around mid 1967 the National Party government established universal conscription for all white South African men as the SADF expanded to meet the growing insurgent threat. From January 1968 onward there would be two yearly intakes of national servicemen undergoing nine months of military training. The air strike on Sacatxai also marked a fundamental shift in South African tactics, as the SADF had for the first time indicated a willingness to strike at SWALA on foreign soil. Although Angola was then an overseas province of Portugal, Lisbon granted the SADF's request to mount punitive campaigns across the border. In May 1967 South Africa established a new facility at Rundu to coordinate joint air operations between the SADF and the Portuguese Armed Forces, and posted two permanent liaison officers at Menongue and Cuito Cuanavale.

As the war intensified, South Africa's case for annexation in the international community continued to decline, coinciding with an unparalleled wave of sympathy for SWAPO. Despite the ICJ's advisory opinions to the contrary, as well as the dismissal of the case presented by Ethiopia and Liberia, the UN declared that South Africa had failed in its obligations to ensure the moral and material well-being of the indigenous inhabitants of South West Africa, and had thus disavowed its own mandate. The UN thereby assumed that the mandate was terminated, which meant South Africa had no further right to administer the territory, and that henceforth South West Africa would come under the direct responsibility of the General Assembly. The post of United Nations Commissioner for South West Africa was created, as well as an ad hoc council, to recommend practical means for local administration. South Africa maintained it did not recognise the jurisdiction of the UN with regards to the mandate and refused visas to the commissioner or the council. On 12 June 1968, the UN General Assembly adopted a resolution which proclaimed that, in accordance with the desires of its people, South West Africa be renamed Namibia. United Nations Security Council Resolution 269, adopted in August 1969, declared South Africa's continued occupation of Namibia illegal. In recognition of the UN's decision, SWALA was renamed the People's Liberation Army of Namibia.

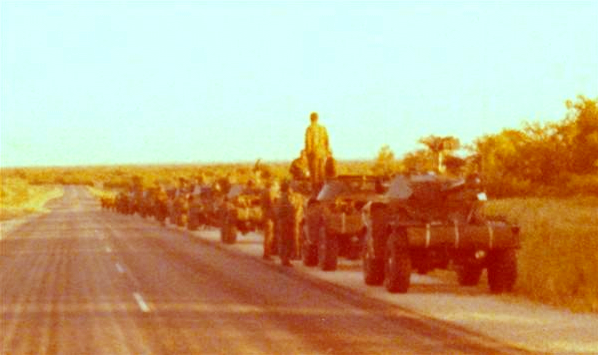
South African armoured column in Ohangwena, 1970s. Convoys of vehicles like these were the primary target for PLAN ambushes and mines.

To regain the military initiative, the adoption of mine warfare as an integral strategy of PLAN was discussed at a 1969–70 SWAPO consultative congress held in Tanzania. PLAN's leadership backed the initiative to deploy land mines as a means of compensating for its inferiority in most conventional aspects to the South African security forces. Shortly afterwards, PLAN began acquiring TM-46 mines from the Soviet Union, which were designed for anti-tank purposes, and produced some homemade "box mines" with TNT for anti-personnel use. The mines were strategically placed along roads to hamper police convoys or throw them into disarray prior to an ambush; guerrillas also laid others along their infiltration routes on the long border with Angola. The proliferation of mines in South West Africa initially resulted in heavy police casualties and would become one of the most defining features of PLAN's war effort for the next two decades.

On 2 May 1971 a police van struck a mine, most likely a TM-46, in the Caprivi Strip. The resulting explosion blew a crater in the road about two metres in diameter and sent the vehicle airborne, killing two senior police officers and injuring nine others. This was the first mine-related incident recorded on South West African soil. In October 1971, another police vehicle detonated a mine outside Katima Mulilo, wounding four constables. The following day, a fifth constable was mortally injured when he stepped on a second mine laid directly alongside the first. This reflected a new PLAN tactic of laying anti-personnel mines parallel to their anti-tank mines to kill policemen or soldiers either engaging in preliminary mine detection or inspecting the scene of a previous blast. In 1972, South Africa acknowledged that two more policemen had died and another three had been injured as a result of mines.

The proliferation of mines in the Caprivi and other rural areas posed a serious concern to the South African government, as they were relatively easy for a PLAN cadre to conceal and plant with minimal chance of detection. Sweeping the roads for mines with hand held mine detectors was possible, but too slow and tedious to be a practical means of ensuring swift police movement or keeping routes open for civilian use. The SADF possessed some mine clearance equipment, including flails and ploughs mounted on tanks, but these were not considered practical either. The sheer distances of road vulnerable to PLAN sappers every day was simply too vast for daily detection and clearance efforts. For the SADF and the police, the only other viable option was the adoption of armoured personnel carriers with mine-proof hulls that could move quickly on roads with little risk to their passengers even if a mine was encountered. This would evolve into a new class of military vehicle, the mine resistant and ambush protected vehicle (MRAP). By the end of 1972, the South African police were carrying out most of their patrols in the Caprivi Strip with mineproofed vehicles.

=== Political unrest in Ovamboland ===
United Nations Security Council Resolution 283 was passed in June 1970 calling for all UN member states to close, or refrain from establishing, diplomatic or consular offices in South West Africa. The resolution also recommended disinvestment, boycotts, and voluntary sanctions of that territory as long as it remained under South African rule. In light of these developments, the Security Council sought the advisory opinion of the ICJ on the "legal consequences for states of the continued presence of South Africa in Namibia". There was initial opposition to this course of action from SWAPO and the OAU, because their delegates feared another inconclusive ruling like the one in 1966 would strengthen South Africa's case for annexation. Nevertheless, the prevailing opinion at the Security Council was that since the composition of judges had been changed since 1966, a ruling in favour of the nationalist movement was more likely. At the UN's request, SWAPO was permitted to lobby informally at the court and was even offered an observer presence in the courtroom itself.

On 21 June 1971, the ICJ reversed its earlier decision not to rule on the legality of South Africa's mandate, and expressed the opinion that any continued perpetuation of said mandate was illegal. Furthermore, the court found that Pretoria was under obligation to withdraw its administration immediately and that if it failed to do so, UN member states would be compelled to refrain from any political or business dealings which might imply recognition of the South African government's presence there. On the same day the ICJ's ruling was made public, South African prime minister B. J. Vorster rejected it as "politically motivated", with no foundation in fact. However, the decision inspired the bishops of the Evangelical Lutheran Ovambo-Kavango Church to draw up an open letter to Vorster denouncing apartheid and South Africa's continued rule. This letter was read in every black Lutheran congregation in the territory, and in a number of Catholic and Anglican parishes elsewhere. The consequence of the letter's contents was increased militancy on the part of the black population, especially among the Ovambo people, who made up the bulk of SWAPO's supporters. Throughout the year there were mass demonstrations against the South African government held in many Ovamboland schools.

In December 1971, Jannie de Wet, Commissioner for the Indigenous Peoples of South West Africa, sparked off a general strike by 15,000 Ovambo workers in Walvis Bay when he made a public statement defending the territory's controversial contract labour regulations. The strike quickly spread to municipal workers in Windhoek, and from there to the diamond, copper and tin mines, especially those at Tsumeb, Grootfontein, and Oranjemund. Later in the month, 25,000 Ovambo farm labourers joined what had become a nationwide strike affecting half the total workforce. The South African police responded by arresting some of the striking workers and forcibly deporting the others to Ovamboland. On 10 January 1972, an ad hoc strike committee led by Johannes Nangutuuala, was formed to negotiate with the South African government; the strikers demanded an end to contract labour, freedom to apply for jobs according to skill and interest and to quit a job if so desired, freedom to have a worker bring his family with him from Ovamboland while taking a job elsewhere, and for equal pay with white workers.

The strike was later brought to an end after the South African government agreed to several concessions which were endorsed by Nangutuuala, including the implementation of uniform working hours and allowing workers to change jobs. Responsibility for labour recruitment was also transferred to the tribal authorities in Ovamboland. Thousands of the sacked Ovambo workers remained dissatisfied with these terms and refused to return to work. They attacked tribal headmen, vandalised stock control posts and government offices, and tore down about a hundred kilometres of fencing along the border, which they claimed obstructed itinerant Ovambos from grazing their cattle freely. The unrest also fueled discontent among Kwanyama-speaking Ovambos in Angola, who destroyed cattle vaccination stations and schools and attacked four border posts, killing and injuring some SADF personnel as well as members of a Portuguese militia unit. South Africa responded by declaring a state of emergency in Ovamboland on 4 February. A media blackout was imposed, white civilians evacuated further south, public assembly rights revoked, and the security forces empowered to detain suspicious persons indefinitely. Police reinforcements were sent to the border, and in the ensuing crackdown they arrested 213 Ovambos. South Africa was sufficiently alarmed at the violence to deploy a large SADF contingent as well. They were joined by Portuguese troops who moved south from across the border to assist them. By the end of March order had been largely restored and most of the remaining strikers returned to work.

Flag of Ovamboland, which was granted self-governing status as an autonomous bantustan in 1973.

South Africa blamed SWAPO for instigating the strike and subsequent unrest. While acknowledging that a significant percentage of the strikers were SWAPO members and supporters, the party's acting president Nathaniel Maxuilili noted that reform of South West African labour laws had been a longstanding aspiration of the Ovambo workforce, and suggested the strike had been organised shortly after the crucial ICJ ruling because they hoped to take advantage of its publicity to draw greater attention to their grievances. The strike also had a politicising effect on much of the Ovambo population, as the workers involved later turned to wider political activity and joined SWAPO. Around 20,000 strikers did not return to work but fled to other countries, mostly Zambia, where some were recruited as guerrillas by PLAN. Support for PLAN also increased among the rural Ovamboland peasantry, who were for the most part sympathetic with the strikers and resentful of their traditional chiefs' active collaboration with the police.

The following year, South Africa transferred self-governing authority to Chief Fillemon Elifas Shuumbwa and the Ovambo legislature, effectively granting Ovamboland a limited form of home rule. Voter turnout at the legislative elections was exceedingly poor, due in part to antipathy towards the local Ovamboland government and a SWAPO boycott of the polls.

=== Police withdrawal ===
Swelled by thousands of new recruits and an increasingly sophisticated arsenal of heavy weapons, PLAN undertook more direct confrontations with the security forces in 1973. Insurgent activity took the form of ambushes and selective target attacks, particularly in the Caprivi near the Zambian border. On the evening of 26 January 1973 a heavily armed group of about 50 PLAN insurgents attacked a police base at Singalamwe, Caprivi with mortars, machine guns, and a single tube, man portable rocket launcher. The police were ill-equipped to repel the attack and the base soon caught fire due to the initial rocket bombardment, which incapacitated both the senior officer and his second in command. This marked the beginning of a new phase of the South African Border War in which the scope and intensity of PLAN raids were greatly increased. By the end of 1973, PLAN's insurgency had engulfed six regions: Caprivi, Ovamboland, Kaokoland, and Kavangoland. It also had successfully recruited another 2,400 Ovambo and 600 Lozi guerrillas. PLAN reports from late 1973 indicate that the militants planned to open up two new fronts in central South West Africa and carry out acts of urban insurrection in Windhoek, Walvis Bay, and other major urban centres.

Until 1973, the South African Border War was perceived as a matter of law enforcement rather than a military conflict, reflecting a trend among Anglophone Commonwealth states to regard police as the principal force in the suppression of insurgencies. The South African police did have paramilitary capabilities, and had previously seen action during the Rhodesian Bush War. However, the failure of the police to prevent the escalation of the war in South West Africa led to the SADF assuming responsibility for all counter-insurgency campaigns on 1 April 1974. The last regular South African police units were withdrawn from South West Africa's borders three months later, in June. At this time there were about 15,000 SADF personnel being deployed to take their place. The SADF's budget was increased by nearly 150% between 1973 and 1974 accordingly. In August 1974, the SADF cleared a buffer strip about five kilometres wide which ran parallel to the Angolan border and was intensely patrolled and monitored for signs of PLAN infiltration. This would become known as "the Cutline".

== Angolan front (1975–1977) ==
On 25 April 1974, the Carnation Revolution ousted Marcelo Caetano and Portugal's right-wing Estado Novo government, sounding the death knell for the Portuguese Empire. The Carnation Revolution was followed by a period of instability in Angola, which threatened to erupt into civil war, and South Africa was forced to consider the unpalatable likelihood that a Soviet-backed regime there allied with SWAPO would in turn create increased military pressure on South West Africa. PLAN incursions from Angola were already beginning to spike due to the cessation of patrols and active operations there by the Portuguese.

In the last months of 1974, Portugal announced its intention to grant Angola independence and embarked on a series of hasty efforts to negotiate a power-sharing accord, the Alvor Agreement, between rival Angolan nationalists. There were three disparate nationalist movements then active in Angola, the People's Movement for the Liberation of Angola (MPLA), the National Union for the Total Independence of Angola (UNITA), and the National Liberation Front of Angola (FNLA). The three movements had all participated in the Angolan War of Independence and shared a common goal of liberating the country from colonial rule, but also claimed unique ethnic support bases, different ideological inclinations, and their own conflicting ties to foreign parties and governments. Although each possessed vaguely socialist leanings, the MPLA was the only party which enjoyed close ties to the Soviet Union and was openly committed to Marxist policies. Its adherence to the concept of an exclusive one-party state alienated it from the FNLA and UNITA, which began portraying themselves as anti-communist and pro-Western in orientation.

South Africa believed that if the MPLA succeeded in seizing power, it would support the PLAN militarily and lead to an unprecedented escalation of the fighting in South West Africa. While the collapse of the Portuguese colonial state was inevitable, Pretoria hoped to install a moderate anti-communist government in its place, which in turn would continue cooperating with the SADF and work to deny PLAN bases on Angolan soil. This led Prime Minister Vorster and South African intelligence chief Hendrik van den Bergh to embark on a major covert action programme in Angola, Operation Savannah. Arms and money were secretly funnelled to the FNLA and UNITA, in exchange for their promised support against PLAN. Jonas Savimbi, UNITA's president, claimed he knew where PLAN's camps in southern Angola were located and was prepared to "attack, detain, or expel" PLAN fighters. FNLA President Holden Roberto made similar assurances and promised that he would grant the SADF freedom of movement in Angola to pursue PLAN.

=== Operation Savannah ===
Within days of the Alvor Agreement, the Central Intelligence Agency launched its own programme, Operation IA Feature, to arm the FNLA, with the stated objective of "prevent[ing] an easy victory by Soviet-backed forces in Angola". The United States was searching for regional allies to take part in Operation IA Feature and perceived South Africa as the "ideal solution" in defeating the pro-Soviet MPLA. With tacit American encouragement, the FNLA and UNITA began massing large numbers of troops in northern and southern Angola, respectively, in an attempt to gain tactical superiority. The transitional government installed by the Alvor Agreement disintegrated and the MPLA requested support from its communist allies. Between February and April 1975, the MPLA's armed wing, the People's Armed Forces of Liberation of Angola (FAPLA), received shipments of Soviet arms, mostly channelled through Cuba or the People's Republic of the Congo. At the end of May, FAPLA personnel were being instructed in their use by a contingent of about 200 Cuban military advisers. Over the next two months, they proceeded to inflict a series of crippling defeats on the FNLA and UNITA, which were driven out of the Angolan capital, Luanda.

Weapons pour into the country in the form of Russian help to the MPLA. Tanks, armoured troop carriers, rockets, mortars, and smaller arms have already been delivered. The situation remains exceptionally fluid and chaotic, and provides cover for SWAPO [insurgents] out of South West Africa. Russian help and support, both material and in moral encouragement, constitutes a direct threat.

— P.W. Botha addresses the South African parliament on the topic of Angola, September 1975

To South African Minister of Defence P.W. Botha, it was evident that the MPLA had gained the upper hand; in a memo dated late June 1975, he observed that the MPLA could "for all intents and purposes be considered the presumptive ultimate rulers of Angola...only drastic and unforeseeable developments could alter such an outcome." Skirmishes at the Calueque hydroelectric dam, which supplied electricity to South West Africa, gave Botha the opportunity to escalate the SADF's involvement in Angola. On 9 August, a thousand South African troops crossed into Angola and occupied Calueque. While their public objective was to protect the hydroelectric installation and the lives of the civilian engineers employed there, the SADF was also intent on searching out PLAN cadres and weakening FAPLA.

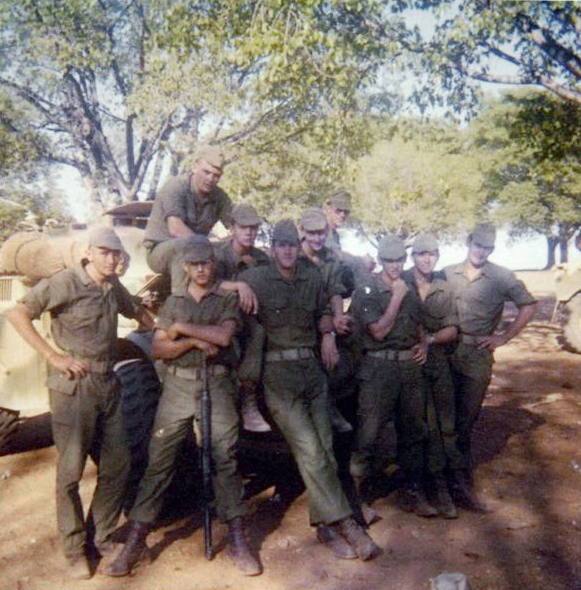
South African troops in nondescript uniforms during Operation Savannah.

A watershed in the Angolan conflict was the South African decision on 25 October to commit 2,500 of its own troops to battle. Larger quantities of more sophisticated arms had been delivered to FAPLA by this point, such as T-34-85 tanks, wheeled armoured personnel carriers, towed rocket launchers and field guns. While most of this hardware was antiquated, it proved extremely effective, given the fact that most of FAPLA's opponents consisted of disorganised, under-equipped militias. In early October, FAPLA launched a major combined arms offensive on UNITA's national headquarters at Nova Lisboa, which was only repelled with considerable difficulty and assistance from a small team of SADF advisers. It became evident to the SADF that neither UNITA or the FNLA possessed armies capable of taking and holding territory, as their fighting strength depended on militias which excelled only in guerrilla warfare. South Africa would need its own combat troops to not only defend its allies, but carry out a decisive counter-offensive against FAPLA. This proposal was approved by the South African government on the condition that only a small, covert task force would be permitted. SADF personnel participating in offensive operations were told to pose as mercenaries. They were stripped of any identifiable equipment, including their dog tags, and re-issued with nondescript uniforms and weapons impossible to trace.

On 22 October, the SADF airlifted more personnel and a squadron of Eland armoured cars to bolster UNITA positions at Silva Porto. Within days, they had overrun considerable territory and captured several strategic settlements. The SADF's advance was so rapid that it often succeeded in driving FAPLA out of two or three towns in a single day. Eventually the South African expeditionary force split into three separate columns of motorised infantry and armoured cars to cover more ground. Pretoria intended for the SADF to help the FNLA and UNITA win the civil war before Angola's formal independence date, which the Portuguese had set for 11 November, then withdraw quietly. By early November, the three SADF columns had captured eighteen major towns and cities, including several provincial capitals, and penetrated over five hundred kilometres into Angola. Upon receiving intelligence reports that the SADF had openly intervened on the side of the FNLA and UNITA, the Soviet Union began preparations for a massive airlift of arms to FAPLA.

==== Cuba responds with Operation Carlota ====
On 3 November, a South African unit advancing towards Benguela, Angola paused to attack a FAPLA base which housed a substantial training contingent of Cuban advisers. When reports reached Cuban President Fidel Castro that the advisers had been engaged by what appeared to be SADF regulars, he decided to approve a request from the MPLA leadership for direct military assistance. Castro declared that he would send all "the men and weapons necessary to win that struggle", in the spirit of proletarian internationalism and solidarity with the MPLA. Castro named this mission Operation Carlota after an African woman who had organised a slave revolt on Cuba.

The first Cuban combat troops began departing for Angola on 7 November, and were drawn from a special paramilitary battalion of the Cuban Ministry of Interior. These were followed closely by one mechanised and one artillery battalion of the Cuban Revolutionary Armed Forces, which set off by ship and would not reach Luanda until 27 November. They were kept supplied by a massive airlift carried out with Soviet aircraft. The Soviet Union also deployed a small naval contingent and about 400 military advisers to Luanda. Heavy weapons were flown and transported by sea directly from various Warsaw Pact member states to Angola for the arriving Cubans, including tanks, helicopters, armoured cars, and even 10 Mikoyan-Gurevich MiG-21 fighter aircraft, which were assembled by Cuban and Soviet technicians in Luanda. By the end of the year, there were 12,000 Cuban soldiers inside Angola, nearly the size of the entire SADF presence in South West Africa. The FNLA suffered a crushing defeat at the Battle of Quifangondo when it attempted to take Luanda on 10 November, and the capital remained in FAPLA hands by independence.

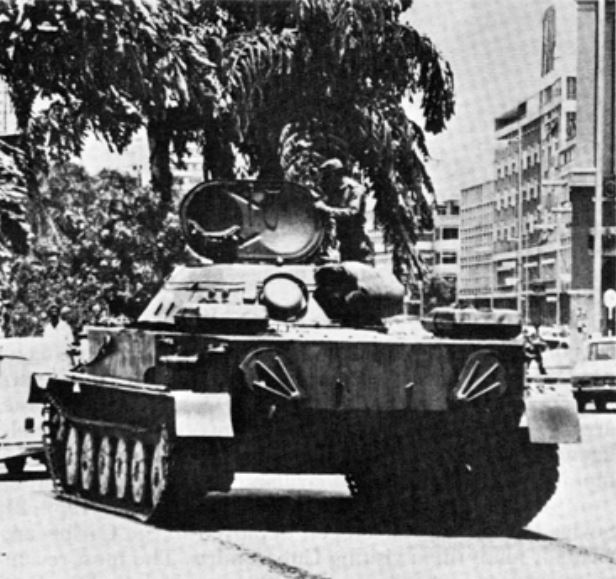
Cuban-manned PT-76 tank in the streets of Luanda, 1976.

Throughout late November and early December, the Cubans focused on fighting the FNLA in the north, and stopping an abortive incursion by Zaire on behalf of that movement. Thereafter, they refocused on putting an end to the SADF advances in the south. The South African and Cuban forces engaged in a series of bloody, but inconclusive skirmishes and battles throughout late December. However, by this point word of the SADF's involvement had been leaked to the international press, and photographs of SADF armour behind UNITA lines were appearing in several European newspapers. This proved to be a major political setback for the South African government, which was almost universally condemned for its interference in a black African country. Moreover, it spurred influential African states such as Nigeria and Tanzania to recognise the MPLA as the sole legitimate government of Angola, as that movement's struggle against an apparent act of South African aggression gave it legitimacy at the OAU.

South Africa appealed to the United States for more direct support, but when the CIA's role in arming the FNLA also became public, the US Congress terminated and disavowed the programme. In the face of regional and international condemnation, the SADF made the decision around Christmas of 1975 to begin withdrawing from Angola. The withdrawal commenced in February 1976 and formally ended a month later. As the FNLA and UNITA lost their logistical backing from the CIA and the direct military support of the SADF, they were forced to abandon much of their territory to a renewed FAPLA offensive. The FNLA was almost completely wiped out, but UNITA succeeded in retreating deep into the country's wooded highlands, where it continued to mount a determined insurgency. Operation Savannah was widely regarded as a strategic failure. South Africa and the US had committed resources and manpower to the initial objective of preventing a FAPLA victory prior to Angolan independence, which was achieved. But the early successes of Savannah provided the MPLA politburo with a reason to increase the deployment of Cuban troops and Soviet advisers exponentially.

The CIA correctly predicted that Cuba and the Soviet Union would continue to support FAPLA at whatever level was necessary to prevail, while South Africa was inclined to withdraw its forces rather than risk incurring heavy casualties. The SADF had suffered between 28 and 35 killed in action. An additional 100 were wounded. Seven South Africans were captured and displayed at Angolan press briefings as living proof of the SADF's involvement. Cuban casualties were known to be much higher; several hundred were killed in engagements with the SADF or UNITA. Twenty Cubans were taken prisoner: 17 by UNITA, and 3 by the South Africans. South Africa's National Party suffered some domestic fallout as a result of Savannah, as Prime Minister Vorster had concealed the operation from the public for fear of alarming the families of national servicemen deployed on Angolan soil. The South African public was shocked to learn of the details, and attempts by the government to cover up the debacle were slated in the local press.

=== Shipanga Affair and PLAN's exit to Angola ===
In the aftermath of the MPLA's political and military victory, it was recognised as the official government of the new People's Republic of Angola by the European Economic Community and the UN General Assembly. Around May 1976 the MPLA concluded several new agreements with Moscow for broad Soviet-Angolan cooperation in the diplomatic, economic, and military spheres; simultaneously both countries also issued a joint expression of solidarity with the Namibian struggle for independence.

Cuba, the Soviet Union, and other Warsaw Pact member states specifically justified their involvement with the Angolan Civil War as a form of proletarian internationalism. This theory placed an emphasis on socialist solidarity between all left-wing revolutionary struggles, and suggested that one purpose of a successful revolution was to likewise ensure the success of another elsewhere. Cuba in particular had thoroughly embraced the concept of internationalism, and one of its foreign policy objectives in Angola was to further the process of national liberation in southern Africa by overthrowing colonial or white minority regimes. Cuban policies with regards to Angola and the conflict in South West Africa thus became inexorably linked. As Cuban military personnel had begun to make their appearance in Angola in increasing numbers, they also arrived in Zambia to help train PLAN. South Africa's defence establishment perceived this aspect of Cuban and to a lesser extent Soviet policy through the prism of the domino theory: if Havana and Moscow succeeded in installing a communist regime in Angola, it was only a matter of time before they attempted the same in South West Africa.

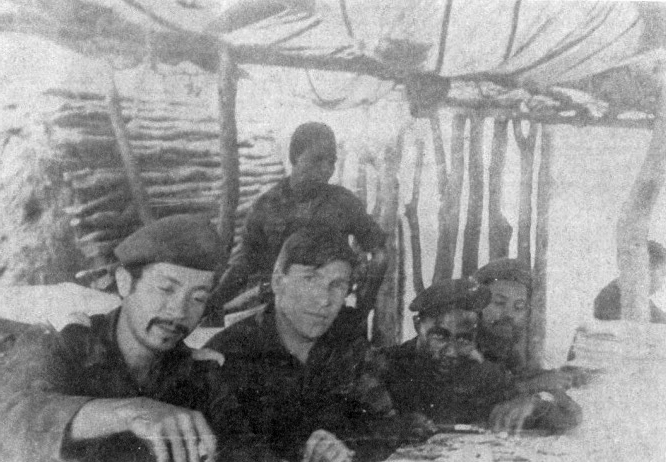
Soviet training instructors with PLAN recruits, late 1970s.

Operation Savannah accelerated the shift of SWAPO's alliances among the Angolan nationalist movements. Until August 1975, SWAPO was theoretically aligned with the MPLA, but in reality PLAN had enjoyed a close working relationship with UNITA during the Angolan War of Independence. In September 1975, SWAPO issued a public statement declaring its intention to remain neutral in the Angolan Civil War and refrain from supporting any single political faction or party. With the South African withdrawal in March, Sam Nujoma retracted his movement's earlier position and endorsed the MPLA as the "authentic representative of the Angolan people". During the same month, Cuba began flying in small numbers of PLAN recruits from Zambia to Angola to commence guerrilla training. PLAN shared intelligence with the Cubans and FAPLA, and from April 1976 even fought alongside them against UNITA. FAPLA often used PLAN cadres to garrison strategic sites while freeing up more of its own personnel for deployments elsewhere.

The emerging MPLA-SWAPO alliance took on special significance after PLAN was wracked by a mutiny in Western Province, Zambia between March and April 1976, known as the Shipanga Affair. Relations between SWAPO and the Zambian government were already troubled due to the fact that the growing intensity of PLAN attacks on the Caprivi often provoked retaliatory SADF raids into Zambia. When SWAPO's executive committee proved unable to suppress the PLAN revolt, the Zambian National Defence Force (ZNDF) mobilised several army battalions and attacked the camps held by the mutineers, rounding up an estimated 1,800 PLAN dissidents. SWAPO's Secretary for Information, Andreas Shipanga, was found responsible by the Zambian government for inciting the revolt. Zambian president Kenneth Kaunda deported Shipanga and several other high-ranking dissidents to Tanzania, while incarcerating the others at remote army facilities. Sam Nujoma accused them of being South African agents and carried out a purge of the surviving political leadership and PLAN ranks. Forty mutineers were formally sentenced to death by a PLAN tribunal in Lusaka, and hundreds of others were subject to enforced disappearances. Additionally, the heightened tension between Kaunda's government and PLAN resulted in the ZNDF confiscating PLAN arms caches.

The fallout from the Shipanga Affair prompted PLAN to relocate its headquarters from Lusaka to Lubango, Angola, at the invitation of the MPLA. It was joined shortly afterwards by SWAPO's political wing, which relocated to Luanda. SWAPO's closer affiliation and proximity to the MPLA may have influenced its concurrent slide to the left; the party adopted a more overtly Marxist discourse, such as a commitment to a classless society based on the ideals and principles of scientific socialism. From 1976 onward, SWAPO considered itself the ideological as well as the military ally of the MPLA.

In 1977, Cuba and the Soviet Union established dozens of new training camps in Angola to accommodate PLAN and two other guerrilla movements in the region, the Zimbabwe People's Revolutionary Army (ZIPRA) and Umkhonto we Sizwe (MK). The Cubans provided instructors and specialist officers, while the Soviets provided more hardware for the guerrillas. This convergence of interests between the Cuban and Soviet military missions in Angola proved successful as it drew on each partner's comparative strengths. The Soviet Union's strength lay in its vast military industry, which furnished the raw material for bolstering FAPLA and its allies. Cuba's strength lay in its manpower and troop commitment to Angola, which included technical advisers who were familiar with the sophisticated weaponry supplied by the Soviets and possessed combat experience. In order to reduce the likelihood of a South African attack, the training camps were sited near Cuban or FAPLA military installations, with the added advantage of being able to rely on the logistical and communications infrastructure of PLAN's allies.

== External South African operations (1978–1984) ==
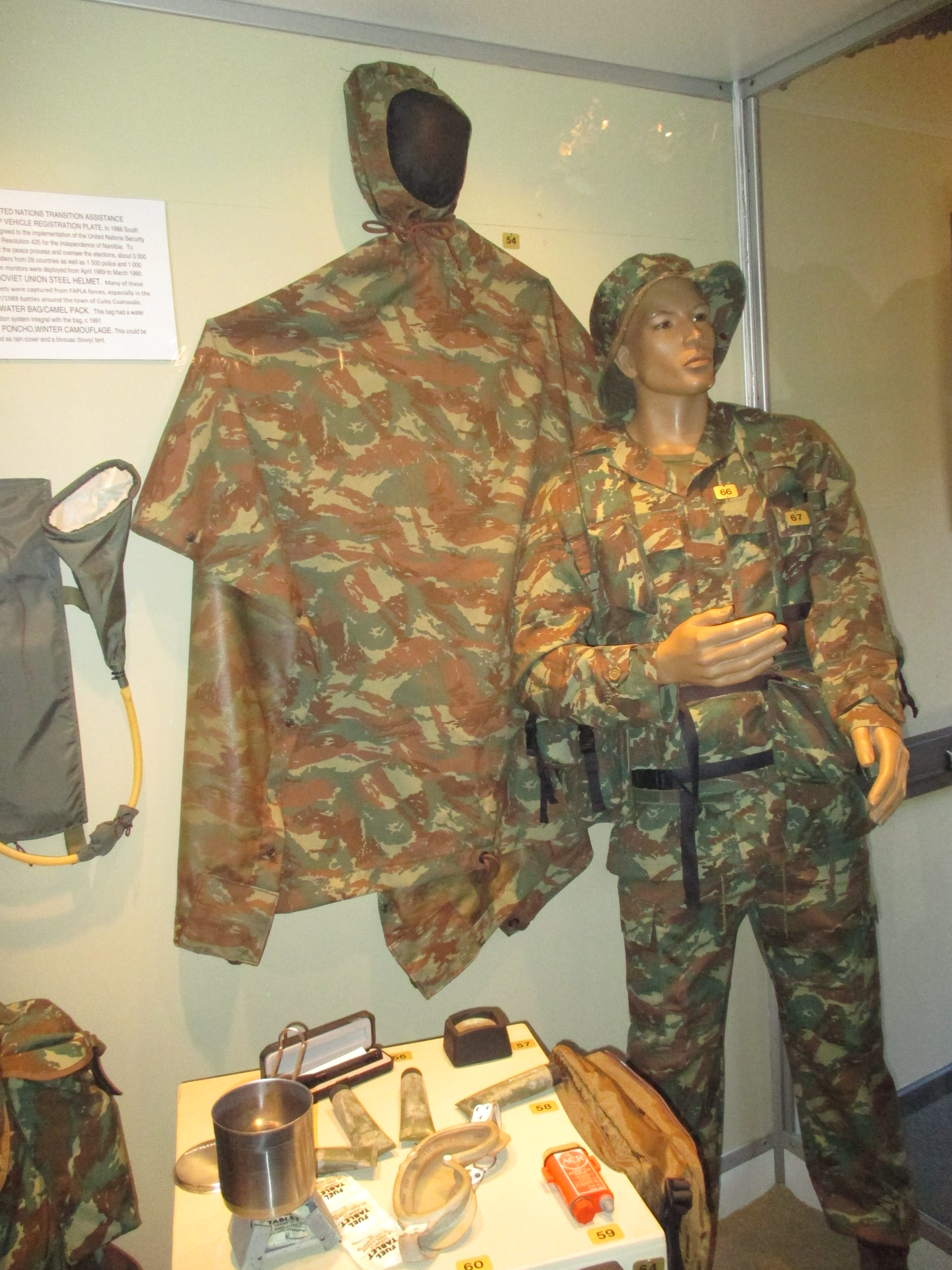
32 Battalion uniform patterned after those issued to FAPLA. Members of this unit often wore ubiquitous uniforms to avoid scrutiny while operating in Angola

Access to Angola provided PLAN with limitless opportunities to train its forces in secure sanctuaries and infiltrate insurgents and supplies across South West Africa's northern border. The guerrillas gained a great deal of leeway to manage their logistical operations through Angola's Moçâmedes District, using the ports, roads, and railways from the sea to supply their forward operating bases. Soviet vessels offloaded arms at the port of Moçâmedes, which were then transshipped by rail to Lubango and from there through a chain of PLAN supply routes snaking their way south towards the border. "Our geographic isolation was over," Nujoma commented in his memoirs. "It was as if a locked door had suddenly swung open...we could at last make direct attacks across our northern frontier and send in our forces and weapons on a large scale."

In the territories of Ovamboland, Kaokoland, Kavangoland and East Caprivi after 1976, the SADF installed fixed defences against infiltration, employing two parallel electrified fences and motion sensors. The system was backed by roving patrols drawn from Eland armoured car squadrons, motorised infantry, canine units, horsemen and scrambler motorcycles for mobility and speed over rough terrain; local San trackers, Ovambo paramilitaries, and South African special forces. PLAN attempted hit-and-run raids across the border but, in what was characterised as the "corporal's war", SADF sections largely intercepted them in the Cutline before they could get any further into South West Africa itself. The brunt of the fighting was shouldered by small, mobile rapid reaction forces, whose role was to track and eliminate the insurgents after a PLAN presence was detected. These reaction forces were attached on the battalion level and maintained at maximum readiness on individual bases.

The SADF carried out mostly reconnaissance operations inside Angola, although its forces in South West Africa could fire and manoeuvre across the border in self-defence if attacked from the Angolan side. Once they reached the Cutline, a reaction force sought permission either to enter Angola or abort the pursuit. South Africa also set up a specialist unit, 32 Battalion, which concerned itself with reconnoitring infiltration routes from Angola. 32 Battalion regularly sent teams recruited from ex-FNLA militants and led by white South African personnel into an authorised zone up to fifty kilometres deep in Angola; it could also dispatch platoon-sized reaction forces of similar composition to attack vulnerable PLAN targets. As their operations had to be clandestine and covert, with no link to South African forces, 32 Battalion teams wore FAPLA or PLAN uniforms and carried Soviet weapons. Climate shaped the activities of both sides. Seasonal variations during the summer passage of the Intertropical Convergence Zone resulted in an annual period of heavy rains over northern South West Africa between February and April. The rainy season made military operations difficult. Thickening foliage provided the insurgents with concealment from South African patrols, and their tracks were obliterated by the rain. At the end of April or early May, PLAN cadres returned to Angola to escape renewed SADF search and destroy efforts and retrain for the following year.

Another significant factor of the physical environment was South West Africa's limited road network. The main arteries for SADF bases on the border were two highways leading west to Ruacana and north to Oshikango, and a third which stretched from Grootfontein through Kavangoland to Rundu. Much of this vital road infrastructure was vulnerable to guerrilla sabotage: innumerable road culverts and bridges were blown up and rebuilt multiple times over the course of the war. After their destruction PLAN saboteurs sowed the surrounding area with land mines to catch the South African engineers sent to repair them. One of the most routine tasks for local sector troops was a morning patrol along their assigned stretch of highway to check for mines or overnight sabotage. Despite their efforts, it was nearly impossible to guard or patrol the almost limitless number of vulnerable points on the road network, and losses from mines mounted steadily; for instance, in 1977 the SADF suffered 16 deaths due to mined roads. Aside from road sabotage, the SADF was also forced to contend with regular ambushes of both military and civilian traffic throughout Ovamboland. Movement between towns was by escorted convoy, and the roads in the north were closed to civilian traffic between six in the evening and half past seven in the morning. White civilians and administrators from Oshakati, Ondangwa, and Rundu began routinely carrying arms, and never ventured far from their fortified neighbourhoods.

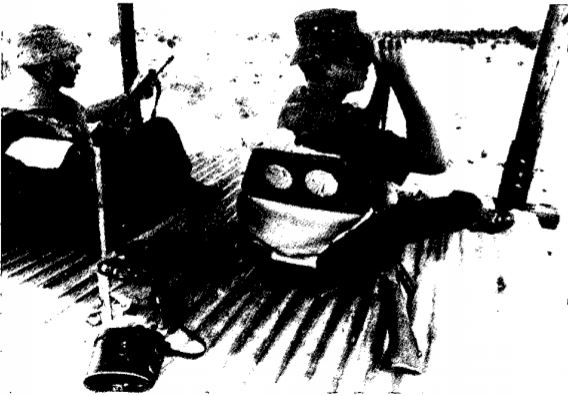
SADF sentries on border duty, monitoring the "Cutline" for guerrilla cadres.

Unharried by major South African offensives, PLAN was free to consolidate its military organisation in Angola. PLAN's leadership under Dimo Hamaambo concentrated on improving its communications and control throughout that country, demarcating the Angolan front into three military zones, in which guerrilla activities were coordinated by a single operational headquarters. The Western Command was headquartered in western Huíla Province and responsible for PLAN operations in Kaokoland and western Ovamboland. The Central Command was headquartered in central Huíla Province and responsible for PLAN operations in central Ovamboland. The Eastern Command was headquartered in northern Huíla Province and responsible for PLAN operations in eastern Ovamboland and Kavangoland.

The three PLAN regional headquarters each developed their own forces which resembled standing armies with regard to the division of military labour, incorporating various specialties such as counter-intelligence, air defence, reconnaissance, combat engineering, sabotage, and artillery. The Eastern Command also created an elite force in 1978, known as "Volcano" and subsequently, "Typhoon", which was trained by the East German military mission in Angola and carried out unconventional operations south of Ovamboland.

South Africa's defence chiefs requested an end to restrictions on air and ground operations north of the Cutline. Citing the accelerated pace of PLAN infiltration, P.W. Botha recommended that the SADF be permitted, as it had been prior to March 1976, to send large numbers of troops into southern Angola. Vorster, unwilling to risk incurring the same international and domestic political fallout associated with Operation Savannah, repeatedly rejected Botha's proposals. Nevertheless, the Ministry of Defence and the SADF continued advocating air and ground attacks on PLAN's Angolan sanctuaries.

=== Operation Reindeer ===
On 27 October 1977, a group of insurgents attacked a SADF patrol in the Cutline, killing 5 South African soldiers and mortally wounding a sixth. As military historian Willem Steenkamp records, "while not a large clash by World War II or Vietnam standards, it was a milestone in what was then...a low intensity conflict". Three months later, insurgents fired on patrols in the Cutline again, killing six more soldiers. The growing number of ambushes and infiltrations were timed to coincide with assassination attempts on prominent South West African tribal officials. Perhaps the most high-profile assassination of a tribal leader during this time was that of Herero chief Clemens Kapuuo, which South Africa blamed on PLAN. Vorster finally acquiesced to Botha's requests for retaliatory strikes against PLAN in Angola, and the SADF launched Operation Reindeer in May 1978.

One controversial development of Operation Reindeer helped sour the international community on the South African Border War. On 4 May 1978, a battalion-sized task force of the 44 Parachute Brigade conducted a sweep through the Angolan mining town of Cassinga, searching for what it believed was a PLAN administrative centre. Lieutenant General Constand Viljoen, the chief of the South African Army, had told the task force commanders and his immediate superior General Johannes Geldenhuys that Cassinga was a PLAN "planning headquarters" which also functioned as the "principal medical centre for the treatment of seriously injured guerrillas, as well as the concentration point for guerrilla recruits being dispatched to training centres in Lubango and Luanda and to operational bases in east and west Cunene." The task force was made up of older Citizen Force reservists, many of whom had already served tours on the border, led by experienced professional officers.

The task force of about 370 paratroops entered Cassinga, which was known as Objective Moscow to the SADF, in the wake of an intense aerial bombardment. From this point onward, there are two differing accounts of the Cassinga incident. While both concur that an airborne South African unit entered Cassinga on 4 May and that the paratroopers destroyed a large camp complex, they diverge on the characteristics of the site and the casualties inflicted. The SWAPO and Cuban narrative presented Cassinga as a refugee camp, and the South African government's narrative presented Cassinga as a guerrilla base. The first account claimed that Cassinga was housing a large population of civilians who had fled the escalating violence in northern South West Africa and were merely dependent on PLAN for their sustenance and protection. According to this narrative, South African paratroopers opened fire on the refugees, mostly women and children; those not immediately killed were systematically rounded up into groups and bayoneted or shot. The alleged result was the massacre of at least 612 South West African civilians, almost all elderly men, women, and children. The SADF narrative concurred with a death toll of approximately 600 but claimed that most of the dead were insurgents killed defending a series of trenches around the camp. South African sources identified Cassinga as a PLAN installation on the basis of aerial reconnaissance photographs, which depicted a network of trenches as well as a military parade ground. Additionally, photographs of the parade ground taken by a Swedish reporter just prior to the raid depicted children and women in civilian clothing, but also uniformed PLAN guerrillas and large numbers of young men of military age. SWAPO maintained that it ordered the trenches around Cassinga dug to shelter the otherwise defenceless refugees in the event of a SADF raid, and only after camp staff had noted spotter planes overhead several weeks prior. It justified the construction of a parade ground as part of a programme to instill a sense of discipline and unity.

Western journalists and Angolan officials counted 582 corpses on site a few hours after the SADF's departure. The SADF suffered 3 dead and 1 missing in action.

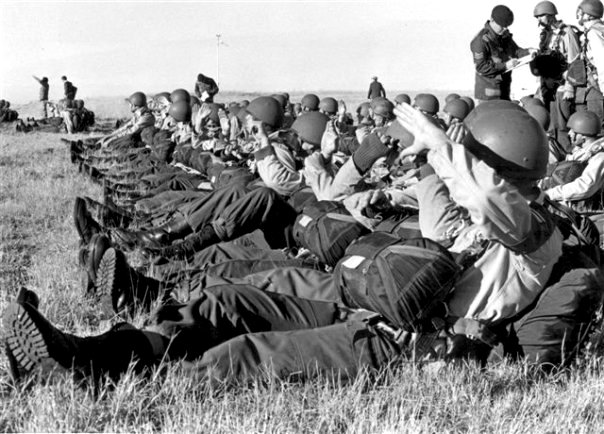
Members of 44 Parachute Brigade in training.

An adjacent Cuban mechanised infantry battalion stationed sixteen kilometres to the south advanced to confront the paratroops during the attack, but suffered several delays due to strafing runs by South African Dassault Mirage III and Blackburn Buccaneer strike aircraft. In the first known engagement between South African and Cuban forces since the termination of Operation Savannah, five Cuban T-34-85 tanks and some infantry in BTR-152 armoured personnel carriers reached Cassinga while the paratroopers were being airlifted out by helicopter. This led to a protracted firefight in which Cuba acknowledged 16 dead and over 80 wounded. The Cassinga event was given special significance by Cuban historians such as Jorge Risquet, who noted that it marked the first time that "Cubans and Namibians shed their blood together fighting the South African [military]."

While Cassinga was in the process of being destroyed, a South African armoured column attacked a network of guerrilla transit camps at Chetequera, code named "Objective Vietnam", which was only about thirty kilometres from the Cutline. Chetequera was much more heavily fortified than Cassinga and the SADF encountered fierce resistance. Unlike the latter, it had been scouted thoroughly by South African reconnaissance assets on the ground, and they were able to verify the absence of civilians with ample photographic and documentary evidence. The SADF suffered another 3 dead at Chetequera, in addition to 30 wounded. PLAN lost 248 dead and 200 taken prisoner.

On 6 May 1978, Operation Reindeer was condemned by United Nations Security Council Resolution 428, which described it as a violation of Angola's territorial integrity and threatened punitive measures should the SADF attempt another incursion on Angolan soil. The resolution attracted almost unanimous support worldwide, and was endorsed not only by the Soviet Union, but by major Western powers such as the US, the UK, France, Canada, and West Germany. As the Cassinga incident received publicity, American and European attitudes became one of intense criticism of South African purpose as well as the process by which it carried out the war. Notably, Western pressure at the UN to recognise South Africa as an equal partner in any future Namibian peace settlement evaporated.

Cassinga was a major political breakthrough for SWAPO, which had portrayed the casualties there as martyrs of a Namibian nation in the making. The movement received unprecedented support in the form of humanitarian aid sent to its remaining refugee camps and offers from foreign governments to educate refugees in their countries.

=== Botha's escalation ===
Vorster's failing health and his preoccupation with domestic issues such as the looming Muldergate Scandal diverted his attention from South West Africa from May to September 1978, and no more major operations were undertaken by the SADF during that period. However, his absence from military affairs meant he was no longer in a position to counter the hawkish position of P.W. Botha and the defence establishment. When Vorster voluntarily stepped down late that year, he was succeeded by Botha as prime minister. His final act in office was to reject a proposal drafted by UN Secretary General Kurt Waldheim for a ceasefire and transition to Namibian independence.

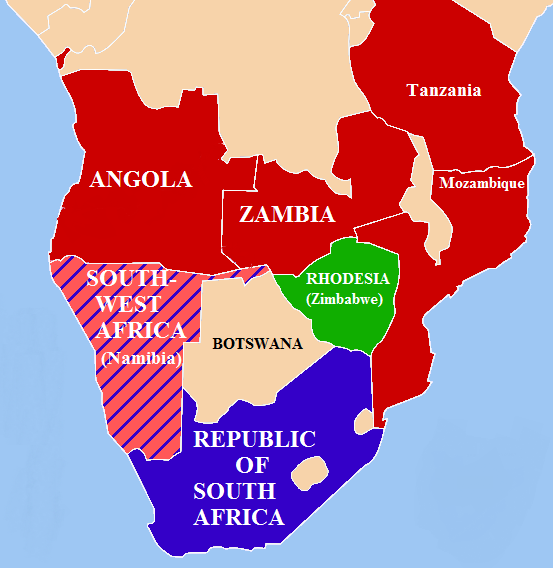
Geopolitical situation, 1978–79. SWAPO allies South African allies South West Africa (Namibia) South Africa

Defence chiefs such as General Magnus Malan welcomed Botha's ascension, blaming previous battlefield reversals—namely, Operation Savannah—on Vorster's indecisive and "lackluster" leadership. Botha had generated a reputation for being a tenacious, uncompromising leader who would use South Africa's position of military strength to strike hard at its foreign enemies, particularly to retaliate against any form of armed provocation. He criticised the West and the US in particular as being unwilling to stand up to Soviet expansionism, and declared that if South Africa could no longer look to the "free world" for support, then it would prevent further communist inroads into the region itself. Within the first three months of his premiership, the length of military service for white conscripts was doubled, and construction began on several new SADF bases near the border. Although little in the tactical situation had changed when Botha assumed office, patrols now crossed into Angola much more frequently to intercept and destroy PLAN cadres along their known infiltration routes.

PLAN was attempting to rebuild its forward operating bases after the loss of Chetequera. The insurgents had also been incensed by the Cassinga raid and publicly threatened retribution. "Strike a hard blow which Pretoria will not forget in a long time," deputy PLAN commander Solomon Huwala stated in a written directive to his staff. "We have been concentrating on attacking military targets and their forces, but they have decided to kill women and children. Cassinga must be revenged." It was from this communique that the name of the next major PLAN offensive was derived: Operation Revenge. After some deliberation, Huwala chose Katima Mulilo as his target and dispatched several PLAN reconnaissance teams to obtain data on firing positions and potential artillery observation posts. On 23 August 1978, PLAN bombarded Katima Mulilo with mortars and rocket fire, killing 10 SADF personnel. The next day, General Viljoen, General Geldenhuys and the Administrator-General of South West Africa flew out to Katima Mulilo to inspect the damage. All three narrowly escaped death when their SA.321 Super Frelon helicopter took ground fire from PLAN anti-aircraft positions at Sesheke. The SADF responded by bombarding Sesheke with its own artillery and making a sweep for PLAN insurgents up to a hundred kilometers north of the Cutline.

On 6 March 1979, Prime Minister Botha ordered retaliatory strikes on selected targets in Angola and Zambia. The respective code names for the operations were Rekstok and Saffraan. Heliborne South African troops landed in the vicinity of four Angolan settlements: Heque, Mongua, Oncocua, Henhombe, and Muongo, which they canvassed for guerrillas. The SADF remained in Zambia for a significantly longer period, carrying out a series of uneventful combat patrols and ambushes for five weeks. While Operations Rekstok and Saffraan were unsuccessful in terms of tactical results, they did interrupt PLAN's attempts to rebuild its base camps near the border. Most of the insurgents apparently concealed their arms and vanished into the local population. This proved less successful in Zambia, where the civilians in Sesheke District were irritated by the constant presence of South African patrols and reconnaissance aircraft; they demanded their government remove the remaining PLAN fighters. President Kaunda subsequently bowed to pressure and ordered PLAN to close its rear base facilities in Zambia, resulting in the collapse of its Caprivi insurgency.

On 16 March, Angola lodged a formal complaint with the UN Security Council concerning the violation of its borders and airspace as a result of Operation Rekstok. United Nations Security Council Resolution 447 was passed in response. The resolution "condemned strongly the racist regime of South Africa for its premeditated, persistent, and sustained armed invasions of the People's Republic of Angola, which constitute a flagrant violation of the sovereignty and territorial integrity of the country as well as a serious threat to international peace and security". A UN commission of inquiry logged 415 border violations by the SADF in 1979, an increase of 419% since the previous year. It also made note of 89 other incidents, which were mostly airspace violations or artillery bombardments that struck targets on Angolan soil.

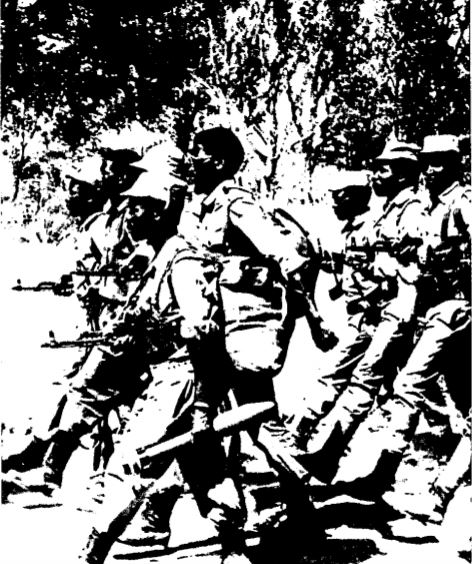
PLAN guerrillas on the march.

US–South African relations took an unexpected turn with Ronald Reagan's electoral victory in the 1980 US presidential elections. Reagan's tough anti-communist record and rhetoric was greeted with cautious optimism by Pretoria; during his election campaign he'd described the geopolitical situation in southern Africa as "a Russian weapon" aimed at the US. President Reagan and his Assistant Secretary of State for African Affairs Chester Crocker adopted a policy of constructive engagement with the Botha government, restored military attachés to the US embassy in South Africa, and permitted SADF officers to receive technical training in the US. They believed that pressure tactics against South Africa would be contrary to US regional goals, namely countering Soviet and Cuban influence. In a private memo addressed to the South African foreign minister, Crocker and his supervisor Alexander Haig declared that "we [the US] share your view that Namibia must not be turned over to the Soviets and their allies. A Russian flag in Windhoek is as unacceptable to us as it is to you". Washington also ended its condemnation of SADF cross-border raids, which was perceived as tacit support for the latter's actions in Angola and elsewhere. This had the effect of encouraging Botha to proceed with larger and increasingly more ambitious operations against PLAN. Between 1980 and 1982 South African ground forces invaded Angola three times to destroy the well-entrenched PLAN logistical infrastructure near the border region. The incursions were designated Operation Sceptic, Operation Protea, and Operation Daisy, respectively.

While Operation Rekstok was underway in March 1979, PLAN cadres retreated further into Angola and regrouped. Upon the SADF's departure, they had returned to their border sanctuaries, resuming raids, ambushes, and infiltration attempts. South African outposts in Ovamboland were subjected to constant mortar and rocket attacks. A year after Rekstok's conclusion, PLAN attacked the South African Air Force base at Ondangwa, destroying several aircraft and inflicting casualties. FAPLA continued to open its arsenals and training camps to Nujoma's army, and with Cuban assistance PLAN established its first conventional heavy weapons units, including a mechanised brigade. The insurgents also reorganised a segment of eastern Ovamboland into "semi-liberated" zones, where PLAN's political and military authorities effectively controlled the countryside. Ovambo peasants in the semi-liberated zones received impromptu weapons instruction before being smuggled back to Angola for more specialised training.

==== Operation Protea ====
Between 1979 and 1980, the pace of infiltration had accelerated so greatly that the SADF was forced to mobilise its reserves and deploy another 8,000 troops to South West Africa. The deeper South African raids struck into Angola, the more the war spread, and by mid-1980 the fighting had extended to a much larger geographic area than before. Operation Sceptic, then the largest combined arms offensive undertaken by South Africa since World War II, was launched in June against a PLAN base at Chifufua, over a hundred and eighty kilometres inside Angola. Chifufua, codenamed Objective Smokeshell, was divided into a dozen well fortified complexes ringed with trenches, defensive bunkers, and anti-aircraft positions. The SADF killed over 200 insurgents and captured several hundred tonnes of PLAN munitions and weaponry at the cost of 17 dead. Operation Protea was mounted on an even larger scale and inflicted heavier PLAN casualties; unlike Sceptic, it was to involve significant FAPLA losses as well as the seizure of substantial amounts of Angolan military hardware and supplies. Protea was planned when the SADF first became aware of PLAN's evolving conventional capabilities in August 1981. Its targets were suspected PLAN bases sited outside major FAPLA installations at Ondjiva and Xangongo. Attacking either settlement was considered especially risky due to the presence of Soviet advisers and a comprehensive local FAPLA air defence network.

Since the first formal cooperation treaties between Angola and the Soviet Union in 1976, the military sphere had constituted the pivot of Angolan-Soviet relations. The Soviet Navy benefited from its use of Angolan ports to stage exercises throughout the southern Atlantic and even negotiated with FAPLA for the construction of permanent bases. Luanda was named the regional headquarters for the 30th Operation Squadron of the Soviet Navy's Northern Fleet, which comprised eleven warships, three of which were in the port at any given time. From January 1976 onward, it also replaced Conakry as the primary base for Soviet Tupolev Tu-95 reconnaissance flights along Africa's western coast. Article 16 of the Angolan constitution banned the construction of foreign military bases, but exceptions could be made if base rights were considered essential to the country's national defence. The Soviet Union justified its continued air and naval presence as necessary measures to protect Angola from a South African invasion. One senior Soviet military official, General Valery Belyaev, remarked that the 30th Operational Squadron was, "by the very fact of its presence...restraining the South African aggression against Angola."

In exchange for granting base rights, FAPLA became the beneficiary of more sophisticated Soviet arms. After Operation Sceptic, the Soviet Union transferred over 500 million dollars' worth of military equipment to FAPLA, the bulk of it apparently concentrated on air defence. This made South African raids costlier in terms of the need to provide heavier air cover and likely casualties. With the adoption of more advanced weaponry, the contribution by Soviet technical and advisory support to FAPLA's operational capabilities also became increasingly crucial. Totalling between 1,600 and 1,850 advisers by 1981, the Soviet military mission to Angola was deployed within all branches of the Angolan armed forces.

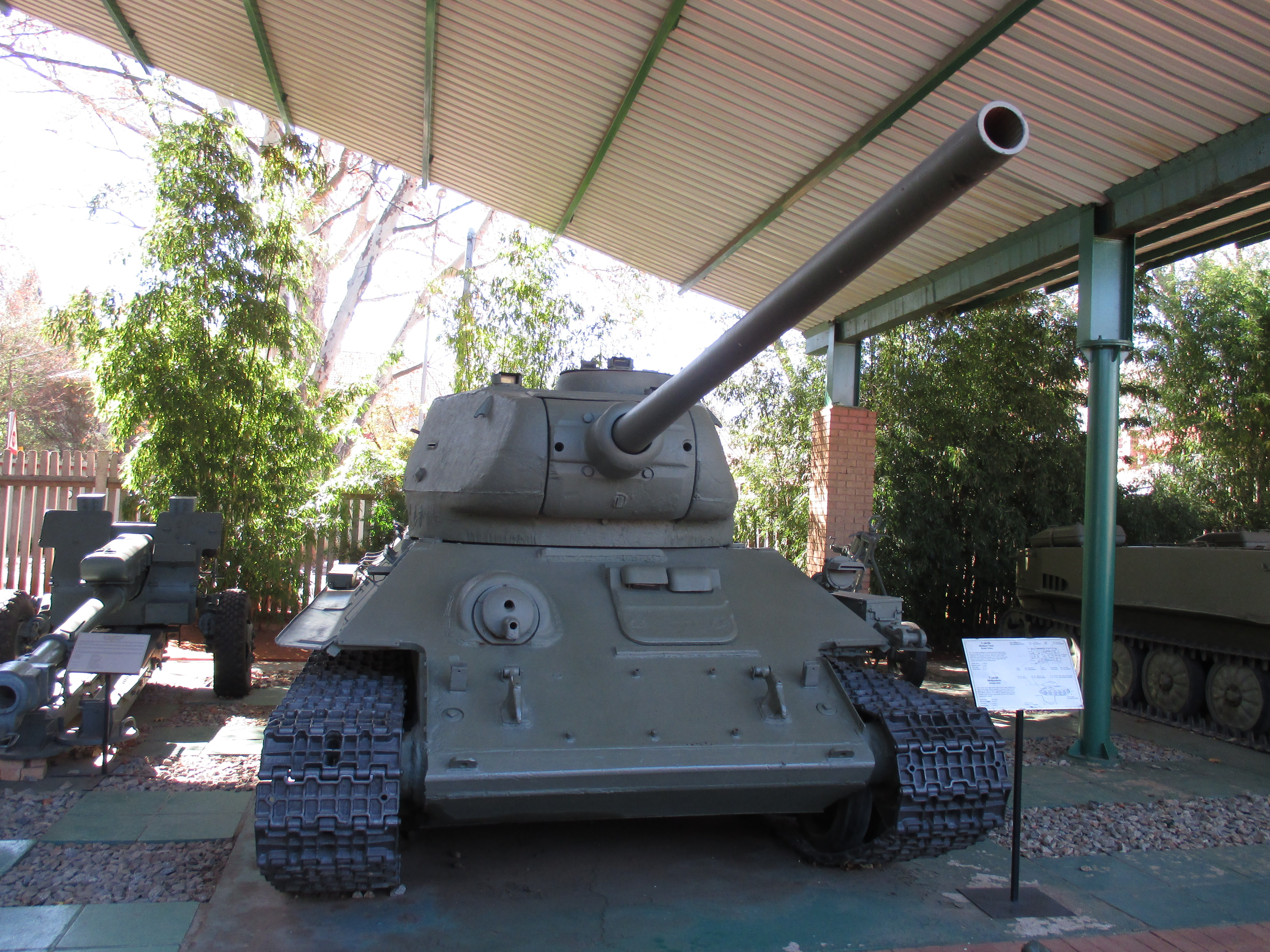
FAPLA T-34-85 tank captured by the SADF during Operation Protea.

A few weeks prior to Operation Protea, SADF General Charles Lloyd warned Botha that the introduction of early-warning radar and 2K12 Kub "SA-6" missiles in southern Angola was making it difficult to provide air support to ground operations there. Lloyd mentioned that FAPLA's buildup of modern Soviet arms was making a conventional war more likely. The objectives of Operation Protea shifted accordingly: aside from the PLAN camps, the SADF was ordered to neutralise several Angolan radar and missile sites and command posts. Eight days of bloody fighting occurred before two South African armoured columns were able to overrun Ondjiva and Xangongo. The SADF destroyed all of FAPLA's 2K12 missile sites and captured an estimated 3,000 tonnes of Soviet-manufactured equipment, including a dozen T-34-85 and PT-76 tanks, 200 trucks and other wheeled vehicles, and 110 9K32 Strela-2 missile launchers. The SADF acknowledged 14 dead. Combined FAPLA and PLAN losses were over 1,000 dead and 38 taken prisoner. The Soviet military mission suffered 2 dead and 1 taken prisoner.

Operation Protea led to the effective occupation of forty thousand square kilometres of Cunene Province by the SADF. On 31 August, the US vetoed a UN Security Council resolution condemning the incursion and demanding the immediate and unconditional withdrawal of the SADF from Angola. Intelligence gained during Protea led to Operation Daisy in November 1981, the deepest SADF incursion into Angola since Operation Savannah. This time, South African ground forces struck three hundred kilometres north of the border to eliminate PLAN training camps at Bambi and Cheraquera. On that occasion, the SADF killed 70 PLAN insurgents and destroyed several small caches of arms. PLAN learned of the attack in advance and had nearly completed its withdrawal when the SADF arrived; the insurgents fought a brief delaying action rather than attempt to defend their bases.

The air war over Angola expanded with the ground fighting. FAPLA's modest air force, consisting of a handful of transports and a few MiG-21s, maintained a large base at Menongue. During Protea and Daisy the SADF scrambled its own fighters to overfly the base during ground operations and prevent the FAPLA aircraft from taking off. The Soviets had begun training Angolan MiG pilots, but in the meantime Cubans shouldered the burden of the air war in Angola, flying in support of both FAPLA and PLAN. In November 1981 a MiG-21MF with a Cuban pilot was shot down by South African Mirage F1CZs over the Cunene River. The Mirages reportedly downed a second MiG in October 1982, however this second shootdown has been disputed by Cuban sources.

The expulsion of FAPLA from most of Cunene Province marked a revival of fortunes for Jonas Savimbi and his rump UNITA movement, which was able to seize undefended towns and settlements abandoned in the wake of Operations Protea and Daisy. Savimbi focused on rebuilding his power base throughout southeastern Angola while FAPLA and its Cuban allies were otherwise preoccupied fighting the SADF. For its part, the SADF allowed UNITA's armed wing to operate freely behind its lines; by early 1983 Savimbi's insurgents controlled most of the country south of Benguela Province.

=== Cuban linkage and "Namibianisation" ===
During his final years in office, Vorster had recognised that growing international pressure would eventually force South Africa to grant some form of autonomy or independence to South West Africa. He made token acknowledgements of the UN's role in deciding the territory's future and his administration had publicly renounced the notion of annexation. As Vorster's successor, Botha felt bound by this commitment—at least in principle—to an autonomous South West Africa. His strategy was to cultivate a viable political alternative to SWAPO, preferably moderate and anti-communist in nature, which was committed to close military and security links with South Africa. In the meantime, Botha forestalled further discussions on an internal settlement by demanding the withdrawal of the Cuban armed forces from Angola as a precondition of Namibian independence. Botha argued that the Cuban presence in Angola constituted a legitimate security concern for South West Africa, so it was not unreasonable that independence be contingent on a prior Cuban withdrawal. This initiative was supported by the US, which wanted a Namibian settlement consistent with Western interests, namely a region free of what Chester Crocker termed "Soviet-Cuban military adventurism". Crocker endorsed the linkage since it was related to South West Africa's security situation, which needed to be stabilised prior to independence. Botha's precondition was denounced by SWAPO for arbitrarily tying South West Africa's fate to the resolution of another regional conflict. Some Western powers also disapproved of Cuban linkage; for example, the French government issued the statement that it was inappropriate "the Namibian people should serve as hostages" to broader US foreign policy goals. The Cuban government interpreted linkage as further proof that South Africa was a foreign policy pawn of the US, and believed it to be part of a wider diplomatic and military offensive by the Reagan administration against Cuban interests worldwide.

Botha called on other African states and Western nations to back his demands: "say to the Cubans 'go home' and say to the Russians 'go home', and the minute this happens I will be prepared to settle all our military forces inside South Africa". Botha also assured the UN that he would take steps to prepare South West Africa for independence "as long as there are realistic prospects of bringing about the genuine withdrawal of Cuban troops from Angola". The linkage of Namibian independence to the Cuban presence in Angola proved controversial, but it did involve the two Cold War superpowers—the US and the Soviet Union— in a joint mediation process for resolving the South African Border War at the highest level. In September 1982 Crocker met with Soviet Deputy Foreign Minister Leonid Ilichev for talks on the issue of Cuban-Namibian linkage. His deputy, Frank G. Wisner, held a series of parallel discussions with the Angolan government. Wisner promised that the US would normalise diplomatic and economic relations with Angola in the event of a Cuban withdrawal.

To demonstrate South African commitment to Namibian independence, Botha permitted a moderate, multi-party coalition to create a South West African interim government in August 1983, known as the Multi-Party Conference and subsequently as the Transitional Government of National Unity. Provision was made for an executive and legislative assembly, and the new government was bestowed with all the powers formerly held by the territory's Administrator-General. The rise of an interim government was accompanied by a defence policy dubbed "Namibianisation", a reference to the Vietnamization programme the US had pursued during the Vietnam War. Increasingly the South African war effort rested on what limited white manpower could be raised in South West Africa itself, and local black units drawn from the San, Ovambo, Kavango, and Lozi ethnic groups. The main objectives of Namibianisation were to establish a self-sufficient military infrastructure in South West Africa, reduce casualty rates among South African personnel, and reinforce the perception of a domestic civil conflict rather than an independence struggle.

The SADF had started recruiting black South West Africans in 1974 and established segregated military and paramilitary units for semi-autonomous tribal entities such as Ovamboland two years later. PLAN had previously benefited from the deployment of white South African conscripts, reservists, and policemen unfamiliar with the terrain or environment; indigenous recruits were perceived as a means of mitigating this disadvantage. In April 1980, Administrator-General Gerrit Viljoen announced that transfer of some control over military and police forces to South West Africans would occur once the necessary structures were implemented. Through its defence headquarters in Windhoek, the SADF had exercised final authority on all military resources and counter-insurgency efforts. In theory, these arrangements were modified by the establishment of the South West African Territorial Force (SWATF) and the South West African Police (SWAPOL), since both of these forces were placed under the control of the interim government; the latter was also empowered to implement and oversee conscription as it saw fit. However, the SADF retained functional command of all military units; the senior general officer of the SADF in South West Africa also doubled as commander of the SWATF. By the mid 1980s the SWATF numbered about 21,000 personnel and accounted for 61% of all combat troops deployed along the Cutline. Both the SWATF and the Government of National Unity remained dependent on massive SADF military support.

=== Operation Askari ===
Operation Protea had exposed a glaring lack of professionalism on the part of FAPLA units, which had relied too heavily on their Soviet advisers and were almost immediately routed once they had to leave their fortified bases. In terms of training, morale, organisation, and professional competence—including the ability to operate its own equipment with effectiveness—the Angolan army had proved decidedly vulnerable. Protea indicated that it was in no condition to repel or even inflict serious losses on the South African expeditionary troops, resulting in a ratio of casualties almost overwhelmingly in the SADF's favour. That debacle led to a greater FAPLA dependency on augmented Cuban forces and another large arms deal, valued in excess of one billion dollars, being signed with the Soviet Union. Defence expenditures increased to consume 50% of Angola's state budget by the end of 1982. FAPLA embarked on a massive recruiting drive, purchased new T-54/55 and T-62 tanks from the Soviet Union, and took delivery of about thirty new combat aircraft, including twelve Sukhoi Su-20 strike fighters. It also ordered more air search radars and surface-to-air missiles to replace those destroyed in Protea.

While Namibianisation altered the tactical realities of the war on the Cutline, the SADF was planning a fourth operation modelled after Sceptic, Protea, and Daisy. In April 1982, PLAN insurgents killed 9 South African soldiers near Tsumeb, over 200 kilometres south of the border. South Africa claimed 152 security-related incidents involving PLAN occurred in South West Africa that year, and acknowledged the combat deaths of 77 SADF and SWATF personnel. In July 1983 PLAN carried out its first major act of urban sabotage, detonating a bomb in the centre of Windhoek, which caused extensive property damage but no civilian injuries. Infiltration of Ovamboland and Kavangoland increased dramatically at around the same time, with 700 insurgents entering both regions. The SADF claimed to have killed or captured just under half the insurgents by May, but was unable to prevent the others from making their way further south. These developments indicated that PLAN had not lost its will to persevere despite the enormous materiel losses sustained during Protea, and the infiltration of men and supplies into South West Africa continued apace.

Their confidence buoyed by the previous successful incursions into FAPLA-held territory, which had achieved marked success at only minimal cost in lives and materiel, Botha and his defence chiefs scheduled Operation Askari for December 1983. Like Protea, Askari was a major combined arms assault on PLAN base areas and supply lines in Angola; it also targeted nearby FAPLA air-defence installations and brigade headquarters. According to General Georg Meiring, commander of the SADF in South West Africa, Askari would serve the purpose of a preemptive strike aimed at eliminating the large numbers of PLAN insurgents and stockpiles of weapons being amassed for the annual rainy season infiltration.

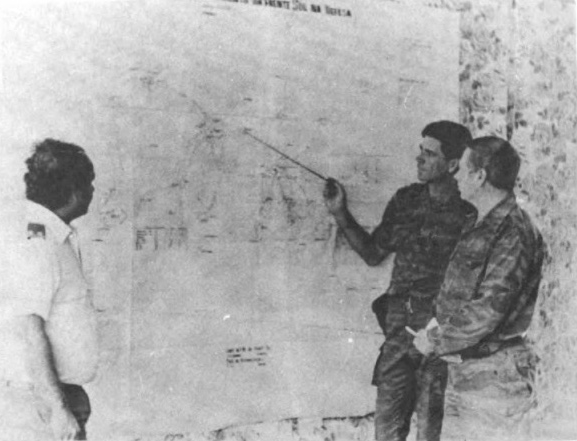
Soviet military advisers planning FAPLA operations in southern Angola.

The buildup of South African armour and artillery on the border did not go unnoticed; by late November the Soviet Union had enough satellite reconnaissance photographs and other intelligence to deduce that the SADF was preparing for another major incursion into Angola. During a private meeting arranged at the Algonquin Hotel by UN Secretary-General Javier Pérez de Cuéllar at Moscow's request, Soviet diplomats informed their South African counterparts that further aggression towards FAPLA would not be tolerated. The Soviets threatened unspecified retaliation if FAPLA's grip on Angola disintegrated further as a result of Askari. Simultaneously, in a direct show of force, a Soviet aircraft carrier and three surface ships called at Luanda before rounding the Cape of Good Hope. This constituted the most powerful Soviet naval detachment which had ever approached within striking distance of South African waters. Botha was unmoved, and Askari proceeded as scheduled on 9 December. Its targets were several large PLAN training camps, all of which were located no more than five kilometres from an adjacent FAPLA brigade headquarters. The four local FAPLA brigades represented one-seventh of the entire Angolan army, and three had substantial Soviet advisory contingents. Soviet General Valentin Varennikov, who was instrumental in directing the Angolan defence, was confident that "given their numerical strength and armament, the brigades...[would] be able to repel any South African attack". FAPLA's Cuban allies were less optimistic: they noted that the brigades were isolated, incapable of reinforcing each other quickly, and possessed insufficient mobile anti-aircraft weapons to protect them outside their bases. The Soviets recommended a static defence, appealing directly to Angolan President José Eduardo dos Santos, while the Cubans urged a withdrawal. Caught between two conflicting recommendations, dos Santos hesitated, and the brigades were ultimately annihilated piecemeal by the advancing South African armoured columns. Amid the confusion, a number of Angolan troops managed to break out of the South African encirclement and move north to link up with Cuban units, but a total of 471 FAPLA/PLAN personnel were killed or captured.

Despite achieving their objectives during Operation Askari, the South African forces had encountered unexpectedly determined resistance from PLAN and FAPLA. The SADF acknowledged 25 killed in action and 94 wounded, the highest number of casualties suffered in any single operation since Operation Savannah. FAPLA also claimed to have shot down 4 South African aircraft.

=== Lusaka Accords ===
On 6 January 1984, United Nations Security Council Resolution 546 was adopted with thirteen votes in favour and two abstentions, by the US and UK. The resolution condemned Operation Askari and demanded South Africa's immediate and unconditional withdrawal from Angola. An earlier draft of the same text imposing mandatory trade sanctions on South Africa until it ceased cross-border raids was abandoned under American pressure. The Soviet Union announced that it had reached yet another, more comprehensive agreement with Angola to bolster FAPLA's defence capabilities, and delivered the public warning to South Africa that "further aggression cannot be left unpunished".

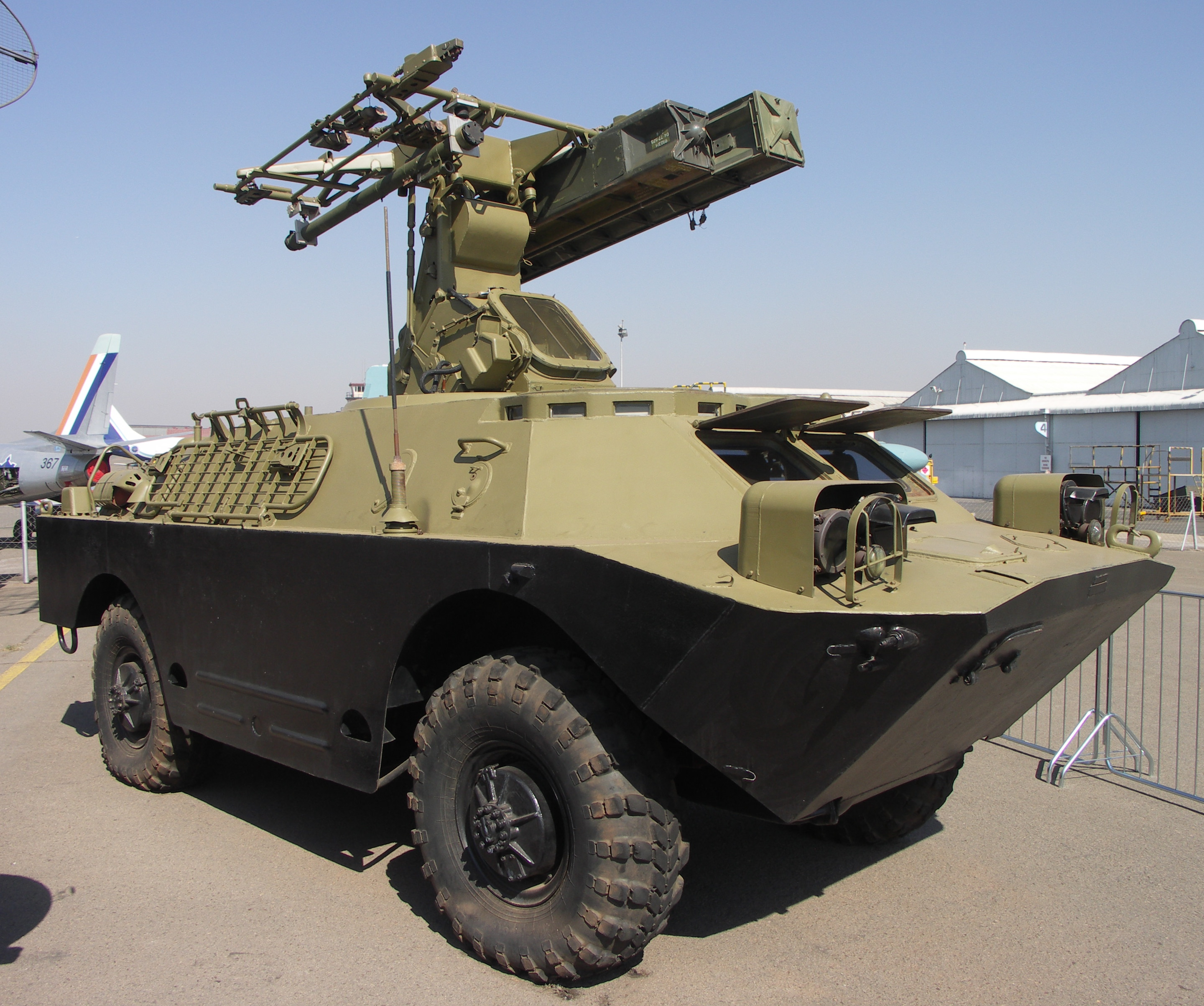
FAPLA 9K31 Strela-1 air defence system captured by the SADF during Operation Askari.

Askari had shaken the South African government's confidence in its ability to retain the military advantage indefinitely in Angola. Heavier and more sophisticated weapons were being used, the rate of casualties had increased, and the air superiority that had accounted for many of the SADF's previous successes was diminishing. Nor was Botha and his cabinet certain of continued political and diplomatic support from the US, which had chosen to abstain rather than exercise its veto with regard to UN Security Council Resolution 546. The Reagan administration perceived that both Angola and South Africa had grown weary of the war and were more susceptible to pressure for a ceasefire and mutual disengagement. American diplomats offered to mediate peace talks accordingly, and on 13 February South African and Angolan officials met for the first time in Lusaka. Three days later, South Africa announced that it would withdraw its expeditionary forces from Cunene Province by the end of March, provided the Angolans agreed to prevent PLAN from taking advantage of the situation to infiltrate South West Africa. The Angolan government pledged to restrain PLAN and MK, and to prohibit any movement of Cuban troops southward towards the border. These respective commitments were formalised as the Lusaka Accords. FAPLA and the SADF agreed to set up a Joint Monitoring Commission (JMC) to police the disengagement. Under the JMC, joint South African and Angolan patrols were carried out along six hundred kilometres of the border.

Cuba and the Soviet Union were not consulted on the Lusaka Accords until after they had been signed. In a heated exchange with President dos Santos, Fidel Castro complained, "the final decision was yours, not ours, but at least we could have talked beforehand, and we, as well as the Soviets, could have expressed our disagreement beforehand...both the Soviets and us, your two main allies, the two who support Angola, who have been making immense efforts on your behalf, we were faced with a fait accompli".

UNITA denounced the Lusaka Accords, insisting that any peace effort which excluded it would fail. PLAN also routinely violated the disengagement area, prompting the SADF to delay and later cancel its withdrawal. In July 1984 South Africa formally announced that it would not withdraw from Angola, citing widespread PLAN activity in the border region.

=== Operation Argon ===
The truce between South Africa and Angola survived only about fifteen months. Negotiations for completing the SADF withdrawal were stalled due to intransigence on both sides concerning the linkage policy, with the two governments clashing over timetables for the withdrawal of Cuban troops and Namibian independence, respectively. While the Soviet Union and Cuba did nothing to impede the dialogue, they feared that Luanda might sacrifice PLAN and MK by agreeing to expel them from the country. Castro confided to Soviet officials that he had no intention of authorising a withdrawal of Cuban forces if the Angolan government signed a non-aggression pact with South Africa similar to the Nkomati Accord. As a last resort, the Cuban presence in Angola would be maintained unilaterally for the purpose of aiding PLAN, with or without Luanda's approval.

In October 1984, dos Santos blamed South Africa for stalling the implementation of the Lusaka Accords and called for the US to resolve the impasse by exerting pressure on Botha. On 17 November, dos Santos proposed a five-point peace plan on the following terms: a complete SADF withdrawal from Angola, a renewed ceasefire agreement, a formal pledge by the South African government to begin implementing Namibian independence under the terms of United Nations Security Council Resolution 435, a formal pledge by the Angolan government to begin implementing a three year phased withdrawal of all but 5,000 Cuban troops, and recognition of SWAPO and Cuba as an equal party in negotiations. Botha wanted all the Cuban military personnel to be withdrawn, and over a period of twelve months rather than three years. He also countered that the Namibian independence process could only take place once the Cuban withdrawal was initiated.

The Lusaka Accords were abandoned in the wake of Operation Argon, a failed sabotage mission carried out by South African special forces in Angola's oil-rich Cabinda exclave. Four years of military escalation and massive defence expenditures had a drastic impact on Angola's state finances, which were only being balanced by petroleum revenue. The largest oil refinery in the country was located on the Cabindan coast and operated by a US firm, Gulf Oil, under the auspices of the Cabina-Gulf Oil National Petroleum Company of Angola (SONAGOL). By 1984 Gulf had invested over 1.3 billion dollars in its Cabinda operation, which was exporting 165,495 barrels of oil per day. At the time, the revenue from the Gulf refinery generated 90% of Angola's foreign exchange. The Reagan administration separated its political positions on Angola from its position on SONAGOL, with Crocker hoping that American multinational companies in general, and Gulf in particular, would be a moderating force on the Marxist government. South Africa had noted the critical importance of the refinery's contribution to the FAPLA war effort and had begun investigating ways to disrupt it without incurring the ire of the US, which would have to react if American commercial interests were threatened. The SADF believed that a covert sabotage operation was possible, as long as the destruction was not attributable to South Africa and a credible cover story could be used to link the attack to a domestic Angolan movement such as UNITA or the Front for the Liberation of the Enclave of Cabinda (FLEC). An attack on the oil platforms was ruled out, as this was beyond the capabilities of either UNITA or FLEC, so the SADF opted to infiltrate the refinery's oil storage facilities and mine the fuel tanks. The damage incurred would cripple Angola's ability to finance its military operations and give it greater economic incentive to accede to South African demands in the ongoing negotiations rather than risk returning to war.

The sabotage mission received the code name Operation Argon, and 15 South African special forces operators deployed to Cabinda by sea in May 1985. They were discovered by a FAPLA patrol during the infiltration attempt, and two of the raiders were shot dead with a third, Captain Wynand Petrus du Toit, being captured. Under interrogation, du Toit confessed that the objective of Argon was to sabotage the storage tanks at Cabinda Gulf. The South African government disavowed du Toit and denied responsibility, but General Viljoen later confirmed the SADF's role in the operation. Consequently, the ceasefire imposed as a result of the Lusaka Accords collapsed, and further peace talks were abandoned.

The diplomatic repercussions of Operation Argon's failure were immense. Castro believed the failed raid indicated that the US and South Africa were not truly committed to peace, and had been dishonest during the ceasefire negotiations. Angola announced it was no longer willing to consider a line of dialogue with South Africa on the Cuban withdrawal. The US condemned Operation Argon as an "unfriendly act by a supposedly friendly government".

== Drawdown in Angola (1985–1988) ==
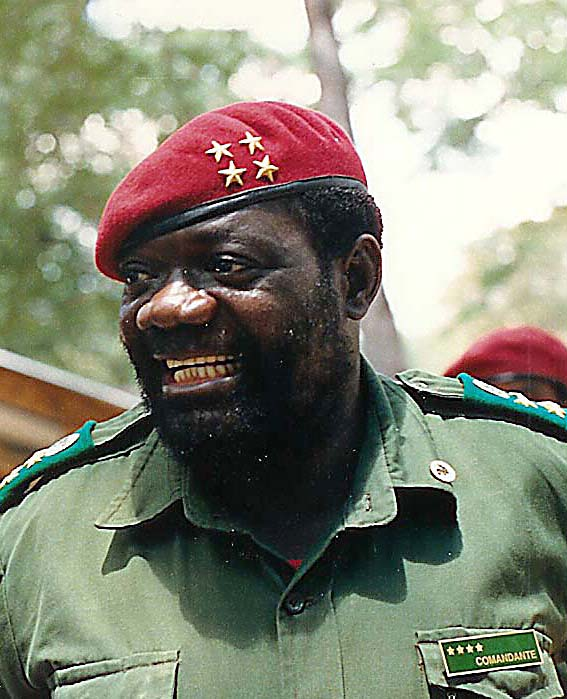
UNITA leader Jonas Savimbi.

In early 1984, just after South Africa and Angola had agreed to the principles of a peace settlement, UNITA had seized the opportunity to issue its own demanding conditions under which it would also accept the terms of a ceasefire. Savimbi requested a government of national unity with the MPLA in which he was granted a part, and threatened to begin attacking major cities if he was ignored. In this manner Savimbi sought to interlace conditionality over an SADF and FAPLA disengagement with his own conflict of interests with the Angolan regime. Although Botha approved of UNITA as an ostensibly anti-communist movement, he did nothing to impress Savimbi's demands on dos Santos. UNITA responded by raiding Sumbe, a settlement two hundred and sixty kilometres to the south of Luanda. That June, UNITA sabotaged the oil pipeline in Cabinda, kidnapping 16 British expatriate workers and a Portuguese technician. Six months later the insurgents raided Cafunfo, killing 100 FAPLA personnel. Most of these attacks were planned and executed from Jamba, a town in Cuando Cubango Province, which Savimbi had proclaimed UNITA's new national headquarters. Jamba had no prior strategic significance, possessed no agricultural base, and had limited access to fresh water, but it was located as far away from FAPLA bases as possible and within easy reach of SADF bases in Ovamboland and the Caprivi Strip. FAPLA had deserted the region for precisely this reason, withdrawing north after Operation Protea, but in the process left behind a power vacuum which Savimbi was quick to exploit. Savimbi used Jamba to augment UNITA's public image, investing heavily in local infrastructure. He opened the settlement to American and South African journalists, honed his public relations skills in frequent press conferences denouncing the MPLA, and lobbied for Western aid. Under the Reagan Doctrine, the US government opened covert channels to provide military assistance to UNITA. It repealed the Clark Amendment, which explicitly barred further CIA support for the UNITA and the FNLA, allowing the agency to resume Angolan operations. The Angolan government asserted this was "proof of the complicity there has always been between the US executive and the retrograde racist Pretoria regime" and it had "no alternative but to suspend the contacts it has had with US government envoys".

In 1986, Savimbi visited Washington, where he met with American officials and was promised military hardware valued at about 10 million dollars, including FIM-92 Stinger surface-to-air missiles and BGM-71 TOW anti-tank missiles. The US also pledged to continue its support for UNITA even if it lost the umbrella of protection conferred by the SADF presence in southern Angola.

At the US government's request, South Africa began lending UNITA a greater degree of material assistance, and aided the CIA in the acquisition of untraceable arms for the Angolan insurgents. The CIA was interested in acquiring Soviet and Eastern European arms for UNITA, as they could be easily passed off as weapons individual partisans had captured from FAPLA. South Africa possessed a vast stockpile of Soviet arms seized during Operations Sceptic, Protea, and Askari, and was persuaded to transfer some of it to UNITA.

=== Regional arms race ===
After Operation Savannah had failed to prevent the ascension of the MPLA in Angola, the South African political leadership generally accepted that reversing that verdict by force was unrealistic. At the same time, Vorster and Botha had recognised that a total military defeat of PLAN was elusive without the impossible corollary of a victory over the combined FAPLA-PLAN alliance in Angola. Some hardliners in their respective administrations wanted South Africa's full military weight behind Savimbi to help him extinguish the MPLA government, while others favoured simply using it to wage a limited containment exercise against PLAN. An offensive strategy which offered the chance to aggressively attack Angola by land, sea, and air and focus directly on the MPLA's centres of power was never discussed and became more remote as time went on. In its place, therefore, the other popular option was promulgated, which was to focus chiefly on fighting PLAN, the primary threat within the geographical limits of South West Africa proper, and attempting to intimidate Angola in the form of punitive cross-border raids, thus assuming an essentially defensive posture.

While Botha never seriously considered the overthrow of the MPLA as a viable objective, he endorsed increasing aid to UNITA for several reasons: it would mend diplomatic relations with the US, especially after the debacle of Operation Argon, UNITA could be molded into a proxy to harass PLAN, and donating captured weapons to Savimbi was cost-effective and deniable.

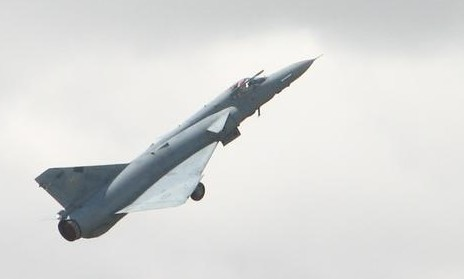
South African Atlas Cheetah fighter; this was developed as a direct response to Angola's adoption of more sophisticated Soviet combat aircraft.

US and South African justification for arming UNITA lay partly in the increased supply by the Soviet Union of more sophisticated weapons to FAPLA, as well as the increased number of Cuban troops in Angola, which had rapidly swelled from 25,000 to 31,000 by the end of 1985. While the Lusaka Accords were still in force, the Cuban and Soviet military delegations had urged dos Santos to take advantage of the ceasefire with the SADF to eliminate UNITA. There was a considerable increase in Soviet military assistance to Angola during this period, with the transfer of another billion dollars' worth of arms to FAPLA, including about 200 new T-55 and T-62 tanks. Moscow trained more Angolan pilots and delivered more advanced fighter aircraft to Luanda, particularly Mikoyan-Gurevich MiG-23s. Over a three year period Angola had become the second largest importer of arms on the African continent. FAPLA's arsenal expanded so exponentially that the SADF became convinced that the Soviet-sponsored arms buildup was intended for deployment elsewhere. General Malan gave a speech in which he expressed alarm at the "flood" of Soviet military equipment and its sophisticated nature, claiming that it was much more than needed to cope with the SADF's limited expeditionary forces and UNITA. Malan theorised that "the Russians want to develop a strong, stabilised base in Angola and then use the equipment and personnel positioned there wherever necessary in the subcontinent". South Africa gradually became locked in a conventional arms race with Angola; each side argued that it had to match the increased force available to the other. To counter the appearance of advanced MiG-23 and SU-22 fighters in Angola, for instance, South Africa began development on two sophisticated fighter aircraft of its own, the Atlas Cheetah and the Atlas Carver. Both programmes would consume billions of rand.

=== Battle of Cuito Cuanavale ===
==== Lomba River campaign ====
Intending to wrest back the initiative, sever UNITA's logistics lifelines to South West Africa and Zaire, and forestall any future insurgent offensives, FAPLA launched Operation Saluting October in mid-1987. The impetus for Saluting October likely originated with the Soviet military mission, which pressed the idea of a major conventional thrust to destroy UNITA's southeastern front as early as 1983. It had received a new commander that year, Lieutenant General Pyotr Gusev, former deputy commander of the Carpathian Military District. In light of the war's length, its cost, the rising death toll, and looming cuts in the Soviet military expenditure which would limit future efforts to support FAPLA's war effort, Gusev wanted a decisive multi-divisional offensive to crush UNITA once and for all. Operation Saluting October was a two-pronged offensive aimed at retaking three major settlements from UNITA, Cangamba, Cassamba, and Mavinga. The FAPLA command staff intended the attack on Cangamba and Cassamba as a feint, hoping to draw UNITA forces there and away from Mavinga. Once Mavinga was in government hands, FAPLA could expel the remaining insurgents from Moxico Province and pave the way for a final assault on Savimbi's headquarters at Jamba. Between 4 and 9 Soviet advisers were to be attached on the battalion level, albeit with strict orders not to participate in the fighting and withdraw from the front as necessary to avoid contact with UNITA. They were accompanied by a small number of Cuban advisers and East German technical personnel serving in a variety of support roles.

Gusev and his staff appealed to Moscow for more aid to FAPLA, particularly strike aircraft, for another offensive; this request was granted. In what had become an annual practice, an estimated billion dollars' worth of arms was flown into Luanda by Soviet Antonov An-24 flights, as many as 12 per day for a six-month period. The equipment was offloaded in the capital and transferred to Angolan Ilyushin Il-76s, which in turn flew them directly to the front.

To FAPLA, the experience of planning and executing an operation of such massive proportions was relatively new, but the Soviet military mission was convinced that a decade of exhaustive training on its part had created an army capable of undertaking a complex multi-divisional offensive. The Angolan brigade commanders had repeatedly expressed reservations about splitting the force and fighting on two fronts, arguing that a single assault on Mavinga would be more linear and sufficient. FAPLA's Cuban advisers objected on the grounds that South Africa might intervene on behalf of its erstwhile ally. "Don't get into such wasting, costly, and finally pointless offensives," Castro had vented to Gusev's staff. "And count us out if you do." General Arnaldo Ochoa, the senior Cuban military officer in Angola, also protested that the tactics FAPLA were being forced to adopt were more applicable to combat operations in central Europe than an offensive against an irregular fighting force on the broken African terrain. Ronnie Kasrils, MK's intelligence chief, warned the Soviet mission that if Saluting October proceeded an SADF counteroffensive was imminent. Gusev overruled the Cuban and MK concerns, and the operation commenced without contingency plans for a South African intervention.

The preliminary phase of the new offensive began in August 1987. Eight FAPLA brigades deployed to Tumpo, a region to the east of Cuito Cuanavale in early August, where on Soviet advice they temporarily paused for more supplies and reinforcements. This would prove to be a fatal error. On 14 August, having lost days of precious time, FAPLA resumed its efforts to advance; by then South Africa had launched Operation Moduler to halt the offensive. The bloody campaign that followed entailed a series of engagements known collectively as the Battle of Cuito Cuanavale.

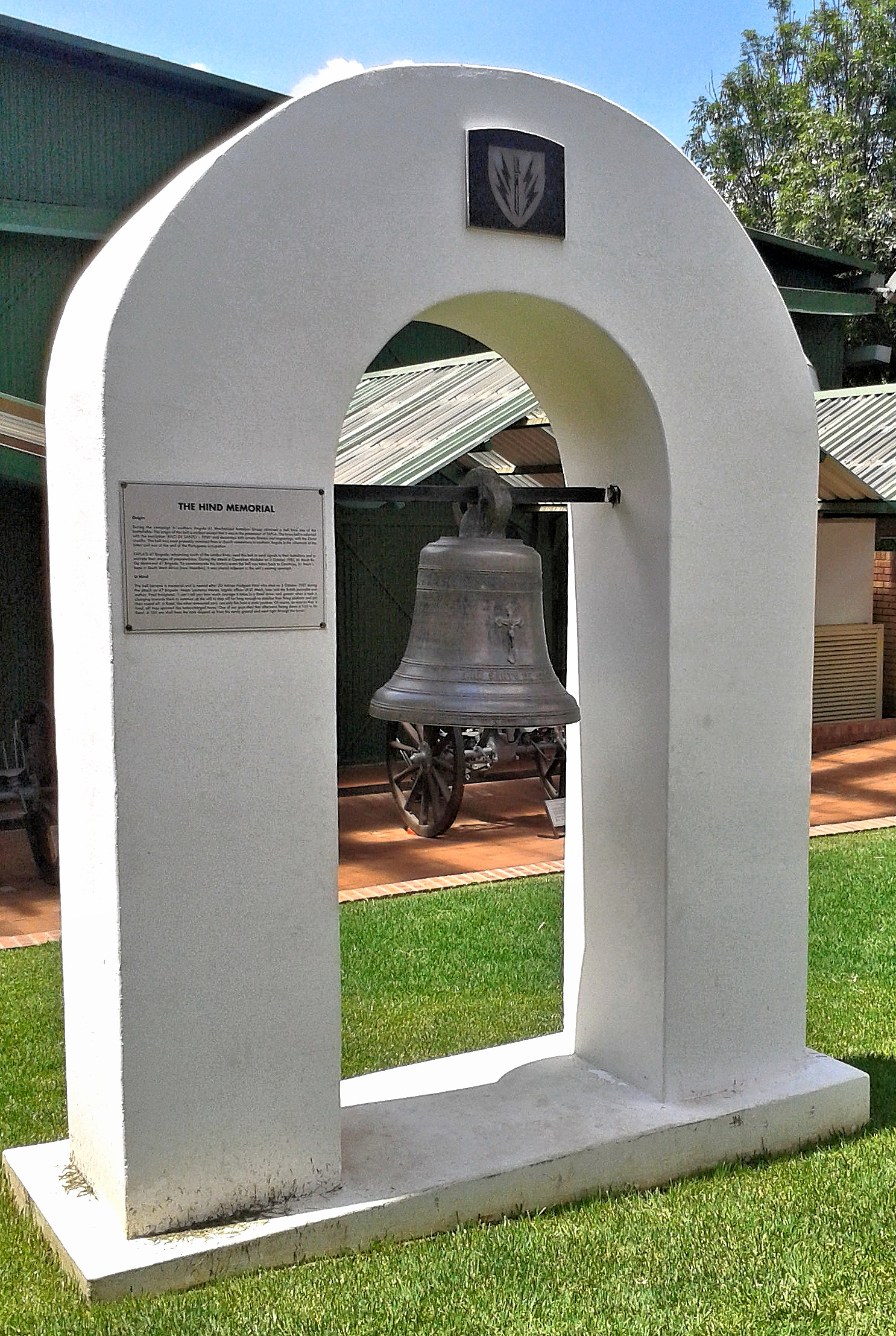
Signal bell used by FAPLA's 47 Infantry Brigade at the Lomba River.

Prior to 1987, the South African government was reluctant to become directly involved with its UNITA's internal struggle with Luanda, other than providing that movement with arms and some limited air and artillery support. (Note: For most of the 1980s, the only SADF troops attached to UNITA were a handful of special forces operators and technical advisers to assist in developing UNITA's combat capability. During Operation Wallpaper (1985) and Operation Alpha Centauri (1986), some South African air and artillery strikes had been carried out on FAPLA ground units in support of UNITA.) Nevertheless, Botha recognised that if Jamba fell, the buffer provided by UNITA's presence in southern Angola would collapse with it, and FAPLA would allow PLAN to gain direct access to its territory contiguous to the border. This would make PLAN infiltration of northern South West Africa almost impossible to check, especially in the Caprivi Strip and Kavangoland. As Cuban and MK sources had predicted, the commitment of regular ground troops alongside UNITA was authorised, albeit on the condition that strict control would be exercised over combat operations at the highest level of government to ensure that political and diplomatic requirements meshed with the military ones. The SADF took advantage of FAPLA's numerous delays to assemble a blocking force strong enough to stop the FAPLA drive on Mavinga. By the end of August, South Africa's expeditionary forces near Mavinga had built up to include 32 Battalion, 101 Battalion of the SWATF, and its elite 61 Mechanised Battalion Group.

There were three major rivers and nine tributaries between Cuito Cuanavale and Mavinga. Although none of the rivers were especially large, all the prospective crossing points were adjacent to vast expanses of swamps and waterlogged flood plains. These stalled the FAPLA advance and permitted the SADF to create effective choke points which further hampered FAPLA's progress. The South African general staff judged correctly that if these narrow entry points were seriously contested they had the potential to bottleneck the FAPLA brigades. They opted to launch a counteroffensive at the Lomba River, which was the last of the three rivers FAPLA had to cross before reaching Mavinga. The success of the South African counteroffensive was ensured by the rapid collapse of FAPLA's 47 Infantry Brigade, which was tasked with establishing a bridgehead on the Lomba's southern bank.

In conventional terms, the FAPLA brigades theoretically possessed more than enough strength and firepower to dislodge UNITA and the SADF from the Lomba River. But they were inadequately trained or experienced to counter the South African blocking force, which was composed of units selected for their experience in mobile bush warfare, and were outmanoeuvred in the thick foliage cover. The Lomba's swampy environment also hampered coordinated actions and allowed the SADF to isolate and rout each brigade in piecemeal engagements. Between September and October 1987 FAPLA suffered almost 2,000 casualties during several failed river crossings. With much of its bridging equipment destroyed, FAPLA abandoned the offensive and ordered its remaining brigades back to Cuito Cuanavale. The Soviet military mission had suffered 3 dead and at least 1 seriously wounded. The SADF had suffered 17 dead and 41 wounded, as well as the loss of 5 armoured vehicles.

During Operation Moduler, Cuban combat troops had remained well north of the Lomba River and declined to participate in the fighting, per Castro's instructions. In Luanda, President dos Santos summoned General Gusev and the senior Cuban general officer, Gustavo Fleitas Ramirez, for an urgent conference to discuss the worsening military situation and the failure of Operation Saluting October. Ramirez reminded dos Santos that Cuba had been opposed to the offensive from the beginning. Gusev lamented in his memoirs that "I informed [chief of the Soviet general staff] Akhromeyev about the result of the operation, but the most difficult task, in moral terms, was to inform the president of Angola, whom I had assured that the operation would succeed and that Savimbi would be crushed".

On 25 November 1987, United Nations Security Council Resolution 602 was passed, condemning Operation Moduler as an illegal violation of Angolan sovereignty. The resolution expressed dismay at the continued presence of SADF troops in Angola and called for their unconditional withdrawal. South African foreign minister Pik Botha flatly dismissed the resolution out of hand, citing the unaddressed issue of Cuban linkage. He promised that the SADF would depart Angola once FAPLA's Cuban and Soviet advisers had likewise been withdrawn, or when their presence no longer threatened South African interests.

==== Tumpo Triangle campaign ====
On 29 September P.W. Botha added a third objective to Operation Moduler: the destruction of all FAPLA units east of Cuito Cuanavale. The reasons for this shift in objectives once FAPLA had abandoned its offensive were not apparent to everybody in the South African government. Pik Botha and his senior colleagues in the foreign ministry cautioned against a major offensive north of the Lomba, citing potential diplomatic repercussions. But confidence in the SADF had been buoyed by its effective defence of the Lomba, and members of the South African general staff successfully agitated for a renewed offensive towards Cuito Cuanavale. It is unclear whether they interpreted their new objective as veiled permission to seize Cuito Cuanavale itself, although the option was discussed.

Per Botha's new directive, the SADF commenced Operation Hooper with the goal of encircling the retreating Angolan brigades and preparing for operations further east of the Cuito River. The decision to commence Hooper towards the end of the 1987 calendar year created problems for the SADF, since a number of white conscripts involved in the Lomba River engagements were nearing the end of their national service. This led to a delay of several weeks while the existing troops were gradually withdrawn from Angola and replaced with a new intake. The SADF had dispatched a second mechanised battalion, 4 South African Infantry, to Angola, as well as a squadron of Olifant Mk1A tanks and a battery of G5 and G6 howitzers. Between January and March 1988, the SADF and UNITA launched several bloody offensives just east of Cuito Cuanavale to destroy the shattered Angolan units that had succeeded in establishing a new defensive line there, an initiative which became known as Operation Packer. They managed to drive FAPLA deeper into a shrinking perimeter between the Cuito, Tumpo, and Dala rivers known as the "Tumpo Triangle".

A complete brigade of tanks...was advancing towards Cuito Cuanavale, where the Angolan troops in retreat from the South African attack were reassembling. We used helicopters to send in tank specialists, artillerymen, and experts in repairing military technology who could press into service the tremendous amount of Angolan technology and equipment that was there. Previous to that, we'd asked President José Eduardo dos Santos to turn over command of all the Angolan troops on the southern front to us.

— Fidel Castro recounts the buildup of Cuban troops in Angola in late 1987 and early 1988.

The Cubans and Soviets concurred with FAPLA's decision to withdraw to Cuito Cuanavale, with Castro pointing out that a strong defensive stand could plausibly be made there if the brigades managed to reach it. He also suggested that the only way to defeat the South African expeditionary forces in the long term was to outflank them and apply pressure to the South West African border. This would entail opening up yet another military front, in southwestern Angola, well south of Cuito Cuanavale. On 15 November, dos Santos had written a letter to Castro requesting direct Cuban military assistance against the SADF. Castro agreed on the condition that he and General Arnaldo Ochoa receive command of all FAPLA forces on the front. The Soviet military mission was notably excluded from all future operational planning. Shortly afterwards, the Cuban government authorised the deployment of an armoured brigade and several air defence units—about 3,000 personnel—to Cuito Cuanavale. Castro suspected that the South Africans would not be content with eliminating FAPLA east of the town and that they intended to take control of Cuito Cuanavale's strategic airfield as well. His strategy was to strengthen the defence of that settlement while making preparations to vastly increase the Cuban troop presence at Lobito, near the South West African border.

The FAPLA and Cuban defenders now ringed their defensive positions with minefields and interlocking fields of fire from dug-in tanks and field guns, into which they channelled SADF assaults. On multiple occasions the combined UNITA and SADF forces launched unsuccessful offensives which became bogged down in minefields along narrow avenues of approach and were abandoned when the attackers came under heavy fire from the Cuban and FAPLA artillerymen west of the Cuito River. The defenders' artillery was sited just beyond the maximum range of the South African artillery and on high ground which gave them a commanding view of the battlefield. This advantage, coupled with the proliferation of minefields, and heavily reinforced FAPLA-Cuban defensive positions rendered further attacks by the South African troops futile.

Operations Hooper and Packer were terminated after the SADF had killed almost 700 FAPLA troops and destroyed about half of the Angolan brigades' remaining tanks and armoured vehicles. Cuba had suffered 42 dead and the loss of 6 tanks. South African casualties were relatively light: 13 dead and several dozen severely wounded. Three SADF tanks were also abandoned in a minefield, while most of the others were damaged beyond immediate repair or rendered unserviceable due to mechanical problems. UNITA suffered thousands of casualties, prompting accusations that its troops had been used as "cannon fodder" by the SADF. Cuban post-action reports claimed that UNITA insurgents had been sent through the minefields at gunpoint to clear the way for the South African armour.

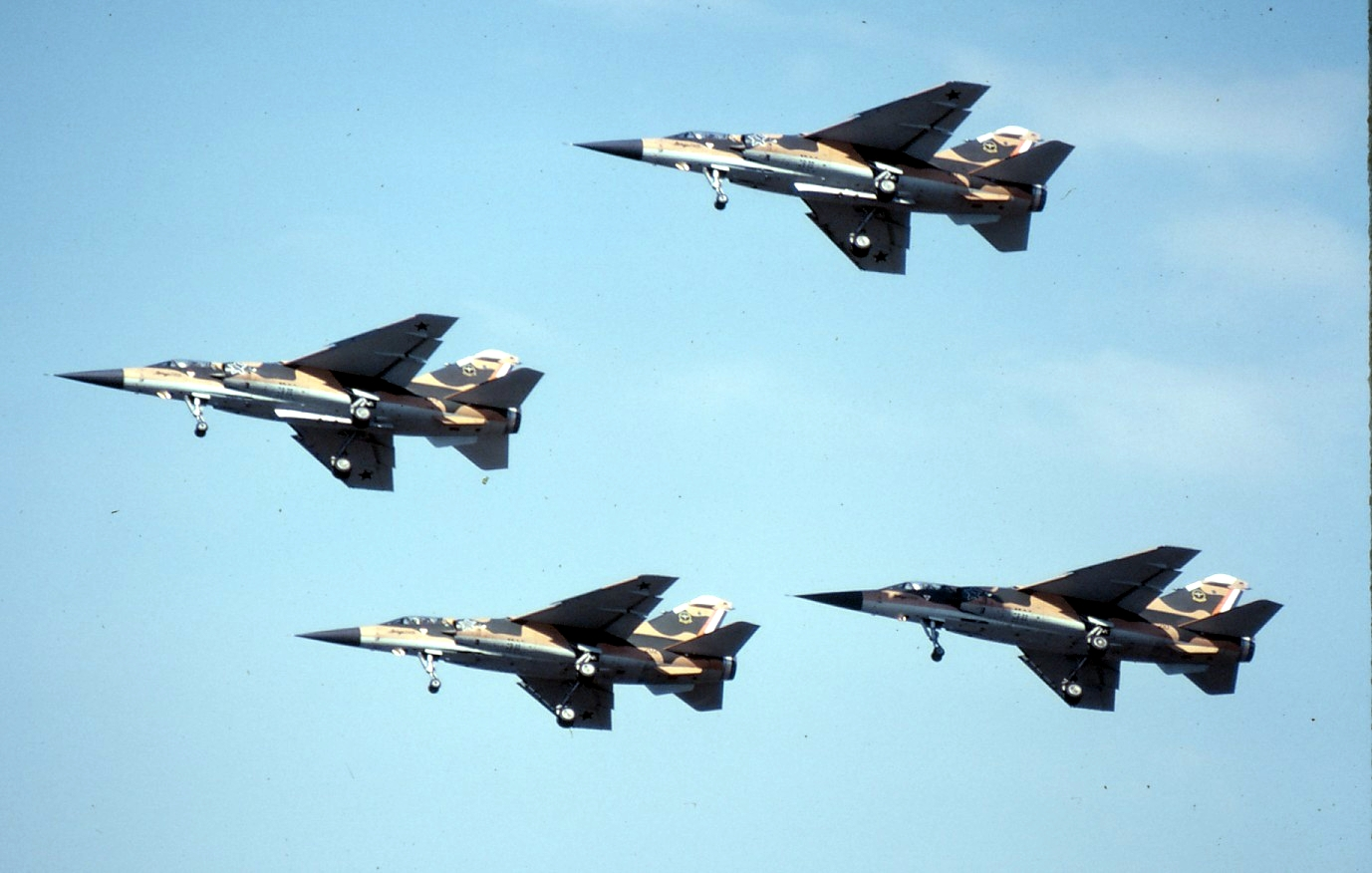
SADF Mirage F1s in close formation. The great distances they had to fly to reach the operational area would prove to be a handicap during Operations Hooper and Packer.

The Tumpo Triangle campaign exposed several flaws in the planning of the South African defence chiefs and general staff. They had estimated quite accurately that their forces would be able to inflict a crushing defeat on FAPLA in the flood plains and open terrain south of Cuito Cuanavale. But they had not anticipated so many Angolan units would survive and establish strong defensive lines in the Tumpo Triangle, or that the addition of Cuban troops there would stiffen the resistance considerably. Further South African miscalculations appeared in the latter phases of the campaign. One was the assumption that the small and highly mobile but lightly armed SADF expeditionary force was suited to mounting frontal attacks on well-prepared defenders supported by dug in artillery west of Cuito. The use of battalions trained and organised for mobile warfare in this manner was in violation of the SADF's own mechanised doctrine. The defending Angolans had ample dug-in artillery and the benefit of air cover: the Soviet Union's increased willingness to supply FAPLA with advanced fighter aircraft and even Soviet pilots on loan posed a serious threat to South African air operations over Cuito Cuanavale. As Soviet involvement grew, and the number of air battles increased, South Africa's air force began encountering MiG-23s flown by well-trained Soviet pilots. Furthermore, Angolan pilots newly trained under Soviet supervision at Lubango were proving more capable of challenging South African fighters. For the first time the SADF began losing aircraft in numbers, indicating the contested extent of the Angolan skies.

The SADF's declining air supremacy forced a number of operational changes. South African pilots exercised a standoff bombing capacity of twenty kilometres and timed their raids so they were out of range before FAPLA MiGs could be scrambled to intercept them. The necessity of avoiding prolonged aerial contact was partly dictated by fuel considerations: the SADF Mirage F1AZ and F1CZ fighters launched from distant bases in South West Africa, which meant they had barely enough fuel for three minutes of combat once they reached Cuito Cuanavale. The impact on ground operations was more consequential. FAPLA MiGs flew reconnaissance missions in search of the G5 and G6 howitzers, forcing the South African artillery crews to resort to increasingly elaborate camouflage and take the precaution of carrying out their bombardments after dark. Owing to the increase in losses and damage due to UNITA's US-supplied Stinger missiles, however, MiG pilots had to adopt contingencies of their own to reduce the vulnerability of their aircraft. Cuban and Angolan warplanes were forced to drop bombs from higher altitudes, greatly reducing their accuracy. FAPLA airfields were also monitored by South African forward artillery observers, who called in bombardments to destroy aircraft while they were exposed on the runway and preparing to take off.

=== Final Cuban offensive ===
Although the SADF and UNITA counteroffensive had been checked, FAPLA remained heavily strained and more dependent than before on its Cuban allies and Soviet materiel. This gave dos Santos an incentive to ease the military dilemma with negotiations and he reopened the possibility of reaching a new ceasefire and disengagement agreement with South Africa. As early as January 1987, Chester Crocker had responded to positive signals from Luanda, especially when President Denis Sassou Nguesso of the People's Republic of the Congo offered to mediate peace talks between the rival states. Yet preliminary discussions in Brazzaville throughout late 1987 and early 1988 remained stymied by the Angolan government's refusal to compromise on the timetable for a proposed Cuban withdrawal. The Cuban government had not been consulted on the Brazzaville talks in advance and resented what it perceived as a discourtesy on the part of dos Santos. This factor had the effect of persuading Castro to make an authoritative bid to join the Angolan-US peace talks. He was determined that Cuba no longer be excluded from negotiations concerning its own military, and the results of any future settlement on the withdrawal process leave Cuba's image untarnished.

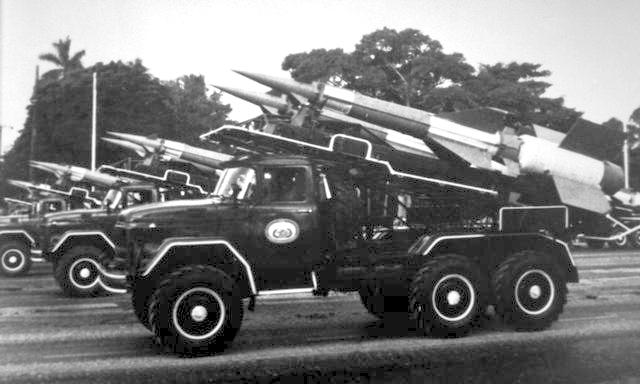
Cuban S-125 "SA-3 Goa" missile systems on parade. Many were shipped to Angola in 1988 to provide air cover for Castro's offensive.

While Operation Hooper was underway in late January 1988, Crocker relented to pressure and accepted Cuba as an equal partner in further peace talks. Castro agreed that he would not introduce extraneous issues to the agenda, such as Cuba–US relations, and that discussion of a phased troop withdrawal would extend to all Cuban military personnel stationed in Angola, including combat troops, logistical staff, and advisers. With Cuba's entry into the Brazzaville talks, its desire to shift its military involvement in Angola from a passive, defensive role to an offensive one intensified. Castro opted to escalate ground operations against the SADF, since he considered diplomatic progress impossible as long as South Africa still clung to the likelihood of a tactical victory. He retained a solely defensive posture at Cuito Cuanavale, keeping the SADF fixed in place, while carrying out his longstanding proposal to launch a flanking manoeuvre towards the South West African border. The new offensive would consist of a movement of Cuban forces in divisional strength west of the Cunene River.

On 9 March, Castro ordered all Cuban troops massed at Lobito, which had grown to about 40,000 men, southward. He likened their movement to "a boxer who with his left hand blocks the blow [at Cuito Cuanavale] and with his right – strikes [in the west]". "That way," Castro recounted on another occasion, "while the South African troops were being bled slowly dry in Cuito Cuanavale, down in the southwest...40,000 Cuban soldiers...backed by about 600 tanks, hundreds of artillery pieces, 1,000 anti-aircraft weapons, and the daring MiG-23 units that took over the skies, advanced towards the Namibian border, ready to sweep away the South African forces".

As the Cuban brigades advanced, they accumulated thousands of PLAN insurgents, who departed their bases to join the offensive. The presence of so many Cuban troops effectively resuscitated PLAN's sagging fortunes, as it curtailed new South African military initiatives against the insurgents not only in Angola but South West Africa as well. Firstly, the region being occupied by the Cubans just north of the border was the same territory the SADF had monitored and patrolled for almost a decade in order to prevent PLAN infiltration into Ovamboland. Secondly, all South African units near the border had ceased routine counter-insurgency operations while they were being mobilised to resist a potential Cuban invasion. Matters were complicated further when the Cubans formed three joint battalions with PLAN fighters, each with its own artillery and armoured contingents. Due to the integration of the insurgents with Cuban personnel at the battalion level, South African patrols found it impossible to engage PLAN in Angola without risking a much larger confrontation involving aggressive and well-armed Cuban troops.

The limited number of SADF troops available near the border could not halt the continued progress of the Cuban army or reduce the threat to South West Africa. There were simply too few personnel and resources to secure the broad defensive positions along the Cutline against a conventional force in divisional strength. Nevertheless, the SADF was able to slow the Cuban offensive with a series of effective delaying actions throughout mid-1988, an initiative known as Operation Excite. When South African officials warned against an invasion of South West Africa, Castro retorted that they were "in no position to demand anything". Havana also issued an ambiguous statement which read, "we are not saying we will not go into Namibia". The South African government responded by mobilising 140,000 reservists—a figure almost unprecedented in SADF history—and threatening severe repercussions on any Cuban unit which crossed the border.

=== 1988 Tripartite Accord ===
Despite taking the necessary countermeasures on the battlefield, the South African government discerned it had reached the political limits of further escalation in Angola. The casualties sustained during the Cuito Cuanavale campaign had been sufficient to cause public alarm and provoke difficult questions about the tactical situation on the border and why South African soldiers were dying there. There was little reason to believe yet another bloody campaign would be successful in expelling the Soviets and Cuba from the region; on the contrary, as in the past, it could lead to an increase in the amount of Soviet weapons and Cuban troops. The conflict had also evolved from a low-intensity struggle against lightly armed insurgents into protracted battles between armies backed by all the paraphernalia of modern conventional warfare, with the accompanying rise in human and material costs. This contributed to a sense of war weariness and increased the growing skepticism and sensitivity in civilian circles towards the SADF's Angolan operations.

The failure of the Soviet-supervised Operation Saluting October, along with the consequent destruction of hundreds of millions of dollars' of FAPLA's Soviet-supplied arms, had the effect of moderating Moscow's stance on Angola. In a notable departure from its previous foreign policy stance, the Soviet Union disclosed it too was weary of the Angolan and South West African conflicts and was prepared to assist in a peace process—even one conducted on the basis of Cuban linkage. Reformist Mikhail Gorbachev, General Secretary of the Communist Party of the Soviet Union, also wished to reduce defence expenditures, including the enormous open-ended commitment of military aid to FAPLA, and was more open to a political settlement accordingly.

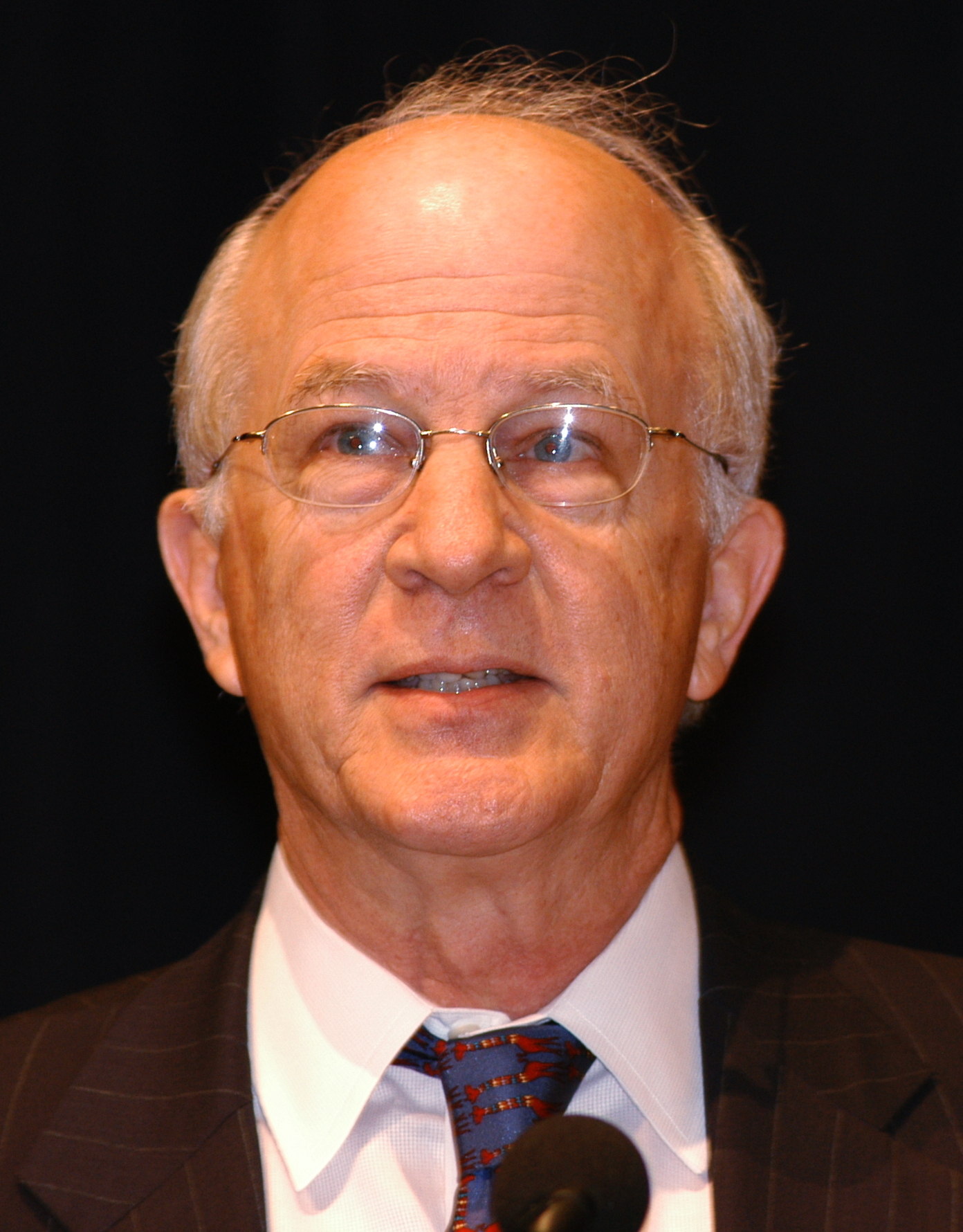
Chester Crocker, US diplomat. Crocker's influence and mediation was instrumental in talks which established the Tripartite Accord.

For South Africa and the Soviet Union—the two parties which had previously refrained from joining the US-mediated talks—the point had now been reached where the costs of continuing the war exceeded its anticipated benefits. This necessitated a change in perceptions in both nations, which began warming to the possibility of a negotiated peace. The Soviet government agreed to jointly sponsor with the US a series of renewed peace talks on 3 and 4 May 1988. For its part, South Africa made its first bid to join the tripartite negotiations and agreed to send a delegation of diplomats, intelligence chiefs, and senior SADF officers. The Soviet and US diplomats in attendance, including Crocker, made it clear to the South Africans that they wanted peace in Angola and a political settlement in South West Africa. They were also agreed on the need to bring pressure on their respective allies to bring about a solution. South Africa would be expected to comply with United Nations Security Council Resolution 435, in exchange for the complete withdrawal of Cuban troops from Angola. The Cuban and Angolan delegations had already assented to a complete Cuban withdrawal, and under US pressure produced an extremely precise timetable which extended this process over three to four years. South Africa found this unacceptable but conceded that the withdrawal could be timed to certain benchmarks in the Namibian independence process.

According to Crocker, the US decision to use Security Council Resolution 435 as the basis and pivot for a regional settlement provided leverage over the discussions. The proposed formation of a UN "verification mission" to monitor Cuba's adherence to a withdrawal settlement proved instrumental in persuading the South African government that it would receive a balanced agreement. The talks began progressing more smoothly after July 1988, when Carlos Aldana Escalante was appointed head of the Cuban delegation. Aldana was chief of ideological affairs and international relations for the Communist Party of Cuba; he was far better informed of foreign developments, particularly in the Soviet bloc, than many of his contemporaries. In light of Gorbachev's reforms, political developments in Eastern Europe, and the reduction of tensions between the superpowers, Aldana believed that Cuba needed to work swiftly towards normalising relations with the US. Cooperation vis-à-vis Southern Africa was seen as a natural prerequisite to better relations with Washington and possibly, a permanent bilateral dialogue.

Between May and September 1988, the parties met for several rounds of talks in Cairo, New York, Geneva, and Brazzaville, but remained deadlocked on the nuances of the withdrawal timetable. The fact that there were two objectives—Namibian independence and a Cuban withdrawal—doubly aggravated the issue of timing and deadlines. In August, the Angolan, Cuban, and South African delegations signed the Geneva Protocol, which established the principles for a peace settlement in South West Africa and committed the SADF to a withdrawal from that territory. As a direct result of the Geneva Protocol, PLAN declared a ceasefire effective from 10 August. The 1988 US presidential elections lent new urgency to the negotiations, which had recently stalled after six consecutive rounds of talks in Brazzaville. Angola and Cuba had gambled heavily on a victory for Michael Dukakis and the Democratic Party during the US elections, hoping that this would spell the end of US aid to UNITA and a harder line on South Africa. At the time of the Geneva Protocol, dos Santos had commented that "if the Democrats had won the elections, there would be a readjustment in US policy, particularly on Southern Africa". The election of Republican candidate George H. W. Bush had the effect of persuading the Angolan and Cuban delegations to be more flexible. (Note: As president, Bush was decidedly unsympathetic towards the Cuban-Angolan position in the Brazzaville talks; his administration described the Battle of Cuito Cuanavale as a "humiliating defeat" for FAPLA and may have believed dos Santos and Castro were negotiating from a position of military weakness.) Crocker reiterated on several occasions that a new US administration meant changes in personnel and basic policy review, and pressed them not to waste months of effort.

Three days after the US election results were released, the parties reconvened in Geneva and within the week had agreed to a phased Cuban withdrawal over the course of twenty seven months. In exchange, South Africa pledged to begin bestowing independence on South West Africa by 1 November 1989. On 13 December 1988, South Africa, Angola, and Cuba signed the Brazzaville Protocol, which affirmed their commitment to these conditions and set up a Joint Military Monitoring Commission (JMMC) to supervise the disengagement in Angola. The JMMC was to include Soviet and US observers. All hostilities between the belligerents, including PLAN, were to formally cease by 1 April 1989. On 22 December 1988, the Brazzaville Protocol was enshrined in the Tripartite Accord, which required the SADF to withdraw from Angola and reduce its troop levels in South West Africa to a token force of 1,500 within twelve weeks. Simultaneously, all Cuban brigades would be withdrawn from the border to an area north of the 15th parallel. At least 3,000 Cuban military personnel would depart Angola by April 1989, with another 25,000 leaving within the next six months. The remaining troops would depart at a date not later than 1 July 1991. An additional condition was that South Africa would cease all support for UNITA, and Angola likewise for PLAN and MK.

On 20 December 1988, United Nations Security Council Resolution 626 was passed, creating the United Nations Angola Verification Mission (UNAVEM) to verify the redeployment northwards and subsequent withdrawal of the Cuban forces from Angola. UNAVEM included observers from Western as well as non-aligned and communist nations. In February 1989 the United Nations Transition Assistance Group (UNTAG) was formed to monitor the South West African peace process.

== Namibian independence ==
The initial terms of the Geneva Protocol and Security Council Resolution 435 provided the foundation from which a political settlement in South West Africa could proceed: holding of elections for a constitutional assembly, confinement of both PLAN and the SADF to their respective bases, the subsequent phased withdrawal of all but 1,500 SADF troops, demobilisation of all paramilitary forces that belonged to neither the SADF nor to the police, and the return of refugees via designated entry points to participate in elections. Responsibility for implementing these terms rested with UNTAG, which would assist in the SADF withdrawal, monitor the borders, and supervise the demobilisation of paramilitary units.

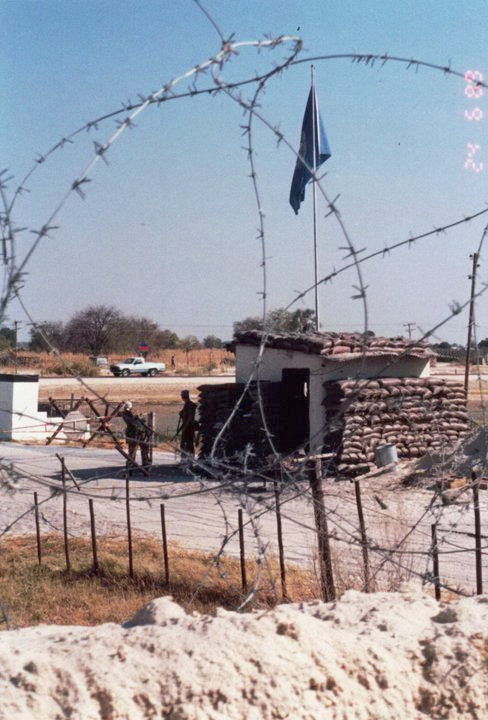
UNTAG checkpoint at Ondangwa, June 1989.

Controversy soon arose over the size of UNTAG's military component, as the member states of the Security Council expected to cover the majority of the costs were irritated by its relatively large size. However, Angola, Zambia, and other states sympathetic to PLAN insisted that a larger force was necessary to ensure that South Africa did not interfere with independence proceedings. Against their objections UNTAG's force levels were reduced from the proposed 7,500 to three battalions of 4,650 troops. This slashed projected expenses by nearly 300 million dollars, but the Security Council did not approve the revised budget until 1 March 1989. The inevitable delay in UNTAG's full deployment ensured there were insufficient personnel prepared to monitor the movement of PLAN and the SADF or their confinement to bases on 1 April 1989, when the permanent cessation in hostilities was to take effect. Secretary-General de Cuéllar urged restraint in the interim on both sides to avoid jeopardising the de facto ceasefire maintained since August 1988 or the 1 April implementation schedule. Nevertheless, PLAN took advantage of the political uncertainty in the weeks following the UNTAG budget debate to begin moving its forces in Angola closer to the border.

Since the early 1980s PLAN had consistently stated its intention to establish camps inside South West Africa during any future political transition, a notion rejected with equal consistency by the South African government. Compounding this fact was that PLAN insurgents also identified themselves as refugees without making any distinction between their civilian or military background, and the UN had explicitly invited refugees to return home. Indeed, PLAN did not possess many regular standing units and by the late 1980s many of its personnel followed cyclical patterns of fighting as insurgents before returning to refugee camps as civilians.

On 31 March 1989, Pik Botha complained to the JMMC that PLAN troops had advanced south of the 16th parallel and were massing less than eight kilometres from the border. He promptly intercepted UN Special Representative Martti Ahtisaari and UNTAG commander Dewan Prem Chand that evening and gave them the same information. On the morning of 1 April, the first PLAN cadres crossed into Ovamboland, unhindered by UNTAG, which had failed to monitor their activity in Angola due to the delays in its deployment. Ahtisaari immediately contacted SWAPO, ordering it to rein in PLAN, to little avail. The South African foreign ministry also contacted the Secretary-General, who in turn relayed the same message to SWAPO officials in New York.

At the end of the day, with no signs of the PLAN advance abating, Ahtisaari lifted all restrictions confining the SADF to its bases. Local police mobilised and fought off the invaders in a delaying action until regular SADF forces were able to deploy with six battalions. After the first two days the insurgents lost their offensive initiative, and the combined South African forces drove PLAN back across the border in a counteroffensive codenamed Operation Merlyn. Between 1 and 9 April 1989, 273 PLAN insurgents were killed in the fighting. The SADF and police suffered 23 dead. On 8 April 1989, the JMMC issued the Mount Etjo Declaration, which reiterated that the Tripartite Accord was still in effect and that South Africa, Angola, and Cuba remained committed to peace. It also ordered all PLAN insurgents remaining in Ovamboland to surrender at UNTAG-supervised assembly points.

Sam Nujoma denied any incursion had taken place on 1 April, claiming that he had only ordered PLAN insurgents already inside South West Africa to begin establishing base camps. He also pointed out that SWAPO had never been a signatory to the Tripartite Accord, and therefore the cessation of hostilities as dictated by its terms was non-binding. This drew some ire from Angola, which had given guarantees to the UN that PLAN would remain north of the 16th parallel. The SADF was re-confined to its bases on 26 April, then released into Ovamboland again to verify that the insurgents had departed. By May, all but a small handful of PLAN insurgents had been relocated north of the 16th parallel under JMMC supervision, effectively ending the South African Border War. (Note: Isolated pockets of PLAN insurgents which either disregarded or did not receive news of the Mount Etjo Declaration continued to skirmish with security forces until December 1989. The last SADF combat troops officially departed South West Africa in November 1989, although a brigade-sized battle group remained on standby in the enclave of Walvis Bay in the event major hostilities resumed. This formation was disbanded on 15 January 1990.)

General elections under a universal franchise were held in South West Africa between 7 and 11 November 1989, returning 57% of the popular vote for SWAPO. This gave SWAPO 41 seats in the territory's Constituent Assembly, but not a two-thirds majority which would have enabled it to unilaterally draft a constitution without the other parties represented. South West Africa formally obtained independence as the Republic of Namibia on 21 March 1990.

== See also ==
- Alcora Exercise
- Angolan Civil War
- Cuban intervention in Angola
- List of operations of the South African Border War
- Namibian Czechs
- Portuguese Colonial War
- Rhodesian Bush War
- South Africa and weapons of mass destruction
