= 44 Parachute Brigade (South Africa) =

44 Parachute Brigade (SADF)
- 44 Parachute Brigade Beret Badge
- Founded: 1978
- Disbanded: 1999
- Country: South Africa
- Branch: South African Army
- Type: Air assault infantry Airborne forces
- Role: Airborne Ops; Air-Landed Assault Ops; Heli-borne Assault Ops; Ltd Amphibious deployment; Parachute School; Parachute Depot; Air Supply
- Size: Brigade
- Part of: South African Army Infantry Formation
- Anniversaries: 5 May (Paratroopers Remembrance Day)

Commanders
- 1978–1979: Brig. M.J.du Plessis (co-founder)
- 1980–1982: Col. Jan Breytenbach (co-founder)

44 Parachute Brigade was a combined forces brigade include air assault infantry and paratrooper of the South African Army. It was founded on 20 April 1978, by Colonel Jan Breytenbach, following the disbandment of 1 SA Corps and the battle of Cassinga. Upon formation, the brigade was commanded by Brigadier M. J. du Plessis, who was assigned the task of establishing by working with the Parachute Staff Officer, Colonel Jan Breytenbach. At the time du Plessis was the commanding officer of the Orange Free State Command (OFS Cmd) and had previous experience serving in 1 Parachute Battalion. Breytenbach had also been a member of 1 Parachute Battalion and had also founded the South African Special Forces Brigade and 32 Battalion. The location that was chosen for the brigade's headquarters was in the lines of the OFS Cmd Headquarters, next to the old Tempe Airfield in Bloemfontein.

The brigade's units initially consisted of two Citizen Force units, 2 and 3 Parachute Battalions, that were manned by paratroopers who had completed their initial national service in 1 Parachute Battalion. Shortly after formation, it was realised that these two battalions, being infantry units only, were not capable of providing an effective and balanced force for conventional operations. An all-arms formation with an airborne capability was needed, and as a result, later on the brigade was expanded with various arms including all-terrain vehicle (ATV), anti-aircraft, anti-tank, artillery, engineering, intelligence, maintenance and workshops, mobile field hospitals, mortars, and signals units.

The brigade remained in existence until 1999 when it was reduced in size and re-designated 44 Parachute Regiment. Prior to this, 44 Parachute Brigade undertook a number of operations in Angola during the South African Border War as well as counter insurgency operations inside South Africa.

== History ==
=== Early development of the Brigade: 1979–1980 ===
Together with the announcement of the proposed establishment of the brigade by the then Minister of Defence, P. W. Botha, in April 1978, approval was also given for the establishment of 44 Parachute Brigade, 44 Field Engineer Squadron and 44 Parachute Brigade Signal Squadron with effect from 1 January 1979. 2 and 3 Parachute Battalions were officially placed under command of 44 Parachute Brigade on 4 January 1979, and in May 1979, the brigade became self-accounting.

In 1980 the brigade moved its headquarters and constituent units to Pretoria for administrative and accommodation reasons. Colonel Breytenbach believed that the brigade should be housed closer to its air transport facilities that were centered at the Waterkloof Air Force Base in Pretoria. The brigade HQ, however, was temporarily de-activated, and the post of SSO Parachute Operations was established under Director Operations at Army HQ. Colonel Breytenbach occupied this post, and was also responsible for the continued administration of the brigade. On 24 September 1980 the Brigade HQ was re-activated with Breytenbach as un-appointed Officer Commanding and moved to the farm Haakdoringfontein at Murrayhill near Wallmansthal, some 35 kilometers north of Pretoria. This farm once belonged to Commandant General Piet Joubert of the old Zuid-Afrikaansche Republiek, and the original stone farmhouse and outbuildings have been incorporated into the Brigade Headquarters.

Murrayhill would serve as the home of 44 Parachute Brigade until the commencement of scaling down of operations and in 1991 Tempe (Bloemfontein) again became its Headquarters.

=== Formalising of 44 Parachute Brigade: 1981 ===
After moving to Murrayhill in 1980, 44 Parachute Brigade experienced relatively little organizational development even though the individual units within the brigade remained operationally active. After the battle of Cassinga in 1978, Colonel Breytenbach motivated an urgent requirement for a Pathfinder detachment that would be capable of infiltrating a Drop Zone before the main force arrived so as to be able to direct the drop from the ground, instead of relying on dead-reckoning navigation by Air Force aircrew. A Pathfinding unit, nicknamed the Philistines, was duly established, manned by a combination of ex-Rhodesian soldiers and local volunteers. 18 Light Regiment, an artillery unit equipped with 120 mm heavy mortars, was transferred to the brigade, and in 1980 a Light Artillery Battery executed a drop together with 2 Parachute Battalion on the Zimbabwean border in the then Northern Transvaal as part of an exercise called 'Crossbow'. This further illustrated the need to develop an all-arms approach to the airborne doctrine, training and organization.

In 1981, one of the key objectives of the newly appointed Chief of the South African Army, Lieutenant General J.J. Geldenhuys, SSA, SD, SM, was the formalising of 44 Parachute Brigade. Following this, on 1 January 1982, Colonel F. J. Bestbier took up the post of the first formally appointed commanding officer of 44 Parachute Brigade. Bestbier had previously commanded a mechanised infantry battalion, although he had served with 1 Parachute Battalion for 10 years prior to that. Colonel Bestbier disbanded the Philistines and those foreign soldiers in the unit completed their contracts and left the SADF.

In 1998 the decision was taken to reduce the brigade to the status of a regiment, and in 2000 this came into effect when the formation was reduced to 44 Parachute Regiment (South Africa).

=== Expansion of the brigade: 1982–1986 ===
During this period the brigade went through a real period of expansion with additional staff officers being transferred into the brigade Headquarters. With the headquarters established and staffed domestic administration of the brigade was possible. This period also saw the following developments within the Citizen Force Units:

Approval in principle for the establishment of 4 Parachute Battalion

Approval for the upgrading of the following Sub-Units to:

- 44 Anti-Aircraft Regiment
- 44 Signal Unit
- 44 Maintenance Unit.
- 37 Field Workshop (Under the brigade from 1 January 1984)

The following sub-units were also activated:

- 44 Anti-Tank Company
- 44 Pathfinder Company
- 44 Dispatcher Platoon
- 44 Provost Platoon

Full Time Units 44 Parachute Brigade

Part Time Units 44 Parachute Brigade

Colonel D. J. Moore took command of 44 Parachute Brigade on 1 January 1985 having spent 13 years at 1 Parachute Battalion serving 4 of those years as Officer Commanding.

In 1985 the brigade also produced a manual on airborne operations, in which the concept of a Parachute Battalion Group as the basic, balanced airborne assault force is set out, together with its doctrinal employment. Organizations within the brigade were accordingly amended to conform to this concept, which gave the brigade the capacity to mobilise three balanced Parachute Battalion Groups.

=== The Parachute Battalion Group concept: 1988 ===
During 1988 the Chief of the SA Army tasked 44 Parachute Brigade to maintain a full-time parachute group ready for immediate deployment. This was as a result of the changing and uncertain operational situation in Angola at the time. In order to achieve this, several National Servicemen Companies from 1 Parachute Battalion were placed under the operational command of the brigade. 2 Parachute Battalion and other elements constituted the force from the brigade side.

This combined formation was dubbed '14 Parachute Battalion Group' (The 1 referring to 1 Parachute Battalion and the 4 to 44 Parachute Brigade).

=== Air Drop Capabilities: 1982–1986 ===
During this period the brigade conducted extensive tests on developing a heavy drop capability. The tests originated at 1 Parachute Battalion in 1982 with stripped-down Land-Rovers dubbed 'Fireflies', progressing to successfully dropping light armored reconnaissance vehicles carrying potent anti-tank weapons systems.

Vehicles were dropped by means of both the Platform Extraction System, as well as the Low Altitude Parachute Extraction System. In 1986 the brigade also evaluated several proto-types and finally select an Air-droppable Utility Vehicle which was named the Jakkals (Jackal). The origin of the 'Jakkals' is said to have derived from Colonel Jackel (Technical Service Corps) who developed it.

=== Exercises and Brigade developments: 1987–1990 ===
In 1987 the brigade's first large-scale airborne exercise took place with 3 Parachute Battalion Group carrying out Exercise Iron Eagle I in the Batavia area of North West Transvaal, close to the Botswana border. 500 troops, several vehicles and heavy weapons with ammunition were dropped by day from four C130 Hercules aircraft, four C160 ZZ Transall aircraft and twelve DC-3 Dakota aircraft in one lift. Due to various factors, Exercise Iron Eagle II with 4 Parachute Battalion Group, due to take place later in the same year, had to be cancelled.

In March 1988, Exercise Iron Eagle III was carried out by 2 Parachute Battalion Group on the training grounds at Murrayhill. It involved a night drop onto a very rough Drop Zone by 600 men and 34 tonnes of equipment, including 16 vehicles.

The drop was followed by a night march of 12 kilometers and a first light assault on an objective.

In May 1988, Exercise Hornet took place in the Batavia area close to the Botswana Border. This involved a battalion-sized parachute drop followed by a helicopter deployment which was executed by 3 Parachute Battalion.

1988 also saw 101 Air Supply Company come under the command of the brigade placing the SADF's complete air supply capability under the umbrella of the brigade.

Exercise Strandloper which was a large exercise was planned and executed between July and September 1988, 14 Parachute Battalion Group began preparing for this immediately. This exercise was amphibious and was held at Walvis Bay, SWA, and it heralded the start of a new era for the brigade at the time, one in which this new role would begin to supplement the traditional airborne role.

Following this exercise 14 Parachute Battalion Group was deployed in the Operational Area during April 1989. On returning from SWA, 14 Parachute Battalion Group was a depleted unit with the Citizen Force elements within it having been demobilised.

The depleted Group prepared for and took part in an Exercise known as Sweepslag II/88 together with other conventional forces at the Army Battle School near Lohatlha in the Northern Cape. The Paratroopers travelled 500 kilometres by road from Pretoria only to discover that they would immediately have to participate in a night drop with heavy equipment. The Exercise also involved 'assaults' on several objectives and the occupation of a bridgehead.

14 Parachute Battalion Group become a permanent unit of 44 Parachute Brigade with effect from 1 January 1989, amalgamating all parachute qualified National Servicemen elements of the Army for operational deployment in their second year of full-time National Service.

In September 1989 14 Parachute Battalion group carried out a second amphibious exercise, dubbed Exercise Vlakwater, in the Saldanha Bay area. This exercise also saw a full troop with two gun sections of 14.5 mm AA Guns, One Jakkals Vehicle with a Mamba double barreled 12.7 mm AA Gun being deployed in an air drop.

The brigade was at one stage on stand-by with both 14 Parachute Battalion Group and 2 Parachute Battalion in case events leading up to the SWA/Namibian independence turned sour. In April 1989, 14 Parachute Battalion Group was deployed to the Northwestern parts of Namibia where they carried out heli-borne operations from a base at Ehomba as part of Operation Merlyn, in what became known as the Nine Day War. Appropriately, the South African paratroopers, the first to see action in the Namibian war in the 1960s, were also involved in the final military operations.

With the rationalization of the SADF commencing from the end of 1989 and both 14 Parachute Battalion Group and 4 Parachute Battalion being de-activated, the brigade again adopted a programme of training, rather than of conducting operations.

During 1990 however, Iron Eagle 90, a parachute assault exercise, was carried out at Murrayhill by 3 Parachute Battalion, while 1 Parachute Battalion conducted a heliborne assault exercise known as Exercise Pegasus.

In 1990 the first company of black paratroopers were also trained by 1 Parachute Battalion.

44 Parachute Brigade conducted its first skeleton brigade exercise in 1990, combining it with a Naval Gunfire Support exercise in the Lake St Lucia area. It was called Exercise Leviathan.

=== Setting the Strategy for 1990–1999 ===
In April 1990 a symposium, termed PARATROOPER 2000, was held between 44 Parachute Brigade and 1 Parachute Battalion and a strategy was developed for the role, training, administration and development of the parachute forces for the next decade.

== Operations ==
=== Operation Reindeer (The Battle of Cassinga) 1978 ===
The brigade had barely commenced organizing when less than a month later, on 4 May 1978, the operational situation required the execution of South Africa's first large-scale airborne assault, Operation Reindeer. Prior to this, parachute operations by 1 Parachute Battalion had been rare, consisting mostly of platoon, or sometimes company size. This time the operation called for an assault on a SWAPO base and refugee camp 250 kilometers inside Angola by 367 paratroopers.

The brigade mobilised companies from 2 and 3 Parachute Battalions. These were supplemented by mortar, anti-tank elements as well as a rifle platoon from 1 Parachute Battalion. The composite force of a battalion minus, Commanded by Col Breytenbach carried out the first-light parachute assault on a SWAPO base code-name "Moscow", at Cassinga in Angola. The force was closely supported throughout by the South African Air Force, and inflicted heavy losses on enemy, with only four paratroopers being lost in the action during the operation.

An orderly extraction of the remaining half of the paratroopers went awry with the appearance and counterattack by a Cuban armored column. With the planned landing zones under fire, the paratroopers were forced to execute a 'hot extraction' by helicopter troopships. The initiative and perseverance of the leadership resulted in a successful extraction, minimizing of loss and the objective being achieved.

An analysis of the operation revealed certain deficiencies and shortcomings, namely the need to deploy a pathfinder unit to ensure that drop zones were marked and measured accurately, that the aerial photography was properly analyzed and that the principle of "Unity of Command" be adhered to. The importance of forming a parachute brigade had also been clearly demonstrated.

This event is remembered in Namibia as the Cassinga massacre, the subject of much continued controversy covered in part during the Truth and reconciliation commission in South Africa. It has emerged that the village was used as a defended refugee camp at the time and that during the assault 159 men, of whom 12 were soldiers, 167 women (number of those designated 'soldiers' not specified), and 298 teenagers and children.

=== Operations on the increase: 1979–1982 ===
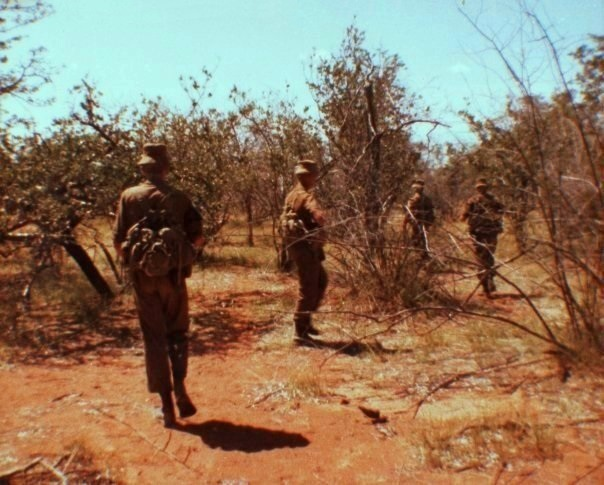
Operational Area 1982

During the early eighties 1 Parachute Battalion had grown in size to the extent that it had eight full-time rifle companies on strength. A permanent Paratrooper Base had been established alongside the Ondangwa Airfield in Owambo, Northern South West Africa, and a company was always on strength and deployed there. At times Citizen Force Parachute Companies would relieve the 1 Parachute Battalion Company for the purposes of rotation and furlough but usually it was a company from 1 Parachute Battalion stationed there.

The force at Ondangwa were used mainly for reaction tasks and internal Fireforce (Note: A manoeuvre involving troops being deployed by helicopter and or parachute drops in the area immediately after an insurgent presence had been reported or sighted) operations. Sometimes paratroopers would be dropped into contacts up to 3 times per day. During 1979 companies from 1 Parachute Battalion, as a part of Operation Bowler, achieved remarkably high success rates with Fireforce actions.

Other paratrooper companies were also from time to time deployed further south, in the farmlands, tracking and destroying insurgents who had penetrated that far. The numbers of insurgents caught or killed by the paratroopers was steadily increasing.

May 1980 saw the launch of another major offensive by the SADF into Angola, this was known as Operation Sceptic. During this Operation six companies from 1 Parachute Battalion were simultaneously deployed as ordinary infantry and later that year a company from 1 Parachute Battalion executed a successful heliborne assault on a SWAPO / MPLA headquarters at Chitado in Angola. The latter operation was known as Operation Klipklop.

During Operation Protea, Operation Carnation and Operation Askari 1 Parachute Battalion again deployed their companies as normal infantry and was noted as being instrumental in originating joint operations with the police. This would serve as the model on which the 'Koevoet' Police Unit was established.

A pathfinder company of the brigade were deployed primarily doing ground reconnaissance and composed mainly of foreign soldiers, serving a one-year contract, who had seen service in the Rhodesian Army airborne units which had since been disbanded when the government of the new state of Zimbabwe had taken office.

An operational night drop within Angola also took place as part of Operation Daisy in 1981 by several companies from 3 Parachute Battalion.

For paratroopers the 1980s were characterised by continual operational involvement in Angola. Citizen Force Companies from 2 and 3 Parachute Battalion were initially also involved, often in heavy fighting as at Evale in Angola in 1981. A helicopter operation involving a 2 Parachute Battalion company together with a company of "Bushmen" (khoisan trackers) resulted in the death of one paratrooper and the wounding of several others.

1 Parachute Battalion also continued to reinforce mechanised and motorised battle groups during operations into Angola with the support of its paratroopers, often using heliborne tactics. In 1982 the unit experienced a major setback when a Puma Helicopter was shot down during Operation Meebos by enemy anti-aircraft fire and 12 paratroopers perished.

During 1984 to 1986 when Citizen Force units of 44 Parachute Brigade were called up and became increasingly embroiled in the internal unrest situation in South Africa, 1 Parachute Battalion remained virtually the only parachute unit to carry on with operations in South West Africa and Angola. The refinement of the old "Fireforce" technique into the night-time Lunar Operations saw curfews being enforced as a result of night time parachute drops during this period.

At the end of 1980 the force was scaled down and 14 Para Battalion Group and 4 Para Battalion were disbanded.

=== Urban and Rural COINOPS: 1984–1991 ===
The period 1984 to 1986 saw intense internal unrest within South Africa and most elements of the brigade as well as the companies of 1 Parachute Battalion were called up to do urban Counter Insurgency Operations (COINOPS).

Unrest in Townships in the Western Cape, Eastern Cape, Witwatersrand and Pretoria saw Infantry Companies of 44 Parachute Brigade, and later complete battalions being used to assist with the maintenance of law and order. These operations were dubbed Poncho and Zenon.

The gunners of 18 Light Regiment on the other hand found themselves deployed as an infantry battalion to prevent unrest within the homeland of Kwa Ndebele, in an Operation dubbed Windmeul.

This period even saw a battalion of technical, maintenance, signals and other supporting elements of the brigade being deployed in Soweto as part of an Operation dubbed Xenon.

The brigade's operational focus again shifted back to rural COINOPS in 1986 and members of the brigade were deployed along the borders of Zimbabwe and Botswana in an Operation known as Operation Pebble. Battalions who were called up during this period were called up for 60 days at a time for border protection duties.

In 1990 however 1 Parachute Battalion again saw further participation in numerous operational deployments to stabilise internal unrest situations in the country.

In January 1991, 2 Parachute Battalion carried out the first operational jump in an urban COINOPS role during a 60-day deployment insurgency role. They conducted a subsequent sweep through a built-up area as part of an Operation called Eardrum.

In May 1991, 3 Parachute Battalion mobilised with a Battalion HQ and two companies within 72 hours to deploy for 30 days in Soweto on urban COINOPS. During this time several operational parachute drops were executed in the urban areas, as part of cordon and search operations.

=== Climax to the War in Angola: 1987–1988 ===
31 October 1987, D company from 1 Parachute Battalion formed part of a battle Group (101 Battalion and 2 recce) in an operation called Operation Firewood. The fighting took place at Indungo, Swapo Eastern Area HQ. ( MK was not present at the battle as previously stated on this page )

1987 also was the year when the very last operational parachute drop was executed in Angola as a part of Operation Pineapple, where two companies from 1 Parachute Battalion performed a cordon and sweep maneuvers.

Finally, 1987 and 1988 saw the climax of the war in Angola with the battles taking place at Cuito Cuanavale and the Lomba River. Here Pathfinders from 1 Parachute Battalion were heavily deployed in the action and during Operation Moduler, Operation Hooper and Operation Packer they assisted liaison teams working between UNITA and the mechanised SADF forces by conducting reconnaissance missions within enemy-held territory in 1987. A battery from 18 Light Regiment was also deployed in January 1988 to take part in Operation Hooper which included heavy fighting against Cuban and Forças Armadas Populares de Libertação de Angola or People's Armed Forces for Liberation of Angola (FAPLA).

=== The end in South West Africa: 1989 ===
Colonel McGill Alexander took command of the brigade on 1 April 1989. He had already been Acting Brigade Commander in his previous post as SO1 for several months prior to this performing detached duties with the Joint Military Monitoring Commission on the Angolan / SWA Border. He had also served with 1 Parachute Battalion, 2 Parachute Battalion and 44 Parachute Brigade Headquarters amongst other postings.

Shortly after assuming command of the brigade he was tasked with mobilizing 14 Parachute Battalion Group (Note: 14 Parachute Group is described elsewhere under the heading "The Parachute Battalion Group Concept") to assist warding off a final infiltration by SWAPO insurgents into northern SWA. The Battalion Group deployed with all its personnel and equipment in an air-landed operation within 14 hours of being told to deploy. The operation, called Operation Merlyn, involved spending several weeks hunting insurgents, chiefly in the mountains of the Kaokoveld. As a result of this effort some 20 insurgents were killed during the operation.

== Insignia ==
=== Insignia SADF ===
SADF Nutria Badges worn on Combat Uniform known as Browns, whilst the Metal insignia were worn on the Dress Uniform known as Step-Outs.

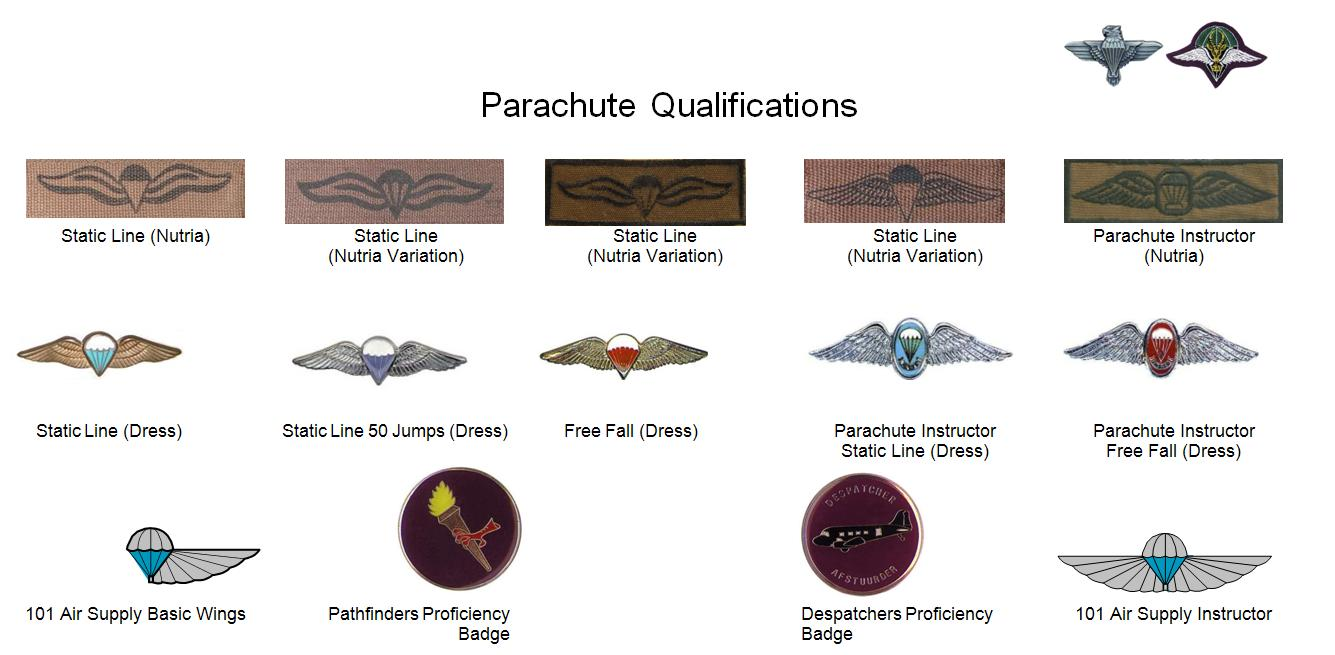

=== Insignia SANDF ===
New badges were introduced 1996 for wearing on the camouflage combat dress. These are black embossed plastic on a thatch green background.

Paratrooper Basic (Qualification) Basic, Static Line. Black on Thatch beige, Embossed. Small Black wings	Paratrooper Dispatcher (Qualification) Dispatcher, Static Line. Black on Thatch beige, Embossed. Small Black wings	Free Fall Paratrooper (Qualification) Advanced, Freefall. Black on Thatch beige. Small Black wings

Freefall Instructor (Qualification) Instructor, Freefall Qualified. Black on Thatch beige, Embossed. Large Black wings	Paratrooper Instructor (Qualification) Instructor, Static Line. Black on Thatch beige, Embossed. Large Black wings	Pathfinder Badge (Qualification) Black on Thatch beige, Embossed.

Air Supply (Qualification) Half Wing. Black on Thatch beige, Embossed. Half wing	Air Supply Instructor (Qualification) Full Wing. Black on Thatch beige, Embossed. Full Wing	Air Assault (Qualification) Black on Thatch beige, Embossed. Small Helicopter with wings

== Weaponry ==
Weapons used by Paratroopers of the Brigade
FN FAL rifle (1978–1979) (Designated R1)	R4 and R5 Assault rifle (1980–Present)	FN MAG (Image FN Herstal)
M79 Grenade Launcher (Prior to 1985)	Milkor MGL (Multiple Grenade Launcher)	Rocket-propelled grenade (RPG-7)
Commando 60mm Mortar (Airborne Infantry) (60mm Patmor)	Jakkals Utility Vehicle ready for airdrop	Gecko 8x8 ATV during a mock battle at AFB Waterkloof
	120mm Mortar (Airborne Artillery)	

As an Airborne Brigade with various Sub-Units its support Weaponry also consisted of 81mm Mortar (Infantry) and various other standard and non-standard firearms.

== Leadership ==
44 Parachute Battalion Leadership
From	Officers Commanding	To	Ribbon
20 April 1978	Col M. J. du Plessis SD,SM,MMM,SAStC (Note: Later Brigadier)	31 December 1979	Southern Cross Decoration SD Southern Cross Medal SM Military Merit Medal MMM South African Staff Corps SAStC
24 September 1980	Col J. D. Breytenbach DVR,SD,SM,MMM,SAStC	31 December 1982	Van Riebeeck Decoration DVR Southern Cross Decoration SD Southern Cross Medal SM Military Merit Medal MMM South African Staff Corps SAStC
1 January 1982	Col F. J. Bestbier SD,MMM,SAStC	31 December 1984	Southern Cross Decoration SD Military Merit Medal MMM South African Staff Corps SAStC
1 January 1985	Col D. J. Moore MMM,SAStC	31 March 1989	Military Merit Medal MMM South African Staff Corps SAStC
1 April 1989	Col McGill Alexander SM,MMM,ORB,SAStC (Note: Later Brigadier General)	31 January 1992	Southern Cross Medal SM Military Merit Medal MMM Order of the Cloud and Banner ORB South African Staff Corps SAStC
1 February 1992	Col L. Rudman PVD,SD,SM,MMM,LOM,SAStC (Note: Later Major General) (Note: Later Deputy Chief of the South African Army)	1994	Pro Virtute Decoration PVD Southern Cross Decoration SD Southern Cross Medal SM Military Merit Medal MMM Legion of Merit LOM South African Staff Corps SAStC
c. 1994	Col G. P. Nel MMM,SAStC	c. 1996	Military Merit Medal MMM South African Staff Corps SAStC
1 January 1997	Col J. H. van der Walt MMM,SAStC	nd	Military Merit Medal MMM South African Staff Corps SAStC
nd	Col B. P. Foke SAStC	nd	South African Staff Corps SAStC
nd	Cmdt John Brooks	nd	
From	Brigade Sergeants Major	To	Ribbon
1 January 1980	WO1 J.H. Möller MMM	31 December 1982	Military Merit Medal MMM
1 January 1983	WO1 G.J. Kitching MMM	31 December 1985	Military Merit Medal MMM
1 January 1986	WO1 Joubert PMM,MMM	31 December 1991	Pro Merito Medal PMM Military Merit Medal MMM
1 January 1992	WO1 S.S. Baard PMM,MMM	31 December 1992	Pro Merito Medal PMM Military Merit Medal MMM
1 January 1993	WO1 J.C. Landman PMM,MMM	30 June 1997	Pro Merito Medal PMM Military Merit Medal MMM
1 July 1997	WO1 S.S. Baard PMM,MMM	31 August 1998	Pro Merito Medal PMM Military Merit Medal MMM
1 September 1998	WO1 Rendel PMM	nd	Pro Merito Medal PMM

44 Parachute Battalion:Brigade HQ Unit Leadership
From	Officers Commanding	To	Ribbon
1 January 1983	Cmdt W. Dalton	31 December 1984	
1 January 1985	Cmdt R Mathews	31 December 1987	
1 January 1988	Cmdt V. Hattingh	31 December 1989	
1990	Cmdt G.I. Janse van Rensburg	1991	
1991	Cmdt J.W. Lerm	1993	
1994	Cmdt G.R. van Rooyen	1996	
1997	Cmdt B.P. Foke	nd	
From	Regimental Sergeants Major	To	Ribbon
1986	WO1 P.W. van Heerden	1987	
1988	WO1 J. Hart	1989	
1990	WO1 G. van Rooyen	1991	
1992	WO1 S.S. Baard	1993	
1993	WO1 A.R. Grebe	1996	
1997	WO1 M.A. Helberg	nd	

== Units ==
Up until December 1989, 44 Parachute Brigade consisted of many different units. Herewith a breakdown of these, their composition, exercises, operations as well as command structure.

=== Infantry ===
1 Parachute Battalion is the only full-time paratroop unit of the South African Army. It was established on 1 April 1961 by the redesignation of 2 Mobile Watch South African Engineer Corps. The unit's nickname "Parabat" is a portmanteau derived from the words "Parachute Battalion".

In 1960 fifteen volunteers from the SADF were sent to England, the majority to train as parachute instructors, some as parachute-packers and one SAAF pilot in the dropping of paratroopers. These formed the nucleus of 1 Parachute Battalion at Tempe in Bloemfontein. The first paratroopers were Permanent Force men, but soon the training of Citizen Force (similar to the National Guard of the United States) paratroopers commenced. Members of 1 Parachute Battalion were the first S.A. Army men to see action after World War II when, in 1966, they participated, with the South African Police, against insurgents in S.W.A. (now Namibia).

In 1966, members of 1 Parachute Battalion participated in the first action in the war in South West Africa during a heliborne assault on an insurgent base. Thereafter, Parabats were involved in operations in SWA/Namibia, Angola, Zambia, Mozambique and Rhodesia (now Zimbabwe) and elsewhere on an almost constant basis for over 20 years.

1 Parachute Bn. was organised as follows: Permanent Force – Batt. H.Q., H.Q. Coy and A and B Coy's; Citizen Force: C Coy Cape Town, D Coy Durban, E Coy Pretoria and F Coy Johannesburg. Two further battalions were formed in the 1970s: 2 Parachute Battalion in 1972 and 3 Parachute Battalion in 1977.

In 1974 and 1975 1 Parachute Bn. operated along the Angolan border with South West Africa (SWA); along the Caprivi Strip; a platoon jumped near Luiana, Angola to relieve a group of "Bushmen" trapped by a SWAPO force; and in Operation Savannah during the Angolan Civil War of 1974–1975 when two companies of 1 Parachute Battalion were dropped on the northern border of SWA at Ruacana and Santa Clara in Angola to relieve two Portuguese communities trapped by the MPLA.

McGill Alexander writes that companies from 1,2, and 3 Parachute Battalions operated against Zimbabwean guerrillas inside Rhodesia in September 1979-FEbruary 1980, the last years of the Rhodesian Bush War.

With the coming of 44 Parachute Brigade in April 1978, under the leadership of Brig. M J du Plessis as Officer Commanding, it became a powerful force. The first large airborne exercise of the Parachute Battalion Group took place in 1987 in the North Western Transvaal (now North West Province). With the eventual disbanding of 44 Parachute Brigade its full-time personnel were moved to Bloemfontein and incorporated into the 1 Parachute Battalion Group.

In 1986, the unit embarked on its first High altitude Low Opening/High Altitude High Opening (HALO/HAHO) course in Bloemfontein. This would enable the troops to drop into enemy territory from aircraft following commercial routes.

=== 44 Pathfinders ===
In 1976, 1 Parachute Battalion possessed a limited pathfinder capability in a small group of permanent force members who were Drop Zone Safety Officers and Freefall qualified. With fixed posts within the battalion, these members only grouped as and when the situation required and then mainly for the purpose of training.

With the lessons learnt from Operation Reindeer in May 1978, it became clear that a method for ensuring correct and safe dropping, grouping and extraction of paratroopers was urgently needed. In order to have the capability to covertly insert behind enemy lines, and do reconnaissance on the target, the battalion would need to create a formal structure, command system, specialised equipment and operational procedures to support this.

A process was begun to formulate staffing, equipment tables and to establish guidelines for the formation of an extended pathfinder capability within the unit. The blueprint used was a combination of the procedures used by the British SAS, U.S. Pathfinders and the Reconnaissance Regiments of the SADF. The objective was to train the Pathfinder to be on par with the Recces in their training schedule regarding land warfare, but specializing in pathfinder and airborne operations. The first group of pathfinders started training in September 1978.

=== 44 Anti-Tank Company ===
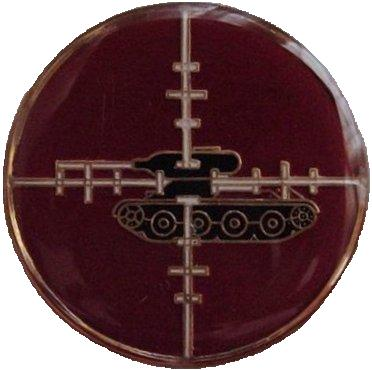
44 Anti-Tank Company

==== Leadership ====
Anti-Tank Company Leadership
From	Officers Commanding	To	Ribbon
1 January 1985	Lt S.J. Pienaar	3 March 1986	
1 April 1986	Capt Du P. Lombaard	31 December 1989	
1 January 1990	Capt N.Q.E. Smart	n.d.	

=== Artillery ===
18 Light Regiment is claimed to be "The only Airborne Artillery Regiment in Africa". In contrast to most South African artillery units was one of the more "modern" artillery regiment that was created to cope with modern warfare requirements.

The need for a light artillery regiment that could support paratroopers during air assault operations was identified in the early 1970s; however, the regiment was officially established only in January 1977. Located with its headquarters in Randburg, Transvaal it was then still part of 1 SA Corps. Its name was allocated by General N. van den Berg. On 25 May 1981 Colonel Jan Breytenbach, the officer commanding of 44 Parachute Brigade, visited the regiment and the future airborne strategy and role of 18 Light Regiment was spelled out as support to the newly formed 44 Parachute Brigade with artillery firepower during airborne operations, or any other operations of the brigade. In June 1982 the regiment was incorporated into the newly formed 44 Parachute Brigade and its new base, Murray Hill. Attempts were made at the time by the brigade to change the regiment's name to 44 Light Regiment, but this idea did not meet the approval of the then Chief of Army.

18 Light Regiment was structured slightly different from the other conventional medium artillery regiments. The regiment consisted of a small RHQ element and 3 batteries, namely 181, 182 and 183 Battery. Each battery consisted of two troops, each with four 120 mm mortars. Each mortar detachment consisted of five gunners. The 120 mm mortars of the regiment gave it an ideal airborne capacity. The regiment could now be deployed as a true light artillery regiment.

In order to fulfill the airborne objective, the personnel were required to qualify as paratroopers. The existing officers and men of the unit who were not yet qualified took this as a challenge, and in March 1982 the leader element was sent to 1 Parachute Regiment in Bloemfontein for parachute training. The Regiments traditional blue artillery berets were now exchanged for the paratroopers' maroon berets.

=== Engineering ===
==== 44 Field Engineer Squadron (20 April 1978 – 11 January 1990) ====
44 Parachute Engineer Regiment
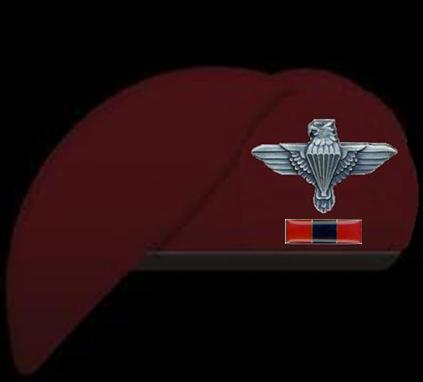
- Active: 20 April 1978 to present
- Country: South Africa
- Branch: South African Army; South African Army
- Type: Airborne combat engineer
- Role: Air assault Bomb disposal Close-quarters battle Demolition; Engineer reconnaissance Military engineering Parachuting; Route clearance (IEDs)
- Size: Squadron
- Part of: South African Infantry Corps; Army Conventional Reserve

The unit was inaugurated in April 1978 as part of the formation of 44 Parachute Brigade. Initially a squadron, it started out from scratch without any office facilities or an official commanding officer.

It got its first leadership when in 1982, a then 2nd Lieutenant Gerhard Pretorius was appointed as first adjutant and later on as first officer commanding of the squadron.

He commenced with the construction of offices and the unit began organizing itself. On the first call out of this unit for training the unit comprised three 2nd lieutenants and thirty other ranks. The most senior non-commissioned officer at the time was a corporal. The unit underwent its first training at the hands of instructions from Special Forces in demolitions, mine warfare and infantry training. The emphasis of this training being to transform the engineers from a support role to that of an attack role adding the versatility providing own defense during operations.

In this way the Para-Sapper offers engineering support where required and the ability to deliver enhanced firepower.

As a reserve unit, it has a status roughly equivalent to that of a British Army Reserve or United States Army National Guard unit.

===== Operations =====
Operation "Reindeer"

The 1st Para-Sappers that ever took part in a SADF airborne assault operation were during Operation Reindeer at Cassinga on 4 May 1978. Both were two Lieutenants from the regular force.

Operation "Jabber"

In 1986 the unit served and distinguished itself as a part of 54 Battalion, in Sector 10 as well as in Angola taking part in Operation Jabber. It operated independently during the 3-month stint as a mine hunting unit as well as lifting caches, sometimes going on long range mine hunting missions without traditional infantry protection. A contact was recorded between the Para Sappers and SWAPO during such a long range mission where their retaliatory mortar fire caused the enemy to flee.

As a result of the units efforts, record mines and caches were lifted, more than any before and earned it the commendation (Floating Trophy) of Best Reserve Force Unit for 1986 within 44 Parachute Brigade.

With the unit having distinguished itself the concept of upgrading it to a conventional engineer regiment was motivated by the commanding officer together with the assistance of the Brigade HQ, who embarked up long negotiations and proposals to the Director of Engineers of the S.A. Army who finally accepted. The process of approval and upgrading however was long and protracted with this only realizing many years after.

Members of 44 Engineering Regiment also took part in several other operations:

- Operation Boulder − 1979/80
- Operation Protea, Operation Mispel & Operation Daisy – 1981
- Operation Smokeshell – 1980
- Operation Fakkel, Operation Meebos, Operation Snoek and Operation Gepetto – 1982/83
- Operation Super & Operation Askari – 1983/84
- Operation Moduler, Operation Hooper and Operation Packer −1987/88

===== Exercises =====
The squadron took active participation in the following major exercises :

Iron Eagle 1 (1987), Iron Eagle 3 (1988), Strandloper (1988) and Vlakwater (1989).

==== 44 Parachute Engineer Regiment (12 January 1990 – August 2019) ====
The unit finally upgraded to an engineer regiment on 12 January 1990 and through its structure continued to provide ongoing parachute engineering support to 44 Parachute Brigade for Airborne, air-landed, heliborne and/or amphibious operations.

The role of this regiment became more prominent with the changing South African situation with it forming an integral part of Airborne Forces and it positioned to provide parachute engineering support in many scenarios from counter-insurgency to international specialist military assistance if necessary.

As with the brigade and many units within it, the rationalization process of the South African Army after 1994 saw 44 Parachute Regiment being placed under the command and control of the SA Army Engineer Formation with effect from 1 April 1999.

==== Ukhosi Parachute Engineer Regiment (August 2019 – present) ====
In August 2019, 52 Reserve Force units had their names changed to reflect the diverse military history of South Africa. 44 Parachute Engineer Regiment became the Ukhosi Parachute Engineer Regiment, and have 3 years to design and implement new regimental insignia.

===== Leadership =====
44 Parachute Engineer Regiment Leadership
From	Officers Commanding	To	Ribbon
1982	Lt Col J. G. L. Pretorius	1991	
1991	Lt Col K. F. van Heerden	2005	
2005	Lt Col J. G. Benadé	present	
From	Second in Command	To	Ribbon
1987	Capt J Rabie	1987	
1988	Maj K.F. van Heerden	1991	
1992	Capt G.L. Browne	1994	
1994	Capt P. de V. Van Zyl	1994	
1995	Capt J W Joubert	1996	
1997	Lt Col P. Kuiper	1999	
2000	Maj H. R. du Plessis	2006	
From	Regimental SergeantS Major	To	Ribbon
1987	WO2 L M Lindeque	1989	
1989	WO1 A.L.J. van Vuuren	present	

=== Workshop and Maintenance ===
101 Air Supply Unit SAOSC was the brigade's South African Ordnance Services Corps support unit.

37 Field Workshop / 44 Maintenance Unit
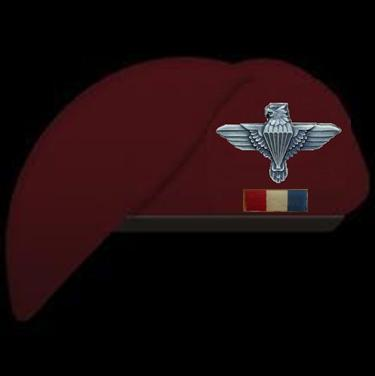
- Active: 1 April 1974 – present
- Country: South Africa
- Type: Airborne engineering maintenance and workshop
- Role: Air assault Calibration; Close-quarters battle Complex service and repair Maintenance, repair, and overhaul Military supply-chain management Mobile support teams Parachuting; Re-manufacture; Workshop management
- Part of: South African Ordnance Services Corps

==== 37 Field Workshop ====
37 Field Workshop was established 1 April 1974 in Windhoek, South West Africa as a Citizen Force second-line workshop under control of the then SWA Command.

On 19 January 1976, the unit was transferred without any personnel to Pretoria as a second-line workshop under the command of 1 SA Corps. The unit was originally established as a Technical Citizen force Unit in the SWA command. The unit first began to play an active role when it was under the command of 1 SA Corps. Under the command of SA Corps, the unit completed several tours of duties in the operational field and also in conjunction with 2 Parachute Battalion.

1 SA Corps was de-activated on 30 January 1977 and all Citizen Force Units were re-allocated. The unit has been under the command of Northern Transvaal Command since 1 February 1977 in its previous format which includes to the present day Far North and Eastern Transvaal.

With the establishment of Far North Command, Eastern Transvaal Command and the activation of 44 Parachute Brigade, the unit was placed under the command of 44 Parachute Brigade, from 16 January 1984. The unit is the only technical services unit of 44 Parachute Brigade. It is also the only Parachute technical services unit in the SADF. Since its inception the unit has done technical repair tasks under command of various Headquarters.

==== Sekhukhune Field Workshop (August 2019 – present) ====
In August 2019, 52 Reserve Force units had their names changed to reflect the diverse military history of South Africa. 37 Field Workshop became the Sekhukhune Field Workshop, and have 3 years to design and implement new regimental insignia.

==== Participation in Operations ====
- Protea
- Operation Geppetto
- Operation Daffodil
- Daisy
- Packer
- Firewood
- Hooper
- Modular
- Windmill
- Operation Pebble (During Operation Pebble unit members were also used in an Infantry capacity)

==== Command Structure of 37 Field Workshop ====
===== Commanding Officer =====
Commander	Period
Cmdt P.M de Beer	1 Jan 1979 – Information Outstanding

==== Command Structure of 44 Maintenance Unit ====
===== Commanding Officer =====
Commander	Period
Maj N. Richie-Robinson	15 Oct 1984 – 30 Apr 1986
Maj E. Crots	1 May 1986 – 5 Feb 1991
Cmdt H Frits	6 Feb 1991 – Information Outstanding

=== Signals ===
44 Signals Squadron
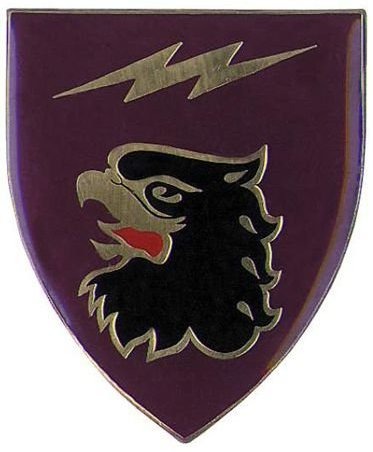
- Active: April 1978 – Present
- Country: South Africa
- Type: Airborne signal corps
- Role: Air assault Close-quarters battle Military communications Parachuting; SIGINT
- Size: Squadron

==== 44 Signal Squadron ====
In April 1978 the Minister of Defence, Mr P.W. Botha, authorised the forming of 44 Signal Squadron. During the time of 24 September 1980 until October 1986, it supported the brigade in all aspects of signals; e.g., the supply of communication and the manning of a Communication Centrum (Comcen).

On 2 October 1986 the signal unit was formed with Commandant Mauritz Lombard as commander and his task was to supply the brigade with communication and to establish a full-strength signal unit. His second in command was Maj P. Drotsky and the RSM P. Snyders.

The signal unit flag was authorised in 1986.

In May 1989 the newly promoted Commandant Drotsky took over the command of the unit and Captain Hein von Berg became his 2IC.

During 1990 it was decided to move the brigade to Bloemfontein and this move took part during 1991. Some of the brigade units were moved to Pretoria City, and the signal unit moved into the Paulhof building, in Minnaar Street, on 29 November 1991.

During 1991 WO1 J.J. van Aswegen became the RSM of the unit.

===== Command structure of 44 Signals Unit =====
====== Commanding officer ======
Commander	Period
Cmdt M. Lombard	1 Aug 1984 – 31 Mar 1989
Cmdt P. Drotsky	1 Apr 1989 – Information Outstanding

====== Regimental sergeant major ======
RSM	Period
WO1 J.J. van Aswegen	1991 – Information Outstanding

=== Medical services ===
44 Medical Task Group is a satellite unit of 7 Medical Battalion Group (7 Med Bn Gp), of platoon size.

=== Anti-aircraft ===
44 Anti-Aircraft Regiment
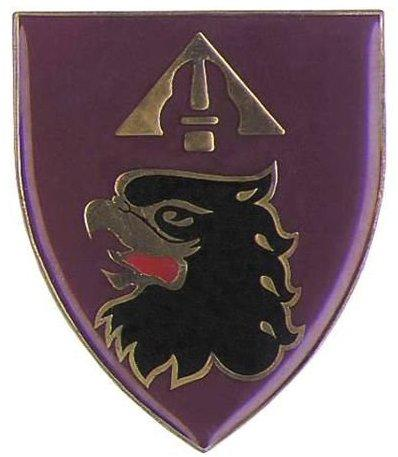
- Country: South Africa
- Branch: South African Army
- Type: Airborne anti-aircraft unit
- Role: Air assault Anti-aircraft warfare Close-quarters battle Parachuting
- Size: Regiment

==== Command structure of 44 Anti-Aircraft Regiment ====
===== Commanding officer =====
Commander	Period
Maj P. Case	1 Jan 1986 – 31 Dec 1988
Capt J. Roux	1 Jan 1989 – 31 Mar 1990
Maj J. Lourens	1 Apr 1991 – 31 Dec 1991
Capt G. Krenzer	1 Feb 1991 – Information Outstanding

== Notes ==
In 1981 the first and only ever 8 man contingent of National Servicemen from Panzer Skool completed the 81/3 course as 'engineers', called 'black bats' by their Armoured unit because of the black berets that they wore vs the para maroon berets.
