= 1 South African Infantry Battalion =

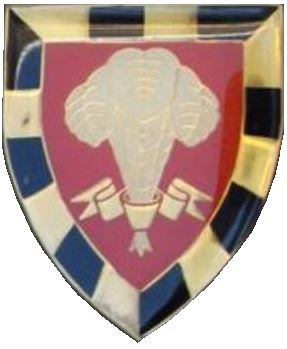
- 1 SAI emblem
- Founded: 26 January 1951; 75 years ago
- Country: South Africa
- Branch: South African Army
- Type: Infantry
- Role: Mechanised infantry
- Size: Battalion
- Part of: South African Infantry Formation
- Garrison/HQ: Tempe, Bloemfontein
- Motto: Sevire parati
- Equipment: Ratel
- Engagements: South African Border War; Operation Reindeer; Operation Sceptic; Operation Protea; Operation Daisy; Operation Askari; Operation Hooper; Operation Moduler

Insignia
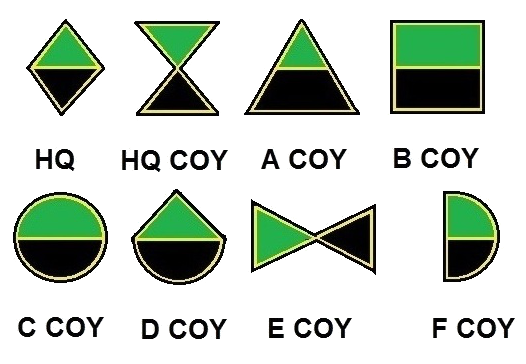
- Company level Insignia

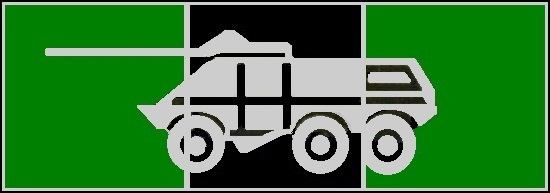
- SA Mechanised Infantry beret bar c. 1992

1 South African Infantry Battalion is a mechanised infantry battalion of the South African Army, based at Tempe near Bloemfontein. Established in 1951 and later converted to mechanised infantry with the Ratel, the unit fought in the South African Border War and remains a regular battalion of the South African Infantry Formation. Under the draft South African Army Vision 2020 force design it was charted as the mechanised infantry element of the Armoured Brigade within the Mechanised Division.

== History ==
=== Origin ===
With its establishment as 1 SA Infantry Training Battalion at Oudtshoorn on 26 January 1951, the unit became part of the infantry corps.

In 1953, the unit consisted of:

- a headquarters with companies at:
  - 1 SAI itself in Oudsthoorn as A Company,
  - 1 SSB in Bloemfontein as B Company;
  - 4 Field Regiment in Potchefstroom as C Company;

and

  - a supply & transport company, an attempt at all arms training.

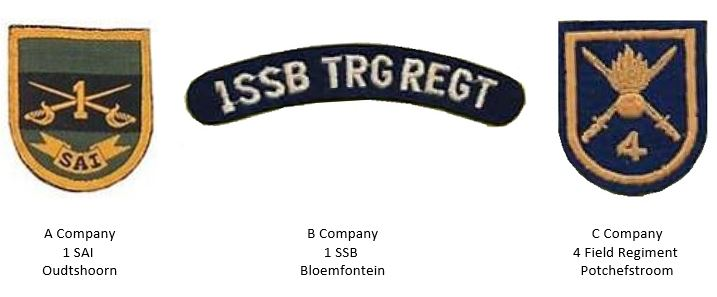
UDF era 1 SAI companies c. 1950s

The unit was reconstituted as 1 SA Infantry Battalion in November 1967 and moved to its current base at Tempe near Bloemfontein, in November 1973.

=== Mechanised infantry ===
By 1976, infantry operations had transformed drastically when the Ratel Infantry Fighting Vehicle (IFV) was introduced, with the first Ratel course presented by then Major Roland de Vries in November at 1 SAI.

In 1977, 1 SAI received its first consignment of 42 Ratel IFVs, along with a redesigned shoulder flash, depicting a wild honey badger.

For the next four years, mechanised infantry leadership students shared the same lines as 1 SAI's conventional companies, but were required to wear a nutria brassard on the right arm with a green and yellow embroidered honey badger insignia in order to stand out and ensure Espirit de Corps. The training wing, identified as the T&D Wing, was where all students attended the same course until the Section Leaders Phase had been completed, where they were then awarded their Lance Corporal stripes and then placed with regular rifle companies. The rest of the future NCOs also received their stripes and future Officers received their white Candidate Officer's tabs. These students were then evaluated and split into the Mechanised Platoon Commanders Course and Specialist Instructors Course. These platoon commanders were destined to either become future leaders of 1 SAIs rifle companies or instructors at the Training Wing, while the Specialist Instructors would become Officers and NCOs responsible for training Ratel gunners and drivers. The Platoon NCOs were responsible for the support of the vehicles, platoon weapons and signal equipment of a specific platoon. Platoon sergeants were responsible for the training and discipline of an allocated platoon.

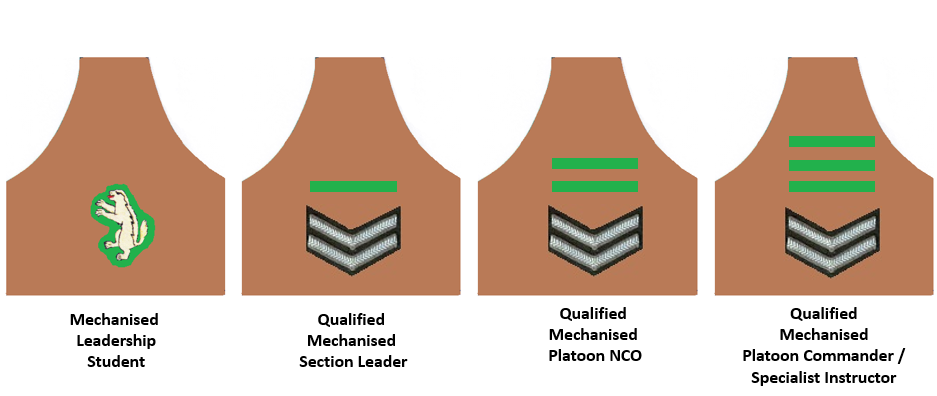
SADF era 1 SAI Mechanised Leader Brassards, 1980s

By January 1981, the training wing had been renamed to the Mechanised Leadership Wing and moved to the Akkedisdorp premises outside the lines of 1 SAI and next to 1 SSB. The distinctive honey badger student brassard was discontinued during this period.

The mechanised techniques developed at 1 SAI was transferred to two additional mechanised infantry battalions under development at that time, namely 4 SAI and 8 SAI.

=== Battalion Pioneer Platoon ===
1 SAI also had an assault pioneer capability in the 1980s, usually designated Oscar Company. Assault pioneers were the integral combat engineering component of the battalion. Assault pioneers were trained in tasks such as:

- Field defences and obstacles
- Mine detection and removal
- Primary demolitions
- Non standard bridging
- Anchorages and suspension traverses

The Pioneer Platoon provided small tasks and close support capabilities to the battalion ensuring immediacy of response and decreasing the workload of the engineer squadrons. By the 1990s this function was retired to the Engineering Corps however.

=== Border War ===
==== Operations ====
By 1978, 1 SAI took part in Operation Reindeer. 1 SAI was also later involved in:

- Sceptic,
- Protea,
- Daisy,
- Askari
- Moduler and
- Operation Hooper.

===== Honouris Crux recipients =====
The following 1 SAI members were awarded the Honoris Crux decoration

Operation Sceptic;

- Lt. J.J. du Toit
- LCpl A.T. Rutherford

Operation Protea;

- Cpl A.D. Burgers

==== Relationship with 61 Mech ====
1 SAI was also the main feeder unit for mechanised infantry companies for 61 Mechanised Battalion Group during this period.

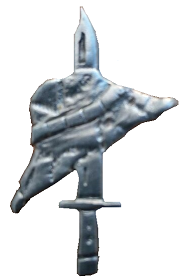
SADF Operation Hooper participation bar

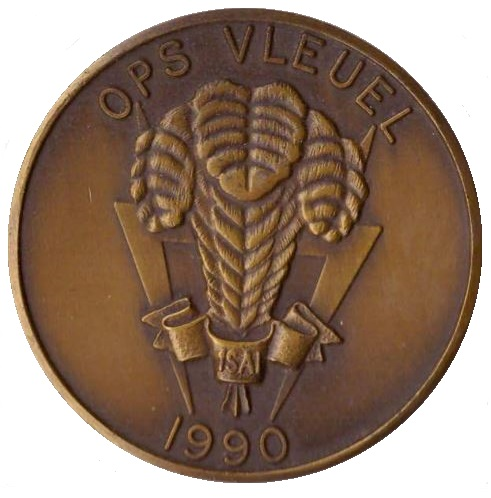
1 SAI commemorative coin Ops Vleuel

=== Freedom of the city ===
1 SAI received the freedom of entry to Bloemfontein in 1981.

=== Post-1994 ===
==== Assimilation of 151 Battalion ====
Peled writes that after January 1993, 151 Battalion, formed from the Southern Sothos in the Orange Free area, was assimilated into 1 SAI.

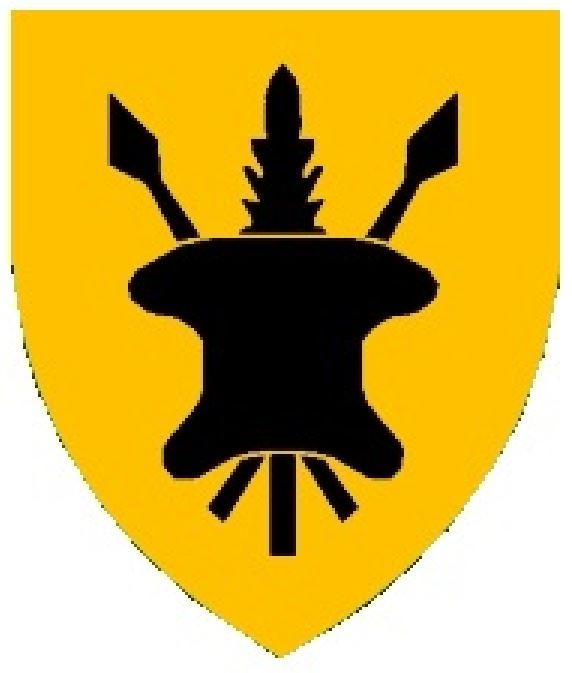
SADF 151 Battalion, this unit amalgamated with 1 SAI post 1994

==== Tempe military base shooting ====
In September 1999, Lt. S. Madubela from 1 SAI went on a shooting spree through the unit, killing seven personnel and injuring five, before being stopped and killed by his colleagues.

== Role ==
1 SAI is a regular mechanised infantry battalion of the South African Infantry Formation, equipped primarily with the Ratel family of vehicles.

In the draft South African Army Vision 2020 force design, the 2007 organograms published with Leon Engelbrecht's unpublished manuscript A Guide to the SANDF chart 1 SAI as the mechanised infantry battalion of the Armoured Brigade (Free State) within the Mechanised Division (headquarters Wallmansthal), alongside 1 SA Tank Regiment, the paired reserve tank regiment (Pretoria Regiment / Regiment President Steyn), and 1 SSB as the brigade armoured-car regiment.

== Equipment ==
=== Current ===
==== Vehicle mounted weapons ====
1 SAI is equipped with Ratel 20 Infantry Fighting Vehicles, Ratel 60 mm (2.4 in) Mortar Platform Vehicles, Ratel Command Vehicles with mounted 12.7 mm (0.50 in) machine guns, Kwevoel 100 Armoured Trucks for IFV Recovery, field maintenance, fuel bunkers and water provision, Samil 50 and 100 logistics trucks, Samil 20 trucks for its organic field workshops, Casspir APCs for its forward artillery observation party, and Rinkhals Field Ambulance. 1 SAI has also used Buffel IFVs and Mambas at certain stages in its history. Ratel mounted weapons include the Denel Land Systems GI-2 20 mm (0.79 in) Quick Firing Cannon (QFC) (Ratel mounted), 60 mm (2.4 in) breech-loading mortar (Ratel mounted), Browning M1919 Machine gun and the Browning M2 12.75 mm (0.502 in) Machine gun.

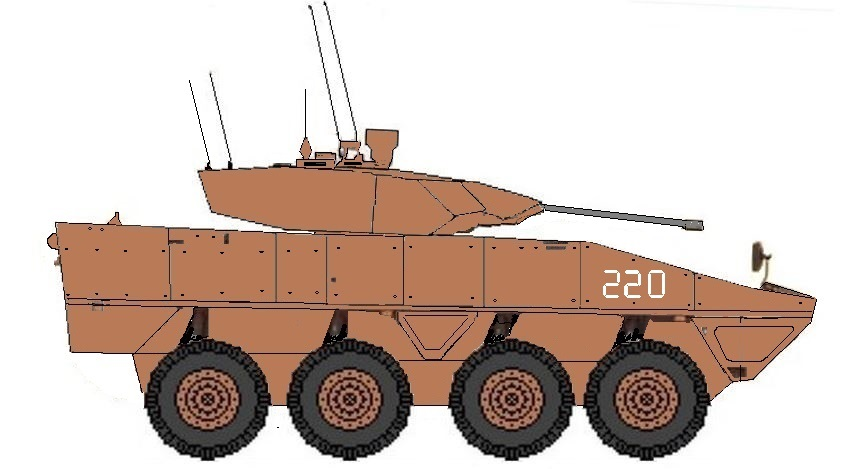
Badger IFV earmarked for replacement of the Ratel Fleet 2016 onwards

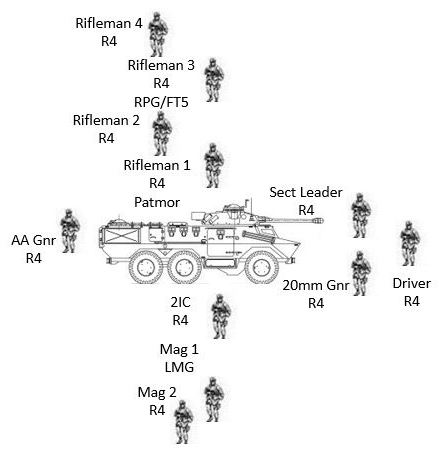
Ratel 20 IFV typical fighting section layout

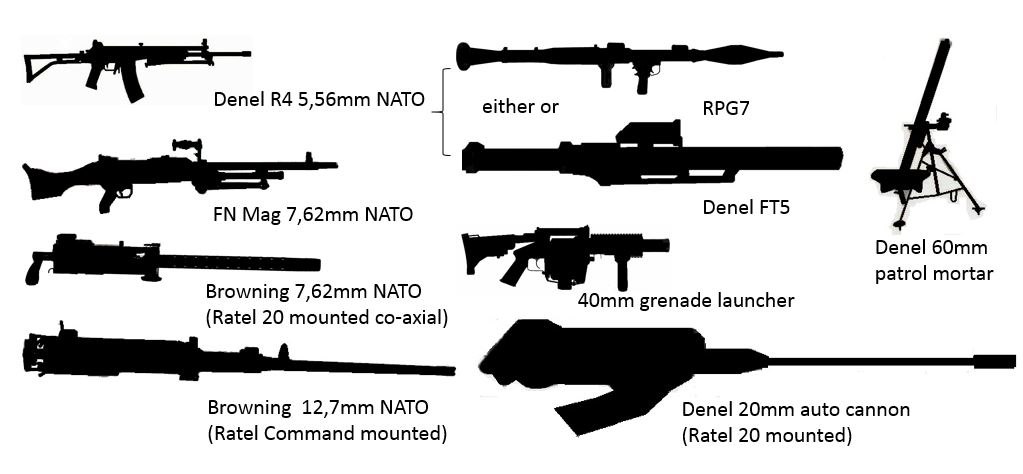
SA Mechanised Infantry Ordnance

==== Lighter and personal weapons ====
1 SAI is equipped with the Vektor SS77 Squad Automatic Machine gun, Fabrique Nationale 7.62 mm (0.300 in) Light Machine gun, Vektor R4 5.56 mm (0.219 in) assault rifle, 40 mm (1.6 in) Multiple Grenade Launcher (MGL), Rocket Propelled grenade launcher (RPG-7), M26 Fragmentation grenade, M4 60 mm (2.4 in) patrol mortar (PATMOR), and the Denel 99 mm (3.9 in) FT5 rocket launcher.

=== Historical Ratel fleet ===
In the early 1990s the battalion's fighting and A-echelon vehicles were organised around the Ratel family as follows.

==== Fighting Echelon Vehicles ====
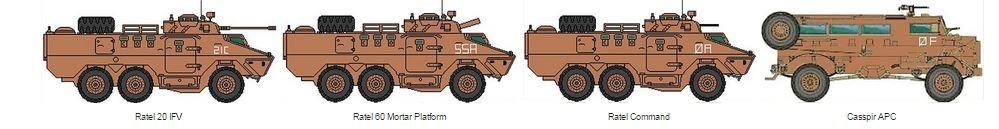

1 Ratel 20 per section, 3 sections per platoon, 1 Ratel 60 per platoon, 3 platoons per company. 2 Ratel 12,7 per company.

==== A Echelon Vehicles ====
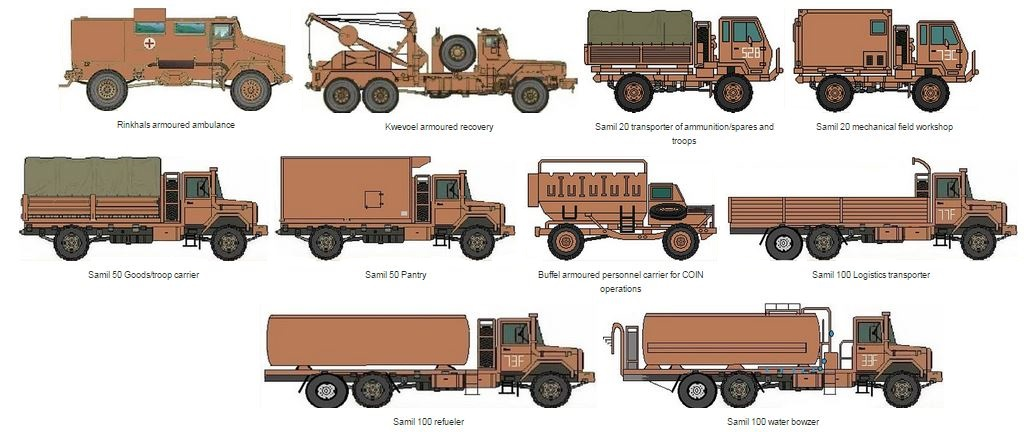

=== Future ===
Under Project Hoefyster, the SANDF will eventually replace the Ratel family of vehicles with the Badger system. Nine versions are contemplated of which three are earmarked for mechanized Infantry Battalions such as 1 SAI:

- Command (mech infantry)
- Mortar (turreted 60mm breech loading long-range mortar) ( mech infantry)
- Missile (turreted Denel ZT3 Ingwe)
- Section (turreted 30mm cannon) (mech infantry)
- Fire Support (turreted 30mm cannon, but with more ammunition than the section vehicle)
- Signal variant
- Ambulance variant
- Artillery variant
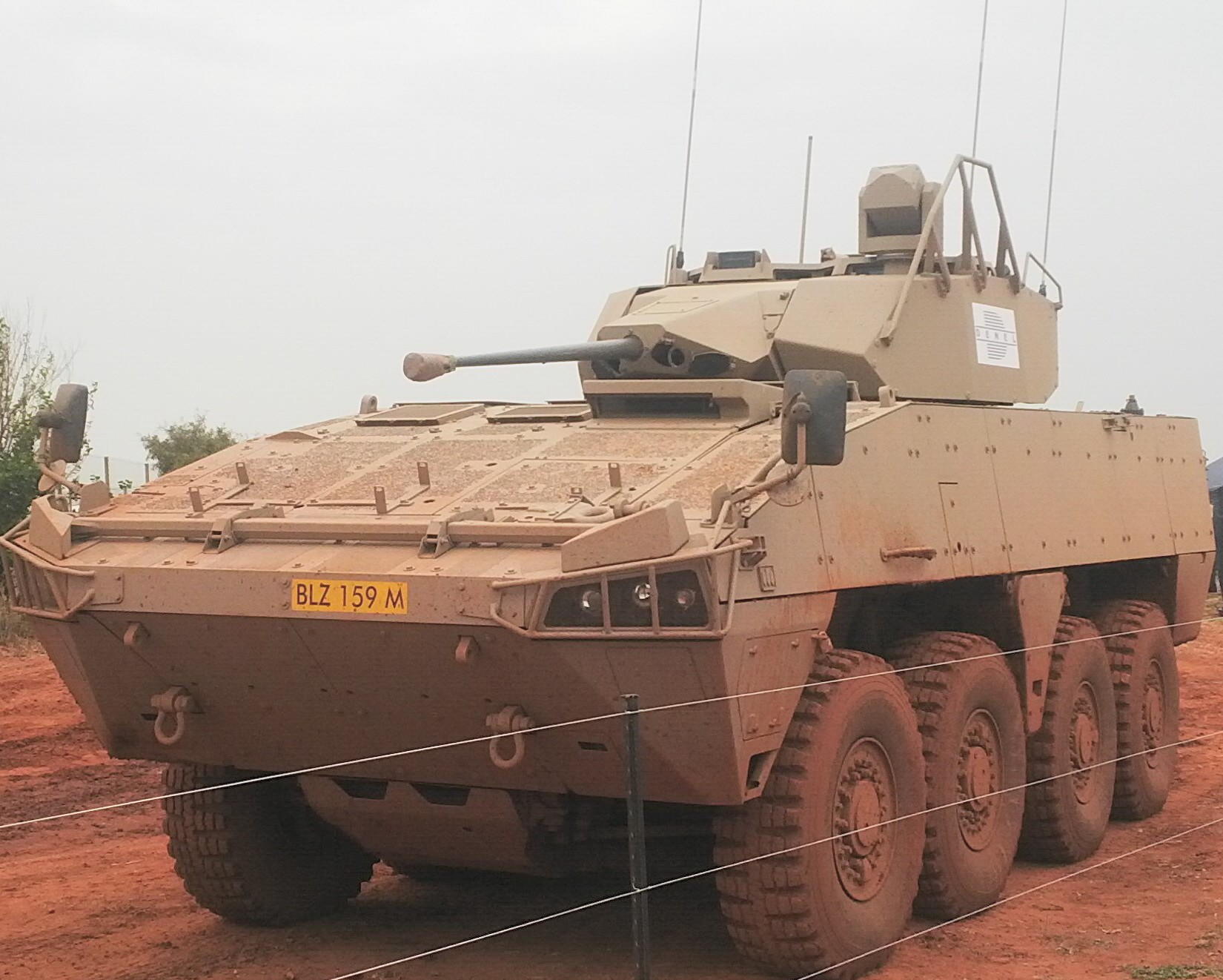
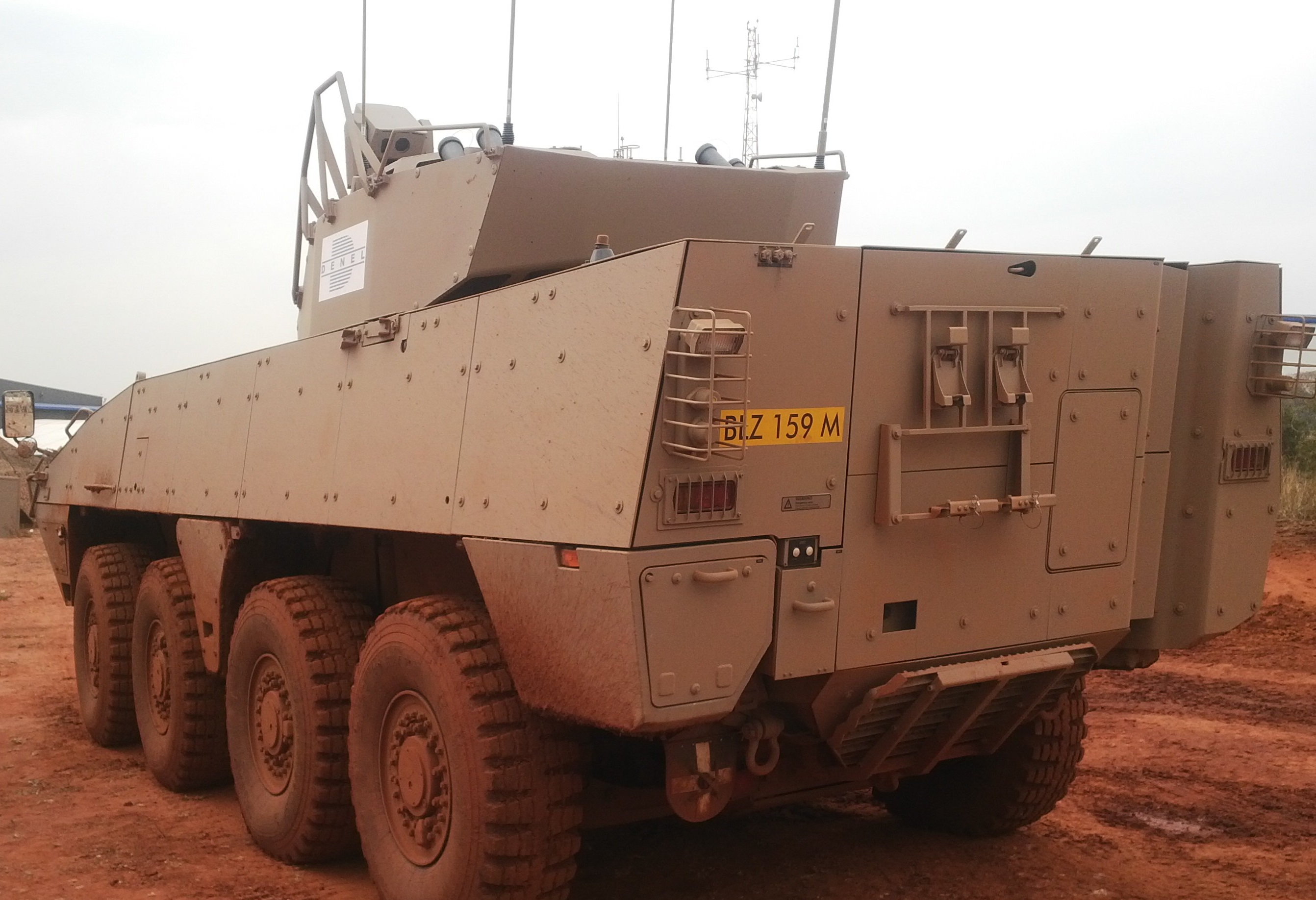
Badger IFV front and rear views

== Insignia ==
=== Previous Dress Insignia ===
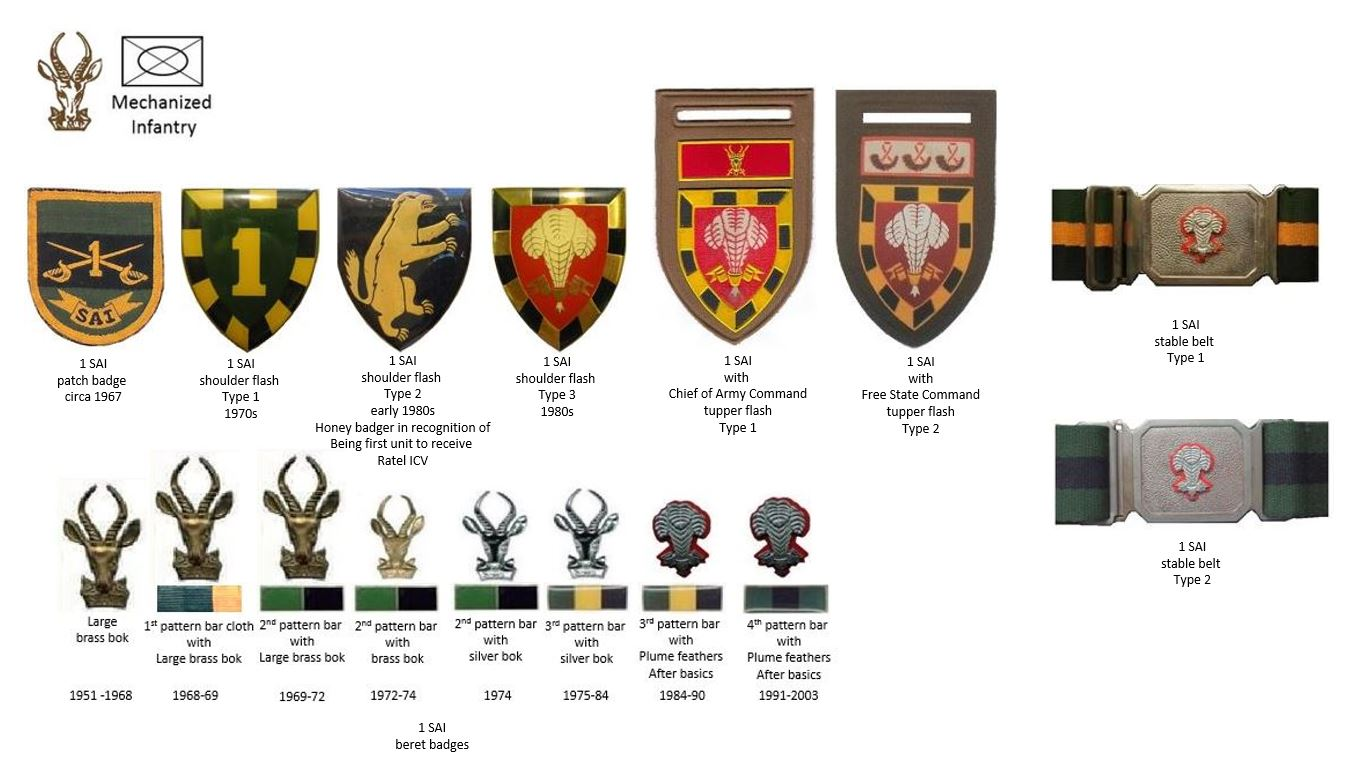
SADF era 1 SAI insignia

=== Current Dress Insignia ===
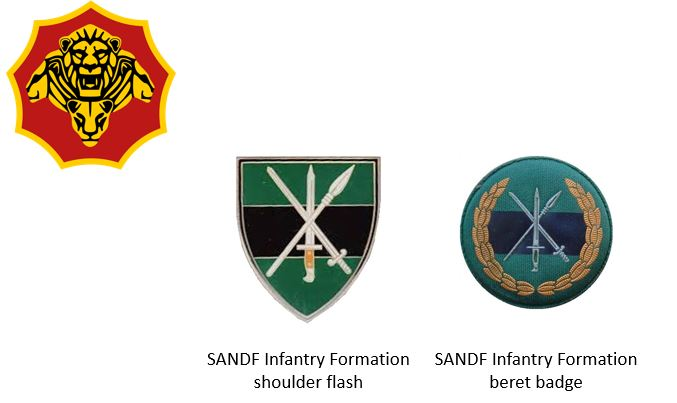
SANDF era Infantry Formation insignia

== Leadership ==
=== Battalion ===
Leadership
From	Honorary Colonel	To	Ribbon
	No known incumbents		
From	Officer Commanding	To	Ribbon
1967	Cmdt H.N.H. Norton	c. 1968	
1969	Cmdt B.P.U. Strydom	c. 1971	
1975	Cmdt Len Meyer SD,SM,MMM (Note: Later Lieutenant General) (Note: Later Director Infantry, Deputy Chief of the Army and Chief of Staff Personnel)	c. 1977	Southern Cross Decoration SD Southern Cross Medal SM Military Merit Medal MMM
1977	Cmdt A.J.M. Joebert	c. 1977	
1977	Cmdt Frank Bestbier	c. 1978	
1981	Col A. Savides	c. 1983	
1983	Col G.A. van Zyl	c. 1987	
1990	Col Cassie Schoeman	c. 1993	
1993	Col A. Bornman	c. 1995	
1995	Col C.J. van der Merwe	c. 1996	
1996	Lt Col Jan Wessels	c. 1999	
2004	Lt Col T.C. Mokhosi (Note: Later Chief of the South African Army)	c. 2008	
2013	Col T. Mashalaba	c. 2016	
2016	Lt Col T.S.A. Tseki	c. 2018	
2020	Lt Col M. Malatji	Nd	
From	Regimental Sergeants Major	To	Ribbon
1969	WO1 R.H. Uekermann	1972	
1973	WO1 A.A. Calmeyer	1976	
1976	WO1 L.B. Calitz	1980	
1980	WO1 J.R. Stone	1986	
1987	WO1 E.H. Heimann	1988	
1988	WO1 W.P. Wiese	1993	
1993	WO1 T.J. Visagie	1996	
1996	WO1 H.C.A Smit	1997	
1998	WO1 J.M Nel	2004	
2015	WO1 J. A. Koekemoer	Nd	

=== Mechanised Leadership Wing ===
Leadership
From	Officer Commanding	To	Ribbon
1978	Maj E. van Lill	c. nd	
1982	Cmdt Cassie Schoeman	c. 1985	
1995	Lt Col. K. Schmidt	c. nd	

== Traditions ==
=== Unit song ===
In 1 SAI wil ek bly,
dis die eenheid net vir my,
slaggereed en kommer vry,
met ons ratels veg ons ver,
onder die al en suider ster 1 SAI Bataljon,
1 SAI! Servire, servire, servire parati is ons lese as jy vra, 1 SAI Bataljon, 1 SAI!

From the shores of Cape Agulhas,
to the Northern bushveld trees,
We will fight our countries battles,
in the air, land and sea,
We will fight for right and freedom,
we will keep our honesty,
We are proud to claim the title of the 'Mechanised Infantry'.

== See also ==
- South African Army Vision 2020
- 61 Mechanised Battalion Group
- South African Border War
