= 6 South African Infantry Battalion =

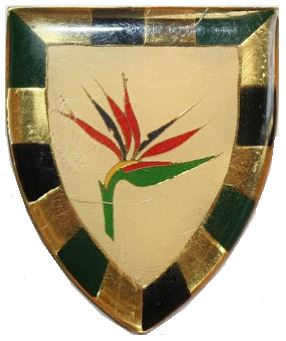
- 6 SAI emblem
- Active: 1 January 1962
- Country: South Africa
- Allegiance: Republic of South Africa; Republic of South Africa
- Branch: South African Army; South African Army
- Type: Air assault infantry
- Size: Battalion
Part of
South African Army Infantry Formation
- Garrison/HQ: Grahamstown, Eastern Cape
- Motto: Aliis Melius
Engagements
South African Border War
- Part of: South African Army
- Operations: Operation Protea; Operation Daisy
Peacekeeping
- Part of: United Nations Force Intervention Brigade
- Commanders: Lt Col Altin John Gysman
- Operations: Kibati; Triple Towers; Niyabiyondo

Commanders
- Current commander: Lt Col Altin John Gysman

Insignia
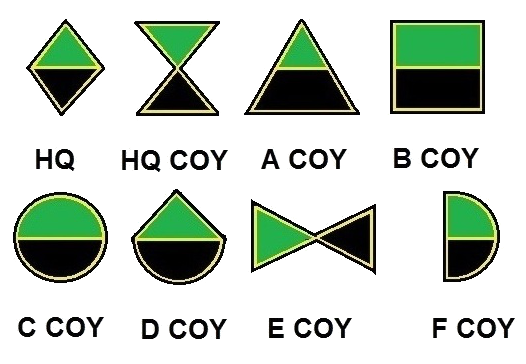
- Company level insignia

- SA Motorised Infantry beret bar circa 1992: SA Motorised Infantry beret bar

6 South African Infantry Battalion is an air assault infantry unit of the South African Army.

== History ==
6 SAI was established on 1 January 1962, at Grahamstown, Eastern Cape. The new training unit was housed on the property previously used by 44 Air School established by the Royal Air Force during the Second World War.

=== Bush War/ Namibia ===
The battalion became operational in 1970. 6 SAI took part in Operation Protea and Operation Daisy in Angola.

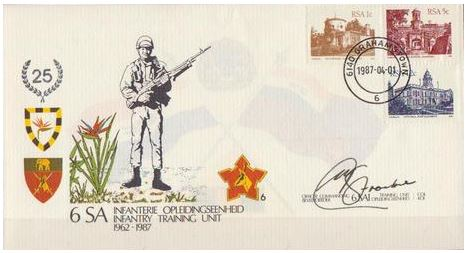
SADF 6 SAI Commemorative letter

=== 1984 Grahamstown riots ===
The Unit was involved in quelling the 1984 Grahamstown riots. The army had been called in to assist the South African Police who had failed to contain the situation.

==== Air Assault Infantry ====
The battalion has since become an air assault infantry unit specifically trained to deploy via helicopters.

Under the draft South African Army Vision 2020 force design, the 2007 organograms published with Leon Engelbrecht's unpublished manuscript A Guide to the SANDF chart 6 SAI as an air assault battalion in the Special Operations Brigade, paired with Prince Alfred's Guard (later renamed the Chief Maqoma Regiment), and also as motorised infantry under 6 Motorised Brigade (Eastern Cape) of the Motorised Division.

The battalion was deployed in April 2013 to the eastern Democratic Republic of Congo (DRC) as part of the United Nations Force Intervention Brigade.

==== Battle for Kibati ====
In 2013, 850 members of 6 SAI were part of the United Nations (UN) Force Intervention Brigade (FIB) authorised to use lethal force to achieve peace in the DRC. 6 SAIs involvement in the FIB saw the defeat of the M23 rebel group during the Battle of Kibati and other skirmishes. The first elements moved into the DRC on 28 April 2013 and the rest following from 15 June, with all 850 South African troops ready for action by 18 June.

Special Forces elements such as snipers were also attached to 6 SAI. When the FIB came under mortar fire, 6 SAI established an observation post at the triple towers site and engaged enemy targets up to 1400 meters.

==== Freedom of Grahamstown ====
On 28 August 2014, after their return from the Democratic Republic of Congo, the battalion was honoured with a Freedom of the City parade through Grahamstown.

== Leadership ==
6 SA Infantry Battalion Leadership
From	Commanding Officers - 6 SAI BN	To	Ribbon
21 January 1962	Cmdt S.J. Terblanche	31 July 1963	
1 August 1963	Cmdt M.N. Horner	19 December 1963	
20 December 1963	Cmdt H.N. Norton	18 September 1966	
19 September 1966	Cmdt F.A. Patten	30 November 1967	
1 December 1967	Cmdt C.J. Lloyd	1 November 1968	
02-11-1968	Cmdt H.F.P. Riekert	29-09-1972	
30-09-1972	Cmdt E.J.J. Nel	11-01-1976	
12-01-1976	Cmdt G.C.MG. Fourie	19-04-1979	
20-04-1979	Cmdt M.J. Grobler	31-12-1981	
01-01-1982	Cmdt F. Oelschig	18-10-1984	
From	Commanding Officers - 6 SAI Training Unit	To	Ribbon
18-10-1984	Cmdt F. Oelschig	28-02-1986	
01-03-1986	Cmdt P. J. Stroebel	31-12-1990	
From	Commanding Officers - 6 SAI BN	To	Ribbon
01-01-1991	Cmdt G. P. Nel	20-12-1991	
21-12-1991	Cmdt H. D. Du Plessis	17-12-1993	
18-12-1993	Lt Col J. Du Buisson	08-12-1995	
09-12-1995	Lt Col E. R. Rabie	07-07-1999	
08-07-1999	Lt Col A. P. J. Du Preez	31-01-2008	
31-08-2008	Lt Col M.S. Gopane	18-03-2010	
18-03-2010	Lt Col S.S. Ntsunguzi	23-02-2012	
23-02-2012	Lt Col Altin J. Gysman	29-01-2019	
29-01-2015	Col V.D. Maseko	22-02-2017	
22-02-2017	Lt Col M.A. Saki	2017	
2017	Lt Col Yandisa Gaxenia	Present	
From	Regimental Sergeants Major - 6 SAI BN	To	Ribbon
08-01-1962	WO1 P. J. Grove	31-12-1963	
01-01-1964	WO1 F. P. Smit	31-12-1964	
01-01-1969	WO1 D.J. Maritz	16-06-1964	
17-06-1974	WO1 J. J. Gous	31-12-1979	
01-01-1980	WO1 D. J. Oosthuizen	31-12-1981	
01-01-1982	WO1 J. M. Goodrich	18-10-1984	
From	Regimental Sergeants Major - 6 SAI Training Unit	To	Ribbon
18-10-1984	WO1 J.M. Goodrich	31-12-1987	
01-01-1988	WO1 W. van Onselen	31-12-1990	
From	Regimental Sergeants Major - 6 SAI BN	To	Ribbon
01-01-1991	WO1 J.F.E. Van Zyl	1993	
1993	WO1 W.R. Botha	1998	
1999	WO1 C.C. Richardson	2008	
10-10-2008	MWO C. H. "Cassie" Coetzee	Present	

== Insignia ==
=== Previous Dress Insignia ===
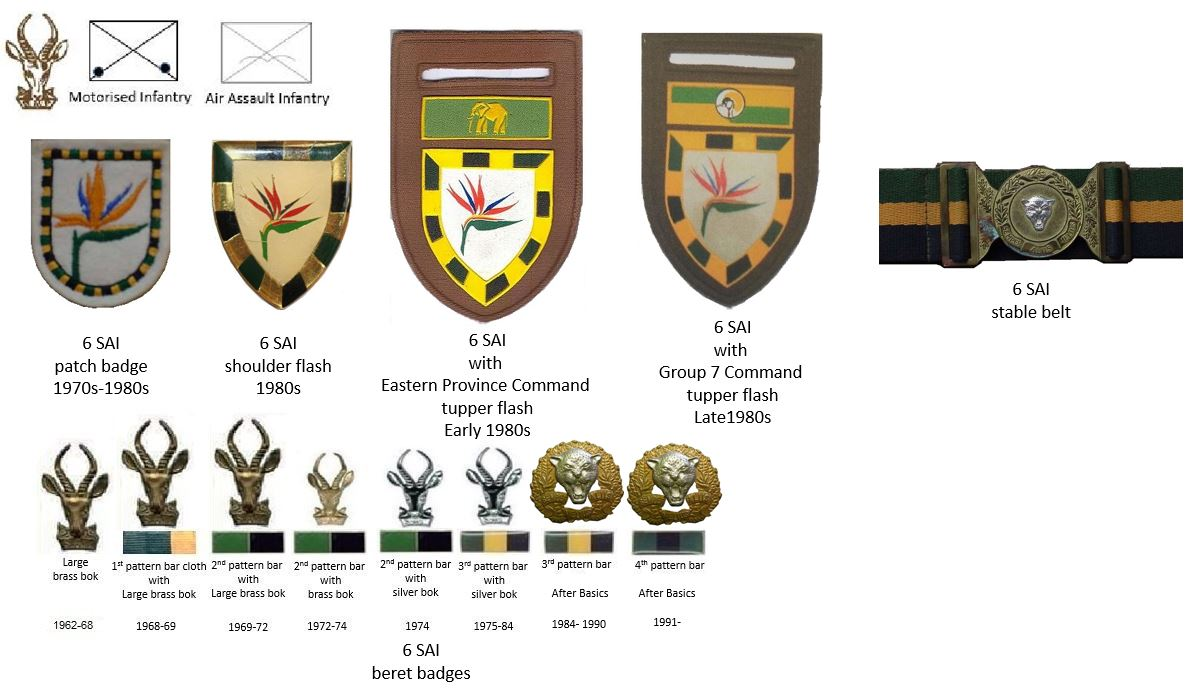
SADF era 6 SAI insignia

=== Current Dress Insignia ===
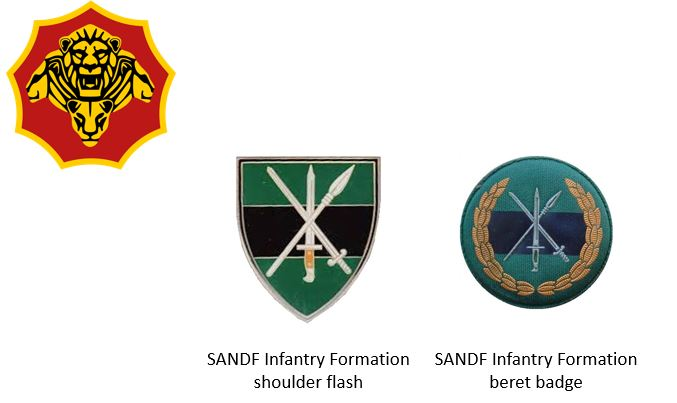
SANDF era Infantry Formation insignia

Air Assault (Qualification)
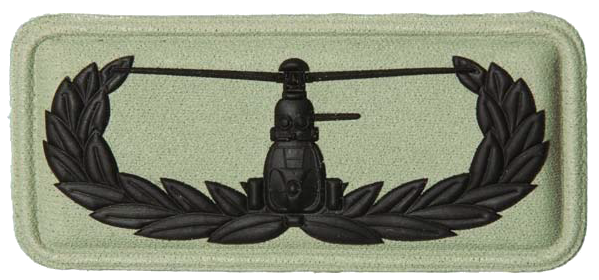
Black on Thatch beige, Embossed. Small Helicopter with wings

== Gallery ==
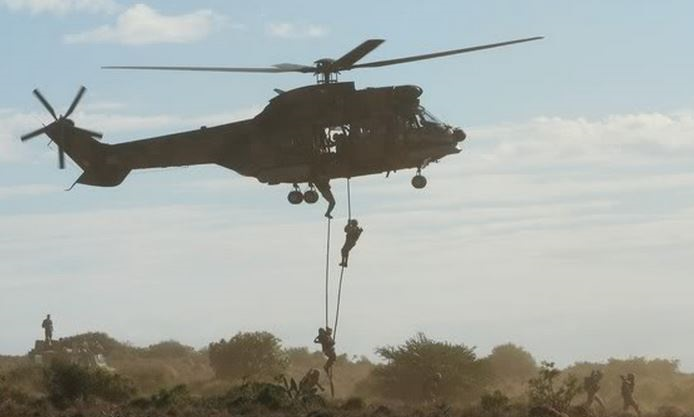
94847696rr>Bongani Vincent Mothobi/ID7303055734082

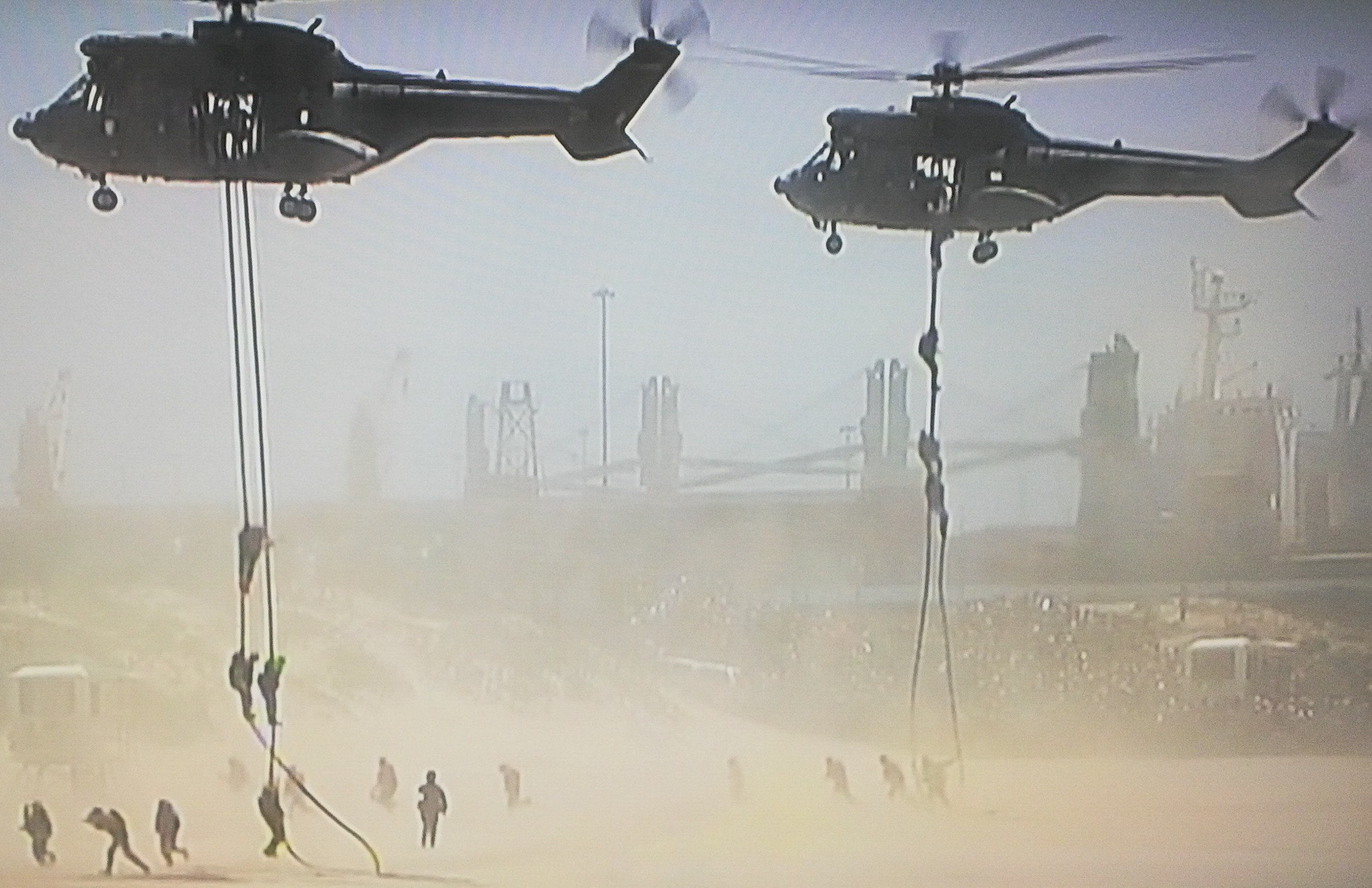

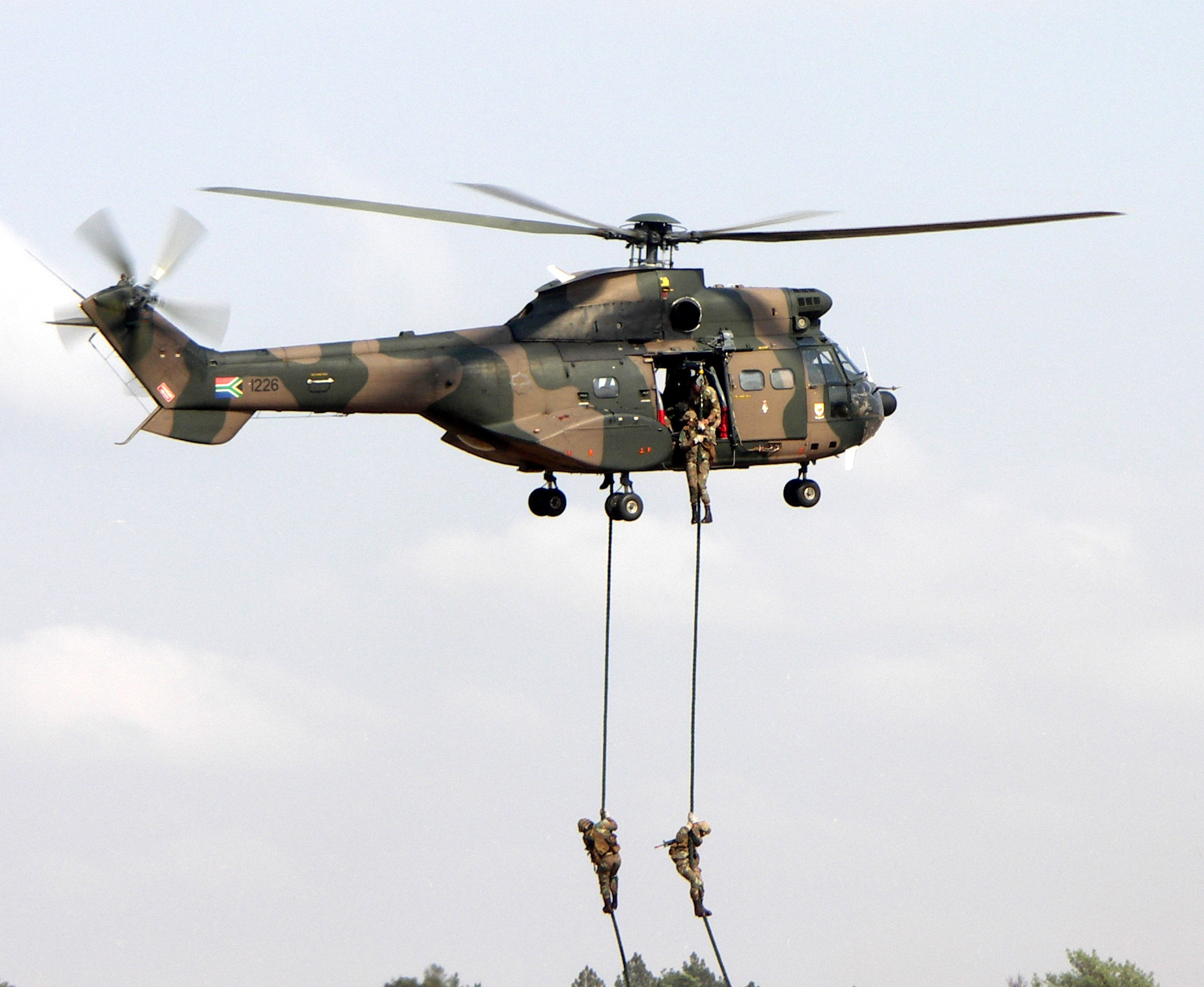

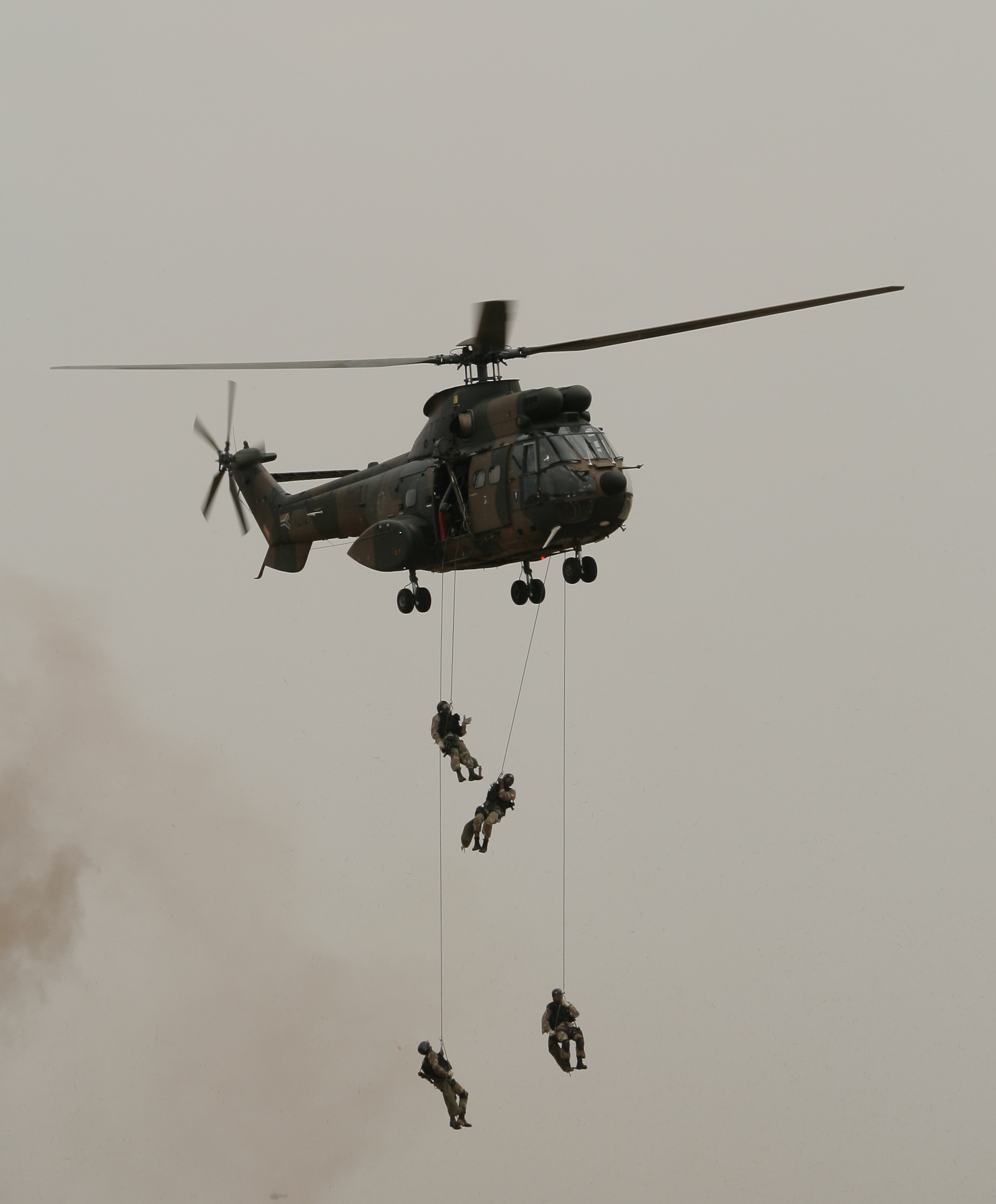

== Notes and references ==
- Cowell, Alan (8 October 1984). "Pretoria Will Use Army To End Riots". The New York Times.
