= Operation Sceptic =

Operation in the South African Border War (1980)

- Part of the South African Border War
- Location: Angola Operation Sceptic (Angola)
- Target: Various places
- Objective: Destroy SWAPO command and control structures and bases in Angola
- Date: 10 June – 1 July 1980
- Outcome: South African victory
- Casualties: 380 killed 17 killed

Operation Sceptic (June 1980) was the largest anti-South West Africa People's Organization (SWAPO) sweep during the South African Border War up to that point. The operation was also known as Smokeshell though this was the codename for the People's Liberation Army of Namibia (PLAN) base which was the main focus of the attack. This operation followed Operation Safraan and preceded Operation Klipklop.

== Overview ==
Operation Sceptic was launched on 10 June 1980 as a lightning attack on a SWAPO base in Southern Angola but developed into an extended operation as more and more SWAPO caches were discovered in the territory. Sceptic was due to end on 16 June but due to additional bases being discovered from intelligence gathered during the operation, the clashes continued and finally ended on 30 June with all South African Defence Force (SADF) forces back in SWA/Namibia by 1 July 1980. Operation Sceptic included serious clashes between the SADF and the People's Armed Forces for the Liberation of Angola (FAPLA).

== Order of battle ==
=== South African forces ===
Battle Group 61 – Commandant Dippies Dippenaar

- 61 Mechanised Battalion
- one company – 1 Parachute Battalion
- one mechanised company – 1 SA Infantry Battalion
- two engineer sections – 25 Field Squadron

Battle Group 10 – Commandant Chris Serfontein

- two companies – 1 Parachute Battalion
- one Eland 90 squadron – 61 Mechanised Battalion
- one engineer section – 25 Field Squadron
- one 81mm mortar group – 6 SAI Battalion

Battle Group 53 – Commandant Jorrie Jordan

- Bravo company – 32 Battalion
- two armoured car troops
- one 81mm mortar group – Army HQ
- two engineer sections – 25 Field Squadron

54 Battalion – Commandant Anton van Graan

- Delta & Echo companies – 32 Battalion
- one company – 1 Parachute Battalion
- one 81mm mortar platoon – 32 Battalion
- two engineer sections – 25 Field Squadron

== Planning ==
61 Mechanised Infantry Battalion Group had to destroy the SWAPO command, control and logistic structures at Chifufua (aka Smokeshell or QFL) and the defence positions at Londe, on 10 and 11 June 1980 respectively, and thereafter conduct area operations east of the general line AFL, Dova and Muleme as well as north of the general line Dunafuao, Mulavi and Ionde for approximately 10 days. Chifufua was 180 km north of the South West African border and consisted of thirteen sub-bases over an area of 45 square kilometres and under the command of Dimo Hamaambo.

The plan called for 54 Battalion to enter Angola, clear and control the region from the border to Mulemba, 90 km to the north and establish a forward helicopter landing base. This would occur two weeks before the operation was to begin. Then Battle Groups 10, 53 and 61 would cross into Angola and head for Chifufua. Battle Group 53 would operate in the vicinity of Chitumba close to Mulemba while Battle Group 10 and 61 would carry on to Chifufua and attack the PLAN bases in the vicinity.

The ground troops were to be supported by the South African Air Force (SAAF) in the form of bomber aircraft and helicopters such as gunships, troop transporters and medivac. Intelligence gathered for the planning could not establish enemy numbers at each of the thirteen complexes and believed the facilities to be above ground and not in the form of bunkers and trenches.

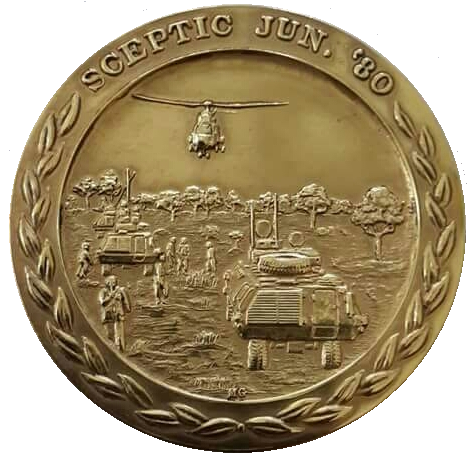
SADF Operation Sceptic Commemorative medallion

== Battle ==
On 25 May, 54 Battalion crossed the border into Angola and started securing the route of advance that the other battle groups would take in the following weeks. 54 Battalion secured the area up to Mulemba, which was 90 km into Angola, thereby establishing the HAA and staging area. During this period leading up to D-day, the group came into contact with PLAN soldiers and destroyed caches, losing two men with one missing in action, and secured the route by 9 June.

By 1 June, the remaining three battle groups began to train and conduct mock simulated attacks on the planned targets at various bases in SWA/Namibia. On 7 June, SAAF conducted two attacks, the first by Mirages on the PLAN base near Lubango in which two Mirages were damaged and the second attack at "Smokeshell" by Mirages and Buccaneers where no resistance was encountered. Training finally ended and the three battle groups met up at Eenhana on 9 June.

In the early morning of 10 June, the three battle groups left Eenhana and advanced towards Mulemba and the staging area. By 08h00, SAAF consisting of Mirages, Buccaneers and Impala's attacked various targets at "Smokeshell", Mulola and Ondova which would become the targets of the battle groups later in the afternoon. This time PLAN was prepared and anti-aircraft fire was received by the SAAF Mirages over "Smokeshell" from 23 mm AA guns and SA-7 missile fire. Due to the failure of the arrival of aviation fuel at the HAA, the helicopters were unable to deploy SADF troops to stop the retreat of any fleeing soldiers from "Smokeshell".

Battle Group 53 attacked the PLAN positions east of Mulemba while Battle Groups 61 and 10 headed towards Chitumba attacking "Smokeshell" later than planned, around 14h30. Initially the defenders were caught by surprise, but regrouped and fought back. What was supposed to be above ground defences turned out to be camouflaged bunkers and trenches. Elements of Battle Group 61 came under 23 mm AA fire, used in a ground attack role, that caused damage to several Ratel's, resulting in South African casualties in those vehicles and to soldiers attempting to escape them. By nightfall the Battle Groups 61 and 10 had to withdraw. The attacks resumed in the morning of 11 June, with the South Africans attacking and clearing the now empty bases. On withdrawing that evening, only 10 percent of the bases were cleared. The target was spread over thirteen bases, covering over forty five square kilometres.

Battle Group 10 was due to attack at Mulola, but had been called in to assist Battle Group 61. That attack was postponed until 14 June, but PLAN withdrew on 12 June, with the SADF stopper groups failing to prevent the withdrawal. Consequently, by the time Battle Group 10 arrived, it was deserted.

On 29 June, Battle Group 10 was attacked by FAPLA troops as it was withdrawing to South West Africa/Namibia. The SAAF was called to assist and FAPLA forces were attacked and forced to withdraw. By 1 July, all SADF forces had crossed back into SWA/Namibia.

== Aftermath ==
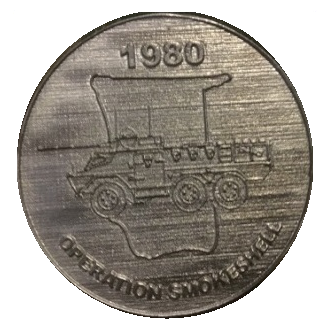
SADF Operation Smokeshell participation medallion

During the operation the South African forces clashed for the first time with mechanised elements of SWAPO SWAPO lost its forward base facilities and 380 killed. Several hundred tons of equipment and supplies as well as many vehicles were captured by the security forces. Seventeen members of the SADF force were killed.

Preceded by Operation Safraan	Battles and operations of the South African Border War; June 1980	Succeeded by Operation Klipklop
