= Operation Konyn =

- Part of the South African Border War
- Location: Operation Konyn (Angola)
- Objective: Destruction of air-defence installations and depots at and around the towns of Cahama and Chibemba in Angola.
- Date: 21–23 August 1981

Operation Konyn (English: Operation Rabbit) was a military operation by the South African Defence Force during the South African Border War and Angolan Civil War. Operation Konyn was launched on 21 August 1981. The operation preceded Operation Protea with the objective of destroying targets at Cahama and Chibemba in Angola. The Angolans had built a series of radar and early warning stations at Cahama, Chibemba, Lubango and Menongue. Attacking the first two target towns would ensure that the People's Armed Forces for the Liberation of Angola (FAPLA) would not interfere with the South African Air Force operations in support of South African Defence Force (SADF) ground troops taking part Operation Protea against People's Liberation Army of Namibia bases.

== Background ==
Planning for the operation began on the 21 August 1981 while SADF ground combat units begun to form up in position for Operation Protea that was to begin on the early morning of 23 August. On the morning of the 23 August, SAAF combat aircraft consisting of two Canberra bombers, eight Mirage F-1's and two Buccaneers attacked facilities at Cahama. Minutes later a further two Canberra bombers, sixteen Mirage F-1's attacked the radar installations at Chibemba. The radar facilities were heavily defended by SA-7s.

By the afternoon, five Canberra bombers returned to Cahama and bombed it again and later that evening the Buccaneer's returned and attacked a transport depot north east of this target town.

== Aftermath ==
On 26 August, during Operation Protea, the town of Cahama and Chibembe were again bombed by the SAAF. The following day FAPLA engineers arrived at the towns and begun to rebuild the radar installations and upgrade the defensive positions. At the same time a mechanised battalion of PLAN arrived at Cahama, under FAPLA command, to take up a defensive position.
