= Operation Klipklop =

Operation Reindeer
- Part of South African Border War
- Operation Klipklop (Angola)
Date	30 July 1980
Location	Angola
Result	South African victory

Belligerents
South Africa	SWAPO

Commanders and leaders
Marais Viljoen (South Africa) Unknown	Unknown

Units involved
SADF	Unknown

Strength
80	Unknown

Casualties and losses
None	27 killed

Operation Klipklop occurred during the South African Border War between the Republic of South Africa and SWAPO. The operation began at first light on the 30 July 1980 when South African forces attacked SWAPO facilities in Angola. The objective was a PLAN logistics base at the town of Chitado, 5 km from the Namibian border and 35 km east of Ruacana, with the aim of disrupting mortar attacks on the Ruacana hydro-electric scheme.

Supported by Alouette III attack helicopters, 80 men were dropped by helicopters close to the town. Twenty seven defenders, possibly PLAN or MPLA soldiers, died in the attack that followed with the SADF destroying the MPLA base in the town on their withdrawal. This operation followed Operation Sceptic and preceded Operation Protea.
