= Jakkals =

Jakkels
- Jakkals ready for airdrop
- Type: Air portable logistical support vehicle
- Place of origin: South Africa

Service history
- Used by: South African National Defence Force

Production history
- Designer: Colonel Phillip Jäckel (Technical Service Corps) SADF
- Manufacturer: Associated Automotive Distributors, Cape Town, South Africa

Specifications
- Mass: 1,120 kg (2,470 lb) with trailer.
- Length: 2.408 m (7.90 ft)
- Width: 1.22 m (4.0 ft)
- Crew: 1
- Passengers: 1
- Main armament: Mounted recoilless rifle, heavy and light machine guns, acting tractor for the Valkiri-5 rocket launcher or an anti-aircraft mount such as the ZU23-2 anti-aircraft cannon. Also tractor for 120mm mortar
- Engine: 1600cc
- Transmission: Manual, 4x4
- Maximum speed: 72 km/h (45 mph)

The Jakkals is a small, agile weapon carrier and utility vehicle for airborne units of the former South African Defence Force and current South African National Defence Force. The Jakkals can be deployed by land, lifted by helicopter, air dropped and delivered via aircraft.

Weapons mounted on the Jakkals include the 106mm M40 recoilless rifle, M2 Browning heavy machine gun, various general purpose machine guns as well as acting as a tractor for the Valkiri-5 multiple rocket launcher or anti-aircraft guns such as the ZU-23-2.

It can also be deployed with a small trailer and used as a logistical support vehicle, especially for the 120 mm mortars as with airborne artillery. The Jakkals has only been used in defense operations by the South African Airborne Units during the South African Border Wars.
