= Operation Daisy =

- Part of the South African Border War
- Location: Angola Operation Daisy (Angola)
- Objective: Attack the PLAN regional headquarters and bases at Chitequeta and Bambi.
- Date: 1–20 November 1981.
- Outcome: South African Success
- Casualties: 70 PLAN Soldiers were killed

Operation Daisy was a military operation conducted from November 1–20, 1981 by the South African Defence Force and South West African Territorial Force (SWATF) in Angola during the South African Border War and Angolan Civil War. This conflict was sparked when the South African Defence Force decided to try to halt the regroup of the active military branch of SWAPO, also known as the People's Liberation Army of Namibia.

The Operation was a success for the South African Defence Force as they destroyed a SWAPO command base and captured a significant number of weapons and ammunition. The SWAPO had to retreat back into Angola to the farthest place since the civil war 6 years earlier. In the end, 70 SWAPO members were killed, compared to 5 fatalities on the side of the South African Defence Force.

== Background ==
After the conclusion of Operation Protea, South-West Africa People's Organisation (SWAPO) were attempting to regroup the scattered PLAN soldiers at their regional headquarters and bases at Chitequeta and Bambi, in south-eastern Angola. Chitequeta lay 20–30 kilometres (12–19 mi) south of Indungo while Bambi was 35 kilometres (22 mi) south west of Chitequeta. As a result, the South African military decided to launch Operation Daisy against these bases – some 240 kilometres (150 mi) north of the South-West Africa-Angola border. The plan called for a South African mechanized force of Ratel Infantry Fighting Vehicles and Buffel Armoured Personnel Carriers assisted by airborne paratroopers, to cross the border and advance north, attacking the SWAPO bases from the 4 November 1981.

== Order of battle ==
=== South African forces ===
- 61 Mechanised Battalion
- 201 Battalion
- one company – 32 Battalion
- two companies – 1 Parachute Battalion
- three companies – 3 Parachute Battalion
- Special Forces reconnaissance teams
- UNITA liaison team

=== PLAN (SWAPO) forces ===
- Around Indungo HQ - approximately 400 men
- Chitequeta - a few hundred men
- Between Chitequeta and Bambi - up to a thousand men

== Battle ==
61 Mechanized set off on the 1 November from Omauni with a 32 Battalion reconnaissance team leading the way. 201 Battalion set off from Dova heading for a position 20 kilometres (12 mi) south west of Chitequeta. A 32 Battalion company were flown in by helicopter to establish a HAA (helicopter administrative area) position for future helicopter missions and this was established by the evening. Also, that evening a special forces reconnaissance team were parachuted into the Chitequeta area to establish a landing zone for the paratroopers and to finalize the whereabouts of the PLAN bases in that area which had been formally established by intelligence. By the 2 November, 61 Mechanized had reached the HAA and refueled while later during the day the SAAF begun to fly the transport and assault helicopters into the HAA. 32 Battalion reconnaissance team were leap-frogged to Ionde to check for enemy positions and that would become the position for the SADF tactical headquarters the following day.

During the early morning of the 3 November, a 32 Battalion company was flown in to Ionde to establish the headquarters and to make use of the runway at the airfield. This transfer of men and aircraft occurred throughout the day and where 1 Parachute Battalion would be held in reserve. Later during the day, 201 Battalion which was still making its way to its final position, ran into a group of PLAN soldiers heading south and a battle took place in which four SADF soldiers were wounded with the possibility that the operation had been compromised. A HAA was also moved northwards to a position 60 kilometres (37 mi) south east of Chitequeta which 61 Mechanized reached that afternoon.

At 3:00, 4 November, 61 Mechanised set off for Chitequeta with the attack to begin at 08h30. By 4:00 the Special Forces reconnaissance team were in contact with headquarters and believed the base was empty. 3 Parachute Battalion was flown in to Chitequeta and parachuted 20 kilometres (12 mi) north west of the target and proceeded to sweep towards the bases. 201 Battalion had also reached their position by the attack time. Fifteen minutes before the attack, Buccaneer bombers attacked the PLAN positions followed minutes later by Mirage bombers that came under fire from SA-7 missiles and 23 mm AA guns and further attacks were called in throughout the morning. 61 Mechanized attacked Chitequeta from the north and the east. Apart from a few isolated engagements, where two UNITA and two SADF soldiers were killed, the target areas trenches and bunkers were found to be deserted apart from anti-tank and personnel mines. The tactical headquarters were brought forward and 61 Mechanized spent the night at Chitequeta. The following day saw the establishment of another HAA at Chitequeta and the day was spent clearing out the bunkers and minefields, losing one soldier in process. These clearing operations continued on the 6 November with the only enemy contact made was by 32 Battalion close to Ionde. Later on the same day a SAAF Mirage shot down an Angolan MiG-21. The last time an enemy aircraft had been shot down by the SAAF was during the Korean War.

On the 7 November, 61 Mechanised headed south west towards Bambi and again found a deserted base apart from anti-tank and personnel mines. Here they spent the next two days encamped and patrolling the area. An enemy force was sighted near Ionde on the 9 November and were engaged by Alouette helicopters and by an airborne assault by paratroopers.

10 November saw 61 Mechanised move south from Bambi towards Mupa while a reconnaissance team was flown into Chitequeta to lay mines at the abandoned base to prevent or hinder resettlement by PLAN forces after the SADF had ended their mission. An unsuccessful paratroop mission was attempted on a suspected target area on the 11 November while 61 Mechanised and other units headed still further south. 12 November, 201 Battalion attempted to make contact with the enemy but were again unsuccessful and the column continued south. By the 13 November, the SAAF began to wind back operations, while paratroopers again attempted to find a possible target around Mupa but eventually all paratroops were withdrawn back to bases in SWA/Namibia that evening. 61 Mechanised was close to Mupa by the 14 November while 201 Battalion was close to Dova. Air missions found another abandoned base. On the 15 November, 61 Mechanised arrived at Mupa and stayed there until the 17 November. Intelligence identified two possible bases for 61 Mechanised and 201 Battalion to attack but reconnaissance on the ground failed to find anything except abandoned bases. Leaving Mupa, 61 Mechanised Battalion reached Ongiva on the 18 November. By the 19 November it had crossed the border back into SWA/Namibia and were back at their base by the 20 November.

== Aftermath ==
During the operation seventy SWAPO members were killed. In spite of this, due to the immense size of the complex - about thirty-five square kilometres – most of the 1,200 SWAPO members at the base were able to escape into the bush. Nevertheless the South African forces considered the operation to be a success as they had destroyed yet another SWAPO command and logistic base within three months of Operation Protea and had also captured a large quantity of arms and ammunition. The SWAPO membership was also further demoralised, as they had to move even further north into Angola. Casualties on the South African side consisted of two UNITA members killed with the SADF/SWATF suffering three killed and twelve wounded. For the South African forces, the attack on Chitequeta was their deepest penetration into Angola since the civil war started six years before.
