= List of operations of the South African Border War =

This List of operations of the South African Border War details the military operations conducted by the South African Defence Force during the South African Border War:

- Operation Savannah (1975)
- Operation Bruilof (1978)
- Operation Seiljag (1978)
- Operation Reindeer (1978)
- Operation Rekstok (1979)
- Operation Safraan (1979)
- Operation Sceptic (Smokeshell) (1980)
- Operation Vastrap (July 1980)
- Operation Klipklop (1980)
- Operation Winter (1980)
- Operation Wishbone SAAF Operation (December 1980)
- Operation Vasbyt (1981)
- Operation Konyn (1981)
- Operation Carnation (1981)
- Operation Protea (1981)
- Operation Daisy (1981)
- Operation Kerslig (1981)
- Operation Rekstok III SAAF Operation (March 1982)
- Operation Super (1982)
- Operation Meebos (1982)
- Operation Bravo (Angola) SAAF Operation (October 1982)
- Operation Maanskyn SAAF Operation (1983)
- Operation Drama (1983)
- Operation Phoenix (South Africa) (1983)
- Operation Skerwe SAAF Operation (1983)
- Operation Dolfyn (1983)
- Operation Karton (1983)
- Operation Klinker (1983)
- Operation Askari (1983)
- Operation Nobilis (1984)
- Operation Gordel (1984)
- Operation Kabul (1985)
- Operation Salamander (1985)
- Operation Boswilger (1985)
- Operation Egret (1985)
- Operation Argon (1985)
- Operation Magneto (1985)
- Operation Wallpaper (1985)
- Operation Cerebus (1985)
- Operation Abrasion (1985)
- Operation Southern Cross (1986)
- Operation Alpha Centauri (1986)
- Operation Moduler (1987)
- Operation Firewood (1987)
- Operation Hooper (1988)
- Operation Packer (1988)
- Operation Excite/Hilti (1988)
- Operation Prone (1988)
- Operation Vuiswys (1988)
- Operation Displace (1988)
- Operation Merlyn (1989)
- Operation Linger (1989)
- Operation Agree (1989)
