= Battle of Cassinga =

Controversial South African airborne attack on a SWAPO military base

- Part of the South African Border War
Date	4 May 1978
Location	Cassinga, Angola Battle of Cassinga (Angola) 15°7′3″S 16°5′11″E
Result	South African victory

Belligerents
South Africa	SWAPO; Cuba; Angola

Commanders and leaders
(South Africa) Constand Viljoen (South Africa) Ian Gleeson (South Africa) Jan Breytenbach	Dimo Hamaambo

Units involved
SADF	SWAPO: Unknown

Strength
370 soldiers 4 Canberra B-12 bombers 5 Buccaneer fighters 4 Mirage III fighters 4 C-130 Hercules transport planes 5 Transall C-160 transport planes 13 Aerospatiale Puma helicopters 6 Super Frelon helicopters	SWAPO: 300–600 guerrillas 2 ZPU-4 AA guns 1 ZU-23-2 AA gun 1–2 ZSU AA guns 3,000–4,000 refugees Cuba: 144–400 soldiers 4 T-34 tanks 17 BTR-152 APCs; 7 trucks 4 AA guns

Casualties and losses
3 killed 11 wounded 1 missing	Cuba: 150 soldiers killed 3 T-34 destroyed 17 BTR-152 destroyed SWAPO: unknown 40 captured
- 624 dead and 611 wounded in total (Angolan government claim) 582 dead and 400 wounded in total (SWAPO claim)

The Battle of Cassinga also known as the Cassinga Raid or Kassinga Massacre was a controversial South African airborne attack on a South West Africa People's Organization (SWAPO) military camp at the town of Cassinga, Angola on 4 May 1978. Conducted as one of the three major actions of Operation Reindeer during the South African Border War, it was the South African Army's first major air assault operation.

== Background ==
Starting in 1976, SWAPO PLAN combatants regularly travelled south by road from Huambo through Cassinga, an abandoned Angolan mining town that was located about halfway to the battlefront at the Namibian border. The town had about twenty buildings that previously served the local iron-ore mine as warehouses, accommodation and offices.

A group of PLAN guerrillas led by Dimo Hamaambo occupied Cassinga some weeks after they began using it as a stopover point; according to both Charles "Ho Chi Minh" Namoloh and Mwetufa "Cabral" Mupopiwa, who accompanied Hamaambo when the village was first occupied, the first Namibian inhabitants of Cassinga consisted entirely of trained PLAN combatants. Not long after the establishment of the PLAN camp at Cassinga, it began to function also as a transit camp for Namibian exiles. The Angolan government allocated the abandoned village to SWAPO in 1976 to cope with the influx of thousands of refugees from South West Africa, estimated in May 1978 to total 3,000 to 4,000 people.

Two days before the South African raid, UNICEF reported of a "well-run and well-organized" camp but "ill-equipped" to cope with the rapid refugee increase in early 1978. The Cubans, who set up a base at nearby Techamutete when they intervened in the war in 1975, provided logistical support to the SWAPO administration at Cassinga.

According to SADF intelligence, "Logistic planning and the provision of supplies, weapons and ammunition to insurgents operating in central and eastern Ovamboland were undertaken from Cassinga", which they learned from PLAN POWs was codenamed "Moscow". Medical treatment of the seriously wounded as well as the repair of equipment and the assembly of newly trained insurgents on their way to bases in the East and West Cunene Provinces all took place in Cassinga."

== South African planning ==
By the beginning of 1978 SWAPO had improved its organisation and gained strength in Owambo and the Eastern Caprivi, UNITA was under pressure from the MPLA, and it became increasingly difficult for the SADF to operate in Southern Angola. South Africa also feared the disruption of elections it planned to hold in South West Africa excluding SWAPO.

The attack on Cassinga grew out of the plan for Operation Bruilof, wherein the SADF envisaged attacking six SWAPO targets around the town of Chetequera. During the intelligence-gathering portion of the planning for Operation Bruilof, the SADF concluded that the small town of Cassinga was the principal medical, training and control centre for the guerrillas in the region, and one of SWAPO's two regional HQs, the other being further north at Lubango.

The SAAF still held air superiority over Angola at the time, allowing 12 Squadron to conduct aerial photo-reconnaissance with Canberra B12s in the spring of 1978. These photos showed newly built military infrastructure including concrete 'drive-in' bunkers for armoured fighting vehicles covering approach roads, zigzag trenches surrounding the base, foxholes for machine guns/mortar crews – and the highly characteristic 'star-shaped' concrete base structure for a S-75/SA-2 'Guideline' missile battery and its radar/command vehicle. Also identifiable from the imagery was a civilian single-decker bus.

PLAN combatants at Cassinga were aware of the overflights, and in a letter dated 10 April 1978, the camp's commander Hamaambo expressed concerns to his superiors about an "imminent invasion intention of our enemy of our camp in Southern Angola". In response to the reconnaissance flights, defenses were improved through the creation of a secondary camp north of the main camp, the addition of more trenches, the digging of holes for the protection of food provisions, and provision of AAA weapons.

The SADF shelved the plan for Operation Bruilof and planning for a new operation, Operation Reindeer, began. Reindeer was composed of three main actions; the airborne assault on Cassinga, a mechanised assault on the Chetaquera complex at 17.1287°S 14.8938°E – that also involved SAAF defence-suppression strikes – and an assault on the Dombondola complex at 17.333°S 14.8334°E by a light infantry force.

The planners for the operation were faced with a significant problem. While the Chetequera and Dombondola complexes were only around 35 km from the border with South West Africa/Namibia (then under South African control), therefore making conventional assault possible, Cassinga was deep inside Angola, 260 km from the border. This meant that any conventional assault force would have to fight its way in and out, and would almost certainly have given advance warning to the PLAN (People's Liberation Army of Namibia – SWAPO's armed wing) soldiers in Cassinga, allowing them and leaders like Jerobeum 'Dimo' Amaambo (the PLAN commander-in-chief, then resident in Cassinga) and Greenwell Matongo to escape. Cassinga furthermore was located on a small hill, flanked by a river on its west side, and open fields in other directions, factors that combined to give any defenders the advantage.

However, South African Defence Force (SADF) intelligence reports had ascertained that SWAPO – and probably its advisers – was lulled into a false sense of security because of Cassinga's distance from the Namibian border to the south. South African military intelligence briefings before the event indicated no awareness of any nearby supportive infantry or armoured units to support the base against a ground assault, and although SWAPO had been constructing a system of integrated defensive trenches and firing points for wheeled/tracked AFVs and AAA units, they were not then prepared for a joint-arms airborne attack. The SADF had not previously demonstrated any such capability, giving military analysts no reason to suspect that such an option was available to the SADF planners. The planners therefore believed that they could conduct a surprise attack on the base using only a lightly armed airborne force. Earlier in that year, SAAF 12 Squadron had commenced training for a low-level strike role, utilising anti-personnel weapons such as cluster bombs. The South Africans knew about the success of Operation Eland and Operation Dingo, pre-emptive raids conducted in the previous two years by the Rhodesian Selous Scouts against guerilla forces based in Mozambique, and modeled their raid on many of the same principles. Though a risky plan it was decided that the element of surprise would outweigh the disadvantage of not having supporting armour on the ground.

The SADF decided to mount a large airborne assault on Cassinga (by now code-named "Alpha"), supported by South African Air Force (SAAF) fighter-bombers and a fleet of 17 medium-transport helicopters. Using an exercise already underway called Exercise Kwiksilver as a cover story, the army initiated a call up of the Citizen Force (reserve units similar to the US National Guard) parachute units. The paratroopers conducted refresher training at the base of 1 Parachute Battalion (1 Bn) in Bloemfontein and then field training in the area surrounding the derelict Rheinholdtskop farm on the De Brug Training Area.

A top secret document prepared by General Magnus Malan for the then Minister of Defence, P. W. Botha, refers to Cassinga as "a large SWAPO base located 260 km north of the border. (Note: The border referred to here is the Namibian–Angolan border.) It is the operational military headquarters of SWAPO from where all operations against SWA are planned and their execution co-ordinated. From this base all supplies and armaments are provided to the bases further forward. Here training also takes place. In short, it is probably the most important SWAPO base in Angola. The nearest Cuban base is 15 km South of Alpha."

The South African cabinet was hesitant to authorise the operation, fearing an international backlash, but on 2 May 1978 the Prime Minister, John Vorster, finally approved the operation. The date of 4 May was specifically chosen as it was after the United Nations Security Council debate on South West Africa ended so as to "avoid making lives difficult for those countries favourable to South Africa".

== Composition of forces ==
=== South Africa ===
Airborne forces committed to the battle

Because of the secrecy involved in the operation, and the commitment of most of the professional "permanent force" troops and "national servicemen" conscripts of 1 Bn in other operations, it was decided to use 2 and 3 Parachute Battalions (2 Bn & 3 Bn), both reserve or "Citizen Force" units, in the operation. However, the need for secrecy meant not enough Citizen Force soldiers could be called up to fill both Parachute Battalions. As a result, all three were temporarily merged into a single composite Parachute Battalion, which was commanded by Colonel Jan Breytenbach. The final composition of forces for the attack on Cassinga was therefore the following:

- The entire operation was run by Major General Ian Gleeson, who commanded the SWA Tactical HQ (set up specially for Operation Reindeer).
- Overall control of the airborne forces was given to Brigadier M.J. du Plessis, who commanded the Parachute Brigade HQ. The units under his command were the Composite Parachute Battalion under Colonel Breytenbach that was composed of A, B, C and D companies (all under-strength), an independent rifle platoon, a mortar platoon and an anti-tank platoon;
- The Helicopter Administration Area (HAA) protection force under Major James Hills, consisting of two Hawk Groups (10-man sections of rapid-reaction paratroopers) from 1 Bn;
- An Airborne Reserve under Captain Wesley de Beer, consisting of a company from 2 Bn airborne in a C.160 to be used in the event of reinforcements being required, and the Mobile Air Operations Team (MAOT) under Commandant James Kriel, which consisted of five SAAF personnel to set up and run the HAA. All the paratroopers were equipped with a folding stock version of the R1 7.62 mm assault rifle.
- The South African Air Force contribution consisted of four C-130 Hercules and five C.160 Transall transport aircraft. The helicopter component of the operation consisted of 13 Pumas and six Super Frelons.
- The air attack component provided by the SAAF consisted of four Canberra B-12 bombers, each carrying 300 Alpha anti-personnel bombs; five Buccaneers carrying eight 1,000 lb (450 kg) bombs each, as well as a sixth carrying seventy-two 68 mm rockets, and lastly four Mirage III fighter aircraft, armed only with Sidewinder air-to-air missiles and their 30 mm cannons fitted with high-explosive fragmentation shells.

One crew from the Canberra squadron was tasked with acquiring further photo-reconnaissance imagery, some to be used in the preparation of photo-strip maps for the Tactical Low Flying (TLF) legs that the various aircraft types would undertake – there being inadequate conventional mapping of much of the region – and additional and up-to-date detailed imagery of the Cassinga environs for the Parabat drop zone and Buccaneer target planning purposes. Particular attention was paid to identifying units of AAA deployed in/near the target complex. It was during this phase that a serious error was made, with potentially disastrous consequences.

Air-photo interpreters put the wrong scale on some of the maps that were used in the planning, despite the altimeter readings being clearly visible in the original reconnaissance photographs. Consequently, the air force planners overestimated the size of the DZ, believing it was long and wide enough to drop the paratroopers, when in fact it wasn't. This 'scale error' also mispositioned the 'Warning' and 'Drop' points on the run-in to drop. Compounding this error, the pilot of the lead aircraft was momentarily distracted by the effects of the bombing, and issued the 'jump' signal a few seconds late. The net effect was that many paratroopers overshot their intended DZs, many landing beyond the river – and some in it.

Playing a supporting role was a single Cessna C-185, which flew in the target area and acted as an observation post as well as a radio relay aircraft. In addition there was a single DC-4 Strikemaster fitted out as an EW and ELINT aircraft flying over the SWA/Namibia border with Angola. The purpose of this latter aircraft was to both intercept all Angolan, Cuban and SWAPO radio transmissions, before jamming their communications networks at the appropriate time. The successful jamming of the SWAPO, Angolan and Cuban communications network is one of the reasons for the late reaction by either of the latter two in responding to the attack.

=== PLAN ===
PLAN, the armed wing of SWAPO, was a guerrilla army and therefore did not have a traditional command and control structure. As such, it is impossible to determine a composition of units inside Cassinga. According to TRC findings, a self-defence unit posted at Cassinga consisted of approximately 300 male and female PLAN cadres (other source: approximately 300 to 600). The military section of Cassinga was easily partitioned from the non-military sections. The overall commander of PLAN in town was Dimo Amaambo, who responsible for the co-ordination of all PLAN actions in Southern Angola, including incursions into South West Africa/Namibia. A headquarters such as Cassinga was second in importance only to Lubango, which was the overall SWAPO military headquarters in Angola. Aside from the system of trenches and bunkers, defensive equipment included two ZPU-4 14.5 mm anti-aircraft guns, one ZU-23-2 23 mm gun, and around one or two ZSU 12.7 mm guns. These were capable of being used in a ground attack role.

=== Cuba ===
The nearest Cuban military presence was 15 km south of Cassinga, at the village of Techamutete, located at 15.2332°S 16.04°E. It consisted of a reinforced mechanised battalion of at least four T-34 tanks, 17 BTR-152 armoured personnel carriers, seven trucks and four anti-aircraft guns, accompanied by around 400 troops. This unit was known to SADF intelligence, who had intercepted their radio traffic, and were also aware of their anti-UNITA operations. Their strength was estimated at 144 in October 1977, and was a major contributing factor in the choice of air rather than a ground assault. In briefing the strike aircrew, the SAAF Chief of Staff Intelligence was specific that there was no known military formation within 80 miles, except for a detachment of 'African police' with one truck. In debriefs, when questioned by commanders and aircrew of the 2 strike components, Canberras and Buccaneers, he insisted that the Cuban formation being just some 15 km to the south at Techamutete was 'a complete surprise and must have been deployed there in recent days'. Certainly, no photo reconnaissance over that village/road junction was ordered, but could easily have been included in the later Canberra PR overflights of Cassinga.

== Attack ==
=== 04h00 – 09h00 ===
==== Air movements ====
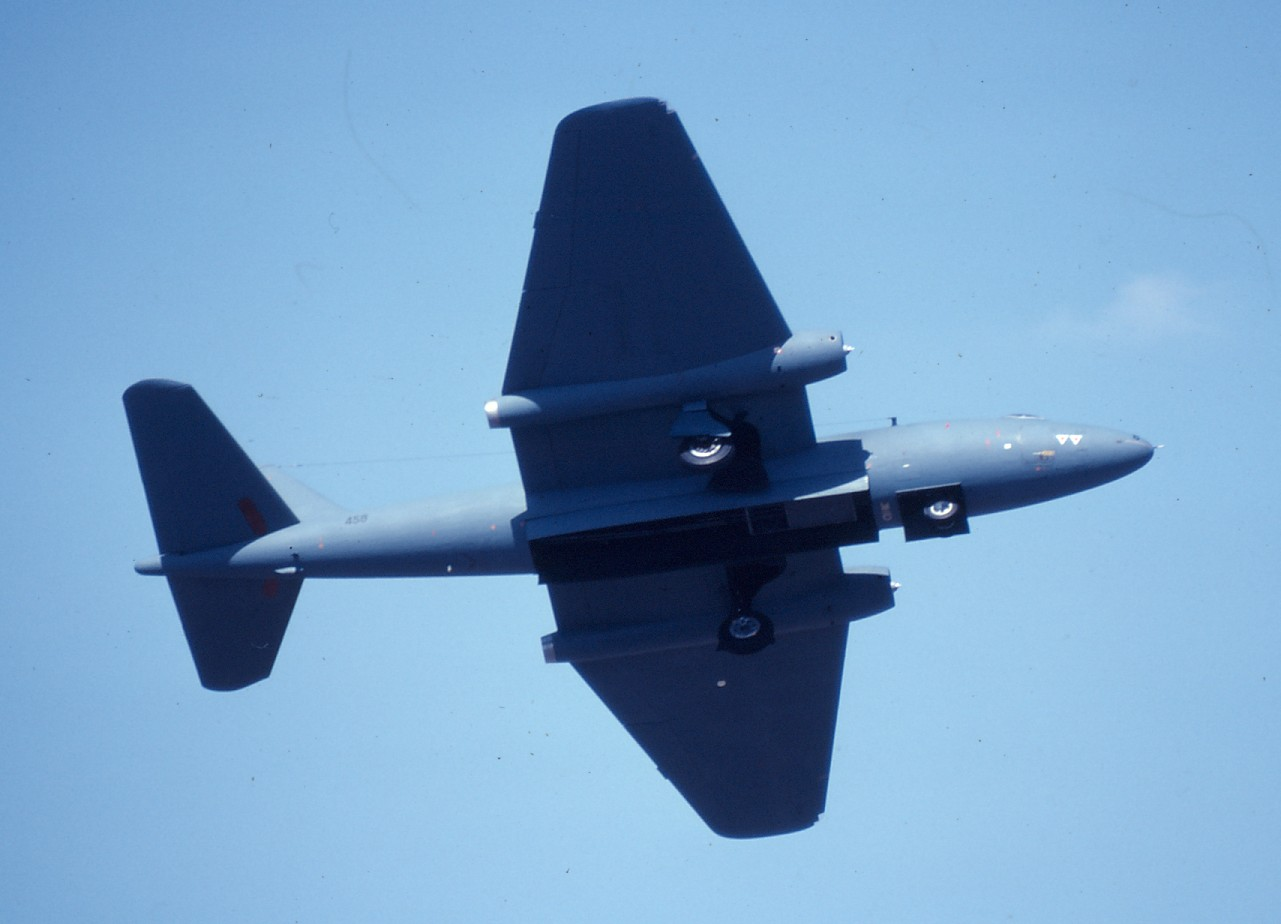
SAAF Canberra bomber

The first to move on the morning of the attack were the paratroopers of the Composite Para Bn, who got up at 04h00 and began fitting their weapons, equipment and parachutes.

At 05h19, the four Buccaneers bombers took off from AFB Waterkloof, followed at 05h43 by the faster Canberra. The heavily laden 'Buccs' could fly only at medium altitude, so their true airspeed (TAS) was considerably lower than that of the 'Cans', flying over 10,000 feet (3,000 m) higher. One of the Buccaneers went to an air force base nearer to the Angolan border in order to refuel and act as a close air support (CAS) aircraft, while the fifth aircraft of the Buccaneer strike force was delayed due to a brake problem, leaving four Buccaneers available for the initial strike.

At 06h00 the eight transport aircraft carrying the paratroopers became airborne. Two of the Transall C-160s, carrying the reserve company of 116 paratroopers, peeled off and entered a holding pattern just south of the border so as to be available to drop reinforcements during the battle. The remaining six transports continued on towards a holding point some miles east of Cassinga.

At about 06h30, the ELINT/EW Douglas DC-4 became airborne and settled into a holding pattern just south of the border. At the same time, a flight of two Puma helicopters, under the command of Major John Church, took off from 'a jungle night-stop' to fly to a clearing 22 km east of Cassinga in order to set up a Helicopter Administration Area (HAA), where the helicopters used in the operation could refuel. On board the two helicopters were Commandant James Kriel, the commander of the South African Air Force's Mobile Air Operations Team (MAOT) and his signaller, as well as Major James Hills, commander of Bravo Company, 1 Bn, along with one ten-man section from the two Hawk Groups he would be using to protect the HAA. Also in the two helicopters were six 200-litre drums of helicopter fuel, and, to the consternation of Hills, the Chief of the South African Army, Lieutenant-General Constand Viljoen.

The MAOT set up their radios and navigational beacons at the HAA, by now code-named Whisky-Three, and signalled the all-clear for the rest of the force, consisting of the rest of the Hawk Group protection element (31 paratroopers), six medical personnel, two more members of the MAOT and eighty-six 200-litre drums of helicopter fuel, all on board a fleet of five Super Frelon and ten Puma helicopters. The HAA was then completed, and the 17 helicopters refuelled and waited for the call to extract the paratroopers after the completion of the attack.

Also at around 07h00 the solitary Cessna C-185 took off and began flying towards Cassinga. Its role in the operation was to be an airborne observation post, giving the all-clear for the paratrooper drop, as well as being a radio-relay aircraft (known as "Telstar duty" in the SAAF). It would later be forced to withdraw due to sustained anti-aircraft fire. At around 07h50 two Mirage III fighter aircraft took off, heading straight for Cassinga.

==== Bombing runs ====
The defence-suppression bombing attack by the Canberras was two minutes late, occurring at 08h02 instead of 08h00 as originally planned, because the lead navigator failing to maintain effective timing-adjustment during the 200-nautical-mile (370 km) low-level approach phase. This made no difference to the intended effect. As the bombing had been timed to coincide with SWAPO's daily roll call on the parade ground, most of the people in the camp were assembled in the open when the Canberras initiated their low-level fragmentation bomb attack from the north. Each of the four Canberras – flying in loose 'line abreast' at 500 feet (150 m) and 300 knots – dropped 300 Rhodesian-designed "Alpha" fragmentation bombs, which were small 10-kilogram (22 lb) finless bombs like '10-Pin Bowling' balls, designed to bounce up to 10 metres (33 ft) into the air before detonating. A zone of some 800 metres by 500 metres was carpeted, each aircraft having its own 'bomb line'. The weapons were devastatingly effective against the assembled groupings below, causing most of SWAPO's casualties on the day, and also destroying vehicles, POL ("Petroleum Oil Lubricants", military acronym for flammable liquids) storage tanks and soft buildings.

Immediately after the Canberras came the Buccaneers, from the west, who flew their dive-bombing runs along a generally east–west axis. Photography from the cockpit of one of the aircraft showed the graphic lines of the preceding "Alpha" bomb strikes, was released to the SA press the following day. Of the total of thirty-two 1000 lb (450 kg) conventional bombs dropped by the four Buccaneers on the identified 'hard points', 24 scored direct hits, causing an immense amount of damage. Finally, the two Mirage IIIs conducted a strafing run on the target, using their 30 mm DEFA cannons. All the aircraft except for the solitary Buccaneer on CAS duty then flew back to air bases in South West Africa (Namibia) to refuel and re-arm to provide close air support if required – the Mirages to Ondangwa air force base, the Canberras, Buccaneers and C-130/C-160s to Grootfontein air force base, where their support teams and material had been ferried up from Pretoria during the morning. The Canberras and Buccaneers were used for a later strike on the Chetequera complex.

==== Parachute drop ====
After the attack aircraft had finished their bombing runs the six transports, which had been holding in wait to the east, commenced their formation run towards Cassinga at an altitude of 200 feet (60 m). Shortly before reaching the base, the six aircraft climbed to 600 feet (180 m), the drop height, and lined up for the drop. However, required visual 'tracking and distance' co-ordination markers were obscured by smoke from the bombing run, the drop zone (DZ) box scaling and drop point distances were incorrect – due to the reconnaissance scaling errors – and the drop was a shambles with nearly all the paratroopers being dropped off-target, some on the West side of the river and some into tall maize where they had problems linking up. The resultant confusion caused numerous delays, ruining the schedule of the 'drop-to-contact' plan, and much of the advantage of surprise. The disastrous drop also meant that it would be nearly an hour before C-Company was able to move into position on the eastern side of the camp and seal off the escape routes and as a result a number of top PLAN commanders, including Dimo Amaambo and Greenwell Matongo (two principal targets of the attack) escaped (with Amaambo later becoming the first head of the Namibian Defence Force in 1990).

The two independent rifle platoons, No. 9 and No. 11, were dropped quite accurately to the north. They immediately went into action, moving through a tented camp to the north-west of Cassinga, beyond the bombed areas. Resistance was fierce but short-lived, and a total of 54 bodies were counted by the platoons before they took up their position along the northern end of the base to seal off that escape route.

Of the four main paratrooper companies, D-Company had experienced the most accurate drop, though they were still 500 m from their intended drop zone. Regrouping quickly, they moved to attack structures which had been identified in the aerial reconnaissance photos as engineering buildings. However, during the assault on these buildings several of them exploded, perhaps due to ammunition stores within, injuring several paratroopers. There was also a brief blue-on-blue engagement as D-Company paratroopers were mistakenly fired upon by their fellow soldiers from B-Company, which by then had reached the base, but there were no casualties. After completing the assault of the engineer complex, D-Company moved south to set up a stop-line and prevent any guerrillas from escaping via that route. It also dispatched the anti-tank platoon to lay a tank ambush on the road to Techamutete.

=== 09h00 – 12h00 ===
By 09h00, A and B Companies had regrouped and were ready to commence the main assault on Cassinga. Instead of attacking eastwards as initially planned, the two companies attacked the base in a northerly direction. Initially, they encountered very little resistance, though this changed dramatically once the paratroopers neared the centre of the base. Heavy sniper fire was directed at the paratroopers from a number of trees inside the base, they were subjected to B-10 recoilless rifle fire, and some SWAPO guerrillas had regrouped, using houses as cover from which to fire at the paratroopers, critically wounding two paratroopers.

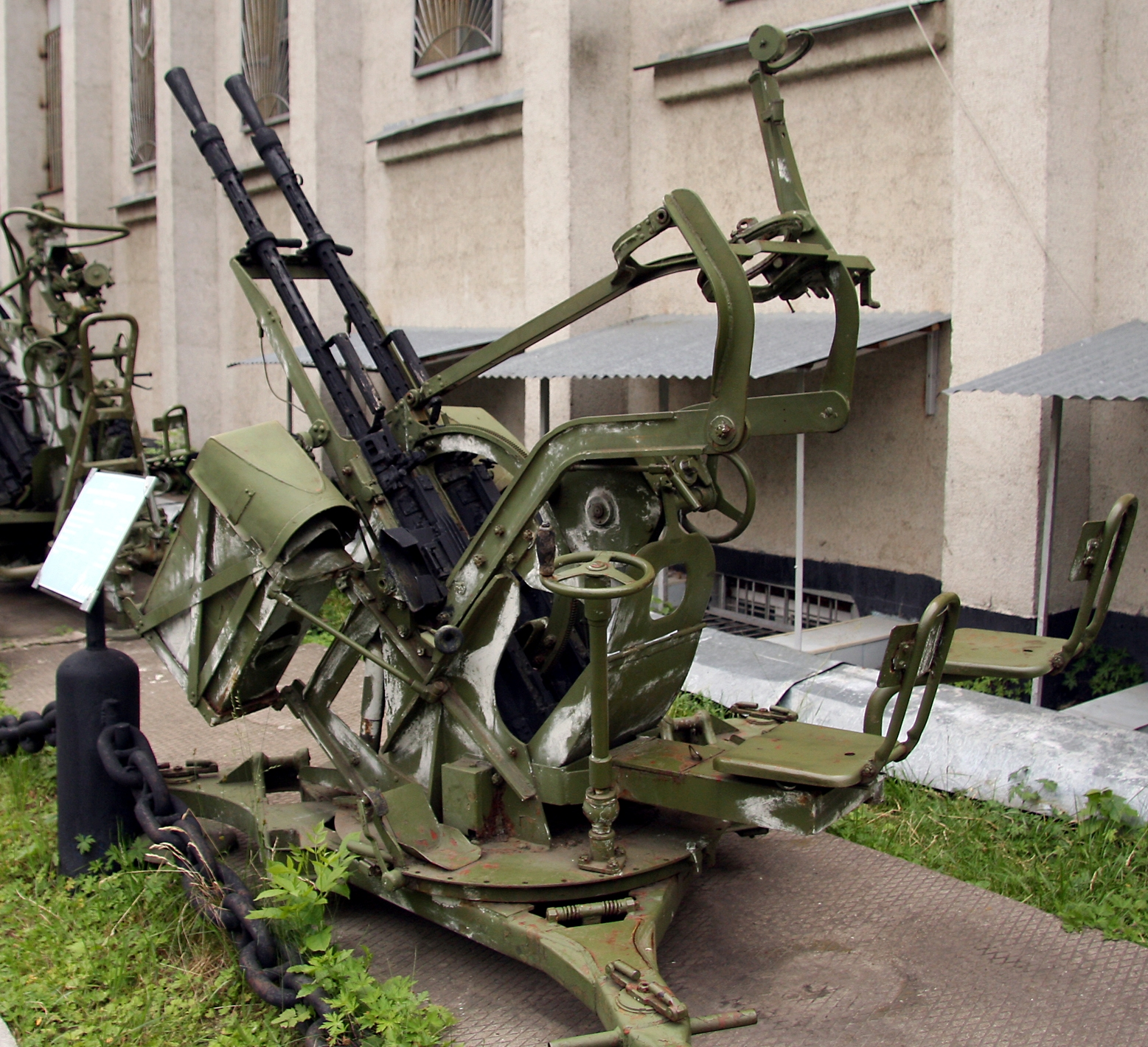
ZPU-2 anti-aircraft gun

However, the paratroopers faced their greatest challenge when they were fired upon by a number of ZPU-2 14.5 mm multi-barrel anti-aircraft guns used in the ground role. This brought both companies to a complete halt, as they were unable to move under the accurate, and close, fire of the guns, and the Buccaneer on CAS duty could not conduct a strike on the guns for fear of hitting the paratroopers close by.

In the end, Colonel Breytenbach ordered the commander of D-Company to take some men and work up towards the guns by attacking the trenches to the west of Cassinga. He also ordered the mortar platoon to begin attacking the guns.

Upon entering the trenches, the men from D-Company were surprised to find a number of civilians, whom they later asserted were being used as human shields by the guerrillas hiding inside. The guerrillas opened fire on the paratroopers, leading the paratroopers to enter what they described later as a mode of "kill or be killed", in which preventing the deaths of the civilians in the trenches was allegedly impossible. Though a number of civilians were killed in those trenches, as the paratroopers moved forward encountered less and less civilians until nearer the guns all those in the trenches, male and female, were wearing SWAPO's Cuban-style uniforms. In the meantime, 9 Platoon had entered the trenches from the north, though were making slow progress as they came under the attention of the gunners.

After a combination of the attack through the trenches and the mortar fire, the guns were silenced. The toll was an acceptable one for the South Africans; there were at least 95 SWAPO fighters dead inside the trenches and around the guns. Three paratroopers had been killed.

After the fall of the guns, all major resistance in Cassinga ended. The odd sniper and corners of light resistance were all that remained, and the mopping up process was soon finished. The paratroopers immediately set up the Bn HQ and Regimental Aid-Post (RAP) next to the SWAPO hospital, and began treating the worst of the injured. Overall, three paratroopers had been killed, and eleven wounded, two of them critically. In addition, a fourth paratrooper was found to be missing, presumed killed. It was later assumed that he had drowned after being dropped in the river during the parachute jump, or that his parachute had malfunctioned.

By now the attack was two hours behind schedule, with the first helicopter extractions having been planned for 10h00.

=== 12h00 – 15h00 ===
Brigadier Du Plessis at this time informed Colonel Breytenbach of a radio interception, indicating that the Cuban force at Techamutete was deploying. The SADF had been given explicit operational instructions to avoid conflict with the Cubans, but delays on the part of SADF now made that a distinct possibility. Brigadier Du Plessis insisted on extracting all the troops immediately, however Colonel Breytenbach wanted to secure the LZ first. A compromise was agreed whereby half the paratroopers would move to the LZ where 12 Puma helicopters would extract them, while the remainder would continue clearing operations, as well as to collect any and all documents of intelligence value.

At around 13h00, Colonel Breytenbach was informed by one of the Buccaneers on CAS duty that the Cuban mechanised battalion was moving up the road from Techamutete to Cassinga.

The Buccaneer had spotted an advancing column of around 30 assorted AFVs, APCs, T-34 tanks and other vehicles advancing slowly up the road from Techamutete. It immediately opened fire on the column, destroying three BTR-152 armoured personnel carriers in the process, but then had to return to Grootfontein air force base to re-arm and refuel, leaving about 200 of the remaining paratroopers temporarily unprotected. All that stood between them and the advancing armoured column were the 22 men of the anti-tank platoon, armed only with 10 RPG-7 rocket launchers and five anti-tank mines which they had planted in the road.

At this time however, there was a serious breakdown in the South Africans' command and control, and a number of fundamental errors were made. The shuttle of helicopters to and from Whiskey-Three, the HAA, as well as the order in which paratroopers were embarked, was improvised and initially uncoordinated and disorganised. It wasn't made initially clear to the commander of the helicopter extraction force quite what the problem – and the sudden urgency – was. Furthermore, two engineers, whose role was to destroy enemy equipment, departed in the first wave with all the demolition fuses before all the equipment had been disabled.

Meanwhile, the Cuban column advanced directly into the ambush that the paratroopers had set for them. The lead T-34 tank was destroyed by one of the anti-tank mines, while the paratroopers destroyed four of the BTR-152s using their RPG-7s. They also killed approximately 40 of the Cuban troops before making their 'fighting retreat' back along the road towards the Helicopter Landing Zone (HLZ) east of Cassinga where Breytenbach was organising the remaining paratroopers for final extraction. In the face of the oncoming armoured column, Breytenbach ordered a thin defensive line, but realised the lightly armed paratroopers stood little chance against the armoured vehicles and prepared to fall-back into the bush to an emergency LZ while calling urgently for air support.

The initial success of the SADF assault now looked like turning into a disaster with the imminent prospect of being overrun by Cuban armoured forces, 150 miles (240 km) into enemy territory. General Viljoen, who until this time had been wearing his rank and beret, removed and hid them.

At 14h20, when the Cuban AFVs were already in sight of the beleaguered paratroopers, a Buccaneer and two Mirage IIIs arrived overhead. An experienced Forward Air Controller (FAC) amongst the paratroopers began to direct the three aircraft in strikes against the advancing Cuban armour. The Mirage IIIs, with their 30 mm cannons, destroyed 10 BTR-152s before running low on fuel and returning to Ondangwa air force base. The Mirages' cannons were unable to destroy any tanks, but the sole Buccaneer destroyed at least two tanks, an anti-aircraft position and a number of other vehicles with its 68 mm SNEB air-to-ground rockets. The rockets had been omitted from the original Operation Order, but the Buccaneer Squadron Commander had fortuitously chosen to include them in the ordnance that was ferried to the Grootfontein forward air force base by C-130 Hercules, with his ground crews and maintenance spares. The Buccaneer pilot was being fired on continually by a towed 14.5 mm anti-aircraft gun, at which he had to make two passes before he was able to destroy it with rockets.

The Buccaneer ran out of ammunition at this point, but this coincided with the arrival of the 17 helicopters to extract the remaining paratroopers in the second wave. The helicopters' arrival betrayed the position of the LZ to the remaining Cuban forces, who began to advance on the area. While unable to see the armoured vehicles, the paratroopers could hear their engines and gunfire, and could see trees being flattened in their path barely 200 metres (660 ft) away. In a desperate attempt to prevent the Cuban tanks from firing at the vulnerable helicopters and the assembling SA troops waiting to be picked up, the Buccaneer pilot dived his aircraft dangerously low, nearly hitting trees as he flew close over the top of the tanks in mock attacks, disorienting the crews and forcing them to break off their developing attack on the Parabats' positions. There were several holes in the airframe, including one on the armoured front visor glass, needing swift patching by groundcrew after landing, refuelling and re-arming.

Because of the disorganisation with the first wave of helicopters, there was nearly not enough space for all the remaining paratroopers and prisoners on the second wave. In the ensuing chaos and panic to scramble aboard the helicopters, 40 SWAPO prisoners, intended to be taken back to South West Africa for interrogation, had to be released to lighten the aircraft. Some excess equipment and ammunition was also dumped from the overloaded helicopters. A final barrage of fire from the paratroopers stalled the closing Cuban armour just sufficiently long enough to complete the extraction of the assembled paratroops.

However ten minutes after taking off, two of the Puma helicopters were directed to return to Cassinga, as it was feared that some of the paratroopers might have been left behind. They spotted a group of people huddled together, but closer inspection revealed that they were the prisoners who had been left behind. The helicopters flew a total of four low passes looking for paratroopers, when one of the helicopter pilots spotted a Cuban tank appearing from the bushes. He warned the other Puma pilot, who was able to bank away just in time so that the tank round missed the aircraft. No paratroopers were found and the two Pumas returned to the HAA. The dismantling of the HAA continued throughout the rest of the day.

=== 15h00 – 18h00 ===
At 15h00, one of the Mirage IIIs returned to Cassinga, and once again strafed the Cuban vehicles that were still on the road, setting at least one of them alight. It was replaced at 15h30 by another aircraft and a Buccaneer which proceeded to destroy more of the vehicles and a building. About a kilometre south of Cassinga, the Buccaneer attacked another column of vehicles, coming under heavy anti-aircraft fire in the process.

Another Buccaneer arrived at 16h45, surprised some Cubans moving through the ruins and destroyed a T-34 tank and some anti-aircraft guns in the process, while further Mirage and Buccaneer strikes at 17h10 and 18h35 destroyed another tank and other equipment.

The result was that by nightfall nearly the entire Cuban battalion had been destroyed, killing around 150 Cuban soldiers, accounting for that country's biggest single-day casualty rate during its military involvement in Angola.

A complete Angolan tank brigade relief force, arriving at dusk, was too late to have any impact and found only scenes of destruction at what had once been Cassinga.

== Aftermath ==
According to an Angolan government white paper, the official toll of the Cassinga Raid was a total of 624 dead and 611 injured civilians as well as combatants. Among the dead were 167 women and 298 teenagers and children. Since many of the combatants were female or teenagers and many combatants did not wear uniforms, the exact number of civilians among the dead could not be established. A secret report to the SWAPO Central Committee listed 582 dead and 400 wounded.

The South Africans declared the attack on Cassinga to be a great military success, even though disaster was so closely averted by the intervention of the SAAF, and in the face of a SWAPO propaganda campaign that labelled the event a massacre. Despite inflicting heavy casualties, the SADF did not kill or capture Dimo Amaambo or any other senior SWAPO leaders. The SADF casualties were low for such an attack, an important factor in South Africa where the public was intolerant of high casualty rates: Three soldiers were killed, one was missing in action presumed dead (landed in river, failed to emerge), and eleven were wounded.

According to General Constand Viljoen, Cassinga set the strategy for the SADF for the next ten years, i.e. that of launching pre-emptive strikes at SWAPO inside Angola, even though subsequent actions would be armoured rather than air assaults.

SWAPO launched Operation Revenge, a retaliatory bombardment of Katima Mulilo in the Caprivi Strip on 23 August 1978, during which 10 soldiers were killed and 10 injured as a result of a direct hit on their barracks by an 82 mm mortar bomb. Sixteen guerrillas were killed in a SADF follow-up operation 250 kilometres (160 mi) into Zambia.

== Political consequences ==
One of the mass graves at Cassinga

According to General Geldenhuys the raid was a "jewel of military craftmanship", but politically it was a disaster for the apartheid regime. A media campaign had been carefully prepared well in advance of the operation and media releases managed in order to create an impression that SADF intervention was at the request of the SWA administration, and to counter negative reports on South African military actions and claims of killing innocent civilians. This campaign included the fabrication and distortion of SWAPO actions. One of the parachute battalions was specifically tasked to take photographs and instructed to focus on images supporting the South African cause; bodies were only to be photographed with weapons by their side. Negative images, such as suffering victims, were to be avoided. Nevertheless, in spite of these instructions, pictures of bodies without weapons and of dead SADF paratroopers were taken. (Note: SADF photographs by Mike McWilliams included pictures of bodies without weapons, and pictures of dead SADF paratroopers.)

The Angolans were first to publish details of the attack, followed shortly thereafter by SWAPO press statements that supported and elaborated on the Angolan account. They described the base as a refugee camp and claimed the SADF had slaughtered 600 defenceless refugees. The bodies were buried in two mass graves at Cassinga; pictures of one of the mass graves was used extensively for propaganda purposes, and for many people therefore became the imagery that they associated with the event.

The position of SWAPO and all the organizations and governments that were supporting it by 1978 benefited from the moral outrage incited by a "surprise attack" on a "refugee camp". In the aftermath of the raid, SWAPO received unprecedented support in the form of humanitarian aid sent to its exile camps and offers from governments to educate Namibians in their countries.

The debate over whether Cassinga was a military camp or a refugee camp (or both) continues to rage. Weapons and military installations were present and documented at the camp. In 1998 the South African Truth and Reconciliation Commission also concluded that

It is clear that from the SADF's perspective, Kassinga (Note: The original Portuguese name used the spelling "Cassinga", while SWAPO used the spelling "Kassinga".) was a military facility rather than essentially a refugee camp or refugee transit facility, as SWAPO has always claimed. The photographic evidence shown to the Commission at the SADF archives suggests a military dimension to the camp. This cannot, however, be taken as conclusive evidence that Kassinga was a military base. In the context of the ongoing war in Angola, some defensive fortification of any SWAPO facility, whether civilian or military, would have been standard practice

The United Nations invited SWAPO-leader Sam Nujoma to address the council before issuing United Nations Security Council Resolution 428 on 6 May condemning South Africa for "the armed invasion of Angola carried out on 4 May 1978". The Council condemned apartheid and the continued occupation of Southwest Africa and commended Angola for its support of the Namibian people.

US President Jimmy Carter told reporters "They've claimed to have withdrawn and have not left any South African troops in Angola. So we hope it's just a transient strike in retaliation, and we hope it's all over".

After independence, the new government of Namibia declared 4 May as "Cassinga Day", a public holiday to commemorate the loss of life during the raid. In 2007, the names of the Cuban soldiers who were killed were carved into the wall of Freedom Park in South Africa.

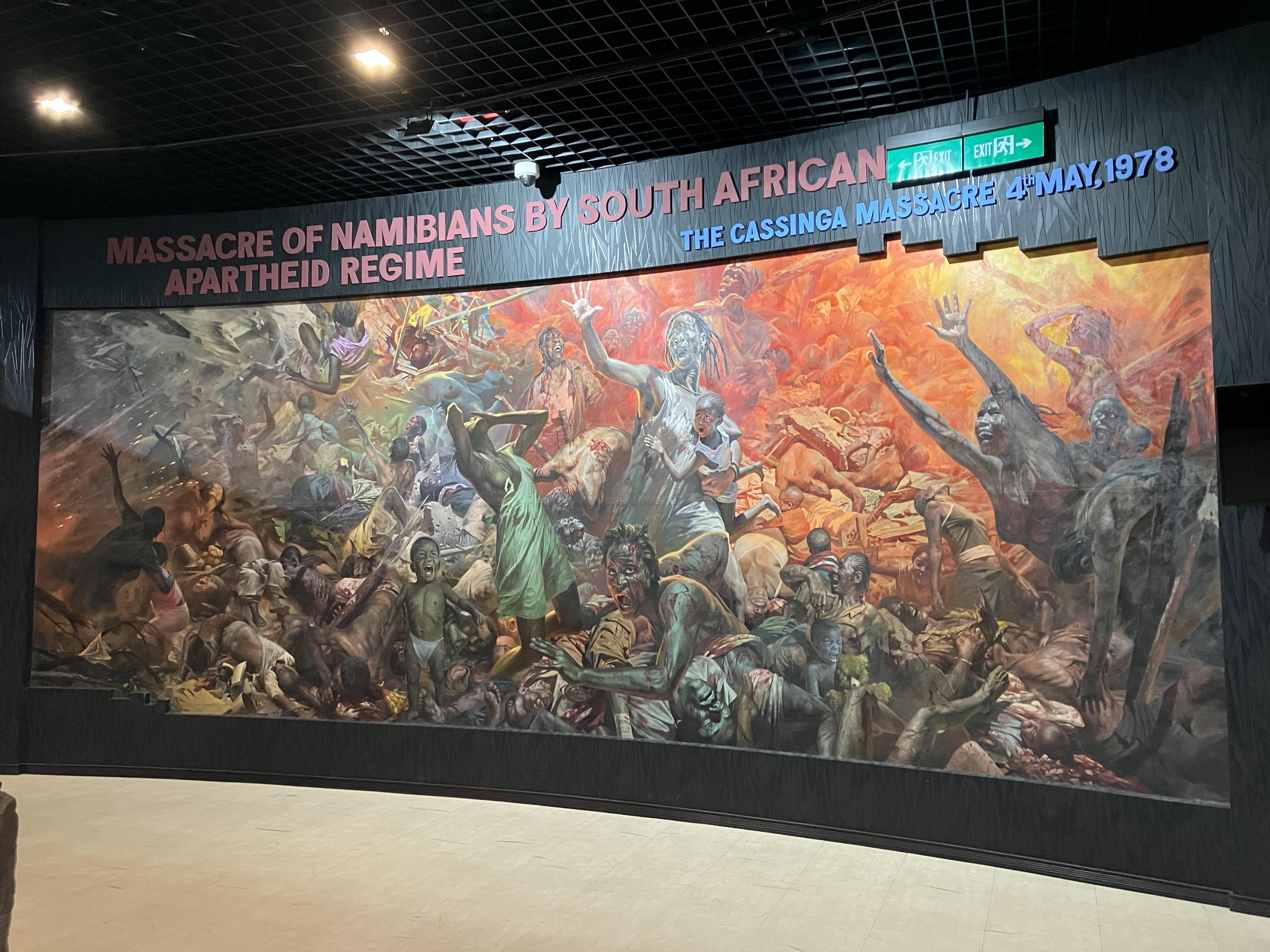
Depiction of the Cassinga massacre at the Namibian Independence Memorial Museum.

Official celebration of this event by the SANDF ended only in 1996, two years after Nelson Mandela was elected president. Veterans of the various South African parachute battalions still privately celebrate Cassinga Day in remembrance both of the extent of the victory and of those who died that day.

== Notable survivors ==
- Ella Kamanya
- Monica Nashandi
- Dimo Hamaambo

== See also ==
- List of operations of the South African Border War
- Operation Eland
- Operation Vanity

== General references ==
- Baines, Gary (18 February 2008). "The Battle for Cassinga: Conflicting Narratives and Contested Meanings" (PDF). Rhodes University. Archived from the original (PDF) on 18 July 2011.
- "Battle of Cassinga Still Rages". The Star. 19 May 2007.
- Heywood, Annemarie (1994). The Cassinga Event: An Investigation of the Records. National Archives of Namibia. ISBN 978-0-86976-350-6.
- Dzinesa, Gwinyayi; Rupiya, Martin (20 October 2005). "Promoting National Reconciliation and Regional Integration: The Namibian Defence Force from 1990 to 2005" (PDF). Evolutions & Revolutions: A Contemporary History of Militaries in Southern Africa. Institute for Security Studies. Archived from the original (PDF) on 27 February 2008.
- Geldenhuys, Jannie (1995). A General's Story: From an Era of War and Peace. Jonathan Ball. ISBN 1868420205.
- McGill Alexander, Edward (July 2003). The Cassinga Raid (PDF) (MA). UNISA.
- "Let's Review Our National Holidays". The Namibian. 27 April 2007.
- Truth and Reconciliation Commission (29 October 1998). "Truth and Reconciliation Commission of South Africa Report" (PDF). Department of Justice, South Africa. Archived from the original (PDF) on 4 November 2009.
- Shigwedha, Vilho Amukwaya (December 2011). Enduring Suffering: The Cassinga Massacre of Namibian Exiles in 1978 and the Conflicts Between Survivors' Memories and Testimonies (PDF) (PhD). University of the Western Cape. Archived from the original (PDF) on 23 December 2018.
- Smillie, Shaun (7 May 2012). "Cassinga Riddle Lingers 34 Years on". The Star.
- Steenkamp, Willem (1983). Borderstrike! South Africa into Angola 1975–1980. Just Done Productions. ISBN 1-920169-00-8.
- Williams, Christian A. (2009). Exile History: An Ethnography of the SWAPO Camps and the Namibian Nation (PDF) (PhD). University of Michigan.
