= 101 Battalion (South Africa) =

35/101 Battalion
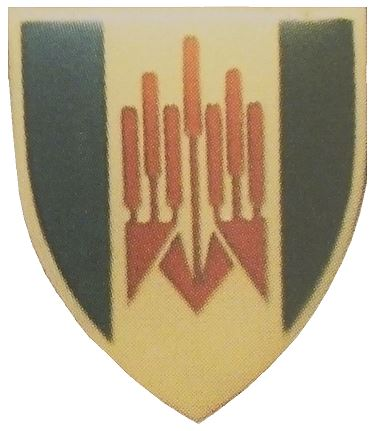
- SWATF 101 Battalion emblem
- Active: 1976-1989
- Disbanded: 1989
- Country: South West Africa, South Africa
- Allegiance: South Africa
- Branch: South African Army,
- Type: Motorised Infantry
- Part of: South West African Territorial Force
- Garrison/HQ: Ondangwa, Etale, Rundu (17°57′55″S 19°43′56″E)
- Equipment: Casspir, Buffalo, Kwêvoël and Bedford Trucks
- Engagements: South African Border War; Operation Reindeer (1979)(elements of); Operation Rekstok (1979) (elements of); Operation Sceptic (1980) (elements of); Operation Daisy (1981)(elements of); Operation Askari (1983/4)(elements of); Operation Afskeur (1983); Operation Zepplin (1985); Operation Egret (1985); Operation Cinema (1986); Operation Tremour (1986); Operation Pynappel (1987); Operation Moduler (1987); Operation Firewood (1987)

Commanders
- Colonel of the Regiment: Commandant Welgemoed

Insignia
- Part of the South West African Territorial Force

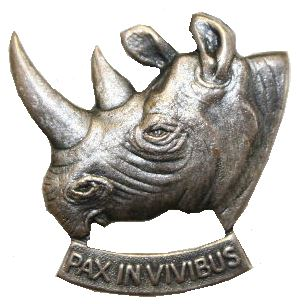
- SWATF 101 Battalion beret badge

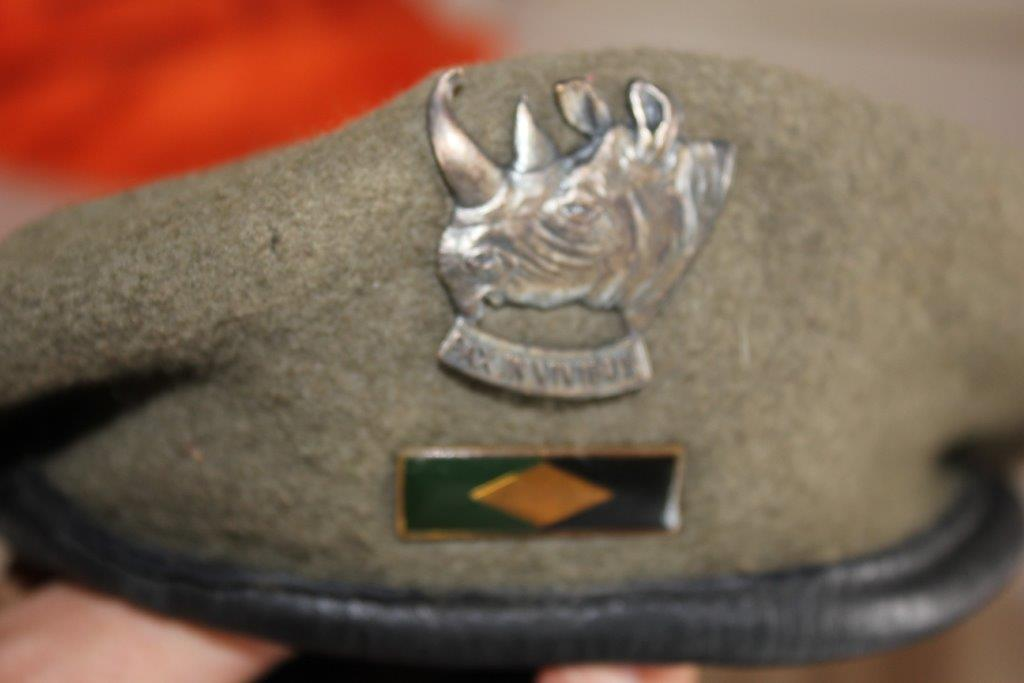
- 101 Battalion Beret showing Unit Badge and Infantry Bar

101 Battalion (pronounced as one-o-one Battalion) was a quick-reaction unit of the South West African Territorial Force, composed of black and white commissioned and enlisted personnel.

== History ==
=== Origin ===
The unit was formed in January 1976 as 1 Owambo Battalion, renamed to 35 Battalion in January 1978, 35 Battalion recruited exclusively among the Owambo. and were only given basic training, but this changed after 1978 when the training intensified with an emphasis on rural counterinsurgency operations.

=== Renaming ===
The South West Africa Territory Force, SWATF renumbered battalion numbers according to their geographical positioning on the border. The prefix 10 pertained to battalions operating to the west of the Kavango River, 20 to the Kavango or central region and 70 to the eastern region. Under this system, 35 Battalion was renamed 101 Battalion in 1980.

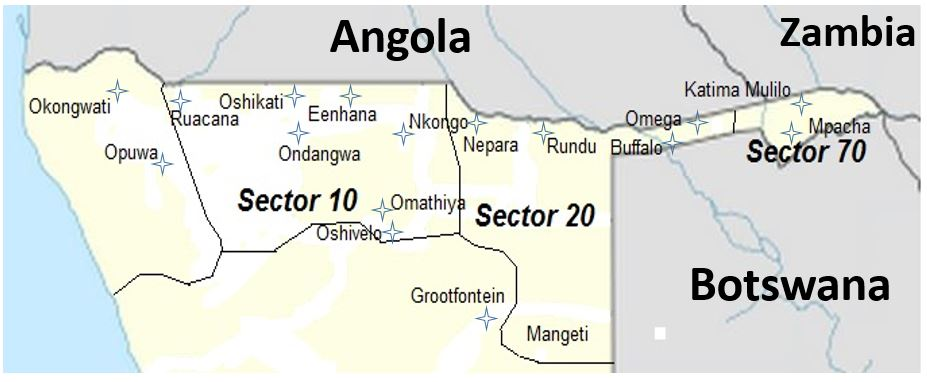
SWATF Northern Sector Map

=== Tracking ===
Until 1980 101 battalion was used as small teams attached to SADF units as trackers and interpreters.

=== Light Infantry ===
By 1981 101 converted to a light infantry battalion.

By 1983 at least 2700 men had been recruited and trained, many converted SWAPO insurgents.

=== Introduction of the Romeo Mike Concept ===
A significant development in 101's operations occurred during 1982 with the adaption of Koevoet tactics to a military context. The Reaction Force concept or Romeo Mike developed into two Special Service Companies (901 and 903) in 1984 and a further two (902 and 904) by 1985. Their purpose was to relentlessly track and surround exhausted insurgents. Once a track was detected, elements of a team would dismount from a Casspir and follow the track at a run with the remainder of the team rested and following in the Casspir, and swapping over with the runners frequently, thus sustaining a fast pursuit of the insurgents. When contact was made, the full team with Casspir would charge in. The Romeo Mikes's other three Casspirs would be close of each other and would also react.

=== Structure ===
101 Battalion consisted of:

- a HQ,
- a support company,
- a light workshop,
- a training wing,
- Special service companies, translating Police tracking concepts to suit Army operations:
  - 901 and
  - 903 Special Service Companies.

These Companies concentrated on external operations and pursuit of infiltrators. Another two reaction force companies was activated, and

- a Reconnaissance Wing.

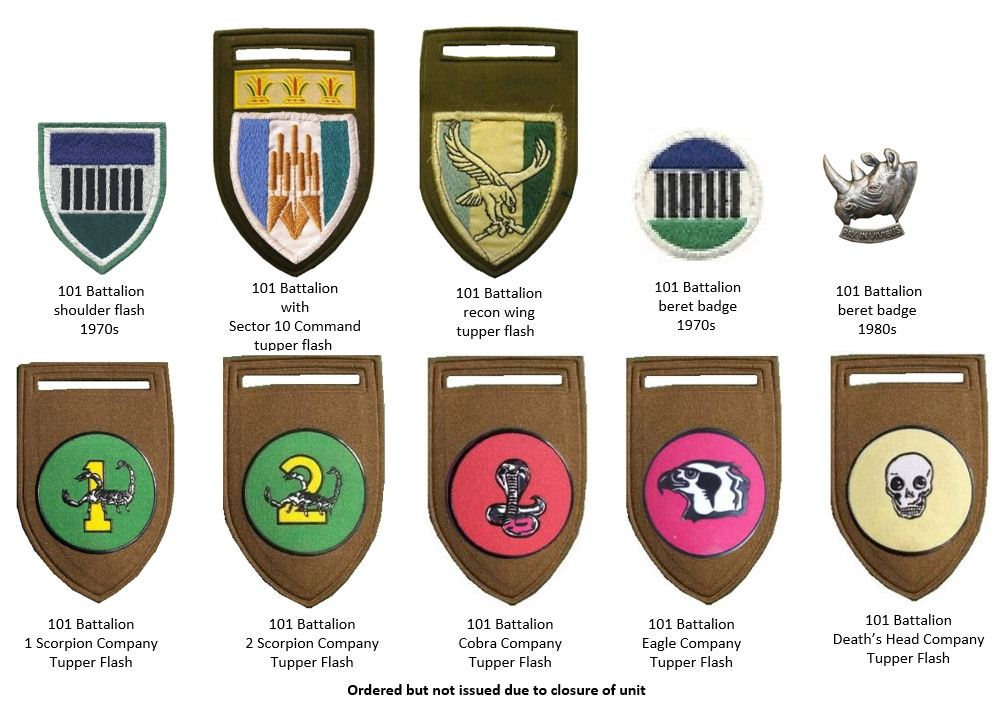
SWATF era 101 Battalion insignia

=== Equipment ===
Each team in a company had:

- 4 X Casspirs
- 1 X Kwêvoël 50
- 2 X Hispano Suiza 20mm cannons,
- 6 X 50 cal Browning machine guns
- 4 X Light machine guns and
- 4 X 60mm patrol mortars

=== Engagements ===
101 Battalions reaction force teams averaged about 200 contacts annually. By 1985 101 Battalion fought under its own command instead of being detached to external units.

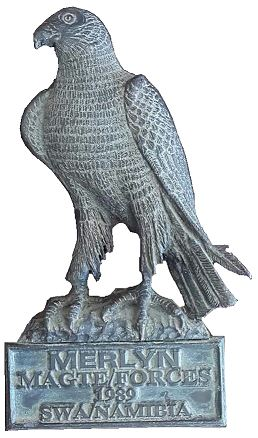
101 Battalion was part of the Sector 10 response to the Cuban buildup and SWAPO incursions, known as the Merlyn Forces in 1989 South West Africa

=== Disbandment ===
101 Battalion was disbanded on 30 June 1989 upon the independence of Namibia in 1990-91.

101 Battalion's Colours and Standard were finally laid up in the unit church of 5 Reconnaissance Regiment on 10 April 1990.

== Leadership ==
Leadership
From	Colonel of the Regiment	To	Ribbon
	Cmdt W.H. Welgemoed		
From	Officer Commanding	To	Ribbon
1981	Cmdt W.H. Welgemoed	c. 1988	
1988	Col L. Marais	c. 1988	
1988	Col L. Kotze	c. 1989	
From	Regimental Sergeant Major	To	Ribbon
c. 1985	WO1 C. Schutte	c. Nd	

== See also ==
- South African Border War
