= Ella Kamanya =

Namibian politician and businesswoman (1961–2005)

Ella Ndatega Kamanya
- Born: 9 November 1961; Onangalo, Ovamboland
- Died: July 31, 2005 (aged 43); Windhoek, Namibia
- Occupations: Politician, Businesswoman
- Known for: Survivor of the Battle of Cassinga; Member of the Pan-African Parliament
- Title: Member of the National Assembly of Namibia (2003–2005)
- Political party: SWAPO

Ella Ndatega Kamanya (9 November 1961 – 31 July 2005) was a Namibian politician and businesswoman. She joined the South West Africa People's Organization (SWAPO) in exile in 1978 and survived the Battle of Cassinga during the conflict with the South African Army.

Kamaya was appointed to the National Assembly of Namibia in 2003, replacing Hage Geingob. In March 2004, she was appointed to the Pan-African Parliament.

== Early life ==
Kamanya was born on 9 November 1961 in Onangalo, Uukwaluudhi Kingdom, Ovamboland. Her father was a prominent local politician and businessperson. She grew up in a devout Christian family.

== Career ==
In 1978, she joined SWAPO in exile, and shortly after arriving in Cassinga, Angola, the encampment where she and other Namibian exiles and refugees were based was raided by the South African Defence Force. She was captured during the May 1978 Battle of Cassinga, returned to South-West Africa, and subsequently incarcerated in Oshakati.

A businesswoman by profession, Kamanya ran movie theaters in Ongwediva and Ondangwa before joining the National Assembly. She requested to be buried in northern Namibia.

=== Controversy ===
In March 2004, Kamanya faced criticism for alleged graft in deals related to Black Economic Empowerment transactions and the San community of Namibia. She denied the allegations and died in July 2005.
