= Baia (disambiguation) =

Baia is a commune in Suceava County, Romania.

Baia may also refer to :

== Places ==
=== Africa ===
- Baia, Numidia, Roman Empire, an ancient former city and bishopric, now a Latin catholic titular see
- Baía, Angola, town near Luanda
- Baía, Cape Verde, village on Santiago island

=== Europe ===
==== Romania ====
- Baia, Tulcea, a commune in Tulcea County
- Baia, a village in Vărădia de Mureș Commune, Arad County
- Baia Mare, a city in Maramureș County
- Baia de Aramă, a town in Mehedinţi County
- Baia de Arieș, a town in Alba County
- Baia Sprie, a town in Maramureș County
- Baia de Criș, a commune in Hunedoara County
- Baia de Fier, a commune in Gorj County
- Baia Nouă, a village in Dubova Commune, Mehedinţi County
- Baia (Tisza), a river in Maramureș County

==== Elsewhere in Europe ====
- Bayas (river), Spain
- Baiae, Italy
- (in Vampire Academy) Baia, a fictional Dhampir commune located in Omsk, Russia

== Other uses ==
- Vítor Baía, retired Portuguese footballer
- "Na Baixa do Sapateiro", a 1938 Brazilian song by Ary Barroso which was retitled "Baía" (also "Bahia") for the 1944 Disney film The Three Caballeros and was covered by various artists, such as Crosby, Kostelanetz, Pleis, Thornhill, Valente, Eça, Coltrane, Mann, Baker, Davis, Faith, Los Panchos, Jamal, Lincoln / de Havana, Getz, Como, Wanderley, Barbieri, Catalyst, Ritchie, Muhammad, Schifrin, Santana, Alpert, Blake, Almeida, Denny, Prado, Torme, Mathis, Warwick, Domingo, Montoliu, Santamaria, Lyman, Blacktop, Esquivel, Shore, Barenboim, and others

== See also ==
- Bahia (disambiguation), in some cases pronounced identically
