= Bungo, Luanda =

Coordinates: 8°48′19″S 13°14′40″E

Bungo is a bairro of Luanda, the capital city of Angola. It is the site of the principal passenger terminus of the Luanda Railway. In 2013, work began on doubling the railway track from Bungo station to Baía.

== See also ==
- Railway stations in Angola
