= Omashaka massacre =

Massacre in 1981

- Location: Omashaka, South West Africa
- Date: March 27, 1981
- Attack type: Mass murder
- Weapon: Assault rifle
- Deaths: 8
- Injuries: 12

The Omashaka massacre was a mass murder that occurred in Omashaka, a village five miles north of Ondangwa in Ovamboland, South West Africa on March 27, 1981, when a black soldier killed eight people and wounded twelve others, two of them seriously, before being arrested.

The 18-year-old soldier, a member of the 101 Battalion, was reported to have shot at shoppers in a trading or liquor store, and at people sitting in front of their huts with an assault rifle, killing three soldiers and five women, and wounding two other soldiers and ten civilians.

== Bibliography ==
- United Nations Economic and Social Council; 1981. (p. 470)
- König, Barbara: Namibia: The Ravages of War; International Defence & Aid Fund for Southern Africa, 1983. (p. 44)
- Gorbunov, Iuriĭ Ivanovich: Namibia, a Struggle for Independence; Progress Publishers, 1988. (p. 11)
