= Jamba, Huíla =

Town and municipality in Huíla, Angola

Jamba
- Municipality
- Location in Angola
- Coordinates: 14°42′S 16°04′E
- Country: Angola
- Province: Huíla

Area
  - Municipality: 11,200 km^{2} (4,300 sq mi)

Population (2014 Census)
  - Municipality: 105,090
  - Density: 11/km^{2} (28/sq mi)
  - Urban: 12,000
- Time zone: UTC+1 (WAT)
- Climate: Cwa

Jamba is a town and a municipality, with a population of 105,090 (2014 census), in the province of Huíla, Angola.

== Administrative subdivisions ==
The municipality of Jamba comprises three communes as follows

- Jamba, the seat of the municipality
- Cassinga
- Dongo

== Transport ==
=== Rail ===
Jamba is served by the terminus of a short branch railway of the southern line of the national railway system.

=== Air ===
There is an airport in Jamba, (IATA: JMB).

== See also ==
- Railway stations in Angola
