= Operation Saffraan =

- Part of the South African Border War
- Location: Zambia Operation Saffraan (Zambia)
- Target: Various PLAN bases
- Date: March 1979 duration 5 weeks

Operation Saffraan (English: Operation Safron) was a series of South African Defence Force raids from the Caprivi Strip area during the South African Border War. On 23 August 1978 PLAN and the Zambian army shelled the small South African garrison town Katimo Mulilo in eastern Caprivi (Namibia). In March 1979, South African forces entered south-western Zambia attacking PLAN bases in retaliation for the shelling of Katimo Mulilo. These bases were around Sinjembele and the Njinje forest, were found to have been vacated but the facilities were destroyed disrupting future border infiltrations. The raid into Zambia resulted in SWAPO being asked to leave the country. Conducted on 7 March 1979 concurrently with Operation Rekstok; it followed Operation Reindeer and preceded Operation Sceptic.

== See also ==
- Angolan Civil War

Preceded by Operation Reindeer	Battles and operations of the South African Border War; March 1979	Succeeded by Operation Sceptic
