= Cuto =

Cuto may refer to:

== People ==
- Procopio Cutò (1651–1727), Italian chef

== Places ==
- Cuto, Angola

== Other ==
- Cuto (comic)
