= Ferrangol =

Ferrangol is a state owned corporation that manages iron ore production in Angola. Formed in 1981 to manage the Cassinga mines in partnership with a private firm, mining operations was impeded as a result of the Angolan Civil War. The company hopes to resume production in 2017. Ferrangol's role has expanded to include management of gold, manganese, non-ferrous, precious and rare earth metals concessions.

The firm manages three major concessions, iron ore in Cassinga, Huíla Province and manganese and gold in Cassala-Quitungo region.
