= Operation Firewood =

Military operation of the South African Defence Force in 1987

Coordinates: 14°49′21″S 16°15′37″E

- Part of the South African Border War
- Location: Angola Operation Firewood (Angola)
- Objective: An attack on PLAN's on Northern Command base.
- Date: 31 October 1987

Operation Firewood was a 1987 cross-border military operation conducted by the South African Defence Force (SADF) against the armed wing of SWAPO, the People's Liberation Army of Namibia (PLAN), during the later phases of the South African Border War.

== Background ==
The PLAN Northern Command base was 35 km north of the town of Techamutete, Angola at a place called Indungo. A SADF battle group was formed and consisted of elements of 1 Parachute Battalion, 5 Reconnaissance Regiment, 2 Reconnaissance Regiment and 101 Battalion. This battle group would be a mechanised force and consisted of Ratels, Casspirs and Buffels.

== Order of battle ==
=== South African and South West Africa Territorial Forces ===
- 101 Battalion
- elements - 1 Parachute Battalion
- elements - 5 Reconnaissance Regiment
- elements - 2 Reconnaissance Regiment

== Battle ==
The attack occurred on 31 October 1987. The PLAN base, set in a densely wooded area, was attacked from the west by special forces ("recce's") and paratroopers ("Parabats") of the SADF, while 101 Battalion covered the base from north, east and south, the direction PLAN forces were expected to flee. The fighting was said to be intense lasting seven hours with PLAN putting up a fight against the SADF. The base was not successfully taken by the SADF forces, who withdrew when PLAN reinforcements were understood to be on their way.

== Aftermath ==
The South African forces are said to have incurred 15 killed and 65 wounded, while other sources say it was as high as 19 killed and 64 wounded. On the SWAPO side, the casualties were said to be high too with at least 150 PLAN soldiers killed. Honoris Crux medals were awarded to five 101 Battalion members for gallantry in action.

== Analysis ==
Operation Firewood occurred concurrently with the Battle of Cuito Cuanavale and has been largely overlooked by modern South African military scholars. The operation was notable both for the relatively high casualties suffered by the SADF and for the fact that it marked the last time that a major South African cross border operation was undertaken against a SWAPO-dominated formation. Despite inflicting heavy casualties against the defenders, the South Africans were also unable to achieve their primary objective of neutralising the SWAPO base.

In the aftermath of the engagement, the SADF conducted an internal evaluation of Operation Firewood in preparation for potential future cross-border raids. The review identified a number of shortcomings with the operational plan and included criticism of the utilisation of relatively soft-skinned Casspirs against defenders armed with anti-tank weaponry.
