= Cassinga =

- Commune and town
- Location in Angola
- Coordinates: 15°06′47.4″S 16°06′08.8″E
- Country: Angola
- Province: Huíla
- Municipality: Jamba
- Time zone: UTC+1 (WAT)

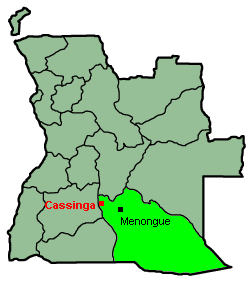

Cassinga or Kassinga (Note: The transliteration Kassinga is also commonly used, with the "K" being an adoption of the original Portuguese terminology either by German and Afrikaans-speaking miners, or by indigenous people in whose language the letter "K" is also common. Municipal sources continue to use the older spelling.) is a town and commune in the municipality of Jamba, province of Huíla, Angola.

It is situated on an old and important two-track road from Jamba to Huambo.

Established as an ore mine and during the Civil War allegedly used as Namibian guerrilla training site and refugee camp, the place was the scene of the Battle of Cassinga, an airborne raid by the South African Defence Force against the People's Liberation Army of Namibia on 4 May 1978 that killed several hundred SWAPO fighters, Cuban soldiers and Namibian refugees.

The settlement is a place of reverence and pilgrimage by both belligerents of the battle. Namibians celebrate Cassinga Day as a national holiday. SWAPO and the MPLA claimed the battle was a massacre of a refugee camp. The battle is thus regarded the turning point in the fight for Namibian independence, which then started drawing support from a wider segment of the population. Some South Africans, mostly those who fought in the battle, and their families, celebrate a "jewel of military craftmanship". These people pay respect to those who died in the battle, by visiting the town. No major commemorations or celebrations are held by the general South African public, of all races.

== History ==
=== Before Independence ===
One of the exploratory travels of the Dorsland Trek crossed Cassinga in 1874. There is still a monument remembering those trekboere that died during that trip.

Located near the site is an old iron mine constructed by Krupp engineers working in concert with the colonial administration. Between 1966 and 1967, a second terminal for extracting the ore was completed at Saco, a bay just 12 kilometres north of Moçâmedes by Compania Mineira do Lobito, the Lobito Mining Company. Cassinga's product would eventually be channeled to Saco under direction of Portuguese authorities. Development of the installation was trusted to Krupp and SETH, a Portuguese subsidiary of Denmark's Højgaard & Schultz. Moçâmedes housed expatriate workers, the foreign engineers, and their families for two years until the first 250,000 tons of ore were shipped out in 1967. At that time Cassinga had about twenty buildings serving as warehouses, accommodation and offices.

=== During the Civil War ===
Cassinga continued to thrive until Angola's independence from Portugal in 1975. Abandoned by its European supervisors, the mine and the settlement quickly fell into neglect during the ensuing Angolan Civil War. It is located about halfway from Huambo to the South-West African border where the People's Liberation Army of Namibia (PLAN), the military wing of the South West African People's Organization (SWAPO), launched guerrilla attacks. After using the ghost town as a stopover point for a few weeks, a PLAN squad led by Dimo Hamaambo occupied the place. Not long after the establishment of the PLAN camp at Cassinga, it began to function also as a transit camp for Namibian exiles. The Angolan government allocated the abandoned village to SWAPO in 1976 to cope with the influx of thousands of refugees from South-West Africa, estimated in May 1978 to total 3,000 to 4,000 people.

UNICEF reported of a "well-run and well-organized" camp but "ill-equipped" to cope with the rapid refugee increase in early 1978. The Cubans, who set up a base at nearby Techamutete when they intervened in the war in 1975, provided logistical support to the SWAPO administration at Cassinga. According to SADF intelligence, "Logistic planning and the provision of supplies, weapons and ammunition to insurgents operating in central and eastern Ovamboland were undertaken from Cassinga. Medical treatment of the seriously wounded as well as the repair of equipment and the assembly of newly trained insurgents on their way to bases in the East and West Cunene Provinces all took place in Cassinga."

Victims of the 1978 raid, Cassinga.

By 1978, PLAN's presence had attracted the attention of the South African Defence Force. Executing a massive external raid (dubbed Operation Reindeer) involving paratroops of the 44 Parachute Regiment supported by bomber and strike aircraft, South Africa briefly occupied Cassinga on 4 May 1978. The assault, which left sixty Cuban military advisers and over five hundred South West African exiles dead, is now called Battle of Cassinga has been subject to international controversy. Angolan officials subsequently flew in a team of international journalists who photographed mass graves on site, verifying several bodies as women and children in civilian dress. Indignant at claims that its personnel had committed a war crime, the SADF continued to maintain that the defenders were uniformed PLAN combatants. The Angolan government counted 624 dead and 611 injured civilians as well as combatants. Among the dead were 167 women and 298 teenagers and children. Since many of the combatants were female or teenagers, and many combatants did not wear uniforms, the exact number of civilians among the dead could not be established. A secret report to the SWAPO Central Committee listed 582 dead and 400 wounded.

The Namibians abandoned the camp after the attacks and moved their headquarters to Lubango. As of 2015 the site of the battle is still partly mined, and the mass graves have fallen into disrepair.

Cassinga was the site of more fighting during Operation Askari, in late 1983. After driving back several Angolan units with air support and mechanised infantry, the SADF finally occupied the area for the second time on 22 December.

== Railway ==
Japanese interests wish to reopen the iron ore mine and link it by rail to the Namibian port of Walvis Bay, this being the most efficient port in the region. This railway would go via Oshikango on Namibia's northern border.

== See also ==
- Cassinga Day, a national holiday in Namibia honouring those killed during the Battle of Cassinga.
- Railway stations in Angola
- Transport in Angola
- Iron ore in Africa
