= Dongo, Huíla =

Dongo
- Commune and town
- Location in Angola
- Coordinates: 14°35′23.2″S 15°43′44″E
- Country: Angola
- Province: Huíla
- Municipality: Jamba
- Time zone: UTC+1 (WAT)
- Climate: Cwa

Dongo is a town and commune in the municipality of Jamba, province of Huíla, Angola.

Dongo is a junction on the Moçâmedes Railway for a branch line to Chamutete.

== See also ==
- Jamba, Huíla
- Railway stations in Angola
- Transport in Angola
