= Luinha, Angola =

Town in northern Angola

Luinha
- Town
- Location within Angola
- Coordinates: 09°12′00″S 14°41′00″E
- Country: Angola
- Province: Cuanza Norte
- Time zone: UTC+1:00 (WAT)

Luinha is a town in northern Angola.

== Transport ==
It is served by a station on the Luanda Railway. There is a junction to a branchline to the south.

== See also ==
- Railway stations in Angola
