= Operation Egret =

Military operation in Angola

- Part of South African Border War
- Location: Operation Egret (Angola)
- Objective: Pre-emptive raid against PLAN bases in the Evale, Anhanca and the Dova areas in Angola.
- Date: 15–22 September 1985
- Outcome: South African Success
- Casualties: 15 PLAN Soldiers Killed; 103 PLAN Soldiers Captured

Operation Egret was a military operation in Angola during September 1985 by the South African Defence Force (SADF) against People's Liberation Army of Namibia (PLAN) during the Angolan Civil War and South African Border War.

== Background ==
In order to interrupt a planned raid into South-West Africa/Namibia from Angola by PLAN's Charlie detachment, the SADF planned an operation into Angola on 15 September 1985 to counter the proposed incursion. This would be the first deliberate operation into Angola since Operation Askari with strict instructions to avoid FAPLA forces. 500 men of 101 Battalion and Puma, Alouette and Impala aircraft of the SAAF, would sweep the areas between Evale, Anhanca and Dova for the PLAN units. In nine separate contacts and one air attack, the SADF killed 15 PLAN soldiers and captured 103 with the operation ending on 22 September.

== Order of battle ==
=== South African and South West Africa Territorial Forces ===
- 101 Battalion

=== PLAN Forces ===
- PLAN "Charlie" detachment - Eighth Battalion
