= Cassinga Day =

National public holiday in Namibia

- Observed by: Namibia
- Date: 4 May
- Frequency: Annual

Cassinga Day is a national public holiday in Namibia remembering the Cassinga Massacre. Commemorated annually on 4 May, the date "remembers those (approximately 600) killed in 1978 when the South African Defence Force attacked a SWAPO base at Cassinga in southern Angola". Commemorations are marked yearly by ceremonies at Heroes' Acre, outside of Windhoek. These ceremonies are attended by many important national political figures, including former presidents Sam Nujoma, Hifikepunye Pohamba and Hage Geingob.

== 4 May 1978 ==
In the morning of May 4, 1978, the South African Defence Force ran an air strike on camp Cassinga near the village of Cassinga, followed by a deployment of paratroopers. The camp was inhabited by exiled SWAPO sympathisers and their families. 165 men, 294 women and 300 children died in this attack. Later the same day the nearby camp Vietnam in the village of Tchetequela was also attacked. As of 2016 the graves are unmarked but the Namibian government plans to erect a memorial site.
