= Jamba Airport =

Airport in Angola

- IATA: JMB; ICAO: FNJM

Summary
- Airport type: Public
- Serves: Jamba
- Elevation AMSL: 4,912 ft / 1,497 m
- Coordinates: 14°41′55″S 16°03′55″E

Map
- Location in Angola

Runways
Direction	Length		Surface
Direction	m	ft	Surface
08/26	1,660	5,446	Asphalt
- Sources: GCM Google Maps

Jamba Airport (IATA: JMB) is an airport serving Jamba, in Huíla Province, Angola.

== See also ==
- List of airports in Angola
- Transport in Angola
