= Regiment Molopo =

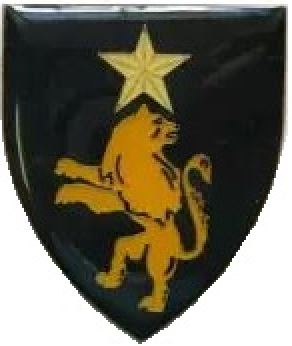
- Regiment Molopo emblem
- Active: 1960-1996
- Country: South Africa
- Allegiance: Republic of South Africa
- Branch: South African Army
- Type: Armoured Regiment
- Size: 800 people
- Part of: South African Armoured Corps; Army Conventional Reserve
- Garrison/HQ: Zeerust Mafikeng, Potchefstroom
- Motto: Gewapen maar Regverdig (Armed but Just)
- Equipment: Eland 90 armoured car Olifant Tanks
- Battle honours: Operation Askari; Operation Modular

Insignia
- Beret Colour: Black
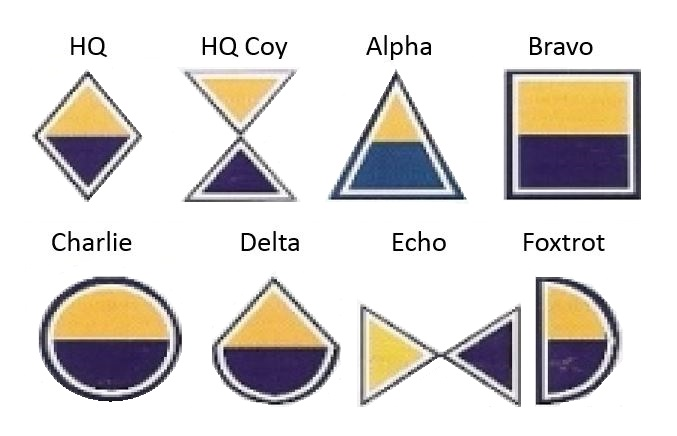
- Armour Squadron emblems

- Armour beret bar c. 1992

Regiment Molopo was an armoured regiment of the South African Army. As a reserve unit, it had a status roughly equivalent to that of a British Army Reserve or United States Army National Guard unit.

== History ==
=== Origin ===
Regiment Molopo was raised in 1960 as an armoured regiment equipped with armoured cars. In 1986 Regiment Molopo was changed from an armoured car unit to a tank regiment.

=== Border War ===
Regiment Molopo saw active service in the South West Africa/Angola campaign. The regiment participated in Operation Askari and Operation Moduler. It provided elements to combine with Regiment Mooirivier to form a composite unit of Olifant tanks under the command of Task Force Victor.

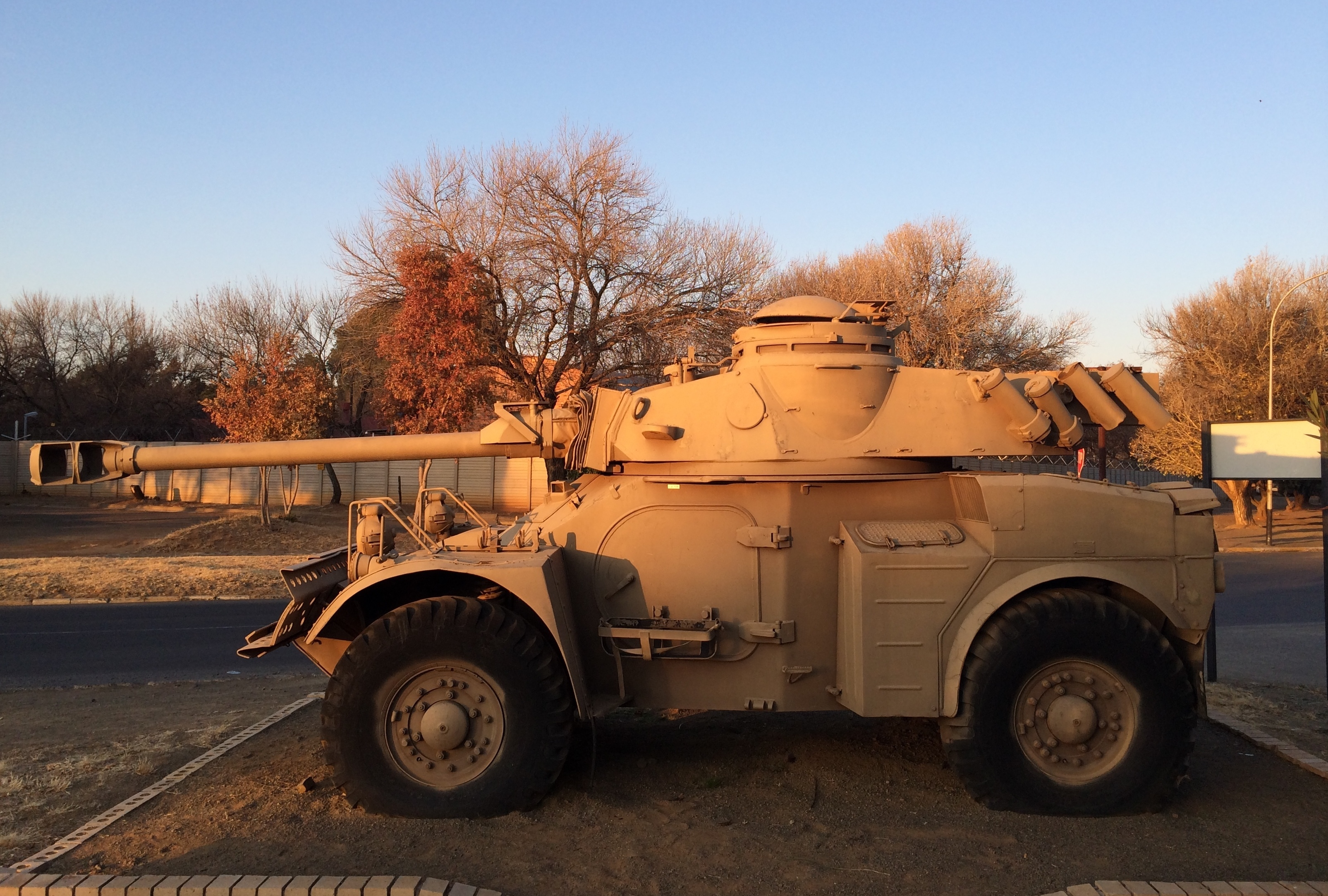
Eland facility marker at Tempe

=== Brigade affiliation ===
Regiment Molopo was affiliated with 73 Motorised Brigade from 1983 until 1991.

=== Disbandment ===
Regiment Molopo closed around 1995 and its memorabilia and colours were transferred to the Pretoria Regiment for safekeeping.

== Regimental symbols ==
=== Dress Insignia ===
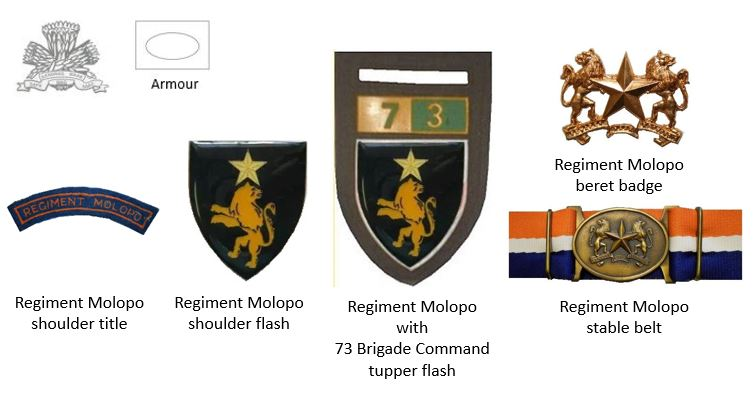
SADF era Regiment Molopo insignia

== Operations ==
Regiment Molopo participated in a number of operations including :

- Operation Askari
- Operation Moduler

== Leadership ==
Leadership
From	Honorary Colonel	To	Ribbon
	No known incumbents		
From	Officer Commanding	To	Ribbon
1960	Cmdt N.J. Oosthuizen	c. 1970	
1970	Cmdt J. du Rand	c. 1973	
1974	Cmdt G.L. Strydom	c. 1979	
c. 1979	Cmdt P.J. Bekker	c. 1979	
c. 1980	Cmdt T. du Preez Snyman	c. 1984	
c. 1984	Cmdt J van Loggerenberg	c. 1987	
c. 1987	Cmdt J.L.S. Schoeman	c. 1991	
c. 1991	Lt Col S.J. van Niekerk	c. 1995	
c. 1996	Cmdt C.J. Fourie	c. 1996	
From	Regimental Sergeant Major	To	Ribbon
c. 1960	WO1 J.H. Hough	c. 1965	
c. 1966	WO1 D.J. Kotze	c. 1983	
c. 1984	WO1 J.A. Scholtz	c. 1987	
c. 1988	WO1 D.W. Reyneke	c. 1996	
