= Operation Magneto =

- Part of the Angolan Civil War and South African Border War
- Location: Angola Operation Magneto (Angola)
- Objective: Aid UNITA to transport its troops to Cazombo
- Date: 23 August – 10 September 1985
- Outcome: UNITA-SAAF Victory

Operation Magneto was a military operation in August 1985 to transport UNITA soldiers by the South African Defence Force (SADF) during the Angolan Civil War and South African Border War.

== Background ==
In mid 1985, the Angolan government formulated an offensive called Operation Congresso II. The plan called for the largest ever, two-front attack on UNITA forces in Angola. Led by Soviet and Cuban military advisors this plan called for a simultaneous attack on Cazombo in the east and Mavinga in the south-east and to take one or both objectives by 3 September. The objective of the operation was to split UNITA forces, forcing them to fight on two fronts and therefore weakening their defensive capability. The potential loss of Mavinga by UNITA could give FAPLA the opportunity to stage a further attack on UNITA's capital at Jamba. The South Africans believed that if Mavinga was taken, FAPLA would move its air defence network southwards, threatening the South African Air Force (SAAF) ability to protect Jamba from Angolan air attack, making it susceptible to ground attack and opening southern Angola to increased SWAPO activity into Namibia.

== Operation ==
Cazombo is situated in eastern Angola close to the border with Zambia was under UNITA control. In response to FAPLA's advance to recapture the region and town, UNITA requested assistance from the SADF to move its soldiers from the south to the east using the SAAF. The SAAF sent mobile air operations teams (MAOT) to each airfield to control the planned operations that would take place at night to prevent interference by Angolan air force combat aircraft. The operations would last from 23 August until 10 September 1985 and would involve 220 flying hours by C-130 and C-160 transport aircraft and 30 hours of Puma helicopter flights to UNITA controlled airfields at Cazombo and Gago Couthino.

The operation would be reversed and the UNITA soldiers were flown back by the SAAF to assist in the defence of Mavinga and their headquarters at Jamba. The return and defence operations were known as Operation Weldmesh and Operation Wallpaper.
