= Camizunzo =

Town in Bengo Province, Angola

- Location within Angola
- Coordinates: 09°03′00″S 13°39′00″E
- Country: Angola
- Province: Bengo
- Time zone: UTC+1:00 (WAT)

Camizunzo is a small town to the east of the capital of Angola, Luanda, in Bengo Province.

A €22 million loan from the UK Export Finance department was approved in 2024 to improve rural water supply to Camizunzo and other nearby communities.

== Transport ==
It is served by a station on the northern line of the national railway system.

== See also ==
- Railway stations in Angola
