= Operation Cerebus =

- Part of South African Border War
- Location: Operation Cerebus (Angola)
- Target: Shoot down Angolan military aircraft
- Date: 5 October – 3 November 1985

Operation Cerebus was a South African Defence Force (SADF) special forces operation in Angola during October 1985 in the South African Border War and Angolan Civil War.

== Background ==
To discourage any further advances by FAPLA forces towards Mavinga after Operation Wallpaper, it was decided to further hinder Angolan airforce operations between Menongue and Cuito Cuanavale. Two captured mobile SA-9 anti-aircraft missile systems were flown into the UNITA held airfield at Mavinga by South African Air Force (SAAF) C-130 Hercules. They were then driven north-west by SADF special forces and UNITA soldiers to an area between Menongue, Longa and Cuito Cuanavale. The operation was not successful and no aircraft shot down, the Angolan's airforce avoiding the area.
