= Operation Nobilis =

- Part of the South African Border War
- Location: Angola; 8.80°S 13.25°E
- Objective: Destruction of three Angolan OSA missile boats or alternative ships.
- Date: 15 July – 7 August 1984
- Location within Angola

Operation Nobilis was a special forces and naval operation in 1984 by the South African Defence Force (SADF) during the Angolan Civil War and South African Border War. Its objective was the destruction of three Angolan OSA missile boats in Luanda harbour with alternative targets of other Angolan naval or commercial transport vessels in the military harbour.

== Background ==
From 1982 until 1983, six Osa II were transferred from the Soviet Navy to the Angolan Navy. Though the South African Navy Minister-class strike craft could outmatch these Angolan vessels, it was their missile systems and in particular their radar systems that could end the dominance the South African Navy (SAN) had in Angolan waters. These Angolan vessels were now being deployed not only in Luanda but other coastal ports such as Soyo, Lobito and Moçâmedes.

On 10 July, the SADF orders where issued to destroy three Osa II missile boats by the end of July. If these could not be attacked, then military cargo vessels should be attacked as long as they were not flying Soviet flags. UNITA would be asked to claim responsibility and hence the mines would be placed close to the surface so as to give the impression of divers not being used.

4 Reconnaissance Regiment would supply the attack team and the medical team came from 7 Medical Battalion Group. The navy would supply the SAS Oswald Pirow and SAS Jim Fouche strike craft to deliver the special forces team to the submarine SAS Johanna van der Merwe, before retreating back to the Cunene River, retrieving them at the end of the mission, with the SAS Protea in support off Luderitz. The attack dates were from 28 to 31 July.

Five 5 kg Torpex mines would be carried with a sixth dummy mine used to implicate UNITA. The mission would not use the entrance of the bay but the team would be boated close to land, leave the water and cross a peninsula, re-enter the water in the bay and resume swimming to the vessels to that were to be mined.

== Order of battle ==
=== South African forces ===
- elements – 4 Reconnaissance Regiment
- elements – 7 Medical Battalion Group
- SAS Johanna van der Merwe
- SAS Oswald Pirow
- SAS Jim Fouche
- SAS Protea

== Operation ==
After loading the zodiac boats and the mission cargo on board the submarine SAS Johanna van der Merwe the previous evening, the submarine sailed from Simon's Town naval base at 11h00 on 16 July and headed north up South Africa's west coast. On the evening of 22 July, the strike craft SAS Oswald Pirow and SAS Jim Fouche arrived at Saldanha Bay. At 09h00 23 July, having boarded the special forces team and the medical team, the two craft would leave heading northwards. The three vessels would rendezvous on the early evening of 26 July with the special forces team transferring to the SAN submarine and removal of some of its personnel to make space.

On the night of the 27 July, the SAN submarine arrived off the Luanda. Late that evening, two zodiac boat was launched and headed to the peninsula that creates the bay in Luanda for a preliminary reconnaissance prior to the attack mission. Two divers were then launched and they swam to the shoreline close to the Panorama Hotel. The vehicle and pedestrian traffic was enough to prevent them leaving the water and by 03h10 the team was back aboard the submarine. During the briefing that followed the reconnaissance, the probability of using the bay entrance instead was discussed with another reconnaissance and possible mission planned for the following night. But on the night of 28 July, the mission was scrapped due to equipment engine issues and postponed until the next night.

On Sunday evening 29 July, the submarine surfaced and the three boats were launched and headed for the peninsula but the traffic was found to be too heavy to cross the road by foot to reach the harbour so the boats headed for the entrance of the bay.

The three boats approached the naval base in Luanda harbour and it was soon established that both the strong currents and patrols within the base made the targets too dangerous for a successful mission. But between the naval base and a military quay on the opposite side of the bay, the South African attack team found two merchant vessels at anchorage awaiting a space at the military berth and so were assumed to be carrying military cargo.

With the three boats and crews remaining tied to a wreck in the bay, six divers then swam for the wreck with their mines. On the swim to the ships, one mine was lost due to a faulty flotation device. The five remaining mines were attached and after all divers re-joined, swam back to the wreck. Their boats were forced to move around the wreck after a patrol boat illuminated the wreck. The boats and teams were recovered from 03h14 after the submarine had found them as they had drifted 1500 metres north from their rendezvous point due to strong currents.

Pick-up was rapid as radar contacts by a possible patrol boat had been made and the submarine would be followed before the contact was broken. Explosions were seen at 04h50 30 July followed by radio interceptions of Luanda's Port Authority of mayday calls being received from the two ships. By 21h00 on 1 August, the SAN submarine had rendezvoused with the two SAN strike craft and the attack team were transferred to the vessels. The two SAN would arrive back at Saldanha Bay on 3 August while the submarine would arrive back, after making repairs, on 7 August.

== Aftermath ==
UNITA would later claim responsibility when they released a communique out of Lisbon, Portugal on 2 August 1984 stating they had sunk a Soviet and Cuban ship, destroying war material. The Angolan news agency ANGOP announced an Angolan and East German ship had been damaged by saboteurs with American mines, a statement the Americans quickly denied. The Angolans and Russians had studied the dummy mine and their investigations concluded it was too unsophisticated to have been the type that had caused the destruction and that the operation was the work of the South African special forces though the use of a submarine was not suspected. Anti-diving countermeasures would be introduced in the harbour as well as increased naval patrols.

The two ships that had been attacked were, the MV Arendsee a 7,500 ton East German cargo vessel and the MV Lundoge a 9,000 ton Angolan vessel. Arendsee, carrying heavy vehicles, artillery and industrial cargo, was sunk by two explosions and resting on the bottom stern up would be towed to a sandbar four hours later.. A dummy mine would later be removed from her, her cargo removed and as she was unable to be repaired, towed out to sea and sunk on 30 August. The Lundoge, carrying military equipment and foodstuff, was hit by two explosions, was sailed by its crew to a nearby quay before settling. With most of her cargo destroyed she was patched up and sailed to Rio de Janeiro where she was repaired and re-entered service until 1995.
