= Operation Klinker =

- Part of the South African Border War
- Location: Operation Klinker (Angola)
- Objective: Air attack by the SAAF against a PLAN training base outside Lubango in Angola.
- Date: 29 December 1983
- Outcome: South African victory: Successful Bombing by South African Air force

Operation Klinker was a military operation in Angola during December 1983 by the South African Defence Force (SADF) and South African Air Force (SAAF) during the Angolan Civil War and South African Border War.

== Background ==
The object of this operation was an attack on a People's Liberation Army of Namibia (PLAN) training base in Angola, intimidating them into a belief that the SADF could strike them anywhere and that it too could be a target of Operation Askari. The Tobias Hainyeko Training Centre was located close to the city of Lubango and was used to train PLAN recruits in various military fields. A special forces team had been deployed in the Lubango area between November and December 1983 to conduct reconnaissance. The raid took place on the morning of 29 December 1983, by four Buccaneer strike aircraft of 24 Squadron. Thirty two bombs were dropped by the SAAF aircraft, some exploded immediately while the rest were on delayed charges making the base temporally unusable.
