= Railway stations in Angola =

Angola railway network 1067mm gauge tracks, 610mm gauge tracks (closed) ; 1067mm proposed

Railway stations in Angola include:

== Towns served by rail ==
=== North line (Luanda Railway) (CFL) ===
(Also known as Luanda Railway) (originally 1000 mm gauge, now 1067 mm gauge)

- Luanda – port – national capital; junction
  - Bungo (0 km) Start of Duplication.
  - Caxito – branch terminus; provincial capital
  - Quicabo
- Funda
  - Cabiri – branch terminus
- Sambizanga
- Rangel
- Cazenga – workshops
- Viana (23 km) – suburban station; stadium
  - (junction)
  - Baía Farta branch terminus; end of duplication
- Camizunzo
- Catete
- Zenza do Itombe – junction
  - Dondo – branch terminus
  - Quixinge – branch extension
- Beira Alta (Angola, Cuanza Norte)
- Canhoca – junction
  - Cambondo – branch terminus
- N'dalatando
- Cacuso
- Lombe
- Malanje (479 km) – terminus
- Golungo Alto – branch terminus

- Musseques – first passenger halt from port
- Filda
- Grafanil
- Estagem
- Comarca
- Viana
- Pomagol

- Bungo
- Texatang
- Boa Vista

- Cazenga – workshops

- Luinha – short branch

- Luanda
- Barra do Dande proposed new port

=== Middle line ===
(610mm gauge = closed)

- Porto Amboim – port
- Gabela – terminus at mine

=== Central line (Benguela Railway) (CFB) ===
(all 1067 mm gauge)

- Lobito – port and terminus
- Catumbela – junction of original route (now Benguela branch) with 1948 deviation
- Benguela – port, terminus of branch line since 1948
- Catengue – on steeply graded section of original route which was bypassed and abandoned in 1948
- Caimbambo – end of 1948 deviation
- Cubal – 171 km
- Ganda
- Caála – junction of Cuima branch
- Huambo – (380 km) (was Nova Lisboa) – workshops
- Chinguar
- Kuito
- Camacupa
- Cuemba
- Chicala
- Luena
- Luacano junction for proposed short cut rail line to Zambian copper mines
- Luau – (1269 km) – border with DRCongo
- Dilolo, Congo Kinshasa

- Cavaco River

- Caála – junction
  - Cuima – branch terminus, line formerly continued to a mine at the Cunhangamua river

- Benguela line junction
  - Proposed short cut line due 2012
  - (Angola) Benguela Railway (CFB)
  - (Angola) Luacano junction to Zambia
  - (Zambia) (Angola) Jimbe border checkpoint
  - Chingola, Zambia – railhead

=== South Line (Moçâmedes Railway) (CFM) ===
(originally 600 millimetres (2 ft 0 in) gauge, converted to 1,067 millimetres (3 ft 6.0 in) gauge in the 1950s.)

- Moçâmedes – port
- Sacomar – (~5 km) – marshalling yards
- Bibala
- Lubango (246 km) – junction

- Maquelo,
- Laceiras,
- Micose,
- Cabanas,
- Kapunda,
- Kuvango,
- Tombolo,
- Vembambi,
- Viungue
- Kuelei.

- Matala – intermediate station
- Dongo – (500 km) – junction
- Dongo Novo
- Entroncamento
- Cubango
- Cuchi
- Menongue – terminus (756 km)

- Caraculo – concrete sleeper plant in 2008

- Lubango – junction
- Chibia – yards
- Chiange – branch terminus (150 km) which may be extended to link with Namibia.
- Cuvelai
- Ondjiva – provincial capital

- Dongo – junction
- Cassinga – iron ore
- Chamutete – branch terminus in far south

- Cuto

- (Unknown location)
- Namialo – concrete sleeper plant.

== Proposed ==
=== Northern ===
- Integrated Railway System would build the following:
- Luanda through the provinces of Bengo, Uíge, Zaire and Cabinda
- (Angola) Luena
- (Angola) Luau
- Matadi
  - (Democratic Republic of the Congo) junction with Matadi-Kinshasa Railway
  - includes road-rail Matadi Bridge over Congo River in Democratic Republic of the Congo
- (Angola) Cabinda Province exclave
- (Republic of the Congo) Pointe Noire- (Republic of the Congo) Brazzaville.

=== Central North ===
- Malanje
- Kuito

=== Central (Benguela line) ===
- (Angola) Luacano, Moxico province east junction
  - Short cut line due 2012; current route via DR Congo
  - (Zambia) Lumwana line
  - (Zambia) Solwezi new mining town
  - (Zambia) Chingola
- Zambia

=== Central South ===
- Kuito
- Dondo

=== Southern ===
- Dongo – junction
- Chamutete railhead in south; also spelled Tchamutete.
- Cuvelai
- Ondjiva – provincial capital
- Namacunde

- Cassinga
- Cuvango
- Santa-Clara, Angola – near border with Namibia
- Oshikango, Namibia – (Angola-Namibia border)
- Ondangwa railhead in north of Namibia

- Matala October 2009
- Lubango – junction

== See also ==
- Railway stations in Congo Brazzaville
- Railway stations in Congo Kinshasa
- Transport in Angola
- Railway stations in Namibia
