= Operation Abrasion =

- Part of the Angolan Civil War and South African Border War
- Location: Angola Operation Abrasion (Angola)
- Objective: Disrupt FAPLA supplies from Menongue to Cuito Cuanavale
- Date: 18 December 1985 – mid February 1986
- Outcome: UNITA-South African Success; FAPLA supplies disrupted

Operation Abrasion was a South African special forces military operation in December 1985 by the South African Defence Force (SADF) during the Angolan Civil War and South African Border War.

== Background ==
The plan was to disrupt the supply caravanas (supply convoys) run by Cuban and FAPLA troops between Menongue and Cuito Cuanavale. Earlier caravanas were subject to attacks from landmines, UNITA and air attacks from the South African Air Force (SAAF). The caravanas differed in size but were said to consist of a bulldozer, a BTR-60, BMP-1 and an anti-aircraft vehicle, followed by five to ten supply vehicles and then similar vehicles in the rear guard. These caravanas could take up to ten days to travel the 184 km journey between Menongue and Cuito Cuanavale.

The SADF team would consist of fifty special forces troops and seven Unimog Sabre vehicles and a component UNITA soldiers with the plan to conduct hit and run attacks against these convoys. The operation lasted from 18 December 1985 until mid-February 1986.

The SAAF component would consist of the use of C-130 transport aircraft to fly the special forces troops and their equipment into Mavinga, the use of Puma helicopters for medical rescue based in Rundu and Impala aircraft used as radio relays between the troops and headquarters.
