= Operation Boswilger =

Coordinates: 17.3227°S 13.9211°E

- Part of the South African Border War
- Objective: Pursuit of PLAN insurgents
- Date: 29–30 June 1985
- Outcome: South African victory
- Casualties: 56 PLAN Soldiers Killed

Operation Boswilger (English: Operation Bush Willow) was a military operation executed by the South West Africa Territorial Force in June 1985 during the South African Border War and Angolan Civil War. The SADF soldiers pursued SWAPO's, PLAN insurgents, who had attacked infrastructure, out of South West Africa/Namibia across the border into Angola.

== Background ==
On 28 June, PLAN insurgents entered South West Africa damaging a bridge between Epali and Ondangwa, sabotaging twenty telephone poles, mortaring the Eenhana SADF base and a bomb was detonated at the Ongwediva Teachers Training College No one was injured in these attacks.

On 29 June 1985, South West Africa Territory Force (SWATF) mechanised reaction teams set off in a hot pursuit operation following the tracks. Orders had been given by Brigadier Joep Joubert, to follow the insurgents even if they crossed back into Angola. Bases were attacked up to 40 km inside Angola. There was twenty-three contacts in the first day killing forty-three insurgents and thirteen contacts and another fourteen insurgents killed on the second day. The operation lasted two days before the SWATF withdrew back across the border to SWA.

At the end of the operation, 56 PLAN insurgents had been killed with one dead from the SWATF with large amounts of weapons and ammunition captured. Later, South African Foreign Minister Pik Botha would justify the operation to cross the border into Angola as the Angolan's had failed to prevent the incursions of SWAPO's insurgents into South West Africa/Namibian territory, as prescribed by the Lusaka Accords.

== Bibliography ==
- Steenkamp, Willem (1989). South Africa's border war, 1966–1989. Gibraltar: Ashanti Pub. ISBN 0620139676.
