= Sacomar, Angola =

Urban district in Angola

Coordinates: 15°07′36″S 12°09′13″E

Sacomar is an urban district in southern Angola, part of city of the Moçâmedes.

== Transport ==
It is the location of marshalling yards associated with the nearby port of Moçâmedes, serving as a connection between the port and the passenger and cargo railway station of the Moçâmedes Railway.

== See also ==
- Railway stations in Angola
- Transport in Angola
