= Cuto, Angola =

Town

Coordinates: 14°54′00″S 12°51′00″E

Cuto is a town in southern Angola.

== Transport ==
It is near a deviation of the southern line of the national railway network.

== See also ==
- Railway stations in Angola
