= Operation Bruilof =

- Part of the South African Border War
- Location: Angola Operation Bruilof (Angola)
- Target: PLAN bases in the vicinity of Chetequera
- Date: Planned May 1978

Operation Bruilof (English: Operation Wedding) was a planned military operation in 1978 by the South African Defence Force during the South African Border War and Angolan Civil War.

== Background ==
The operation was planned for May 1978, to be conducted by 61 Mechanised Infantry Battalion Group and paratroops. This was to be the first mechanised force to be deployed by the South African forces during the war and consisted of the then new Ratel Infantry Fighting Vehicles as well as Eland Armoured Cars.

The plan called for the SADF to cross the South-West Africa–Angola border, with the battle group attacking and destroying six South-West Africa People's Organisation bases around Chetequera before withdrawing.

The plan was eventually abandoned and merged into what became Operation Reindeer planned for the 4 May.
