= Operation Rekstok =

South African operation during the Border War

- Part of the South African Border War Operation Rekstok (Angola)
- Objective: SADF forces entered Angola and attacked SWAPO bases at Mongua, Oncocua, Henhombe and Heque.
- Date: 6–13 March 1979

Operation Rekstok was a series of South African raids into southern Angola on 7 March 1979 during the South African Border War. The operation lasted six days. Operating from Ovamboland, SADF forces entered Angola and attacked SWAPO bases at Mongua, Oncocua, Henhombe and Heque. During the operation, a SAAF bomber was shot down, killing Lieutenant Wally Marais and Second Lieutenant O. J. Doyle. The SADF conducted Rekstok concurrently with Operation Safraan and later performed Operation Sceptic.
