= Chamutete =

Town in Angola

- Location within Angola
- Coordinates: 15°14′03″S 16°02′34″E
- Country: Angola
- Province: Huíla
- Time zone: UTC+1:00 (WAT)

Chamutete is a town in southern Angola. Chamutete is also spelled Techamutete. It lies in Huíla Province.

== Transport ==
It is currently terminus for a branch railway from Dongo on the Southern Railway system. In 2007, talks between Angola and Namibia were considering the interlinking of their respective railways with a line passing through Chamutete, and Oshikango on the border. The central and northern systems would remain to be linked.

== See also ==
- Cassinga
- Railway stations in Angola
- Transport in Angola
