= Baía, Bengo =

Town in Bengo, Angola

Baía
- Town
- Interactive map of Baía
- Coordinates: 8°58′0.01″S 13°39′0″E
- Country: Angola
- Province: Bengo
- Time zone: WAT

Baia is a small town in Bengo, Angola. It is located on the outskirts of the Angolan capital Luanda.

== Transport ==
It is served by a station on the Luanda Railway.

In 2003, it was proposed to duplicate the railway line from Bungo, Angola.

== See also ==
- Railway stations in Angola
