= Operation Reindeer =

1978 South African military operation

- Part of South African Border War
- Operation Reindeer (Angola)
Date	4–10 May 1978
Location	Angola
Result	South African victory

Belligerents
South Africa	SWAPO

Commanders and leaders
John Vorster (South Africa) Constand Viljoen (South Africa) Ian Gleeson (South Africa) P. W. Botha (South Africa) Jan Breytenbach	Unknown

Units involved
SADF	Unknown

Strength
Unknown	2,200+

Casualties and losses
7 killed 39 wounded	SWAPO claim: 582–624 killed 400–611 wounded South African claim: 1,000 killed 200 captured

Operation Reindeer, which began on 4 May 1978, was South Africa's second major military operation in Angola, the first being Operation Savannah.

The South African operation consisted of an assault by 2 South African Infantry Battalion on two South West Africa People's Organisation (SWAPO) base complexes, Chetequera and Dombondola, near to the then-South West Africa/Angola border; an assault by the elite 32 Battalion on SWAPO's Omepepa-Namuidi-Henhombe base complex around 20 km east of Chetequera; and finally, the attack the operation is most known for — a controversial airborne assault by paratroopers on Cassinga, a refugee camp and SWAPO's regional headquarters, 260 km inside Angola. The operation ended on 10 May 1978.

== Background ==
Prime Minister John Vorster met his defence advisers in December 1977. They discussed the need to take stronger measures against SWAPO, moving from the defensive position of reacting to PLAN incursions into SWA/Namibia, to one where the SADF would conduct pre-emptive attacks on PLAN bases in Angola. All external operational plans would have to have the approval of the Prime Minister.

Early in 1978, planning had begun for Operation Bruilof which involved a combined mechanised infantry and airborne attack on SWAPO bases around the town of Chetequera, 25 km inside Angola. These plans were abandoned and were expanded into a new plan called Operation Reindeer. This new operation included plans to attack the Chetequera bases but added the more important objective of attacking the SWAPO headquarters at Cassinga. The date of the operation was set for the 4 May.

== Planning ==
Operation Reindeer planning identified three targets:

=== Target Alpha "Moscow" ===
The target was the former copper mining town of Cassinga which was about 250 km inside Angola. Cassinga had been converted into a SWAPO operational HQ, training base and refugee transit camp for Southern Angola commanded by Commander Dimo Hamaambo. South African military intelligence believed that the base contained around 1,200 recruits. The base was surrounded by zigzag trenches and bunkers. The plan involved three stages, an aerial attack by SAAF fighter bombers, followed by a parachute drop led by Colonel Jan Breytenbach, and lastly the withdrawal of paratroops by helicopter. The objectives were to destroy the base, capture Commander Dimo Hamaambo, destroy supplies and equipment, gather intelligence and take prisoners. The last objective was to free POW Sapper Johan van der Mescht.

=== Target Bravo "Vietnam" ===
This plan was for the attack by the SADF on six bases at Chetequera which included a SWAPO forward HQ for Western Ovamboland and supply base. Intelligence believed that these bases had a combined total of between 900 and 1000 PLAN insurgents. These bases were heavily defended by trenches and bunkers and contained weapons such as recoilless guns, RPG-7, 82mm mortars and 14.5mm AA guns. The plan involved an attack by mechanised Battle Group Juliet of SADF troops of national servicemen and permanent force soldiers commanded by Commandant Frank Bestbier. A further two independent combat teams would attack the southernmost bases. The plan ended with a withdrawal back over the border.

=== Target Charlie ===
The plan involved an attack on the smaller bases and suspected bases east of Chetequera. The attacked would be carried out by five rifle companies of the 32 Battalion supported by air and artillery units. The commander would be Commandant Deon Ferreira.

== SADF Order of Battle ==
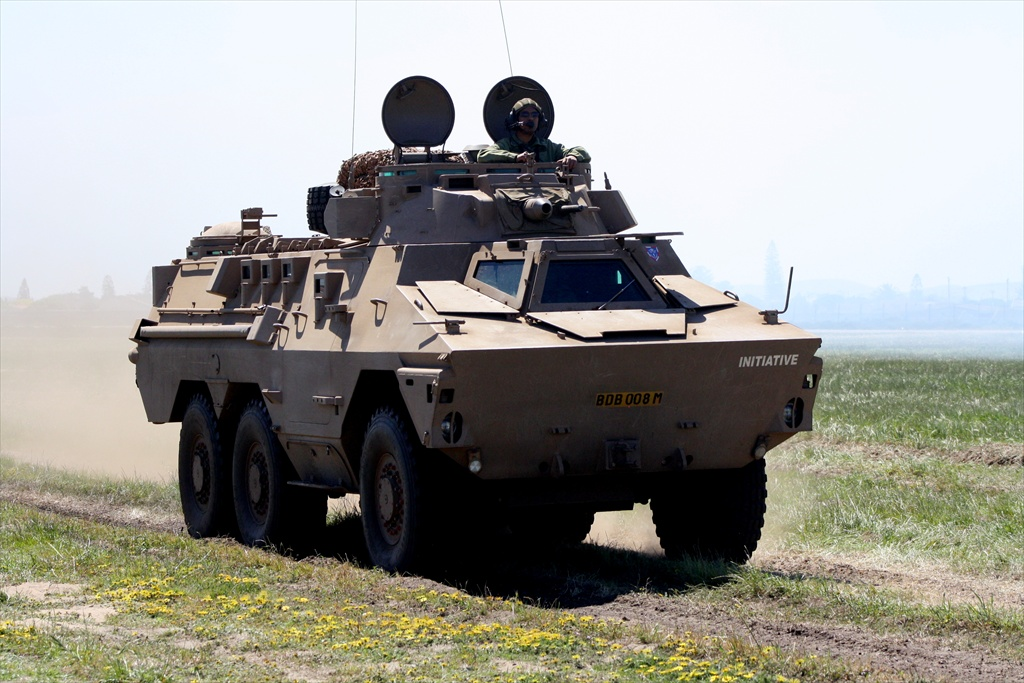
Reindeer marked the combat debut of the Ratel infantry fighting vehicle.

The following SADF units took part on the following targets:

=== Cassinga ===
Composite Parachute Battalion

- Made up of elements from 1, 2 and 3 Parachute Battalions

9 Rifle Platoon
11 Rifle Platoon
2 Hawk Groups from 1 Parachute Battalion

=== Chetequera and Dombondola ===
1 South African Infantry Battalion

- Combat Group Juliet (assault on Chetequera)
- Combat Group Joubert (assault on Dombondola)
- Combat Group Serfontein (assault on Dombondola)

=== Omepepa-Namuidi-Henhombe ===
32 Battalion

- 5 rifle companies
- 81mm mortar platoon
- 140mm artillery troop
- Helicopter gunships

== Battles ==
=== Chetequera and Dombondola ===
The plan called for Combat Team Juliet to attack the Chetequera base from the north while Combat Teams Joubert and Serfontein would cross the border and attack the bases around Dombondola from the south. Juliet crossed the border around 10 am on 4 May in the new Ratels. They headed east past Dombondola to assemble north of Chetequera but arrived 90 minutes late due to the condition of the Angolan bush and road tracks. This delayed the air attack by the SAAF which began around 13h30 with Canberras and Buccaneers bombing the base. Due to radio delays between Combat Team Juliet's forward air controller, the attack by ground forces started late giving PLAN time to prepare. Thick bush and maize fields interrupted the effectiveness of the mechanised infantry and individual units found themselves fighting on their own at close quarters in the trenches with rifles and grenades. The initial assault lasted only 11 minutes before all the units were able to reassemble and at which point it was realised that part of the base had been missed. The base was attacked again and by 15:30 pm fighting ceased, with the remaining PLAN forces either killed, surrendered or having escaped into the bush. It was recorded that 248 PLAN member had been killed and 200 captured while CG Juliet lost 2 men and had 10 wounded. Due to the delay in the start of the operation, Juliet spent the night in defensive positions in the Angolan bush and returned to the SWA border the next day.

Due to the heavy fighting at Chetequera, the SADF decided to use artillery to bombard the PLAN bases at Chatu and Dombondola 1 & 2. The two combat groups then crossed the border and headed for their respective targets. Combat Group Joubert headed off late and then got lost, arriving at the base from the wrong direction and used a swing manoeuvre with the assistance of a planned artillery bombardment, which never materialised, to attack the Chatu base. The attack lasted 30 minutes and concluded with its capture and the seizure of weapons. CG Joubert spent the night in defensive positions and returned the next day to SWA by 10 am with CG Juliet.

Combat Group Serfontein was to assist CG Joubert if required. This was not necessary and so attacked its objective of Dombondola 2. The base was found to be deserted and was destroyed and weapons captured. Serfontein was then ready to attack its next objective but the missions were cancelled and the group returned to SWA.

=== Omepepa-Namuidi-Henhombe ===
The operation to attack the smaller SWAPO bases just north of the SWA border began on the morning of 6 May 1978. Three 32 Battalion companies advanced on the first target, with one company protecting the artillery troop while the fifth company was held in reserve. On lining up to attack the first target, artillery fire was called in to soften up the target. Due to an error in the calibration of the artillery pieces, the 32 Battalion units were shelled by their own side resulting in one death and eighteen wounded. The SA forces retreated south of their intended target to evacuate their wounded and the first target was attacked the next day after the artillery troop had moved forward. By the 8th of May, SAAF helicopters were added to the attack plan and 32 Battalion troops were airlifted from one target to another with five SWAPO bases attacked that day. On the 9th of May, the operation resumed without air support with bases being attacked throughout the day. 10 May was followed by further attacks on bases with several being empty of any enemy forces resulting in some of the 32 Battalion units being returned to the edge of the border. Though the operation officially ended on the 10th of May, the last base was attacked in the early morning of 11 May with all SADF forces back over the border by 10h00.

== Aftermath ==
On the 25 April, several days before the beginning of Operation Reindeer, the South African government had agreed to the Western nations proposal of a settlement in SWA/Namibia though these proposals had not been accepted by SWAPO. At the same time, the UN General Assembly had begun a 10-day session to discuss South Africa's control of South West Africa which ended on the day before the raid on the 4th of May. The Angolan news agency was the first to report a raid on a refugee camp at Cassinga, on the same day it occurred and this made international news that evening. During that day Radio Moscow was reporting a raid on a refugee camp and by that evening a special session of the UN Security Council was convened at the request of Angola. Sam Nujoma, SWAPO's leader, addressed the council calling for a full economic, oil and arms embargo of South Africa and resulted in the United Nations Security Council Resolution 428. By 8 May, SWAPO and its leader Sam Nujoma had left the talks in New York due to a belief that negotiations for a settlement to the SWA/Namibia question would serve no purpose at this stage.

SWAPO and the Angola government put their estimations of the number of casualties in a range between 582 and 624 people. South Africa claimed to have killed 1000 PLAN combatants with 200 captured. SADF's own casualties for Operation Reindeer were presented as 7 dead and 39 wounded.

== See also ==
- Operation Protea
- United Nations Security Council Resolution 428
