= Operation Wallpaper =

1980s South African Defence Force military operation

- Part of the Angolan Civil War and South African Border War
- Location: Angola Operation Wallpaper (Angola)
- Objective: Protection of Mavinga
- Date: 7 September – 6 October 1985

Operation Wallpaper (aka Operation Weldmesh) was a military operation by the South African Defence Force (SADF) during the Angolan Civil War and South African Border War.

SADF and National Union for the Total Independence of Angola (UNITA) forces defeated a coalition of Cuban and People's Armed Forces for the Liberation of Angola (FAPLA) troops, fighting on behalf of the People's Movement for the Liberation of Angola (MPLA), in September 1985 around Mavinga. The SADF victory later helped UNITA militants defeat the MPLA troops in the Battle of Lomba River I.

== Background ==
In mid 1985, the Angolan government formulated an offensive called Operation Congresso II. Led by Soviet and Cuban military advisors the plan called for a simultaneous attack on Cazombo in the east and Mavinga in the south-east and to take one or both objectives by 3 September. The objective of the operation was to split UNITA forces, forcing them to fight on two fronts and therefore weakening their defensive capability. The potential loss of Mavinga by UNITA could give FAPLA the opportunity to stage a further attack on UNITA's capital at Jamba. The South Africans believed that if Mavinga was taken, FAPLA would move its air defence network southwards, threatening the South African Air Force (SAAF) ability to protect Jamba from Angolan air attack, making it susceptible to ground attack and opening southern Angola to increased SWAPO activity into Namibia.

The offensive started at the end of July, with UNITA initiating spoiling attacks against the FAPLA columns as they moved towards their objectives. By the beginning of September, FAPLA had reached the outskirts of UNITA's defensive positions around the towns of Cazombo and Mavinga. The SADF involvement would take two parts: Operation Wallpaper involved the airborne movement of UNITA troops from Cazombo to Mavinga while Operation Weldmesh concerned the defense of UNITA around Mavinga.

== Order of battle ==
=== South African forces ===
32 Battalion

- Three rifle companies
- 81mm mortar group
- Machine gun section
- Assault Pioneer section
- Three reconnaissance teams
- Headquarters

Two SA-9 teams

MRL troop

61 Mechanised Infantry Battalion held in reserve in Namibia

=== UNITA forces ===
2,400 men including 250 men defending Mavinga

=== Angolan forces ===
- 7th Brigade
- 8th Brigade
- 13th Brigade
- 25th Brigade

== Battle ==
The Angolan brigades left Cuito Cuanavale on 15 August, with the 8th and 13th following the main road to Mavinga via the town of Cunjamba and the 7th and 25th moving southwards following the Cunzumbia and Cuzizi rivers and having reached the Lomba river, flanking left and followed that river to an area north of Mavinga. Operation Wallpaper came into being on 7 September when the South African Defence Force (SADF) 32 Battalion was given the go ahead to move to Mavinga. The troops of 32 Battalion and additional attachments were dressed in UNITA uniforms and flown to Mavinga by the SAAF. All additional equipment was driven across the border to Mavinga. 61 Mechanised Infantry Battalion was placed in reserve. UNITA had deployed 2,400 men to defend the positions around Mavinga, with 250 men to defend the town and airfield itself. The Angolan forces were now 50 km north west of Mavinga.

By 8 September the South African equipment had arrived and by 11 September the SADF units were in position to support UNITA and attack the FAPLA brigades. On the early morning of 12 September the SADF Valkiri multiple rocket launchers began to strike the FAPLA 8 and 13 Brigades which had stopped to resupply. The MRL attack ended at daybreak with the Angolan Air Force searching for their positions during daylight hours, but the MRL attack failed to slow the Angolan brigades and they resumed their advance. By 15 September, all four brigades met south of the Lomba River, 30 km north west of Mavinga. UNITA and the SADF units had failed to slow or stop the advance. Meanwhile, far to the north, UNITA had to retreat south from Cazombo on the 19 September as FAPLA took the town. Over a number of nights, the SAAF evacuated at least a 1000 UNITA soldiers from that region, flying them and their equipment into Mavinga. Having learnt from SADF reconnaissance units around the Cuito Cuanavale airfield that the Angolan brigades were being supplied by helicopter, SAAF Atlas Impalas were sent to intercept these Mil Mi-17 and Mil Mi-25 helicopters when alerted to their movements by those reconnaissance units. Eventually the Angolans lost 10 helicopters and started using smaller Aérospatiale Alouette IIIs to resupply their forces. Ten Soviet advisors were also killed as they landed at Cuito Cuanavale after being intercepted by a SAAF Dassault Mirage F1.

By 2 October, the Angolan brigades were 10 km from Mavinga but had suffered heavy losses from UNITA attacks and the SADF MRLs. At this point FAPLA morale was low and with the evacuation of the Russian advisors the Angolan forces were beginning to desert. Over two days of air attacks by SAAF Impala and Mirage aircraft, ground bombardments from the MRLs and with reduced supply and unit fighting ability, the Angolan brigades were ordered to retreat westwards and then to head for Cuito Cuanavale. By 4 October, 32 Battalion units began to withdraw.

== Vital air support ==
The SAAF played a very important role in logistical support to the SADF Forces and UNITA against a coalition of Cuban and FAPLA troops moving in on Mavinga. The SAAF flew 310 night flying hours transporting mainly the Valkiri Multiple Launch Rocket System (MLRS) and their 127 mm rockets, ammunition and food; and performing Casualty Evacuation (Casevac) of wounded personnel. SAAF Lockheed C-130 Hercules, Transall C-160 and Douglas C-47 Skytrain aircraft were used.

== Aftermath ==
It was realised by the South Africans at the end of the operation that it would be impossible for UNITA forces to stop a combined Angolan and Cuban force and that Mavinga would have fallen had it not been for the assistance of the SADF. The Angolan forces back in their base, began to rebuild while waiting for the rainy season to end and resume Operation Congresso II. The South African's suffered one soldier accidentally killed, while 500 UNITA soldiers died and 1500 wounded with other sources claiming dead and wounded to be as high as 2500. Angolan casualty figures range from 1589 to 2500 to as high as 4719 soldiers killed. Soviet casualties are listed as 10 dead and 9 wounded, while the Cubans lost 56 men and 60 wounded.
