= Operation Askari =

1983 military operation in Angola

- Part of the South African Border War
- Location: Angola Operation Askari (Angola)
- Objective: Disrupt the logistical support and command & control capabilities of PLAN in order to suppress a large-scale incursion into South West Africa planned for January 1984.
- Date: 8 December 1983 – 13 January 1984
- Outcome: South African Success

Operation Askari was a military operation during 1983 in Angola by the South African Defence Force (SADF) during the South African Border War.

== Background ==
Operation Askari, launched on 6 December 1983, was the SADF's sixth large-scale cross-border operation into Angola and was intended to disrupt the logistical support and command & control capabilities of People's Liberation Army of Namibia (PLAN) the military wing of the South West Africa People's Organisation SWAPO, in order to suppress a large-scale incursion into South West Africa that was planned for the beginning of 1984. The People's Armed Forces for the Liberation of Angola (FAPLA) of the People's Movement for the Liberation of Angola (MPLA), the Angolan governing party, were targeted during this mission as PLAN bases were close to FAPLA bases and had been used as a place of refuge during SADF operations.

== Planning ==
Operation Askari was planned to begin on 9 November 1983 but was postponed for one month because the South African government was conducting talks with African leaders. The operation would instead begin on 9 December with four phases planned:

- The first phase involved placing special forces teams around Lubango, operating to gather intelligence for an SAAF attack known as Operation Klinker on 29 December, against a PLAN training base outside that town.
- Phase two consisted of reconnaissance, probing and attacks on the Angolan towns of Cahama, Mulondo and Cuvelai to force the FAPLA and PLAN troops to flee the towns during mid December to mid January.
- Phase three was the domination of the area of concern by the SADF. And
- The final phase, halting any infiltration of PLAN units through the area dominated into SWA/Namibia.

== Order of battle ==
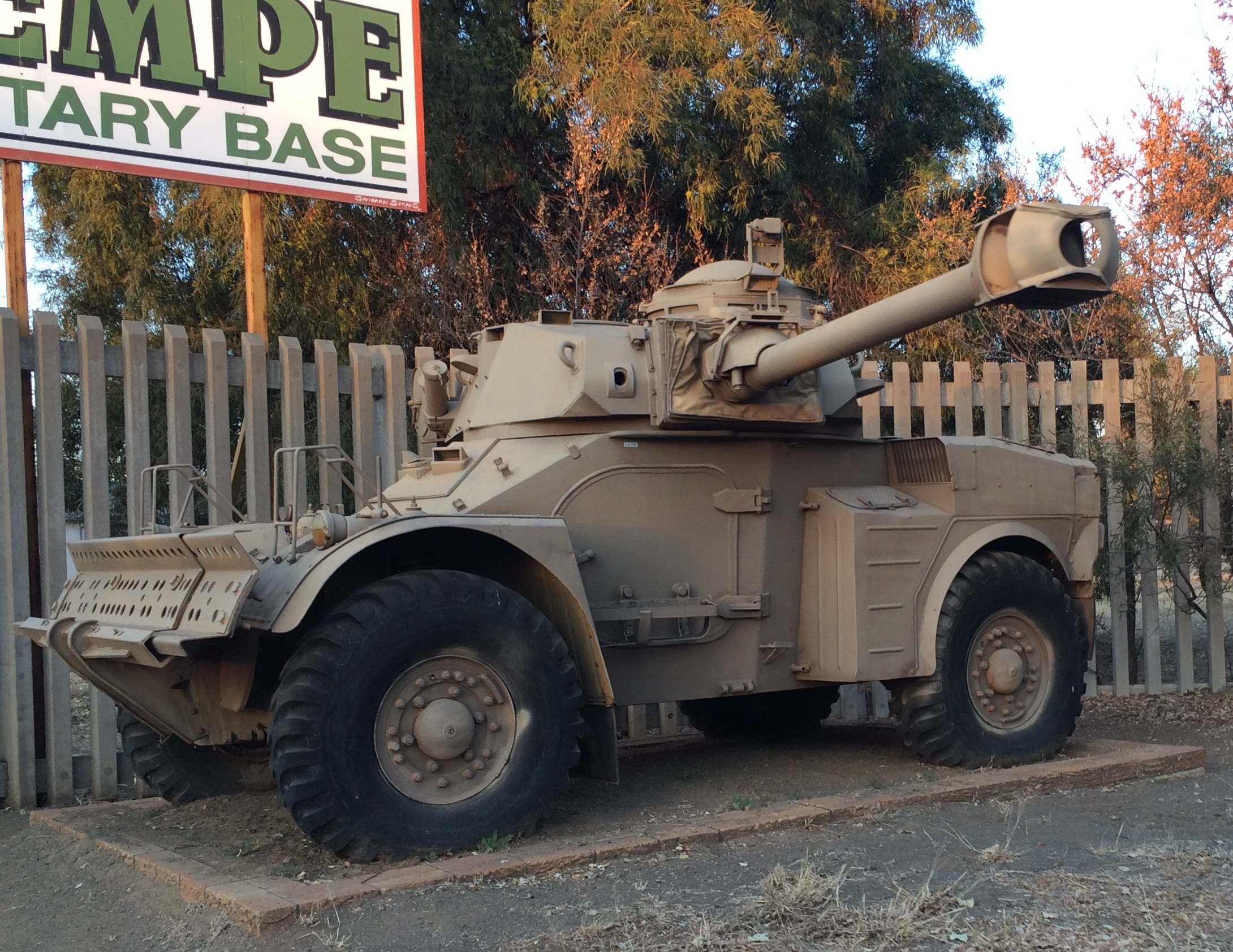
Eland-90 armoured car. Askari marked its final deployment in Angola with the SADF.

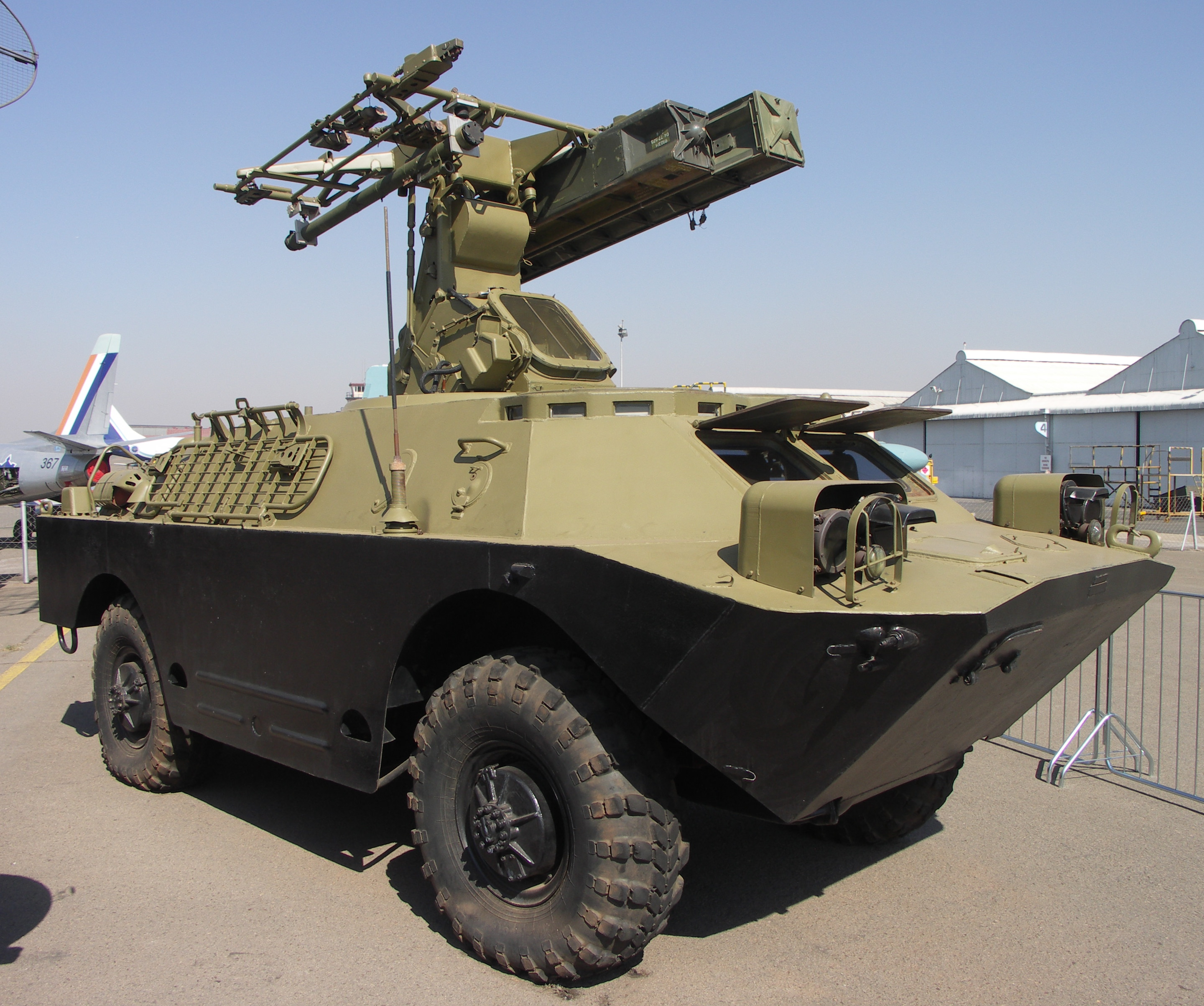
FAPLA 9K31 Strela-1 captured at Cuvelai during Askari.

=== South African and South West Africa Territorial forces ===
Operation commander - Brigadier Joep Joubert

Task Force X-Ray - Commandant Gert van Zyl / Commandant Ep van Lill / Commandant Welgemoed

- three mechanized companies - 61 Mech (plus 4 SAI and 8 SAI)
- one armoured car squadron – 1 SSB - Ratel 90
- two troops MRL – Valkiri MRLS
- one G-4 155mm battery
- one G-2 140mm battery
- two Ystervark 20mm AA battery (20mm AA guns where mounted on Samil 20)

Task Force Victor - Commandant Faan Greyling

- one mechanized company - 1 SAI
- one mechanized company - Regiment Groot Karoo / Regiment de la Rey
- one Eland-90 armoured car squadron - Regiment Mooirivier / Regiment Molopo
- one G-2 140mm battery
- one troop MRL – 4 SAI - Valkiri MRLS
- two anti-aircraft troops

Task Force Echo-Victor - Commandant Eddie Viljoen

- four motorized infantry companies - 32 Battalion

Task Force Tango

- one mechanized company - 4 SAI
- one armoured car squadron - 1 & 2 Special Service Battalion
- one troop 140mm G-2 artillery – 2 SAI

Combat Team Manie

- four platoons motorized infantry - 202 Battalion
- two platoons motorized infantry - 7 SAI
- one armoured car squadron
- one 81mm mortar platoon 6SAI/32BN
- one troop 120mm artillery (mortar)

=== FAPLA/SWAPO forces ===
Cahama

- 2nd Brigade
- Cuban battalion
- PLAN Western HQ

Mulondo

- 19th Brigade

Cuvelai

- 11 Brigade
- two Cuban battalions
- PLAN's Moscow, Alpha and Bravo battalions

Caiundo

- 53rd Brigade

== Battles ==
=== Battle of Quiteve ===
The objective for the towns of Quiteve and Mulondo was to conduct a probe of the town's defences by ground forces, attacking it with artillery and aircraft, in doing so intimidating the FAPLA forces into fleeing the town. Task Force X-Ray left Xangongo on 11 December with its first target at Quiteve taken on 12 December without much fighting as FAPLA had fled the town.

Two FAPLA tanks had been dispatched south from Mulondo towards Quiteve but were attacked by SAAF Mirages destroying one, while the other retreated. Task Force X-Ray then moved south west to Cahama.

=== Battle of Mulondo ===
After an advance by FAPLA infantry and tanks from Mulondo had been stopped by a SAAF air attack, a smaller SADF force called Combat Team Tango, was sent forward with artillery to the area around the town of Mulondo with the same objective that had been achieved with Quiteve. From around 16 December until around 15 January 1984, the SADF plan called for action to force FAPLA's 19th Brigade to withdraw from the area and position UNITA troops in their place.

During this phase, FAPLA used their own reconnaissance to track the small SADF force and were successful in attacking the South Africans with artillery, forcing the South Africans to withdraw frequently. This forced the SAAF to conduct air missions against this town, drawing away missions that were to be utilised against Cahama and Cuvelai. In one of these attacks on 23 December, an Impala strike aircraft was struck and damaged by a SA-9 surface-to-air missile but safely returned to its base at Ongiva.

The plan to take Mulondo failed and by the early January, a political decision had been made to end this part of Operation Askari. FAPLA's 19th Brigade maintained their nerve and stayed in place.

=== Battle of Cahama ===
The objective for the town of Cahama was again to conduct a probe of the towns defence's by ground forces, attacking it by artillery and by aircraft, in doing so intimidating the FAPLA and PLAN forces into fleeing their areas of control around the town.

The ground and air plan was to begin during mid December until mid January, but in reality, special forces teams were already operating, since mid November, around the town and to the north disrupting the enemies logistics route from Chibemba. PLAN headquarters to the west of Cahama was bombed by the SAAF in early December and remaining forces fled to the safety of FAPLA defences in the town.

The objective was the responsibility of Task Force X-Ray which moved into position on 16 December after leaving the town of Quiteve. Two teams positioned themselves to the east of the town while a third was positioned to the north. Bombing from the air and bombardment from artillery begun immediately on the town's defences. FAPLA artillery returned fire and artillery duels begun. Some of the air support was reduced when Task Force Mannie got into trouble in Caiundo. FAPLA, fearing that the combat team positioned north of the town meant a SADF attack towards Chimbemba and Lubango, launched an armoured column of tanks and personnel carriers towards Cahama. The attack by FAPLA T-55 tanks was fought off by the SADF Ratel-90's crews better mobility and training despite being undergunned.

A side operation known as Operation Fox was conducted to capture a SA-8 battery south west of Cahama. Making use of air and ground forces, the objective was to drive the battery away from the towns defence's to a better position for SADF ground and special forces to capture it intact.

The plan failed and by 31 December a political decision had been made, brought about by international pressure, to end this part of Operation Askari. FAPLA's 2nd Brigade had maintained their nerve and stayed in place. Task Force X-Ray then moved north east to Cuvelai to assist Task Force Victor.

=== Battle of Cuvelai ===
Task Force Victor, consisting mostly of citizen force soldiers, were tasked with probing and attacking a PLAN camp and a FAPLA brigade in and around Cuvelai. They moved from Mongua to Cuvelai and the probing of enemy positions began. By 28 December, plans were changed to wrap up Operation Askari by 31 December, which meant Task Force Victor's orders were to attack the PLAN camp a few miles north east of the town that was heavily defended and surrounded by minefields. After the attack began, the task force was counterattacked by FAPLA tanks from Cuvelai that had come to PLAN's defence. The attack was stopped by Eland-90s and artillery by a task force ill-equipped with antitank weapons. The enemy remained in place and the task force was then tasked to attack Cuvelai from the northeast. This attack went ahead in bad weather, flooded rivers, into prepared enemy minefields and against positions manned by 23mm AA guns backed by tanks. There were also problems in leadership by some junior SADF officers and refusal to follow orders by some soldiers. Commandant Greyling finally ordered a withdrawal but it turned into a disordered retreat and he was eventually able to regroup his task force. Greyling was ordered to re-attack but he refused without better planning and reconnaissance.

Brigadier Joubert made a decision to reinforce Task Force Victor for a final attack on Cuvelai. Task Force X-Ray arrived very tired at Cuvelai on 3 January, to reinforce Task Force Victor, after spending 16 hours marching from Cahama. Commandant van Lill took over command of Task Force Victor from Commandant Greyling for the joint attack planned for 4 January and had to deal with further "unrest" in the ranks of Victor. Enemy radio intercepts also reported requests for further FAPLA and Cuban reinforcements. Units were rearranged and an attack planned with Victor attacking Cuvelai from the south and X-Ray from the east.

On the afternoon of 3 January, the FAPLA positions in and around Cuvelai were attacked by the SADF in two waves. The first wave consisted of 10 Impalas and 4 Canberra bombers while the second wave consisted of Impala strike aircraft.The aim of the bombing raids were to destroy the FAPLA artillery and the anti-aircraft guns that would be used against the SADF armoured personnel carriers. SADF radio intercepts of the FAPLA garrisons reports to Lubango, reported losses of 75% of their artillery.

On 4 January, around 8am, the SADF attack began supported by artillery. The Ratel-20 personnel carriers had to cross minefields to reach the enemy positions and frequently retreated when encountering the hidden 23mm AA positions. The SADF artillery was supported by an Alloutte helicopter used in a spotter role, flown by Captain Carl Alberts, who won an Honoris Crux medal when he used his aircraft as bait to identify the 23mm AA gun positions. FAPLA counterattacked with ten T-55 tanks which succeeded in destroying a Ratel and killing six men, but the tanks were eventually driven off by artillery and finally destroyed by Ratel-90's in the afternoon. Another medal was won one by Lieutenant Alexander Macaskill trying to rescue the five men in the Ratel. Medic Private Matthew Joseph Fisher was also awarded the Honoris Crux for retrieving a mortally wounded rifleman during the advance on Cuvelai. By the late afternoon, most of the enemy positions were in SADF hands with the remaining FAPLA troops fleeing northwards towards Techamutete.

Earlier Combat Team Echo Victor had been tasked to clear PLAN positions north of Cuvelai and south of Techamutete. During this period, against orders, Techamutete was taken by the Echo Victor on 24 December after the town garrison fled but were then told to hold the town. After the final attack on Cuvelai on 3 January 1984, Combat Team Echo Victor was used as a stopper group against enemy forces fleeing that town. The retreating enemy forces from Cuvelai fled towards the town on 5 January only to be attacked by 32 Battalion. An anti-tank team was then detached from Combat Team Tango to support Echo Victor who had destroyed a fleeing T-54 tank, but they arrived late due to logistical issues. Operations continue in the Techamutete region, with all units, barr 32 Battalion, back at bases in SWA/Namibia by 13–15 January. Small SADF units remained in Calueque, N'Giva and Xangongo.

=== Battle of Caiundo ===
Combat Team Manie's role was to deceive the enemy as to where the real SADF attack would be coming from. Manie's target was the town of Caiundo. Combat Team Manie advanced from Rundu towards Caiundo where it began to probe the towns defences hoping, as was the plan, to frighten the FAPLA troops of the 53rd Brigade into fleeing the town. During one of these probes, a SADF platoon, who got too close the town, was discovered by a FAPLA reconnaissance team. On 18 December 1983, a FAPLA company attacked the platoon. Sources differ on the SADF casualties, with nine dead, one missing, one captured to as low as five dead and one captured. A vehicle, weapons, and equipment were seized by the Angolans. South African air assets were moved from their missions in Cuvelai to Caiundo. By the end of hostilities in January, the air and ground attacks had failed to dislodge FAPLA from the towns defenses. The captured black member of the SWATF was exchanged on 23 May 1984 for 30 Angolans and 1 Cuban.

== Aftermath ==
Both sides took casualties. On the Angolan side, FAPLA casualties were 426 killed and 3 captured, PLAN lost 45 killed and 11 captured, while the Cubans lost 5 killed and 1 captured.

SADF casualties were 21 killed in action while 4 died accidentally. 65 SADF men were wounded in action with another 18 wounded accidentally with 11 wounded in vehicle accidents for a total of 94 soldiers. The SADF captured vast amounts of Angolan equipment and supplies especially after the capture of the town of Cuvelai.

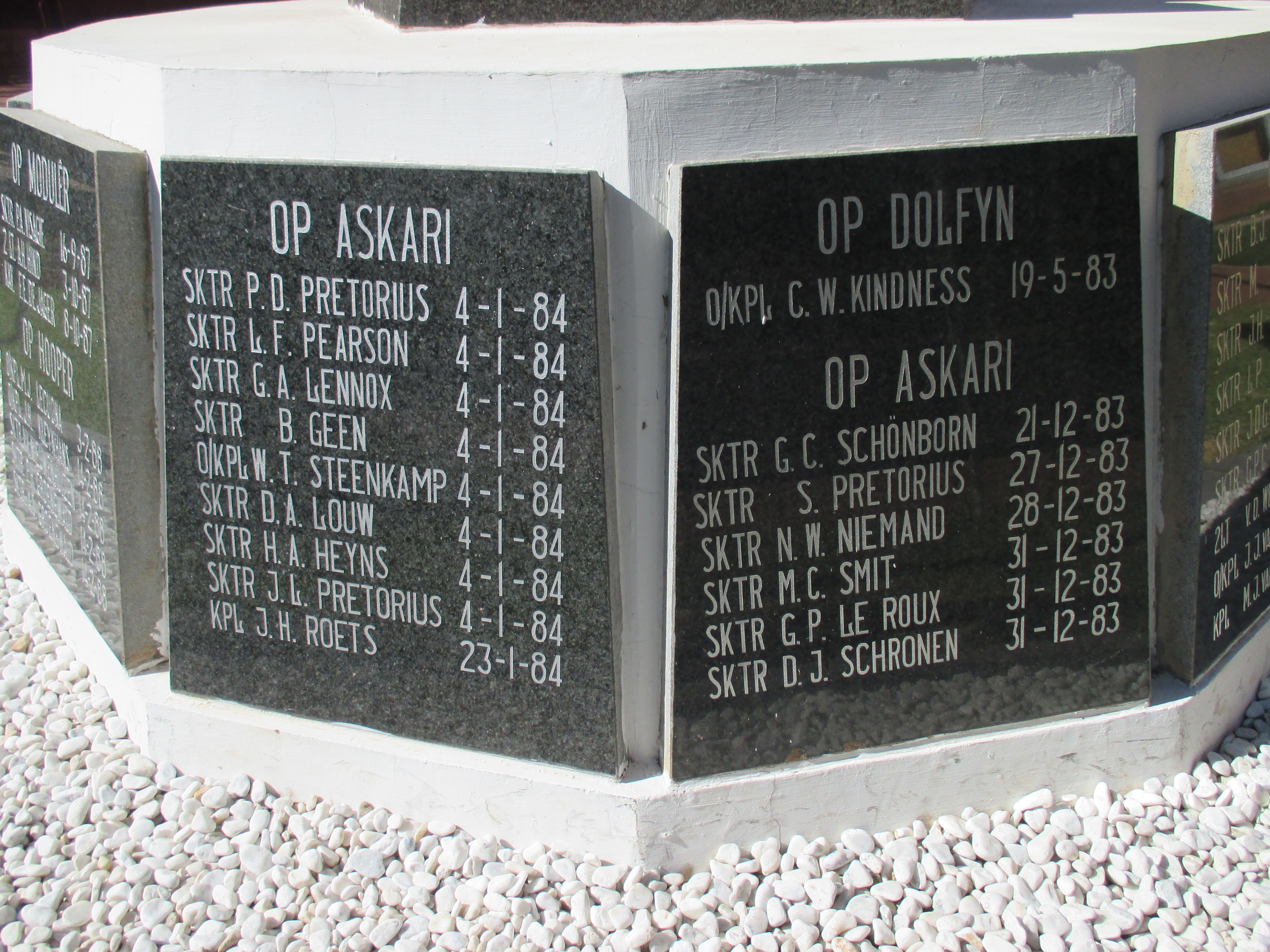
Roll of 61 Mechanised personnel killed during Askari.

== The Lusaka Accords and implementation of a Joint Monitoring Commission ==
By 5 January 1984, SWAPO's Sam Nujoma requested the UN Secretary General to arrange a ceasefire. With the help of the Americans, this was concluded between Angola and South Africa on 31 January. On 6 February, South Africa'South Foreign Minister Pik Botha proposed a Joint Monitoring Commission (JMC) to monitor withdrawals and violations of the ceasefire. Talks concluded with an agreement called the Lusaka Accords that detailed the formation and implementation of the JMC which after many weeks of disagreements, finally met on 3 May at N'Giva, Angola.

On 12 January 1984 in Moscow, the Soviets however decided to increase military aid to Angola, placing more modern military equipment in the country and increasing the radar network across southern Angola so as to reduce the SAAF's operating capability. This would take around fourteen months and would result in plan to attack UNITA in south-eastern Angola.
