= United Nations Security Council Resolution 602 =

UN Security Council Resolution 602
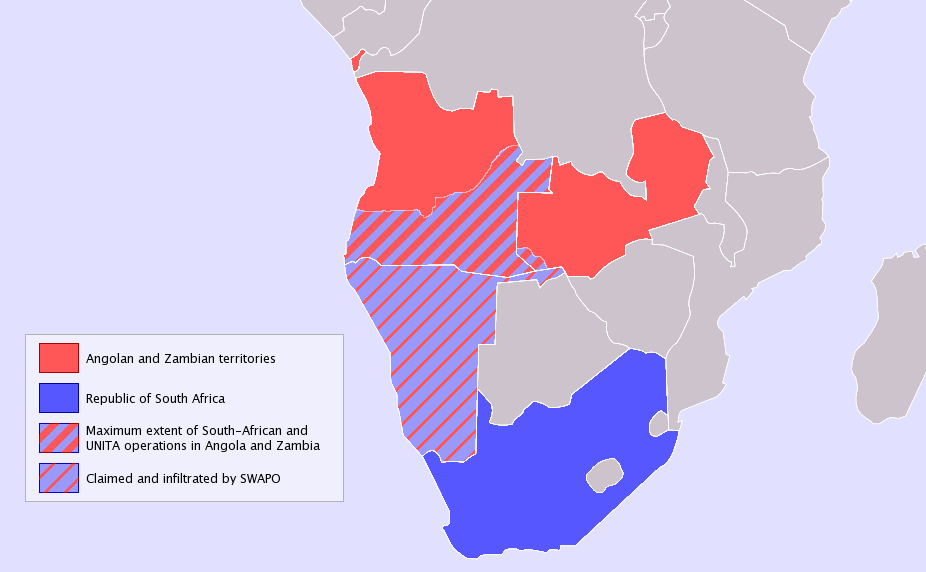
- South African military operations in Angola
- Date: 25 November 1987
- Meeting no.: 2,767
- Code: S/RES/602 (Document)
- Subject: Angola–South Africa
- Voting summary: 15 voted for; None voted against; None abstained
- Result: Adopted

Security Council composition
- Permanent members: China; France; Soviet Union; United Kingdom; United States
- Non-permanent members: Argentina; Bulgaria; Congo; Ghana; Italy; Japan; United Arab Emirates; Venezuela; West Germany; Zambia

United Nations Security Council resolution 602, adopted unanimously on 25 November 1987, after hearing representations from the People's Republic of Angola, the council recalled resolutions 387 (1976), 428 (1978), 447 (1979), 454 (1979), 475 (1980), 545 (1983), 546 (1984), 567 (1985), 571 (1985), 574 (1985) and 577 (1985), expressing its concern at the continuing military incursions into the country by South Africa through occupied South West Africa (Namibia).

The Council demanded South Africa cease Operation Moduler and respect Angola's sovereignty and territorial integrity, noting the "illegal entry of the head of the racist South African regime and some of his Ministers" into Angola. The representative of Ghana, which introduced the resolution, said the continued attacks were an affront to the council's authority. It called for a complete and unconditional withdrawal of South African forces from southern Angola, requesting the Secretary-General to monitor the implementation of the current resolution and reporting back no later than 10 December 1987.

The resolution was a direct rejection of South Africa's offer to withdraw its troops from Angola if other nations, such as Cuba, did the same.

== See also ==
- Angola – South Africa relations
- Cuban intervention in Angola
- South African Border War
- United Nations Security Council Resolution 606
- Operation Moduler
