= United Nations Security Council Resolution 574 =

UN Security Council Resolution 574
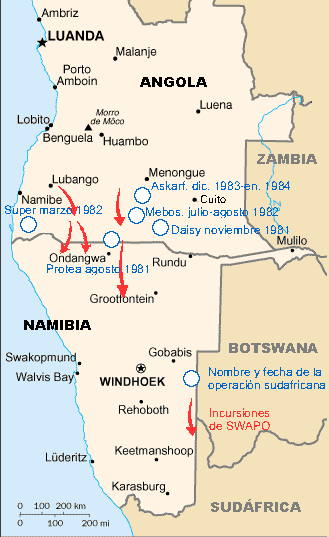
- South African border operations
- Date: 7 October 1985
- Meeting no.: 2,617
- Code: S/RES/574 (Document)
- Subject: Angola–South Africa
- Voting summary: 15 voted for; None voted against; None abstained
- Result: Adopted

Security Council composition
- Permanent members: China; France; Soviet Union; United Kingdom; United States
- Non-permanent members: Australia; Burkina Faso; Denmark; Egypt; India; Madagascar; Peru; Thailand; Trinidad and Tobago; Ukrainian SSR

United Nations Security Council resolution 574, adopted unanimously on 7 October 1985, after hearing representations from the People's Republic of Angola, the Council recalled resolutions 387 (1976), 418 (1977), 428 (1978), 447 (1979), 454 (1979), 475 (1980), 545 (1983), 546 (1984), 567 (1985) and 571 (1985), and expressed its concern at the continuing attacks on the country by South Africa through occupied South West Africa.

The Council demanded South Africa cease the attacks and respect Angola's sovereignty and territorial integrity, noting that Angola has the right of self-defense to defend its territory and is entitled to compensation for the attacks. The resolution demanded that South Africa withdraw immediately all its military forces from Angola. It also condemned South Africa for using occupied Namibia (then South West Africa) as a springboard for the attacks, urging all member states to implement the arms embargo imposed in Resolution 418 (1977) on South Africa.

Finally, the commission established in Resolution 571 (1985) consisting of Australia, Egypt and Peru was required to assess the damage caused by the recent attack.

== See also ==
- Angola – South Africa relations
- List of United Nations Security Council Resolutions 501 to 600 (1982–1987)
- South African Border War
- Apartheid
