= United Nations Security Council Resolution 571 =

UN Security Council Resolution 571
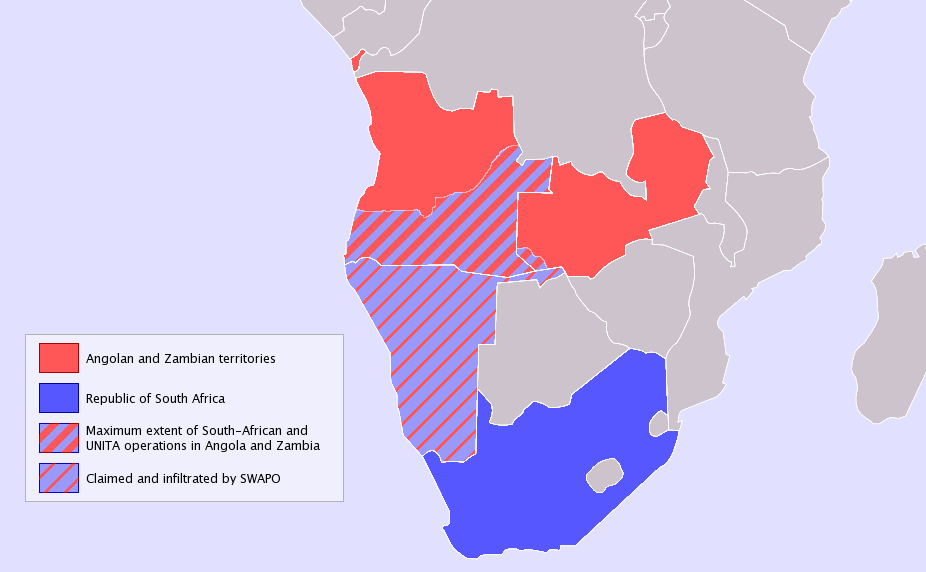
- South African border operations
- Date: 20 September 1985
- Meeting no.: 2,607
- Code: S/RES/571 (Document)
- Subject: Angola-South Africa
- Voting summary: 15 voted for; None voted against; None abstained
- Result: Adopted

Security Council composition
- Permanent members: China; France; Soviet Union; United Kingdom; United States
- Non-permanent members: Australia; Burkina Faso; Denmark; Egypt; India; Madagascar; Peru; Thailand; Trinidad and Tobago; Ukrainian SSR

United Nations Security Council resolution 571, adopted unanimously on 20 September 1985, after hearing representations from the People's Republic of Angola, the Council recalled resolutions including 387 (1976), 418 (1977), 428 (1978), 447 (1979), 454 (1979), 475 (1980), 545 (1983) and 546 (1984), and expressed its concern at the continuing attacks on the country by South Africa through occupied South West Africa.

The Council demanded South Africa cease the attacks and respect Angola's sovereignty and territorial integrity, noting that Angola is entitled to compensation for the attacks. The resolution demanded that South Africa withdraw immediately all its military forces from Angola. It also condemned South Africa for using occupied Namibia (then South West Africa) as a springboard for the attacks, urging all member states to implement the arms embargo imposed in Resolution 418 (1977) on South Africa.

Finally, Resolution 571 appointed a commission to visit Angola to investigate the circumstances and impact of the South African attack, reporting back no later than 15 November 1985, and in the meantime urged Member States to pressure the Government of South Africa to comply with previous resolutions.

== See also ==
- Angola – South Africa relations
- List of United Nations Security Council Resolutions 501 to 600 (1982–1987)
- South African Border War
- Apartheid
