= United Nations Security Council Resolution 567 =

UN Security Council Resolution 567
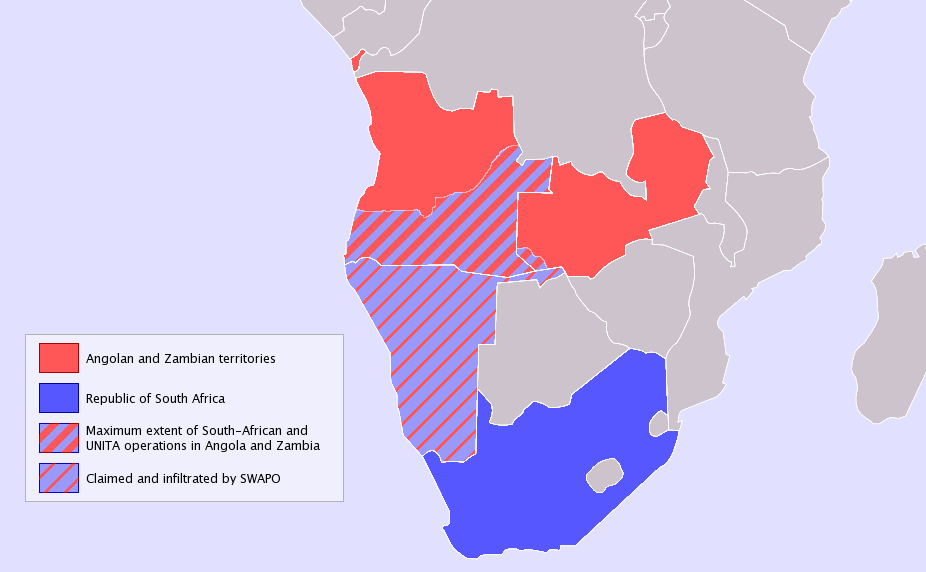
- South African border operations
- Date: 20 June 1985
- Meeting no.: 2,597
- Code: S/RES/567 (Document)
- Subject: Angola-South Africa
- Voting summary: 15 voted for; None voted against; None abstained
- Result: Adopted

Security Council composition
- Permanent members: China; France; Soviet Union; United Kingdom; United States
- Non-permanent members: Australia; Burkina Faso; Denmark; Egypt; India; Madagascar; Peru; Thailand; Trinidad and Tobago; Ukrainian SSR

United Nations Security Council resolution 567, adopted unanimously on 20 June 1985, after hearing representations from the People's Republic of Angola, the Council recalled resolutions including 387 (1976), 428 (1978), 447 (1979), 454 (1979), 475 (1980), 545 (1983) and 546 (1984), and expressed its concern at the continuing attacks on the country (in the province of Cabinda) by South Africa through occupied South West Africa.

The Council demanded South Africa cease the attacks and respect Angola's sovereignty and territorial integrity, noting that Angola is entitled to the right of self-defense and to compensation for the attacks. It also condemned South Africa for using occupied Namibia (then South West Africa) as a springboard for the attacks and requested the Secretary-General continue to monitor the situation.

== See also ==
- List of United Nations Security Council Resolutions 501 to 600 (1982–1987)
- South African Border War
- Apartheid
