= United Nations Security Council Resolution 546 =

UN Security Council Resolution 546
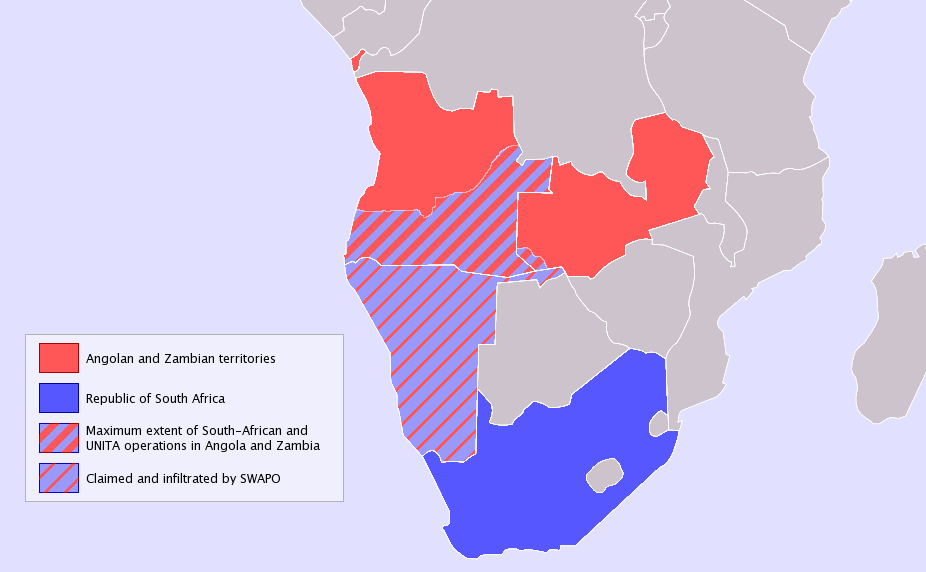
- South African border operations
- Date: 6 January 1984
- Meeting no.: 2,511
- Code: S/RES/546 (Document)
- Subject: Angola-South Africa
- Voting summary: 13 voted for; None voted against; 2 abstained
- Result: Adopted

Security Council composition
- Permanent members: China; France; Soviet Union; United Kingdom; United States
- Non-permanent members: Egypt; India; Malta; Netherlands; Nicaragua; Pakistan; Peru; Ukrainian SSR; Upper Volta; Zimbabwe

United Nations Security Council resolution 546, adopted on 6 January 1984, after hearing representations from the People's Republic of Angola, the council recalled resolutions 387 (1976), 428 (1978), 447 (1979), 454 (1979), 475 (1980) and 545 (1983), and expressed its concern at the continuing attacks on the country by South Africa through occupied South West Africa.

The Council demanded South Africa cease the attacks and respect Angola's sovereignty and territorial integrity, noting that Angola is entitled to the right of self-defense and to compensation for the attacks. It also called upon South Africa to cease the occupation of southern Angola and withdraw its forces. The resolution urged Member States to provide economic assistance to Angola, as well as enforce Resolution 418 (1977) on the arms embargo against South Africa. It also requested the Secretary-General continue to monitor the situation and report back to the council as appropriate.

The resolution was approved by 13 votes to none against, while the United Kingdom and United States abstained from voting.

== See also ==
- List of United Nations Security Council Resolutions 501 to 600 (1982–1987)
- South African Border War
- Apartheid
