= Operation Moduler =

1987 South African operation in the Angolan Civil War

- Part of the Battle of Cuito Cuanavale in the Angolan Civil War and the South African Border War
- Location: Angola Operation Moduler (Angola)
- Objective: Prevent FAPLA taking Mavinga from UNITA and later attempt to destroy FAPLA forces east of the Cuito River.
- Date: 4 August - 30 November 1987
- Executed by: South African Defence Force
- Outcome: South African and UNITA victory
- Casualties: FAPLA: 1659 dead, 2100+ wounded SADF: 37 killed, 88 wounded UNITA: 155 killed, 622 wounded

Operation Moduler (sometimes incorrectly called "Modular") was a military operation by the South African Defence Force (SADF) during the South African Border War. It formed part of what has come to be called the Battle of Cuito Cuanavale. The SADF objective was to halt a Soviet-backed counteroffensive by the People's Armed Forces of Liberation of Angola (FAPLA) on the contested settlement of Mavinga. The advance was halted with heavy Angolan casualties. The South African forces and its UNITA allies then began offensive operations against the Angolan forces, who had retreated back to a defensive line east of the Cuito River with the objective of destroying them once and for all.

== Background ==
During January 1987, FAPLA forces began to increase their air defence network in the Cuito Cuanavale region and by April they had begun to assemble a large force of Soviet-supplied tanks, APCs, trucks and a large number of helicopters and fighter and strike aircraft at the town which indicated the build-up of a new offensive on UNITA. By May UNITA was discussing the situation with the South Africans and by June, SADF military intelligence teams were operating with UNITA teams to monitor the Angolan build up. On 2 June 1987, four combined-arms FAPLA units (the 47th, 59th, 16th and 21st brigades), departed from the Angolan town of Cuito Cuanavale to capture the UNITA stronghold at Mavinga, which was the gateway to UNITA's capital of Jamba. The offensive was planned by Soviet lieutenant general Pyotr Gusev and code named Operation Saluting October (alternatively translated as Salute to October). The FAPLA force was accompanied at the brigade level by Soviet military advisers.

By 15 June, the SADF had formulated a plan to deploy units of 32 Battalion and Valkiri MRLs, for a covert operation similar to Operation Wallpaper, and have the remaining units of 32 Battalion and 61 Mechanised Battalion on standby for an attack on the Angolan brigades. On 22 June, Operation Moduler came into operation with Colonel Jock Harris of 32 Battalion in command but the forces would not be directly involved in the combat and by mid-July, more of 32 Battalion units were ordered to Mavinga with his complete force in place by early August.

== Order of battle ==
=== South African and South West Africa Territorial Forces from August 1987 ===
- 32 Battalion - five companies - Colonel Jock Harris
- three reconnaissance teams
- one battery MRL
- one battery 120 mm (4.7 in) mortars
- two 20 mm (0.79 in) mobile anti-aircraft units.

=== South African and South West Africa Territorial Forces from 5 September 1987 ===
20 Brigade - Colonel Deon Ferreira
Battle Group Alpha - Commandant Kobus Smit

- one mechanised company - 61 Mech
- one motorized company - 32 Battalion
- one armoured car squadron - Ratel-90
- one 81 mm mortar platoon - 4 Ratels
- one 20mm mobile anti-aircraft unit

Battle Group Bravo - Commandant Robbie Hartslief

- one motorized company - 32 Battalion
- two motorized company - 101 Battalion
- one motorized platoon - 32 Battalion
- one armoured car squadron - Ratel-90
- one 81 mm mortar platoon - 4 Ratels

Battle Group Charlie - Major Dawid Lotter

- one mechanised company - 61 Mech
- one anti-tank platoon
- one 81 mm mortar platoon - 4 Ratels

20 Artillery Regiment

- Q Battery - G5 155 mm howitzers, 4 Stinger teams UNITA, two SA-7 AA teams, 8 14.5mm AA guns, two platoons 32 Battalion
- P Battery - MRLs plus, one company 32 Battalion, 20 mm AA troop, 2 Stinger teams UNITA, two SA-7 AA teams
- S Battery - 120 mm mortars plus one platoon 32 Battalion

=== South African and South West Africa Territorial Forces from 23 October 1987 ===
Brigadier Fido Smit – Overall Commander

Task Force 10 – Colonel Deon Ferreira
Combat Group Alpha – Commandant Mike Muller

- 2 x Mechanised Infantry Companies – 61 Mech
- 1 x Ratel 90 squadron
- 1 x 81mm Mortar platoon
- 1 x AA platoon
- 1 x Engineer Troop
- 1 x Assault Pioneer Platoon
- 1 x UNITA Battalion

Combat Group Charlie – Commandant Leon Marias.

- 2 x Mechanised Infantry Companies – 4SAI 62 mech
- 2 x Motorised Infantry Companies – 32 Battalion
- 1 x Ratel 90 squadron
- 1 x 81mm Mortar platoon
- 1 x 120mm Mortar battery
- 1 x Tank Squadron (13 Olifant tanks)
- 1 x Engineer Troop (2 Field Engineer Regt)
- 1 x UNITA Battalion
- 1 x 20mm mobile anti-aircraft unit

UNITA Liaison Team – Colonel Fred Oelshig

Mobile Air Operations Team – Major Brian Daniel (SAAF 89 Combat Flying School)

20 Medical Task Force – Commandant John Lubbe

20 Artillery Regiment – Colonel Jean Lausberg

- Q Battery - 8 G5s
- S Battery - 8 G5s and 8 120 mm mortars
- J Troop - 3 G6s
- P Battery - 8 MRLs
- I troop - 4 MRLs

Combat Group Bravo – Commandant Robbie Hartslief

- 2 x Mechanised Infantry Companies – 32 Battalion
- 2 x Motorised Infantry Companies – 101 Battalion
- 1 x Anti-Tank Squadron
- 1 x UNITA Battalion
- 1 x Company 701Bn

=== UNITA ===
- three Regular Battalions
- four Semi-regular Battalions

=== FAPLA/Cuban forces ===
- 16 Brigade
- 21 Brigade
- 47 Brigade
- 59 Brigade

Reserve

- two brigades - West of Cuito & guarding Menongue road and convoys
- one brigade - Cuito Cuanavale
- one brigade - East of Cuito at Tumpo

== SADF begins its defensive operations ==
The South Africans began Operation Moduler on 13 August with Sierra Battery unleashing 120 mm mortar fire on the 47 and 59 Brigades halting their advance at Catato Woods. On 16 August the South African forces were given permission to release their G5 battery and a Ratel-90 anti-tank squadron for operations on the Lomba River. On the early morning of 20 August, South African Valkiri MRLs opened fire on FAPLA forces at Catato Woods alerting the Angolans for the first time that the South African were assisting UNITA. This rocket firing would continue for the next five days on the FAPLA brigades. During this period the Ratel-90 anti-tank squadron was advancing north to Mavinga while between 26 and 28 August, SAAF C-130s flew in the eight G5 battery and their support equipment for deployment to the Lomba River region.

Between 24 and 28 August, a special forces team from 4 Reconnaissance Regiment were sent on a mission called Operation Coolidge. Its objective was the destruction of the bridge over the Cuito River that was used to move FAPLA logistics from Cuito Cuanavale to the brigades to the south-west on the Lomba River. The special forces were dropped off by helicopters 40 km north of the bridge and rowed down the Cuito to the bridge in canoes. After partially setting their demolition charges the team was discovered but managed to escape leaving the bridge partially damaged and unable to be used by vehicles. The team were chased back to their rendezvous point by Angolan troops leap-frogging ahead by helicopters. Despite faulty helicopters, bad weather and Angolan troops, the team was eventually picked up and returned to Rundu. For the first time on 26 August, a SADF forward observer was able to see 47 and 59 Brigade's positions and see the effect of the Valkiri MRL fire on them. The artillery fire was slowing but not halting their advance and this meant the South African MRLs and their protection force eventually had to be moved south of the Lomba River to ensure they weren't cut off.

On 28 and 29 August, SADF planners met at Rundu and a decision was made to send 61 Mechanised Battalion to assist 32 Battalion, released two companies from 101 Battalion and allocated the resources of the SAAF to the operation. With UNITA unable or unwilling to slow the advance of the FAPLA brigades, the Angolans began a fast advance to the Lomba on 29 August which saw them move 40 km in two days. Two kilometres east of the Cunzumbia/Lomba confluence lay a bridge which 21 Brigade would need to cross the Lomba River and they came within 9 km north-west of the objective. 59 Brigade crossed eastwards over the Cuzizi River using Russian bridging equipment and stopped 6 km north of the Cunzumbia/Lomba confluence while 47 Brigade had moved westward to the source of the Lomba River. 32 Battalion and it's Valkiri MRLs moved to the southeast of Lomba/Cuzizi confluence to engage 47 Brigade while its Ratel-90 anti-tank squadron and mortars moved to within 5 km of the same area with the G5s positioned 18 km southeast of the Cunzumbia/Lomba confluence to engage 21 Brigade. On 31 August the South African forces engaged the FAPLA brigades with Valkiri MRLs rockets fired at 47 Brigade halting its advance while later that evening the G5s fired on 21 Brigade halting their advance. 61 Mechanised Battalion's commander Commandant Bok Smit met 32 Battalion's Colonel Jock Harris on 2 September and they would plan the arrival and positioning of 61 Mech forces in the coming days.

A 32 Battalion reconnaissance team was sent behind enemy lines with a forward artillery observer to direct the South African G5 artillery fire and were in position by 2 September while another team had located 16 and 47 Brigade exact position by 4 September. Flying an artillery observation officer on the night of 3 September, a SAAF Bosbok light aircraft was intercepted and shot down by a SA-8 south of the Lomba River killing the two occupants. With the South African force now called 20 Brigade, Colonel Deon Ferreira took command on 5 September with the force divided into Battle Groups Alpha, Bravo and Charlie with units from 20 Artillery Regiment divided between them as necessary. By 7 September, 61 Mechanised Battalion had now reached an area 25 km south-west of Mavinga.

UNITA scouts reported that FAPLA's 21 Brigade was attempting a crossing of the Lomba/Gomba River 12 km east of Cunzumbia on 9 September. Combat Group Bravo sent its Ratel 90 anti-tank squadron forward with a company from 101 Battalion and they encountered a fording BTR-60 that they destroyed but FAPLA artillery counter-attack and it forced the South African units to withdraw 6 km away.

The detached unit of Combat Group Bravo returned on 10 September to the fording site on the Lomba River and again attacked elements of 21 Brigade, but the Angolans' counter-attacked sending in three tanks. The Ratel-90s failed to stop the tanks' advance, so the new Ratel ZT3s were brought into the battle, firing seven missiles with four successful strikes on the tanks. MiG aircraft then arrived over the battle site and forced the South African units to withdraw but they had stopped 21 Brigade's advance.

47 Brigade, based at the source of the Lomba River, moved two battalions with three tanks eastwards to try to make contact with 59 Brigade. On 13 September, the SADF countered this advance by sending two companies from 101 Battalion, eight Ratel-90s and four Ratel ZT3s westwards to meet the FAPLA battalions. Artillery attacked the FAPLA positions first before the small SADF unit attacked and stopped the advance with FAPLA battalions losing 200 dead or wounded but the Angolan tanks led a counter-attack on the Ratels, killing seven SADF soldiers before losing five of their own tanks. The small SADF unit called in their reserve, Combat Group Charlie, and heavy fighting continued for several more hours before a withdrawal was called when further FAPLA tanks were summoned and 101 Battalion company's cohesion broke down and some fled the battle. 47 members of the unit would later be discharged from the army after that event because they were concerned about their deployment against tanks and use as UNITA's "mercenaries". The same SADF unit would again encounter the FAPLA tanks around midnight and destroyed two tanks before withdrawing again.

On 16 September, Combat Group Alpha (61 Mech) began its attack in the early morning but its movement was slowed by dense bush and only encountered elements of 47 Brigade who by this time knew the South Africans were coming so by later afternoon Alpha withdrew with no success losing one killed and three wounded. The SAAF kept up the pressure on 47 Brigade with three attacks on 21 September by four Buccaneers around 08h50, four Mirages around 13h00 and four Buccaneers around 17h50. The SAAF conducted a strike against 21 Brigade on 25 September but they missed the target by 200 m but SADF artillery continued their bombardment and the FAPLA brigade took heavy losses. The SAAF sent six Mirage F1CZs to attempt to intercept Angolan MiG-23s on 27 September with one Mirage suffering tail damage from an Angolan air-to-air missile. It returned to SWA-Namibia but crash-landed at the airfield.

47 Brigade received orders on 28 September to cross the Lomba River and meet up with 59 Brigade and then move eastwards crossing the Cunzumbia River and link up with 21 Brigade but the orders were changed later and 21 Brigade was ordered to withdraw north-eastwards. Later that night, President PW Botha, Defence Minister Magnus Malan and the generals flew into Mavinga and met Deon Ferreira and his officers the following day for a briefing. President Botha decided on a more offensive operation and the release of any SADF forces required to destroy the remaining FAPLA brigades east of Cuito Cuanavale.

On 30 September, 47 Brigade attempted to link up with 59 Brigade but their advance was forced back by a SADF artillery bombardment. Plans had been made to attack 47 Brigade on 5 October but radio intercepts reported that FAPLA was about to move from their position, so on 3 October, Combat Group Charlie was ordered to attack with air and artillery support, four UNITA battalions and a 32 Battalion company in reserve. Around 10h17, the Ratel-90s caught the Angolan soldiers crossing the river while the South Africans were attacked by tanks and ZU-23 anti-aircraft guns and the Angolan MiGs flying in support of the ground troops but failed in destroying any SADF vehicles. The South Africans withdrew to resupply around 12h00 and resumed their attack from 14h00 with the Angolans now attempting to retreat across the river taking even more casualties but the battle was over by 17h00. SAAF aircraft attacked 59 Brigade during the day preventing the brigade from coming to the aid of 47 Brigade.

The FAPLA casualties were around 600 killed, the loss of a dozen tanks and vehicles and 47 Brigade no longer a cohesive unit while the SADF lost one soldier killed and a Ratel destroyed and captured a highly sophisticated SA-8 anti-aircraft missile system – the first time the weapon had fallen into western hands. The same day saw plans formulated for 32 Battalion to send units to attack and disrupt the FAPLA supply lines between Menongue and Cuito Cuanavale.

== FAPLA retreats from the Lomba River region ==
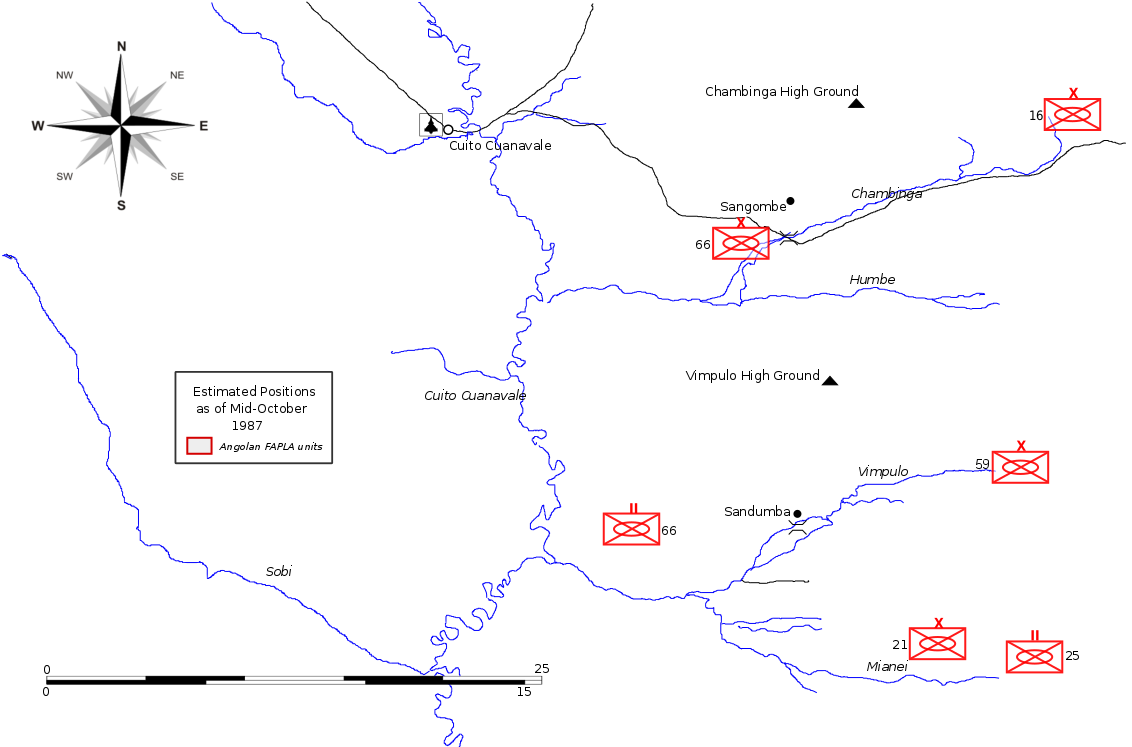
Estimated FAPLA positions after the Lomba River retreat

FAPLA's remaining forces were given orders to retreat on 5 October and began their movement northwards from the Lomba River region. After the end of this phase of fighting, FAPLA had lost 61 tanks, 53 BTR-60s, 7 BMP-1s, 23 BRDM-2s, 20 BM-21s, 1059 soldiers dead and 2118 wounded. The SADF lost 3 Ratels, 2 Casspirs, 1 Bosbok, 1 UAV, 17 soldiers killed and 41 wounded. UNITA casualties are unknown.

10 October saw the remnants of 47 Brigade retreat north-west to the source of the Cunzumbia River and were joined by 16 and 21 Brigade. Angolan MiGs patrolled the skies above the South African units on 11 October and launched sporadic attacks but no damage or casualties are recorded. Cuito Cuanavale was subject of a SADF artillery attack on 14 October and in response 59 Brigade was sent to find and attack the battery and the South Africans responded to that threat by sending Battle Group Alpha to intercept the FAPLA brigade. At the same time, Task Force Delta was positioned on the Vimposto high ground to prevent 16 or 66 FAPLA Brigades from coming to 59 Brigades aid.

18 October saw a command change in the SADF with Brigadier Fido Smit of 7 SA Division taking overall command of the operation while Commandant Deon Ferreira stayed in tactical command of 20 Brigade with Task Force Delta disbanded and their 32 Battalion units merged into Combat Group Bravo. 4 SAI arrived at Rundu from Middleberg on 20 October. The same day saw the SADF artillery in position south of the Mianei River and would begin to shell Cuito Cuanavale for several weeks and the airfield outside the town and would eventually abandon all flights of aircraft. 20 Brigade is renamed Task Force 10 on 23 September with Ferreira remaining in command of the newly named unit comprising Combat Groups Alpha and Charlie. After a ten-day journey from Rundu, 4 SAI under Commandant Leon Marais arrived outside Mavinga on 30 October with thirteen Olifant tanks and became part of Combat Group Charlie.

FAPLA now positioned its brigades in a defence line east of the Cuito River stretching north to the south. In the north, 16 Brigade was positioned at the source of the Chambinga River, 66 Brigade guarding the bridge over the Chambinga River, 59 Brigade at the source of Vimpulo River, a 66 Brigade battalion at a position were the Mianei River joins the Cuito, a 25 Brigade battalion at the source of Mianei River, and to west along the same river lay 21 Brigade.

== Second phase begins - SADF on the offensive ==
59 Brigade between the Vimpulo and Mianei Rivers, sent out two armoured columns to find the location of the SADF's G5 artillery position on 1 November. The artillery battery moved to get away from the threat but became stuck in sand and called for assistance. Combat Group Bravo, who was close by, was sent forward as was a 61 Mechanised Battle Team from Mavinga that consisted of a mechanized infantry company and a Ratel-90 platoon under Major Dawid Lotter and they found the enemy within 2 km of the stuck guns. The battle started around 20h00 and soon ended with FAPLA withdrawing with heavy casualties and the guns dug out and moved. The SAAF retaliated with a Mirage attack on the positions of 59 Brigade on 2 November, the group responsible for previous nights attack.

In the days leading up to 9 November attack, the SAAF conducted sorties against 16 Brigade positions with Mirages and Buccaneers to keep the FAPLA unit in place. The planned attack called for three attacks. The first attack would be against 16 Brigade that was in position around the source of the Chambinga River by Combat Group Charlie (4SAI) and their tanks with Combat Group Alpha (61 Mech) leading a diversionary attack. In the south, 21 Brigade based around the north of the Mianei River would be the target of diversionary attack by Combat Group Bravo (32 Battalion). A third attack would take place on the airfield at Menongue and would be conducted by UNITA, its aim to disrupt FAPLA air attacks against the attack on 16 Brigade.

The 7 November saw the SADF Tactical HQ moved up from Mavinga to Combat Group Charlie's position that was 45 km east of 21 Brigade and the Task Force 10 commander and his officers finalised the plan and its coordination. All other Groups were at their start-up positions on this day. November 8 saw the SADF units complete their last-minute repairs and replenishment while the Tactical HQ moved later that evening south and then to the west close to the positions of Combat Group Alpha.

== SADF attack on 16 Brigade ==
The attack began at 01h00 on 9 November with Combat Group Alpha moving to position themselves to the south of 16 Brigade, while Combat Group Charlie started to move to its positions north at 04h00. SADF mortar and artillery began to shell the enemy while a 06h30 bombing by SAAF Mirages kept the pressure on FAPLA. The main attack unit, Combat Group Charlie, was 4 km northeast from 16 Brigade around 06h00. At 07h00 Combat Group Alpha began its diversionary attack on 16 Brigade from the south, with the brigade responding by preparing their tanks to attack the group. Combat Group Alpha withdrew and became the task force reserve. Combat Group Charlie's attack was led by a company from 32 Battalion with UNITA troops and became pinned down by machine gun and 23 mm anti-aircraft guns, followed too far behind by 4SAI and UNITA troops who were moving too slowly due to dense bush and trees. Meanwhile, FAPLA prepared an ambush for 4SAI's left flank consisting of 3 tanks, various AA guns and APCs, but 4SAI was receiving confusing intelligence by UNITA about the preparations but the SADF recces sorted out the confusion, allowing 4SAI to prepare a counter-ambush when it released its tank squadron and a mechanized company. During this battle, FAPLA would lose 2 tanks and various AA guns and MRLS as the attack is beaten off with the help of the SADF G5s and G6 artillery. This attack ended around 09h00 with 22 FAPLA dead and 2 prisoners with valuable intelligence gained from captured maps. Combat Group Charlie resumed its attack at 10h00 against two FAPLA battalions with ten tanks and various AA guns but they were pinned down when they received accurate enemy artillery fire and would lose two 4SAI soldiers and one from 32 Battalion. The SADF companies were unpinned when their artillery responded to the enemy attack but a Ratel-20 company became entangled with two tanks. One was destroyed by the Ratel, which in turn was destroyed by the second tank. Two soldiers were killed in the Ratel with a further two killed from wounds inflicted during the engagement. The second tank itself was destroyed by a SADF tank. The 32 Battalion company came under a threat on their right flank from FAPLA tanks so 4SAI's tanks flanked to the right and engaged the enemy. At 11h00 Combat Group Charlie came under attack by Mig-23 attack aircraft. 4SAI companies began to clear the bunkers and trenches and FAPLA forces started to flee and by 12h30 the main battle was over. At this point the commander of Combat Group Charlie ordered a withdrawal to the deployment point as they were short of ammunition and needed resupply, a decision the SADF Tactical HQ was not happy with and allowed 16 Brigade to reorganize themselves and to get away from the South African forces. Casualties for FAPLA at the end of battle were 75 killed and 6 prisoners, the loss of 10 tanks and various equipment with 14 SA-7 and SA-14 weapons captured while the SADF lost 7 killed and 9 wounded.

Around 18h00, two battalions of 21 Brigade and the one battalion 59 Brigade aided by tanks left their positions and attacked Combat Group Bravo who had attacked these units earlier in the day in a diversionary attack, but the SADF group withdrew from a fight under instructions to avoid the tanks.

== Attacks resume against 16 Brigade ==
10 November saw Combat Group Charlie resting in a position 15 km east of the Cunzumbia River. Around 15h00, Combat Group Charlie resumed its attack on 16 Brigade but at last light was unsuccessful after being slowed by MiG bombing attacks, observation of their attack by FAPLA reconnaissance and a shooting incident within the unit. The SADF Tactical HQ now moved to Catato Bush on the night of 10/11 November and would be subject to a Mig-23 bombing during the day. The same evening 59 Brigade had begun its withdrawal from its position between the Humbe and Vimpulo rivers across the Chambinga crossing while 16 Brigade was reinforced with tanks.

The next attack would be the following day, 11 November. The plan called for three attacks. Combat Group Bravo would keep 21 and 59 Brigades engaged while Combat Group Alpha would engage 16 Brigade positions from the north-east, drawing the tanks away in a diversionary move. It would then become the SADF reserve and Charlie would lead the main attack from the south.

The attack began at 06h00 with SADF artillery attacking the northern units of 16 Brigade giving them the impression that it was the target and this impression was followed up by SAAF Mirage bombing on the same positions at 07h00. Charlie's attack resumed around 10h00 as it had again been held up by poor navigation through thick bush and MiG bombing runs taking one wounded and this allowed FAPLA to withdraw some of its units in the south. They soon come up against two battalions, ten tanks and artillery. After resting Charlie regained the momentum around 12h25 when six Mirages bomb 16 Brigade positions but are then counter-attacked by the enemy infantry and artillery but is eventually beaten back with the loss of 2 killed and eight wounded. Charlie resumes the attack supplemented with Ratel-90 and tanks and drew heavy enemy artillery and MRLs before getting stuck in minefields. Charlie was then ordered to withdraw around 15h30 being short of ammunition so Combat Group Alpha resumed the attack but is not successful and the battle ends around 18h00 when both parties withdraw. Early morning of the same day, saw an accidental explosion of an artillery round in a G5 gun which killed 2 SADF gunners and badly wounded another eight.

Casualties at the end of this day are recorded as FAPLA 394 dead and 14 tanks destroyed while the SADF saw 5 dead and 19 wounded. The recovery, under fire and in a minefield, of a crippled tank and the subsequent re-entry into a minefield to rescue a wounded soldier, earned Captain Petrus van Zyl and Lieutenant De Villers de Vos of 32 Battalion both Honoris Crux decorations. Combat Group Bravo to the south attacked 59 Brigade to prevent its northward retreat but when 21 Brigade comes to its aid, both brigades are able to withdraw. Radio intercepts around 14/15 November reported that 16 Brigade no longer existed as a cohesive unit as the soldiers had deserted to Cuito Cuanavale.

== 21 Brigade withdraws ==
12 November had the SADF and UNITA soldiers resting and replenishing, with the South Africans now becoming short of mechanical spares and consumables. The SADF logistics network was hindered by the distance between South Africa and the battle sites, the inability to stockpile close to the battles due to the SADF units perpetual movement and insufficient logistics vehicles to move the supplies. MiG bombing attacks continued on the units throughout the day but were not successful and the SADF artillery continued to target the Mianei and Chambinga crossings but they to were subject wear and tear of continuous fire and so slowing fire.

By the afternoon of 13 November, FAPLA caught the South Africans by surprise when their recces spotted the rapid and controlled retreat of 21 Brigade with the single battalion of 25 Brigade from their positions north of the Mianei River and moved northwards to the Sandumba ford over the Vimpulo River. On the same day, three SADF G6 self-propelled artillery moved onto the Chambinga high ground and caught FAPLA by surprise when they began to shell Cuito Cuanavale but would only do so for two days before technical issues with the equipment began to hinder them.

By 14 November Combat Group Charlie is ordered to move rapidly 20 km south-west to trap and prevent the two FAPLA units from crossing the Vimpulo into the ground between the Vimpulo and Humbe Rivers. Joined by Alpha, the two units catch 21 Brigade, slowed by G5 artillery, around 16h00 but FAPLA evades them. Combat Group Charlie is now ordered to move into within 2 km of the crossing point to ambush 21 Brigade but due to some issue ends up 6 km away and the FAPLA brigade slips past the SADF unit and by the morning of 15 November had crossed the river, while Alpha patrolled the ground between the Mianei and Vimpulo rivers left behind by 21 Brigade for any stragglers.

== FAPLA's race for the Chambinga Bridge ==
The night of 15 November saw 21 and 25 Brigades attempt to cross the Hube river as a shortcut to the Chambinga crossing point but the ground was too marshy. The brigades could not find a crossable point over the Hube so it was decided to follow to the river through the Viposto high ground to the Hube source in the east and round it and back westward to the high grounds south of the Chambinga river crossing. Combat Team Charlie's plan was to intercept 21 Brigade as it rounded the Hube on 16 November and so left its position at Vimpulo river and rounded its source and headed for the area of Hube river's source. Combat Team Bravo would be its reserve.

Instead of an interception, Charlie met them head-on between and 10h00 10h30, after failing to deploy properly. In the first ninety-minute battle the SADF forces lost three soldiers and two vehicles. Ratel-20 infantrymen from 4SAI, Ratel-90s, Olifant tanks and Unita troops engaged the enemy who countered with mortar, BM-21 Stalin Organs and tanks as the SADF tried to force the enemy out of the tick bush and trees into the floodplains.

The battle lasted until 16h30 with Combat Team Bravo joining Charlie after engaging further tanks before withdrawing twelve kilometres when they ran short of ammunition and fuel. Using SADF artillery to keep 21/25 Brigade in place, SADF reconnaissance units saw them begin preparing defensive positions but the brigades organised themselves and were able to round the Hube during the replenishment and hidden by a thunderstorm. FAPLA lost 131 soldiers, seven tanks and various vehicles while the SADF lost 6 soldiers with 19 wounded, and two Ratels and two other vehicles. UNITA itself took terrible casualties.

FAPLA's plan for the 17 November had the 21/25 Brigades dug into the high ground between the sources of the Chambinga and Hube rivers defending the approach to the bridge crossing, allowing 16 Brigade to cross the river with 59 Brigade managing the crossing. The SADF plan had the G5 artillery trapping FAPLA at the bridge while an attack would be made by Combat Group Alpha and elements of tanks and two 32 Battalion companies from Combat Group Charlie. The landscape around the southern Chambinga river crossing consisted of a one kilometre floodplain called an anhara with forest to the south were the FAPLA forces hid while the bridge crossing itself consisted of a TMM mobile bridge with log laid approach roads over the marshy ground.

17 November saw the SADF again advance westwards to the Chambinga crossing point with Combat Group Alpha leading the attack, Combat Group Bravo south-east at the source of the Humbe River and Charlie replenishing and in reserve. SADF artillery units targeting the bridge crossing consisted of G-5s, MRl and 120 mm mortars while a SADF forward artillery observer, Lieutenant Koos Breytenbach, watched, protected by UNITA troops. The artillery began to engage the enemy with fragmentation shells as it moved to cross the anhara in the early morning.

Alpha stepped off at 08h30 but its progress was hindered by UNITA's faulty intelligence concerning a minefield which slowed it down to a halt while the ground ahead was inspected. Alpha was hindered as it approached its attack on 21 and 25 Brigades as the bush was extremely thick and the armoured vehicles were unable to move fast. 21 and 25 Brigades on hearing their approach began to retreat and combined with MiG air patrols stopped the SADF artillery firing and the combat units approach which allowed 21 Brigade to retreat to the bridge and fords, with only Bravo engaging small elements of the brigade's rearguard three kilometres from the bridge. Combat Group Alpha arrived at the bridge by 17h00 but 21 Brigade had escaped.

59 Brigade held its nerve and had succeeded in managing the passage of the remains of 21 Brigade across the Chambinga bridge and the three fords despite constant attacks from the G-5 artillery. At the end of the day, Task Force 10 had retreated back to the east, resting, safe from MiG attacks the SADF thought would happen at the battle site the next day. SADF artillery continued to engage targets identified while UNITA forces patrolled the controlled areas. That evening FAPLA would recross the bridge and began retrieving damaged and stranded vehicles.

== Further plans discussed ==
On 18 November in Pretoria, General Jannie Geldenhuys, General Koos Liebenberg and Admiral Dries Putter gathered to discuss the options for the next course of action. Liebenberg placed three options on the table. One, withdraw the SADF forces and end Operation Moduler or secondly attack and take the bridge over the Cuito or lastly attack Cuito Cuanavale from the west as opposed to operations taking place currently to the east of the town. The third option had been discussed by the generals on 2 November, but would require another brigade on the western side of the river that would have to be made up of Citizen Force units who could only be ready for operations by the earliest 20 December. The 18 November meeting resolved nothing and on 22 November General Geldenhuys flew into Task Force 10's Angolan headquarters where a decision was made for a plan to attack the FAPLA forces at Chambinga. While the SADF forces rested, repaired and resupplied, FAPLA began to resupply and dug in to defend their positions.

== Attack on Chambinga Heights ==
With the demobilisation date of the SADF national servicemen fast approaching on 15 December, a plan was hatched for one last attack on the remains of the FAPLA forces situated on the Chambinga Heights with the intention of forcing them to flee west across the Cuito river to Cuito Cuanavale. General Jannie Geldenhuys and other senior officers flew to the Tactical Headquarters on 22 November and a plan was finalized for an attack. The plan called for the Task Force 10 to begin the attack with Battle Group Alpha attacking from the north with intention of fooling the enemy into believing it was the main attack, while two regular UNITA battalion, the 3rd and 5th, were the main attack moving in a westerly direction along the river followed up by Battle Group Bravo with E squadrons tanks and Battle Group Charlie in reserve to take the Cuito bridge. FAPLA forces were made up of the remains of five brigades of 4000 to 5000 soldiers and forty tanks while the SADF forces consisted of around 3000 soldiers and 13 tanks. The heights favoured a defence plan aided by thick vegetation and sand so FAPLA forces dug in with their morale raised with the arrival of 300 Cuban soldiers. The battle took place on 25 November and did not go well for the South African forces. The attack was to begin at 06h30 but was delayed when UNITA failed to turn up on time. Due to heavy bush and trees, the SADF armoured vehicles found it difficult to turn their turrets and the vegetation hindered proper navigation. UNITA forces took heavy casualties by the afternoon as they pushed the FAPLA forces back into alternative positions. Battle Group Bravo's advance was slowed by minefields and MiG fighter-bombers overhead and by 15h00 had only moved 800 m in four hours but by 17h00 was finally able to start its attack only to be stopped by heavy FAPLA artillery fire and due to the lateness of the hour retreated until the next day. The 26 November saw Battle Group Charlie reattached their tanks and led the attack with 4th UNITA Regular Battalion and Battle Group Bravo in reserve. Charlie's attack was again held up by minefields and dense vegetation, FAPLA re-enforcements of 10 tanks, further MiG bombing attempts and heavy FAPLA artillery fire while UNITA's attack petered out due to the latter's fire and so a decision was made to end the attack and withdrew to the east and with it the close of Operation Moduler. By 30 November, Task Force 10 began its withdrawal back to Rundu via Mavinga with its Tactical Headquarters back at Mavinga by 5 December.

== Casualties ==
At the conclusion of the final phase of Operation Moduler, FAPLA casualties were estimated at 525 killed with the loss of 28 tanks, 10 BTR-60s, 85 other vehicles and 3 SA-13 anti-aircraft missile systems while the SADF was said to have lost 16 soldiers with 41 wounded.

The Soviet military contingent attached to FAPLA suffered 3 dead and 5 wounded during Operation Moduler. Most of these casualties were sustained by the advisers attached to 21 Brigade, which suffered 1 dead and 4 wounded in a single South African artillery strike on September 28.

== Aftermath ==
Operation Moduler achieved the objective of halting the FAPLA advance against UNITA at Mavinga and inflicted heavy losses on FAPLA. After the FAPLA offensive had been stopped, the South African/UNITA force went on the offensive but failed to push them across the Cuito River before 30 November deadline, thus ending Operation Moduler and beginning Operation Hooper. FAPLA forces would later withdraw westward from the Chambinga heights taking up positions around Tumpo.

== See also ==
- 32 Battalion (South Africa)
- Angolan Civil War
- List of operations of the South African Border War
- United Nations Security Council Resolution 602
- United Nations Security Council Resolution 606

== Bibliography ==
- de Vries, Roland (2013). Eye of the Storm. Strength lies in Mobility. Tyger Valley: Naledi. ISBN 978-0-9921912-5-2.
- Gleijeses, Piero (2013). Visions of Freedom: Havana, Washington, Pretoria, and the Struggle for Southern Africa, 1976–1991. United States: The University of North Carolina Press. ISBN 978-1-4696-0968-3.
- Kinnear, James (3 September 2021). "Clash of Armour II". Key Publishing. Archived from the original on 21 July 2022.
- Nortje, Piet (2004). 32 Battalion: The Inside Story of South Africa's Elite Fighting Unit. Cape Town: Zebra Press. ISBN 978-1-86872-914-2.
- Scholtz, Leopold (2013). The SADF in the Border War. 1966-1989. Cape Town: Tafelberg. ISBN 978-0-624-05410-8.
- Tokarev, Andrei; Shubin, Gennady (2011). Bush War: The Road to Cuito Cuanavale: Soviet Soldiers' Accounts of the Angolan War. Auckland Park: Jacana Media (Pty) Ltd. pp. 128–148. ISBN 978-1-4314-0185-7.
- Vanneman, Peter (1990). Soviet Strategy in Southern Africa: Gorbachev's Pragmatic Approach. Stanford: Hoover Institution Press. ISBN 978-0-8179-8902-6.
