= United Nations Security Council Resolution 577 =

UN Security Council Resolution 577
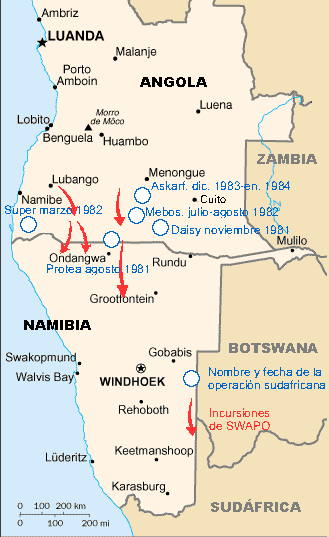
- South African border operations
- Date: 6 December 1985
- Meeting no.: 2,631
- Code: S/RES/577 (Document)
- Subject: Angola-South Africa
- Voting summary: 15 voted for; None voted against; None abstained
- Result: Adopted

Security Council composition
- Permanent members: China; France; Soviet Union; United Kingdom; United States
- Non-permanent members: Australia; Burkina Faso; Denmark; Egypt; India; Madagascar; Peru; Thailand; Trinidad and Tobago; Ukrainian SSR

United Nations Security Council resolution 577, adopted unanimously on 6 December 1985, after reaffirming Resolution 571 (1985), the Council endorsed a report by the Security Council Commission of Investigation, condemning the regime in South Africa for its continued and unprovoked attacks against the People's Republic of Angola through the occupied territory of South West Africa.

The resolution demanded South Africa withdraw its troops from Angolan territory and to respect the sovereignty of Angola. The Council reaffirmed the right of Angola to claim compensation for the attacks due to the loss of life and damage to property. It also, once again, urgently requested Member States and international organisations assist in the reconstruction of economic infrastructure in Angola.

Finally, the Council required the Secretary-General to submit a report on the implementation of the current resolution no later than 30 June 1986.

== See also ==
- Angola – South Africa relations
- List of United Nations Security Council Resolutions 501 to 600 (1982–1987)
- Namibian War of Independence
- South African Border Wars
- South Africa under apartheid
