= United Nations Security Council Resolution 606 =

UN Security Council Resolution 606
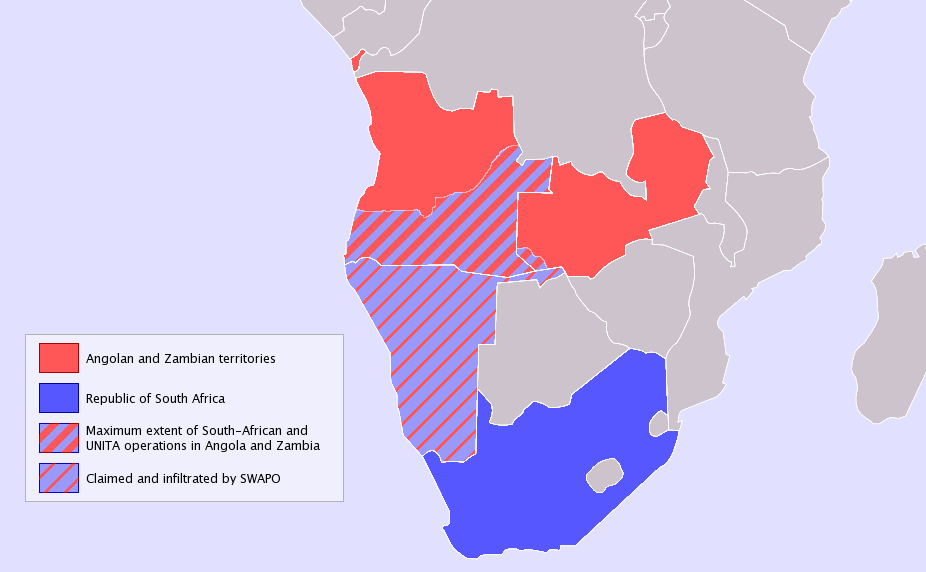
- South African border operations
- Date: 23 December 1987
- Meeting no.: 2,778
- Code: S/RES/606 (Document)
- Subject: Angola-South Africa
- Voting summary: 15 voted for; None voted against; None abstained
- Result: Adopted

Security Council composition
- Permanent members: China; France; Soviet Union; United Kingdom; United States
- Non-permanent members: Argentina; Bulgaria; Congo; Ghana; Italy; Japan; United Arab Emirates; Venezuela; West Germany; Zambia

United Nations Security Council resolution 606 was adopted unanimously on 23 December 1987, after recalling Resolution 602 (1987) and noting the Secretary-General's report authorised by that resolution. The Council condemned South Africa for its continued occupation of southern parts of the People's Republic of Angola and for its delay in withdrawing its forces from the area.

The Council then requested the Secretary-General to continue monitoring the total withdrawal, with a view to obtaining a full-time frame from South Africa. It also requested him to report back at the earliest date regarding the withdrawal.

The draft Resolution 606 was submitted by Argentina, the Congo, Ghana, the United Arab Emirates and Zambia. The representative from Angola present said that while South Africa was announcing its withdrawal, it was, in fact, reinforcing its positions, while the South African Defence Force said it could not provide a timetable.

== See also ==
- Angola – South Africa relations
- List of United Nations Security Council Resolutions 601 to 700 (1987–1991)
- South African Border War
- Apartheid
