= United Nations Security Council Resolution 545 =

UN Security Council Resolution 545
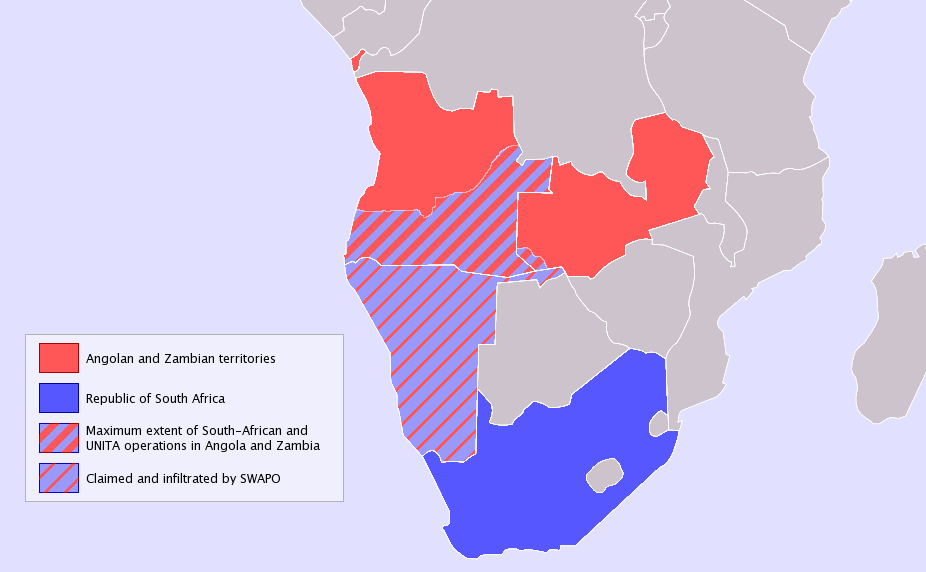
- South African border operations
- Date: 20 December 1983
- Meeting no.: 2,508
- Code: S/RES/545 (Document)
- Subject: Angola-South Africa
- Voting summary: 14 voted for; None voted against; 1 abstained
- Result: Adopted

Security Council composition
- Permanent members: China; France; Soviet Union; United Kingdom; United States
- Non-permanent members: Guyana; Jordan; Malta; Netherlands; Nicaragua; Pakistan; Poland; Togo; Zaire; Zimbabwe

United Nations Security Council Resolution 545 was adopted on 20 December 1983; after hearing representations from the People's Republic of Angola, the Council recalled resolutions 387 (1976), 428 (1978), 447 (1979), 454 (1979) and 475 (1980), and expressed its concern at the continuing attacks on the country by South Africa through occupied South West Africa.

The council demanded South Africa cease the attacks and respect Angola's sovereignty and territorial integrity, called upon South Africa to cease the occupation of southern Angola and withdraw its forces, and requested the Secretary-General continue to monitor the situation and report back to the council as appropriate.

The resolution was approved by 14 votes to none, while the United States abstained.

== See also ==
- List of United Nations Security Council Resolutions 501 to 600 (1982–1987)
- South African Border War
- Apartheid
