= United Nations Security Council Resolution 475 =

UN Security Council Resolution 475
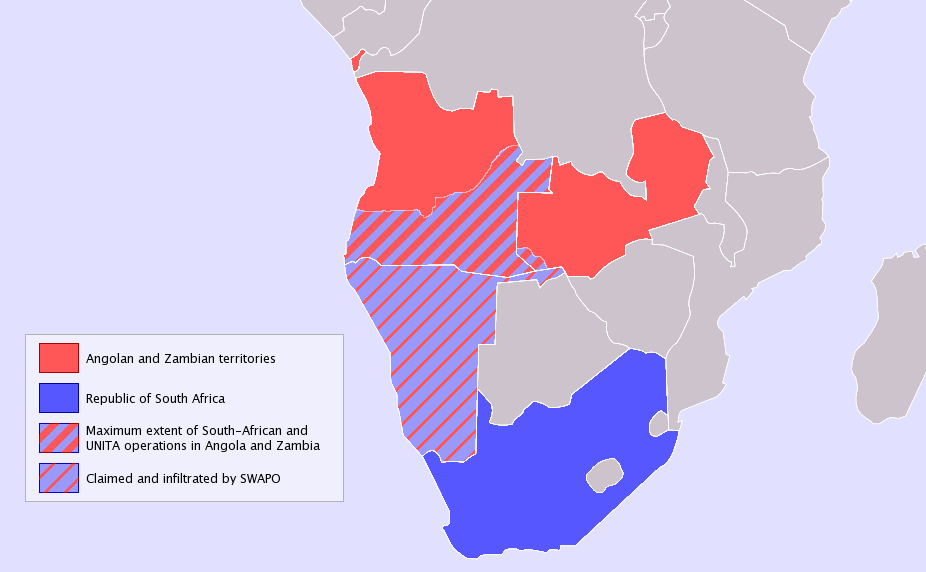
- South African border operations
- Date: 27 June 1980
- Meeting no.: 2,240
- Code: S/RES/475 (Document)
- Subject: Angola–South Africa
- Voting summary: 12 voted for; None voted against; 3 abstained
- Result: Adopted

Security Council composition
- Permanent members: China; France; Soviet Union; United Kingdom; United States
- Non-permanent members: Bangladesh; East Germany; Jamaica; Mexico; Niger; Norway; Philippines; Portugal; Tunisia; Zambia

United Nations Security Council resolution 475, adopted on 27 June 1980, after hearing representations from the People's Republic of Angola, the Council recalled resolutions 387 (1976), 447 (1979) and 454 (1979), and expressed its concern and condemned the continuing attacks on the country by South Africa through occupied South West Africa.

The Council demanded South Africa cease the attacks and respect Angola's sovereignty and territorial integrity. It also called upon South Africa to cease using the territory of South West Africa to launch attacks against Angola and other African states. The resolution requested that Member States to enforce Resolution 418 (1977) and offer immediate assistance to Angola in order to strengthen its defence capabilities.

The resolution was approved by 12 votes to none; France, the United Kingdom and United States abstained.

== See also ==
- List of United Nations Security Council Resolutions 401 to 500 (1976–1982)
- Namibian War of Independence
- Apartheid
