= United Nations Security Council Resolution 454 =

UN Security Council Resolution 454
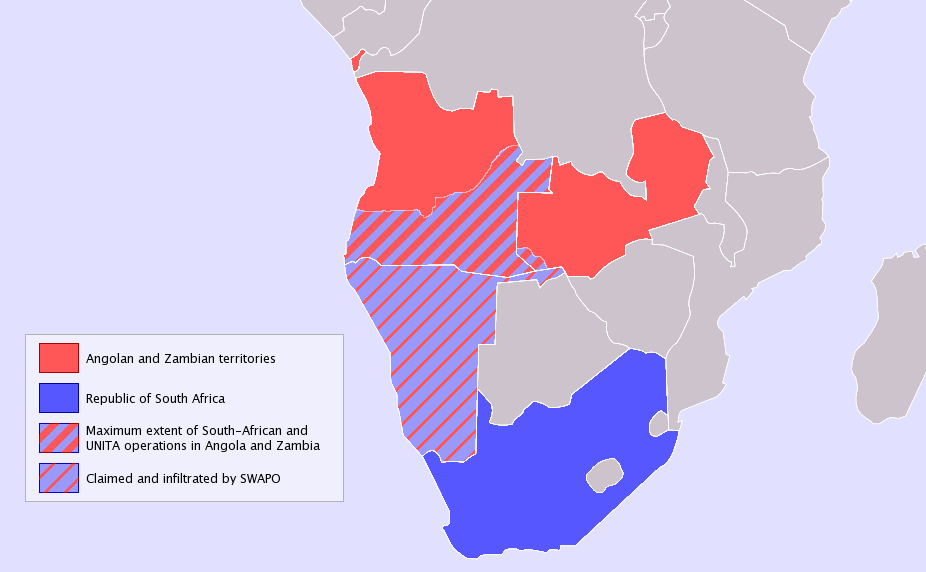
- South African border operations
- Date: 2 November 1979
- Meeting no.: 2,170
- Code: S/RES/454 (Document)
- Subject: Angola–South Africa
- Voting summary: 12 voted for; None voted against; 3 abstained
- Result: Adopted

Security Council composition
- Permanent members: China; France; Soviet Union; United Kingdom; United States
- Non-permanent members: Bangladesh; Bolivia; Czechoslovakia; Gabon; Jamaica; Kuwait; Nigeria; Norway; Portugal; Zambia

United Nations Security Council resolution 454 was adopted on 2 November 1979. After hearing representations from the People's Republic of Angola, the Council recalled resolutions 387 (1976) and 447 (1979), noting its concern and condemned the continuing attacks on the country by South Africa through illegally-occupied South West Africa.

The Council demanded that South Africa cease the attacks and respect Angola's sovereignty and territorial integrity. It also called on South Africa to cease using the territory of South West Africa to launch attacks against Angola and other African states. The resolution requested that Member States offer immediate assistance to Angola to strengthen its defence capabilities.

The resolution was approved by 12 votes to zero, with France, the United Kingdom and United States abstaining.

== See also ==
- List of United Nations Security Council Resolutions 401 to 500 (1976–1982)
- Namibian War of Independence
- Apartheid
