= Angola–South Africa relations =

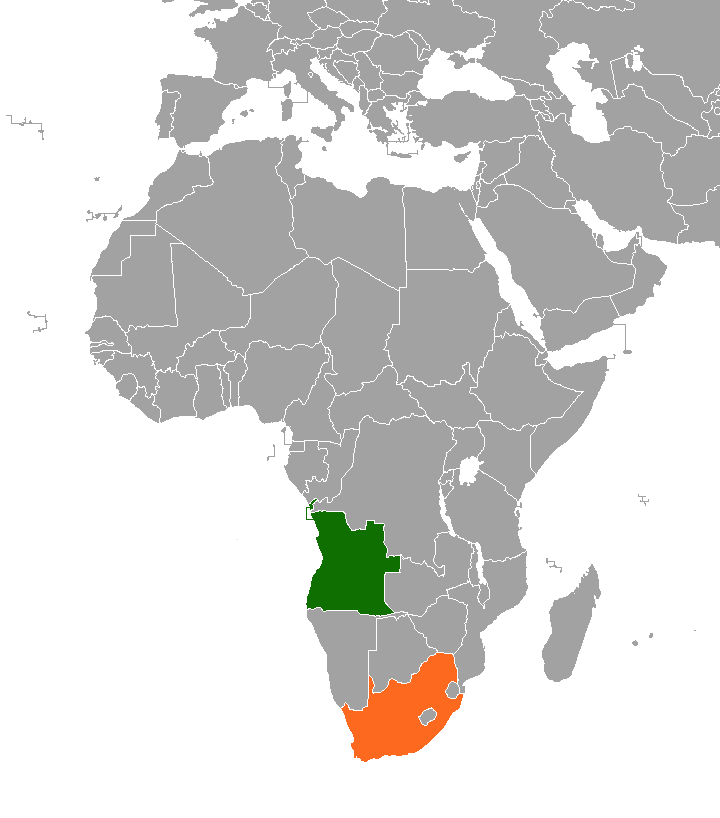
- Angola: South Africa

Relations between Angola and South Africa in the post-apartheid era are quite strong as the ruling parties in both states, the African National Congress in South Africa and the MPLA in Angola, fought together during the Angolan Civil War and South African Border War. They fought against UNITA rebels, based in Angola, and the apartheid-era government in South Africa which supported them. Nelson Mandela mediated between the MPLA and UNITA during the final years of the Angolan Civil War. Although South Africa was preponderant in terms of relative capabilities during the late twentieth century, the recent growth of Angola has led to a more balanced relation.

== 1970s ==
The South African government informed rebel leaders Jonas Savimbi and Holden Roberto in early November 1975 that the South African Defence Force (SADF) would soon end operations in Angola despite the coalition's failure to capture Luanda and therefore secure international recognition at independence. Savimbi, desperate to avoid the withdrawal of the largest, friendly, military force in Angola, asked General Constand Viljoen to arrange a meeting for him with South African Prime Minister John Vorster, Savimbi's ally since October 1974. On the night of November 10, the night before independence, Savimbi secretly flew to Pretoria, South Africa and the meeting took place. In a remarkable reversal of policy, Vorster not only agreed to keep troops through November but promised to withdraw the SADF troops only after the OAU meeting on December 9. The Soviets, well aware of South African activity in southern Angola, flew Cuban soldiers into Luanda the week before independence. While Cuban officers led the mission and provided the bulk of the troop force, 60 Soviet officers in the Congo joined the Cubans on November 12. The Soviet leadership expressly forbid the Cubans from intervening in Angola's civil war, focusing the mission on containing South Africa.

In 1975 and 1976 most foreign forces, with the exception of Cuba, withdrew. The last elements of the Portuguese military withdrew in 1975 and the South African military withdrew in February 1976. On the other hand, Cuba's troop force in Angola increased from 5,500 in December 1975 to 11,000 in February 1976. FNLA forces were crushed by Operation Carlota, a joint Cuban-Angolan attack on Huambo on January 30, 1976. By mid-November, the Huambo government had gained control over southern Angola and began pushing north.

On July 5, 1979, Angolan President Agostinho Neto issued a decree requiring all citizens to serve in the military for three years upon turning the age of eighteen. The government gave a report to the UN estimating $293 million in property damage from South African attacks between 1976 and 1979, asking for compensation on August 3, 1979. The Popular Movement for the Liberation of Cabinda, a Cabindan separatist rebel group, attacked a Cuban base near Tshiowa on August 11.

== 1980s ==
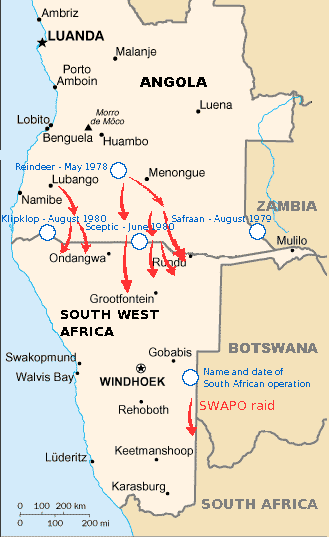
SWAPO's and South Africa's operations (1978–1980)

In the 1980s, fighting spread outward from southeastern Angola, where most of the fighting had taken place in the 1970s, as the African National Congress (ANC) and SWAPO increased their activity. The South African government responded by sending troops back into Angola, intervening in the war from 1981 to 1987, prompting the Soviet Union to deliver massive amounts of military aid from 1981 to 1986. In 1981, newly elected United States President Ronald Reagan's U.S. assistant secretary of state for African affairs, Chester Crocker, developed a linkage policy, tying Namibian independence to Cuban withdrawal and peace in Angola.

The South African military attacked insurgents in Cunene Province on May 12, 1980. The Angolan Ministry of Defense accused the South African government of wounding and killing civilians. Nine days later, the SADF attacked again, this time in Cuando-Cubango, and the MPLA threatened to respond militarily. The SADF launched a full-scale invasion of Angola through Cunene and Cuando-Cubango on June 7, destroying SWAPO's operational command headquarters on June 13, in what Prime Minister Botha described as a "shock attack". The Angolan government arrested 120 Angolans who were planning to set off explosives in Luanda, on June 24, foiling a plot purportedly orchestrated by the South African government. Three days later, the United Nations Security Council convened at the behest of Angola's ambassador to the UN, E. de Figuerido, and condemned South Africa's incursions into Angola. President Mobutu of Zaire also sided with the MPLA. The Angolan government recorded 529 instances in which South African forces violated Angola's territorial sovereignty between January and June 1980.

Cuba increased its 35,000-strong troop force in Angola from 35,000 in 1982 to 40,000 in 1985. South African forces tried to capture Lubango, capital of Huíla province, in Operation Askari in December 1983.

=== Democratic International ===
On June 2, 1985, American conservative activists held the Democratic International, a largely symbolic meeting of anti-Communist militants, at UNITA's headquarters in Jamba. Primarily funded by Rite Aid founder Lewis Lehrman and organized by anti-Communist activists Jack Abramoff and Jack Wheeler, participants included Savimbi, Adolfo Calero, leader of the Nicaraguan Contras, Pa Kao Her, Hmong Laotian rebel leader, U.S. Lieutenant Colonel Oliver North, South African security forces, Abdurrahim Wardak, Afghan Mujahideen leader, Jack Wheeler, American conservative policy advocate, and many others. While the Reagan administration, though unwilling to publicly support the meeting, privately expressed approval. The governments of Israel and South Africa supported the idea, but both respective countries were deemed inadvisable for hosting the conference.

The United States House of Representatives voted 236 to 185 to repeal the Clark Amendment on July 11, 1985. The Angolan government began attacking UNITA later that month from Luena towards Cazombo along the Benguela Railway, taking Cazombo on September 18. The government tried unsuccessfully to take UNITA's supply depot in Mavinga from Menongue. While the attack failed, very different interpretations of the attack emerged. UNITA claimed Portuguese-speaking Soviet officers led government troops while the government said UNITA relied on South African paratroopers to defeat the government. The South African government admitted to fighting in the area, but said its troops fought SWAPO militants.

UNITA forces attacked Camabatela in Cuanza Norte province on February 8, 1986. ANGOP alleged UNITA massacred civilians in Damba in Uíge Province later that month, on February 26. The South African government agreed to Crocker's terms in principle on March 8. Savimbi proposed a truce regarding the Benguela railway on March 26, saying MPLA trains could pass through as long as an international inspection group monitored trains to prevent their use for counter-insurgency activity. The government did not respond. The Angolan and American governments began negotiating in June 1987.

=== Cuito Cuanavale and New York City ===
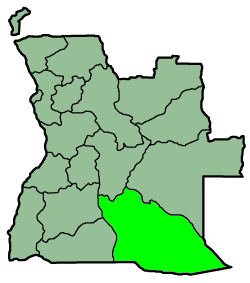
Cuando Cubango province

UNITA and South African forces attacked the MPLA's base at Cuito Cuanavale in Cuando Cubango province from January 13 to March 23, 1988, in the second largest battle in the history of Africa, after the Battle of El Alamein, the largest in sub-Saharan Africa since World War II. Cuito Cuanavale's importance came not from its size or its wealth but its location. Capturing the city would open the path for the Cubans and MPLA to UNITA's headquarters at Jamba. UNITA and South Africa retreated after a 15-hour battle on March 23.

The Cuban government joined negotiations on January 28, 1988, and all three parties held a round of negotiations on March 9. The South African government, joined negotiations on May 3 due to the military stalemate at Cuito Cuanavale and the parties met in June and August in New York City and Geneva. All parties agreed to a ceasefire on August 8. Representatives from the governments of Angola, Cuba, and South Africa signed the Tripartite Accord, granting independence to Namibia and ending the direct involvement of foreign troops in the civil war, in New York City, United States on December 22, 1988. The United Nations Security Council passed Resolution 626 later that day, creating the United Nations Angola Verification Mission, a UN peacekeeping force. UNAVEM troops began arriving in Angola in January 1989.

On August 23, 1989, Angolan President José Eduardo dos Santos complained that the U.S. and South African governments continued to fund UNITA, warning such activity endangered the already fragile ceasefire. The next day Savimbi announced UNITA would no longer abide by the ceasefire, citing Kaunda's insistence that Savimbi leave the country and UNITA disband. The government responded to Savimbi's statement by moving troops from Cuito Cuanavale, under government control, to UNITA-occupied Mavinga. The ceasefire broke down with dos Santos and the U.S. government blaming each other for the resumption in armed conflict.

=== Red Scorpion ===
Anti-communist activist Jack Abramoff wrote and co-produced the film Red Scorpion with his brother Robert in 1989. Dolph Lundgren played Nikolai, a Soviet agent sent to assassinate an African revolutionary in a country modeled on Angola. The film has a strongly anti-Communist message, and goes to great lengths to depict the Soviets as violent sadists, including a scene in which chemical weapons are used. The South African government financed the film through the International Freedom Foundation, a front-group chaired by Abramoff, as part of its efforts to undermine international sympathy for the African National Congress.

== 1990s ==
Political changes abroad and military victories at home allowed the government to transition from a nominally communist state to a nominally democratic one. Namibia's declaration of independence, internationally recognized on April 1, eliminated the southwestern front of combat as South African forces withdrew to the east.

Then, in a series of stunning victories, UNITA regained control over Caxito, Huambo, M'banza Kongo, Ndalatando, and Uíge, provincial capitals it had not held since 1976, and moved against Kuito, Luena, and Malange. Although the U.S. and South African governments had stopped aiding UNITA, supplies continued to come from Mobutu in Zaire. UNITA tried to wrest control of Cabinda from the MPLA in January 1993. Edward DeJarnette, Head of the U.S. Liaison Office in Angola for the Clinton Administration, warned Savimbi that, if UNITA hindered or halted Cabinda's production, the U.S. would end its support for UNITA. On January 9, UNITA began a 55-day-long battle over Huambo, the War of the Cities. Hundreds of thousands fled and 10,000 were killed before UNITA gained control on March 7. The government engaged in an ethnic cleansing of Bakongo, and, to a lesser extent Ovimbundu, in multiple cities, most notably Luanda, on January 22 in the Bloody Friday massacre. UNITA and government representatives met five days later in Ethiopia, but negotiations failed to restore the peace. The United Nations Security Council sanctioned UNITA through Resolution 864 on September 15, 1993, prohibiting the sale of weapons or fuel to UNITA. Perhaps the clearest shift in U.S. foreign policy emerged when President Clinton issued Executive Order 12865 on September 23, labeling UNITA a "continuing threat to the foreign policy objectives of the U.S.". By August 1993, UNITA had gained control over 70% of Angola, but the government's military successes in 1994 forced UNITA to sue for peace. By November 1994, the government had taken control of 60% of the country. Savimbi called the situation UNITA's "deepest crisis" since its creation.

Zimbabwean President Robert Mugabe and South African President Nelson Mandela met in Lusaka on November 15, 1994, to boost support symbolically for the Lusaka Protocol. Mugabe and Mandela both said they would be willing to meet with Savimbi and Mandela asked him to come to South Africa, but Savimbi did not come.

Savimbi met with South African President Nelson Mandela in May. Shortly after, on June 18, the MPLA offered Savimbi the position of Vice President under dos Santos with another Vice President chosen from the MPLA. Savimbi told Mandela he felt ready to "serve in any capacity which will aid my nation," but he did not accept the proposal until August 12.

By 1998, the UN had identified the role of conflict diamonds in the financing of UNITA's ongoing war, and passed a number of resolutions imposing sanctions with the object of targeting this illicit trade; United Nations Security Council Resolutions 1173, 1176, 1237 and 1295 followed.

== 2000s and beyond ==
In 2009, South African President Jacob Zuma led a delegation of 11 cabinet ministers to Angola. It was the new President's first official State Visit and was seen by experts as very important to the strengthening of relations between the two countries.

In 2016, trade between Angola and South Africa was worth US$1.83 billion. South African exports to Angola amounted to US$562.9 million and Angolan exports to South Africa amounted to US$1.27 billion.

== Resident diplomatic missions ==
- Angola has an embassy in Pretoria and consulates-general in Cape Town and Johannesburg.
- South Africa has an embassy in Luanda.

== See also ==
- Foreign relations of Angola
- Foreign relations of South Africa
