= United Nations Security Council Resolution 447 =

UN Security Council Resolution 447
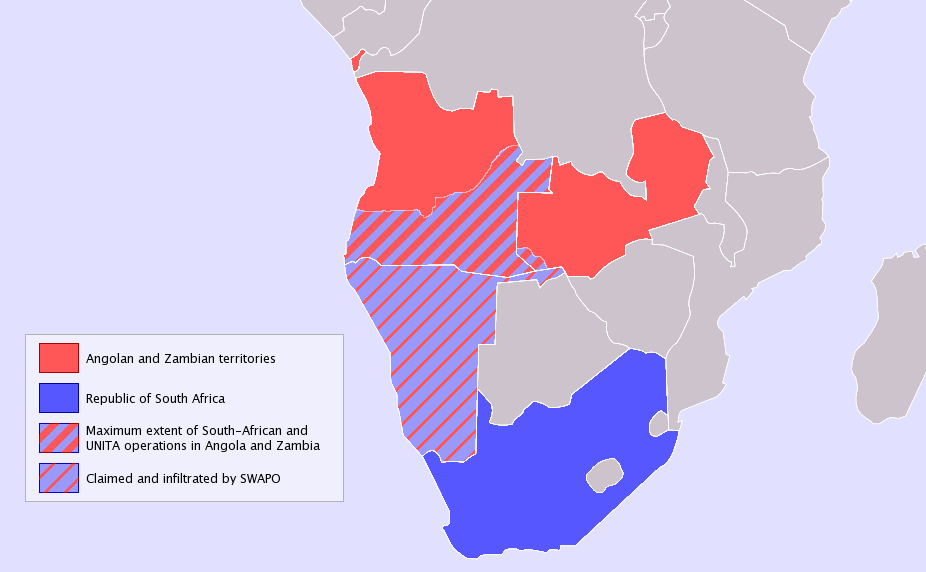
- South African border operations
- Date: 28 March 1979
- Meeting no.: 2,139
- Code: S/RES/447 (Document)
- Subject: Angola-South Africa
- Voting summary: 12 voted for; None voted against; 3 abstained
- Result: Adopted

Security Council composition
- Permanent members: China; France; Soviet Union; United Kingdom; United States
- Non-permanent members: Bangladesh; Bolivia; Czechoslovakia; Gabon; Jamaica; Kuwait; Nigeria; Norway; Portugal; Zambia

United Nations Security Council resolution 447, adopted on 28 March 1979, after hearing representations from the People's Republic of Angola and the South West Africa People's Organisation (SWAPO), the Council recalled resolutions 387 (1976) and 428 (1978) and condemned South Africa for its continuing raids in direct violation of prior resolutions.

Resolution 447 went on to condemn the suppression of the Namibian people by South Africa, apartheid and the militarisation of South West Africa (Namibia). The Council demanded South Africa respect the territorial integrity of these states, and commended Angola and other front-line states for their support of the Namibian people, asking other states to provide assistance to them.

The resolution ended with a request to the Secretary-General to submit a report by 30 April 1979 on the situation.

The Council adopted Resolution 447 by 12 votes to none; France, the United Kingdom and United States abstained.

== See also ==
- List of United Nations Security Council Resolutions 401 to 500 (1971–1976)
- Namibian War of Independence
- South African Border War
- Apartheid
