= United Nations Security Council Resolution 428 =

UN Security Council Resolution 428
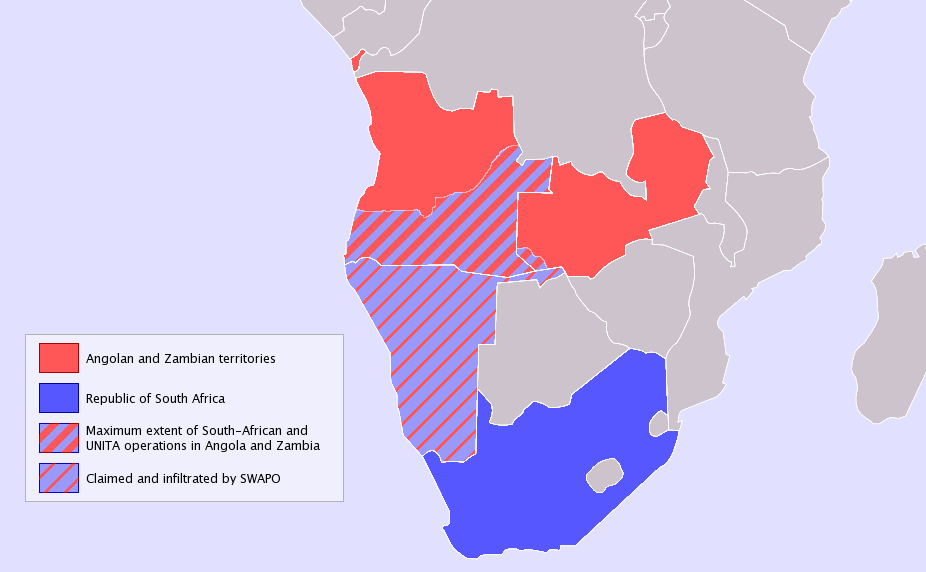
- South Africa border raids
- Date: 6 May 1978
- Meeting no.: 2,078
- Code: S/RES/428 (Document)
- Subject: Angola-South Africa
- Voting summary: 15 voted for; None voted against; None abstained
- Result: Adopted

Security Council composition
- Permanent members: China; France; Soviet Union; United Kingdom; United States
- Non-permanent members: Bolivia; Canada; Czechoslovakia; Gabon; India; Kuwait; Mauritius; Nigeria; Venezuela; West Germany

United Nations Security Council Resolution 428, adopted unanimously on May 6, 1978, after hearing representations from the People's Republic of Angola, Zambia and the South West Africa People's Organisation (SWAPO), the Council reminded Member States to refrain from using threats and use of force in their international relations. Reiterating Resolution 387 (1976), the present resolution condemned South Africa for its armed invasion of Angola via South West Africa (Namibia).

Resolution 428 went on to condemn the suppression of the Namibian people by South Africa, as well as apartheid. The Council reaffirmed that the liberation of the Namibian people would be a prerequisite for the attainment of peace and security in southern Africa. The resolution also commended the People's Republic of Angola for its support of the Namibian people.

Finally, the council made provisions that, should Angola be attacked again, it would not hesitate to adopt further measures against South Africa, in accordance with Chapter VII of the United Nations Charter.

== See also ==
- List of United Nations Security Council Resolutions 401 to 500 (1976–1982)
- Namibian War of Independence
- South African Border Wars
- South Africa under apartheid
- Cassinga Raid
