= United Nations Security Council Resolution 387 =

UN Security Council Resolution 387
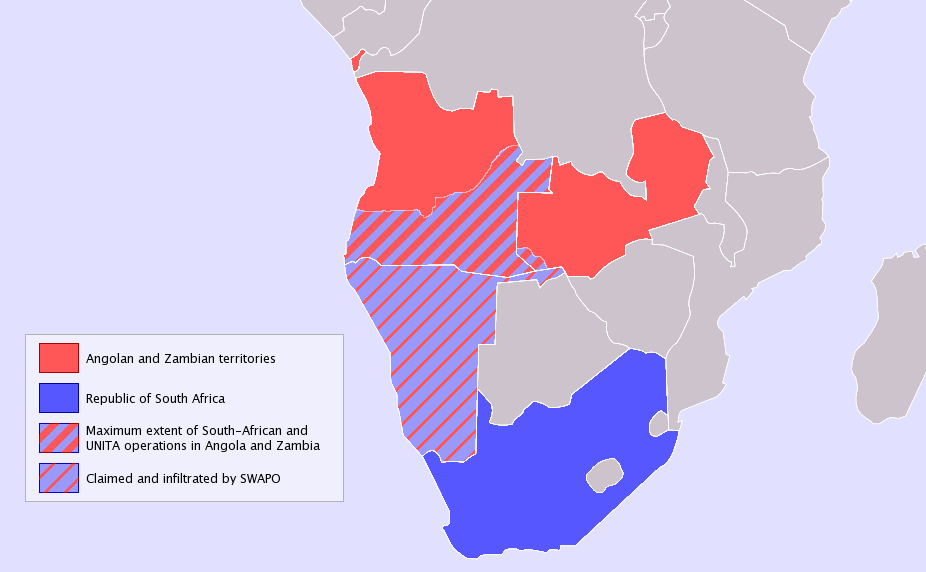
- Incursions into Angolan territory by South Africa
- Date: 31 March 1976
- Meeting no.: 1,906
- Code: S/RES/387 (Document)
- Subject: Angola-South Africa
- Voting summary: 9 voted for; None voted against; 5 abstained
- Result: Adopted

Security Council composition
- Permanent members: China; France; Soviet Union; United Kingdom; United States
- Non-permanent members: Benin; Guyana; Italy; Japan; Libya; Pakistan; Panama; Romania; Sweden; Tanzania

United Nations Security Council Resolution 387, adopted on March 31, 1976, reaffirmed the principle of a state's right to territorial integrity in the face of South African incursions into Angolan territory. The Council recognized the international disturbance at South Africa's actions and expressed its concern over them. The Resolution condemned South Africa's actions and demanded that it respect the territorial integrity of Angola. The Council further demanded that South Africa desist from using the "international Territory of Namibia" to mount provocative or aggressive acts against other states and called upon the South African government to meet Angola's just claims for compensation.

The resolution was adopted with nine votes to none; France, Italy, Japan, the United Kingdom and United States abstained from voting, while the People's Republic of China did not participate in voting.

== See also ==
- Angola – South Africa relations
- List of United Nations Security Council Resolutions 301 to 400 (1971–1976)
- Operation Savannah
- South African Border War
- South West Africa
