= The Wrysons =

- Short story by John Cheever
- Country: United States
- Language: English

Publication
- Published in: The New Yorker
- Publication date: September 15, 1958

"The Wrysons" is a short story by John Cheever published by The New Yorker on September 15, 1958. The work was included in the collection volume Some People, Places, and Things That Will Not Appear in My Next Novel (1961) published by Harper and Brothers. The story also appears in The Stories of John Cheever (1978).

== Plot ==
Donald and Irene Wryson are a married couple living in the upper-middle class suburb of Shady Hill. They have one child, a girl named Dolly.

The couple have no literary or artistic interests, and pursue gardening more for appearance than pleasure. They devote most of their time and energy petitioning for zoning laws to maintain the social and ethnic exclusivity of their largely WASP community. Though they rarely socialize, the couple avidly prepare and send hundreds of Christmas cards to local acquaintances.

Both Donald and Irene each have a secret eccentricity:

Irene Wryson suffers from excruciating nightmares about a dystopian world in the aftermath of a nuclear holocaust. She does not tell Donald about these recurring dreams, which include explicit scenes of carnage and death. Set in Shady Hill, one of the dreams concerns a phantasmagoric mercy killing, in which Irene attempts to administer poison to Dolly as radioactive fallout descends on their house. Donald's oddness manifests itself in his baking of cakes and cookies, a skill he learned as a boy from his mother, a grass widow. He finds that the activity provides a brief antidote to his depression. These furtive nighttime activities go undetected by Irene.

One night, Irene awakes from her night terrors and detects a sweet, burning odor. Disoriented by her dream, she is convinced she smells the smoke plume from an atomic bomb. She goes downstairs and discovers Donald asleep at the kitchen table, smoke pouring from the oven. He has neglected to remove his Lady Baltimore cake before it was burnt. Irene tells Donald she thought it was a hydrogen bomb that had exploded. He informs her it is merely a cake.

Their secrets exposed, neither of them have an epiphany concerning the other's suffering. The Wrysons suppress these discoveries in the interest of preserving the normalcy of their suburban existence.

== Style and theme ==
Literary critic Lynne Waldeland writes:

Though it doesn't have the most serious subject or the most far-reaching theme of the stories in Some People, Places, and Things That Will Not Appear in My Next Novel, "The Wrysons" is one of best written...it is more like the stories in The Housebreaker of Shady Hill and Other Stories wherein the crises are not, for the most part, tragic.

Waldeland observes that the story "ends quickly and effectively with the couple exactly the same as they were at the beginning."

Literary critic Samuel Coales comments on the characters as social types:

The oddities the couple have just discovered about each other must quickly be suppressed to keep their suburban vision of order and "normalcy" intact. They want to preserve and protect the conventional manners and rituals of Shady Hill at all costs. Their glimpse of disorder and irrationality has frightened them.

Donald and Irene Wrysons "suburban fear of change" is conveyed by Cheever's stylistic handling of the story. A tone of mockery is evident, but the "calm and graceful prose" balances this impression. The graphic descriptions of violence and despair in Irene's dreams "seems to be sacrificed to the beautiful calm that the style itself creates."

Coale offers this caveat:

It almost seems as though to Cheever the horrible reality of the [atomic] bomb is no more frightening than the benignly eccentric habit of baking a cake in the middle of the night. We are left wondering whether or not the questions raised in the story and the anxieties revealed have not been too gracefully shaped and too easily passed over by the very style that has created them.

Writer and editor Tim Lieder calls it the quintessential story about 1950s fears (nuclear war and actual emotions) and is very impressed with the way that Cheever dangles a melodramatic ending in front of the reader before choosing a sad ending about how these two will never reveal their fears to each other. Lieder also notes that the same Cold War paranoia that drove The Twilight Zone is obvious in this story.

== Sources ==
- Bailey, Blake. 2009. Notes on Text in John Cheever: Collected Stories and Other Writing. The Library of America. Pp. 1025-1028 ISBN 978-1-59853-034-6
- Coale, Samuel. 1977. John Cheever. Frederick Ungar Publishing Company, New York. ISBN 0-8044-6081-7
- O'Hara, James E. 1989. John Cheever: A Study of the Short Fiction. Twayne Publishers, Boston Massachusetts. Twayne Studies in Short Fiction no 9. ISBN 0-8057-8310-5
- Waldeland, Lynne. 1979. John Cheever. Twayne Publishers, G. K. Hall & Company, Boston, Massachusetts. ISBN 0-8057-7251-0
