= Oh What a Paradise It Seems =

Novella by John Cheever

Oh What A Paradise It Seems
- Author: John Cheever
- Language: English
- Publisher: Alfred A. Knopf
- Publication date: 1982
- Publication place: United States
- Media type: Print
- Pages: 100
- ISBN: 0394513347
- Preceded by: The Stories of John Cheever

Oh What a Paradise It Seems is a 1982 novella by John Cheever. It is Cheever's last work of fiction, published shortly before his death from cancer.

The main character is Lemuel Sears, an elderly computer-industry executive, twice-widowed, who pursues an ardent but unsuccessful love affair with Renee, a beautiful but elusive woman who works in real-estate. There are numerous subplots. Sears becomes involved in another love affair, and is also funding an investigation of the pollution of Beasley's Pond in Connecticut, where he enjoys ice skating. The novella reprises many of Cheever's familiar themes, including love, lust, life in suburbia, and a sense of displacement.

== Reception ==
Writing in the New York Times, John Leonard called the novella "perfect Cheever; it is perfect, period." In The Boston Phoenix, Rhoda Koenig said that "In Paradise, [Cheever] puts the emphasis on the right place: the profound sadness of trying to return to the springs of life and being reminded of the futility of trying to stop death and time. This is a slight book, and at times it tries too hard to wring tears, but it also conveys the poignance of that quest, the enchantment of music heard over the water."

John Updike, a friend of Cheever, preferred it to Cheever's novel Falconer, and remarked on the theme of ice skating, which he called his "Wordsworthian hike" and his "connection with elemental purity and the awesome depths above and below".
