= The Geometry of Love =

- Short story by John Cheever
- Country: United States
- Language: English

Publication
- Published in: The Saturday Evening Post
- Publication date: January 1, 1966

"The Geometry of Love" is a work of short fiction by John Cheever which first appeared in The Saturday Evening Post on January 1, 1966. The story was collected in The World of Apples, published in 1973 by Alfred A. Knopf.

== Plot ==
Charlie Mallory, an engineer, lives in New York City with his wife Matilda, a homemaker, and their two young children. Cheever refers to his protagonist as Mallory throughout the story. The Mallorys are emotionally estranged, and Matilda punishes her uxorious husband with accusatory invective that leave him dismayed and disheartened.

When a delivery truck passes him bearing the name EUCLID'S DRY CLEANING AND DYEING on its side panel, Mallory has an epiphany: he decides to formulate an escape from his troubled life by way of Euclidean geometry. As an engineer, he possesses superior skills at drawing these mathematical diagrams. He proceeds to represent his existence in terms of theorems and postulates, allowing him to assert a measure of control over the chaos of his daily affairs. Mallory's methods, in particular, permit him to endure Matilda's mood swings with equanimity. Immensely satisfied with his results, Mallory considers writing a treatise on his system and considers calling it Euclidean Emotion: The Geometry of Sentiment.

Mallory's proficiency at reducing the troubling complexities of his emotional and physical surroundings to linear representations soon rebounds on him. On a business trip to Chicago, he attempts to deflect the depressing landscape of Gary, Indiana by configuring it into a parallelogram. By a geometric miscalculation, he causes the city to vanish entirely from his sight.

A few weeks later, Mallory collapses in his office. He is rushed to the hospital where a portion of his intestines are removed. Matilda visits her gravely ill husband, gushing with false cheeriness. She considers his convalescence in the posh hospital an act of self-indulgence. Mallory is devastated by Matilda's detachment from his suffering and doubts that he can survive another such encounter.

Obtaining his slide rule and notebook from the nurse he devises "a simple, geometric analogy between his love for Matilda and his fear of death." The formula is a success and shields Mallory from Matilda's suffocating insinuations during her next visit. When she departs, he attempts to shave his face. His cadaverous visage in the mirror spurs him to enlist geometry to counter his death-like appearance. Proceeding with caution— wary of his miscalculation at the city of Gary— Mallory conjures his fateful diagram.

That evening, after Matilda returns home, she is informed by her housekeeper that Mallory is dead.

== Publication background ==
Cheever wrote "The Geometry of Love" in September 1965, over a year after completing his last short story "The Swimmer", the latter considered one his finest works of short fiction.

The New Yorker's leading editor William Maxwell, who had for years championed Cheever's literary output, declined to accept "The Geometry of Love" for publication. Biographer Scott Donaldson reports that "Maxwell suggested, gently, that the story had failed. The trouble, he thought, was liquor [i.e. Cheever's alcoholism]. The stories were still beautifully written, but they had no point…"

Cheever offered the story to The Saturday Evening Post, where it was instantly acquired for $3000. The rejection at The New Yorker produced both a feeling of vindication, as well as a measure of self-doubt in Cheever.

== Theme ==
The reduction of complex and troubling social interactions into geometric configurations provide a measure of solace to Charlie Mallory. Cheever enumerates these in the following passage:

As Mallory continued with his study and his practice, he discovered that the rudeness of headwaiters, the damp souls of clerks, and the scurrilities of traffic policemen could not touch his tranquility, and that these oppressors, in turn, sensing his strength, were less rude, damp and scurrilous…

Literary critic Lynne Waldeland suggests a more sinister element arises when this Euclidean "magic" is summoned:

The story is primarily an entertainment, a fabulous account of the danger of applying scientific principles too effectively to the human world. At first the story seems humorous and Mallory a mild eccentric; only gradually do we realize that the power of geometry is taking over, much as radios and piano exercises did in other Cheever stories of this kind" namely "The Enormous Radio" and "The Music Teacher", respectively.

Biographer Scott Donaldson registers some skepticism as to the thematic and structural legitimacy in "The Geometry of Love.":

On a literal level the story does not represent a convincing picture of reality. The basic idea - that Euclidean geometry can ameliorate a bad marriage - is preposterous, and whether intentionally or not, the episodes are strung together with a conspicuous lack of coherence.

== Sources ==
- Bailey, Blake. 2008. Notes on Text in John Cheever: Collected Stories and Other Writing. The Library of America. Pp.1025-1028 ISBN 978-1-59853-034-6
- Donaldson, Scott. 1988. John Cheever: A Biography. Random House, New York. ISBN 0-394-54921-X
- Meanor, Patrick. 1995. John Cheever Revisited. Twayne Publishers, New York. ISBN 0-8057-3999-8
- Waldeland, Lynne. 1979. John Cheever. Twayne Publishers, G. K. Hall & Company, Boston, Massachusetts. ISBN 0-8057-7251-0
