= Goodbye, My Brother =

1951 short story by John Cheever

- Short story by John Cheever
- Country: United States
- Language: English

Publication
- Published in: The New Yorker
- Publication date: August 25, 1951

"Goodbye, My Brother" is a short story by John Cheever, first published in The New Yorker (August 25, 1951), and collected in The Enormous Radio and Other Stories (1953). The work also appears in The Stories of John Cheever (1978).

== Plot ==
"Goodbye, My Brother" records the apparently final reunion of the upper-middle-class Pommeroy family at their collectively owned Massachusetts seaside property.

Three brothers, a sister, and their widowed mother are gathered at the summer residence, and though they meet infrequently they retain affectionate bonds with each other. The third and youngest of the brothers, Lawrence, is an acerbic lawyer who has little in common with his siblings and who harshly judges the moral shortcomings of each member of the family.

The story emerges as a struggle between the puritanical outlook held by Lawrence and the more tolerant and life-affirming values of his mother and siblings.

== Publication history ==
Originally published by The New Yorker on August 25, 1951, Cheever was emphatic that "Goodbye, My Brother" appear as the leading story in the 1978 collection of his work The Stories of John Cheever, though he acknowledged it violated the chronological framework of the volume.

== Critical assessment ==
Widely regarded as one of Cheever's short fiction "masterpieces" the story is among his most anthologized work.

Literary critic Lynne Waldeland observes that "Cheever is seldom listed among the major innovators in fiction in the twentieth century and seems at first glance to be quite traditional in form," but adds that "Goodbye, My Brother" represents a significant advance in the development of Cheever's writing, in which "genre-expanding experimentation takes place."

== Theme ==
The subject of family relationships, and more specifically the conflicts between two male siblings, is the single most common theme in Cheever's novels, and appears in many of his short stories. "Goodbye, My Brother" is perhaps the most notable of these.

The story is an examination of the irreconcilable conflict between the "bleak, dogmatic severity" of the Pommeroy's youngest son, Lawrence, and the enlightened humanism exhibited by the rest of the family, especially its women.

More than one critic has discerned a fratricidal Cain and Abel-like struggle in the story, though here the roles are inverted, in which "the 'bad' brother is actually the victim of violence."

"In story after story and novel after novel, Cheever repostulated in modern terms a romantic version of Nathaniel Hawthorne's conflicts with the Puritans' fear of the body and their insistent demonization of the powers of nature... 'Goodbye, My Brother' becomes the first of many of Cheever's early stories that deal with the necessity of exorcising an Edenic place, situation or mental state of a corrupting influence."—Literary critic Patrick Meanor in John Cheever Revisited (1995)

The final paragraph of "Goodbye, My Brother" is frequently quoted at length in critical analyses of the work. The passage announces the triumph of "preternatural innocence" over the forces of misanthropy.

The sea that morning was iridescent and dark. My wife and my sister were swimming—Diana and Helen—and I saw their uncovered heads, black and gold in the dark water. I saw them come out and I saw that they were naked, unshy, beautiful, and full of grace, and I watched the naked women walk out of the sea.

Critic Samuel Coale reports that Cheever frequently employed classical and biblical imagery in his writing: "The image of Venus rising from the sea broadens and strengthens the narrator's lyric vision as contrasted to Lawrence's image as a Puritan cleric."

Literary critic Patrick Meanor notes the mythological references in the passage, notably, the goddesses Diana and Helen of Troy: "The Dionysians and their celebration of the physical body are Cheever's response to the dark denial and shame of the Puritan ethos that his story clearly condemns."

Critic Lynne Waldeland identifies the youngest son, Lawrence, as a "Hawthornesque" figure, who condemns what he perceives as his family's indulgence in earthly pleasures. They ultimately prevail over Lawrence, who severs his ties with them: "The mythical overtones of goddesses appearing out of the sea...underline the story's point that traditions needn't be constricting but can be life-enhancing."

== Sources ==
- Bailey, Blake. 2009 (1). Notes on Text in John Cheever: Collected Stories and Other Writing. The Library of America. Pp.1025-1028 ISBN 978-1-59853-034-6
- Bailey, Blake. 2009 (2). Cheever: A Life. Alfred A. Knopf, New York. 770 pp. ISBN 978-1-4000-4394-1
- Coale, Samuel. 1977. John Cheever. Frederick Ungar Publishing Company, New York. ISBN 0-8044-6081-7
- Donaldson, Scott. 1988. John Cheever: A Biography. Random House, New York. ISBN 0-394-54921-X
- Meanor, Patrick. 1995. John Cheever Revisited. Twayne Publishers, New York. ISBN 0-8057-3999-8
- O'Hara, James E. 1989. John Cheever: A Study of the Short Fiction. Twayne Publishers, Boston Massachusetts. Twayne Studies in Short Fiction no 9. ISBN 0-8057-8310-5
- Waldeland, Lynne. 1979. John Cheever. Twayne Publishers, G. K. Hall & Company, Boston, Massachusetts. ISBN 0-8057-7251-0
