= The Brigadier and the Golf Widow =

Short story collection by John Cheever

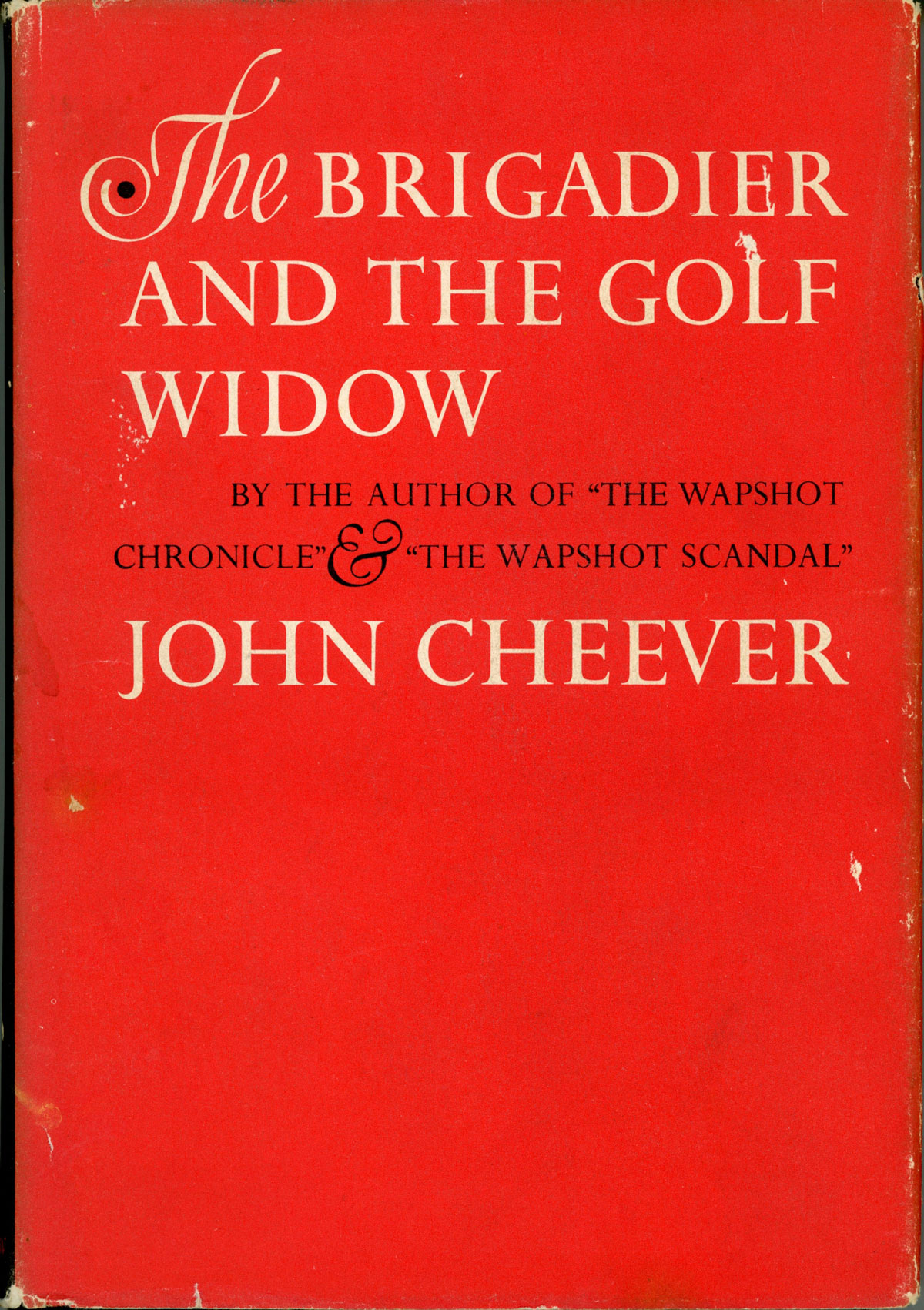
- First edition cover
- Author: John Cheever
- Language: English
- Publisher: Harper & Row
- Publication date: 1964
- Publication place: United States
- Media type: Print (hardcover)
- Pages: 275
- OCLC: 282383
- Dewey Decimal: 813/.52
- LC Class: PZ3.C3983 Br

The Brigadier and the Golf Widow is a collection of short fiction by John Cheever, published by Harper and Row in 1964. These sixteen works were first published individually in The New Yorker. The works also appears in The Stories of John Cheever (1978).

Several stories in this volume are among the most frequently anthologized of Cheever's work, notably "The Swimmer", "The Angel of the Bridge", "Clementina", and "The Music Teacher."

== Stories ==
The date of publication in The New Yorker appears in parentheses.

- "The Chaste Clarissa" (June 14, 1952)
- "Just One More Time" (October 8, 1955)
- "The Bella Lingua" (March 1, 1958)
- "The Music Teacher" (November 21, 1959)
- "A Woman Without a Country" (December 12, 1959)
- "Clementina" (May 7, 1960)
- "The Seaside Houses" (July 29, 1961)
- "The Angel of the Bridge" (October 21, 1961)
- "The Brigadier and the Golf Widow" (November 11, 1961)
- "A Vision of the World" (September 29, 1962)
- "Reunion" (October 27, 1962)
- "Metamorphoses" (March 2, 1963)
- "An Educated American Woman" (November 2, 1963)
- "The Ocean" (August 1, 1964)
- "Marito in Città" (July 4, 1964)
- "The Swimmer" (July 18, 1964)

== Reception ==
Biographer Blake Bailey notes that a number of critics registered "a vaguely troubled note about the direction of Cheever's work." Orville Prescott in the daily New York Times considered some of the stories "sinister fantasies", among these "The Swimmer" and "The Ocean." Critic John W. Aldridge attacked Cheever's "nightmare tonalities", comparing the stories to "macabre" creations of cartoonist Charles Addams.

The critical response to The Brigadier and the Golf Widow was largely positive and marks a period during which Cheever "began to attain his first genuine fame and wealth."

The Brigadier and the Golf Widow is one of Cheever's most sophisticated satires on suburban life, especially its Edenic satisfactions. But in its obsessions with the bomb scares, it could be more accurately called an eschatological parable; that is, the entire focus of the story, its tone and theme, deals with the end of the world, the last judgment, and heaven and hell."—Literary critic Patrick Meanor in John Cheever Revisited (1995).

In a Time magazine review by Alwyn Lee, Cheever was approvingly dubbed the "Ovid in Ossining." The title, according to biographer Patrick Meanor, "encapsulates Cheever's major attitude toward his subject matter and identifies his use of myth as the major structuring principle of his fiction. His specific use of Ovidian themes of transformation and metamorphosis becomes increasingly obvious from The Brigadier and the Golf Widow, until the end of his career, particularly in two of his most anthologized stories, "The Swimmer" and "The Music Teacher"."

Critic Lynn Waldeland reports that the collection contains "the greatest number of frequently anthologized stories, including "The Swimmer", "The Angel of the Bridge", "Clementina", and "The Music Teacher"." Critic William Pelen "declared The Brigadier and the Golf Widow Cheever's best volume of short stories."

== Sources ==
- Bailey, Blake. 2009 (1). Notes on Text in John Cheever: Collected Stories and Other Writing. The Library of America. Pp. 1025-1028 ISBN 978-1-59853-034-6
- Bailey, Blake. 2009 (2). Cheever: A Life. Alfred A. Knopf, New York. 770 pp. ISBN 978-1-4000-4394-1
- O'Hara, James E. 1989. John Cheever: A Study of the Short Fiction. Twayne Publishers, Boston Massachusetts. Twayne Studies in Short Fiction no 9. ISBN 0-8057-8310-5
- Meanor, Patrick. 1995. John Cheever Revisited. Twayne Publishers, New York. ISBN 0-8057-3999-8
- Waldeland, Lynne. 1979. John Cheever. Twayne Publishers, G. K. Hall & Company, Boston, Massachusetts. ISBN 0-8057-7251-0
