= The Day the Pig Fell Into the Well =

"The Day the Pig Fell Into the Well" may refer to:

- The Day the Pig Fell Into the Well, a 1954 short story by John Cheever
- The Day a Pig Fell into the Well (Daijiga Umule Pajinnal), a 1996 Korean film
