= Leandro Arellano =

Mexican diplomat and author

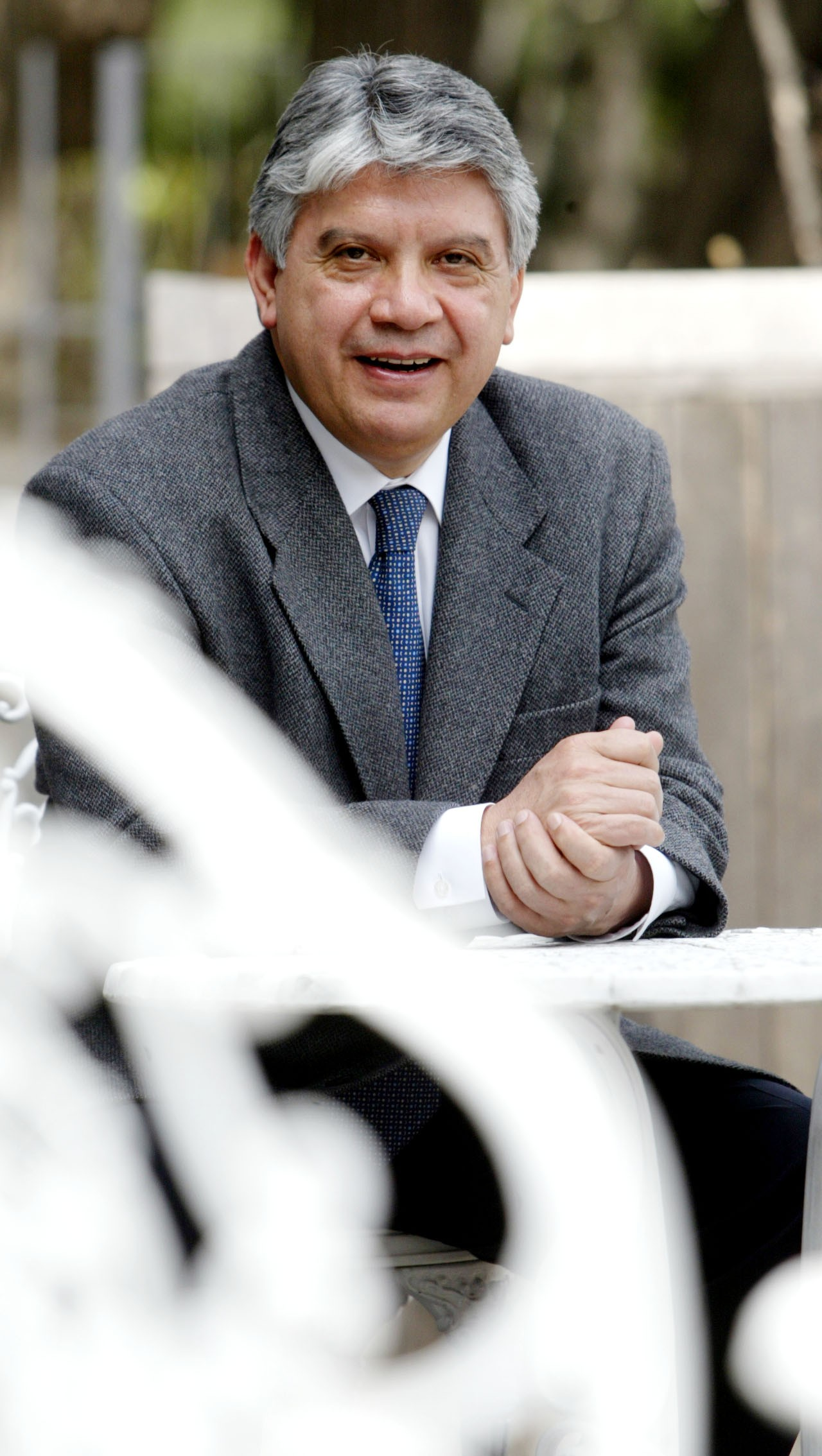
Leandro Arellano, Mexican writer and diplomat.

Leandro Arellano is a Mexican diplomat and author, who was born in Guanajuato, Mexico in 1952.

Leandro has written the book of stories Private War (Editorial Verbum, Madrid, 2007), and The Steps of Heaven (Ediciones del Ermitaño, Mexico, 2008), which bring together short essays, notes and articles on cities, travel, writers, and other personalities of history and literature. Oriental landscape (Editorial Delgado, El Salvador, 2012) contains reflections and experiences of the author on East Asia. In his most recent book, Las horas (Monte Ávila Editores, Caracas, 2015), he brings together short essays, articles, vignettes, notes and studies on various topics.

Some of his stories have also been translated into Romanian and Korean.

He has translated stories by Raymond Carver, John Cheever, W. Somerset Maugham, and Guy de Mauppassant.

He regularly contributes to the cultural supplement La Jornada Semanal and other publications. As a member of the Diplomatic Service of his country, he has resided in Vienna, London, New York City, Nairobi, Bucharest, Seoul, and San Salvador. He is currently the ambassador of Mexico to Venezuela.

== Works ==
- Private War, Editorial Verbum, Madrid, 2007
- The steps of the sky, Ediciones del Ermitaño, Mexico, 2008
- Oriental landscape, Editorial Delgado, El Salvador, 2012
- The hours located, Monte Avia Editores, Venezuela, 2015

== Awards and Distinctions ==
- Medal of the National Order of Jose Matias Delgado in Grade of Grand Cross Silver Plaqu, Republic of El Salvador.
- Decoration of the Order of Merit of the Diplomatic Service, degree of Banda, Republic of Korea
