= O Youth and Beauty! =

- Short story by John Cheever
- Country: United States
- Language: English

Publication
- Published in: The New Yorker
- Publication date: August 22, 1953

"O Youth and Beauty!" is a short story by John Cheever first published in The New Yorker on August 22, 1953. The work was included the collection of Cheever's short fiction The Housebreaker of Shady Hill and Other Stories (1958) by Harper and Brothers. The story is also included in The Stories of John Cheever (1978).

"O Youth and Beauty" is first of a series stories that Cheever set in the fictional town of Shady Hill, dealing with the New England suburban middle-class Often anthologized, the story concerns the physical and moral decline of a former male athlete, and his failure to cope with the onset of old age.

== Plot ==
Cash Bentley is a 40-year-old businessman who resides with his wife Louise and two young children in Shady Hill, a New England suburb. Louise is preoccupied with her duties as a homemaker, which she manages with the couples' modest financial resources. The social lives of Cash and Louise are limited to the endless local gatherings that occur at the homes of their neighbors. These get-togethers are fueled largely by alcohol.

Cash, a college track star in his youth, performs a ritual demonstration at these social events to prove his athletic prowess: whenever he is teased for his evident aging, he arranges the living room furniture into a mock hurdle course, then dashes over them at great speed to astonishment and delight of his guests.

Cash's physical and mental state undergo a sudden and precipitous decline after he breaks a leg during one of these drunken performances. His relationship with Louise, already strained, is further tested. Cash is entirely unequipped to face the loss of his youthful good looks and vitality. His awareness that most of the young men and woman in the Shady Hill community enjoy unbounded health and optimism tortures him.

In a final attempt to reclaim the past glories of his youth, he arranges the furniture in his own home, and prepares to run the course. He hands Louise a pistol, and instructs her to fire a round to launch the event. She struggles with the gun's safety catch and the weapon discharges. Cash is shot and killed instantly as he leaps over a sofa.

== Theme ==
The opening framing sentence of the work—"one of the longest Cheever ever wrote"—is a litany of empty amusements that occupy the suburban residents of Shady Hill. This is the social milieu in which Cash declines morally and physically, and which can offer no alternative to his pathetic search for his lost youth. Literary critic Patrick Meanor remarks on the closing scene in the story:

...Cash is determined to accomplish two tasks: to test the illusion once more that he is still the youthful track star and, concurrently and unconsciously, to kill himself because his spiritual poverty offers him no other alternative.

Meanor adds: "Cash Bentley never loses his lethal innocence because he never grows up and becomes an adult. Indeed, the imperative to grow up and become consciously aware that he no longer a boy is precisely what kills him."

Cheever describes Cash's utter failure to transition to physical and emotional maturity. The social structure of the suburban Shady Hill provides Cash no means to reckon with his deterioration. Literary critic Samuel Coale writes:

The broader view of the human condition transcends the detailed reproduction of the suburban social scene that long fascinated Cheever in his earlier tales...In "O Youth and Beauty!" man's spiritual and aesthetic needs are revealed as being as important as his social needs....

Literary critic Lynne Waldeland questions if Cash's final performance was suicidal: "The story ends with an ambiguous act; yet one cannot help but feel that, given the limitations of his outlook on life, Cash probably is better off dead." Biographer James E. O'Hara also notes that the story ends on an "equivocal note" with respect to the Louise's agency in the death of her spouse. O'Hara points to a scene that sheds light on this question: Louise, after witnessing Cash collapse after an impromptu hurdling exhibition at the country club, tenderly cradles his head in her arms - long dash"strikingly reminiscent of Michelangelo's Pietà" O'Hara writes:

Both Cash and Louise understood full well that Cash was born to be an eternal twenty-one-year-old. Time had mercilessly outstripped that self-image, to the point that when Cash hands his wife the pistol, he was making a wordless compact with Death (emphatically not with Louise, although she is Death's instrument), here seen as a deliverer. In effect Cash was already dead, as he lay, quite literally spent, as he lay in Louise's comforting arms at the country club."

Writer Tim Lieder notes that Cash's "glory days" were during the Great Depression accompanied by the rise of Communism and Fascism. So Cash is not only a callow youth in the body of a 40-year-old man but he is also privileged to have avoided most of the horrible things of the past 20 years including World War II. Lieder also notes that a 40-year-old man who is too old to run an obstacle course is a strange thing for a modern reader, but notes just how much alcohol, smoking and poor health decisions were common in the era.

== Sources ==
- Bailey, Blake. 2009 (1). Notes on Text in John Cheever: Collected Stories and Other Writing. The Library of America. Pp.1025-1028 ISBN 978-1-59853-034-6
- Bailey, Blake. 2009 (2). Cheever: A Life. Alfred A. Knopf, New York. 770 pp. ISBN 978-1-4000-4394-1
- Coale, Samuel. 1977. John Cheever. Frederick Ungar Publishing Company, New York. ISBN 0-8044-6081-7
- Meanor, Patrick. 1995. John Cheever Revisited. Twayne Publishers, New York. ISBN 0-8057-3999-8
- O'Hara, James E. 1989. John Cheever: A Study of the Short Fiction. Twayne Publishers, Boston Massachusetts. Twayne Studies in Short Fiction no 9. ISBN 0-8057-8310-5*Waldeland, Lynne. 1979. John Cheever. Twayne Publishers, G. K. Hall & Company, Boston, Massachusetts. ISBN 0-8057-7251-0
