= Torch Song (short story) =

- Short story by John Cheever
- Country: United States
- Language: English

Publication
- Published in: The New Yorker
- Publication date: October 4, 1947

"Torch Song" is a short story by John Cheever which first appeared in The New Yorker on October 4, 1947. The work was included in the short fiction collection The Enormous Radio and Other Stories (1953), published by Funk and Wagnalls. "Torch Song" is included in The Stories of John Cheever (1978).

A work often anthologized, the story is a modern rendering of the mythological Angel of Death.

== Plot ==
Jack Lorey is a twenty-something transplant to New York City, formerly of Ohio, who is seeking a career in New York City. He encounters Joan Harris, who hails from the same Ohio town as Jack, at a social gathering. She has abandoned her hopes of becoming a professional model, and serves at a number of entry-level jobs to support herself. Joan's demeanor is that of a healthy, well-adjusted and tolerant woman who enjoys social life. Jack and Joan form a casual platonic relationship, each pursuing their own romantic interests.

During the ensuing years Jack is twice married and divorced, yet his life continues to intersect with that of Joan, who retains her preternatural good looks and vitality. Jack notes that her paramours are generally men in their maturity, all of whom are physically impressive, but typically alcoholics down on their luck. Some are European émigrés, one who poses as an impoverished member of nobility. Joan, who exhibits boundless good cheer and stoic patience toward these men—some of whom cruelly abuse her—remains their faithful patroness. Her good health contrasts sharply with the gradual moral or physical deterioration of her lovers.

When Jack returns from serving in the military in World War II, he suffers financial setbacks and falls ill for months. Joan appears at his sickbed and offers to nurture him back to health. Jack has a shocking epiphany: all of Joan's male lovers have never recovered from their illnesses and bad fortune. It dawns on him that Joan is a benevolent Angel of Death, who has arrived only to preside over his passing. Despite Jack's panicked expulsion of Joan from his room, she serenely insists on returning that evening. Jack prepares to flee from the premises, his ultimate fate unknown.

== Critical assessment ==
James E. O'Hara regards "Torch Song" as one in a "breakthrough trilogy" that marked a distinct advance in the depth and complexity of Cheever's storytelling (The other two stories are "The Enormous Radio and Other Stories" and "Roseheath", also published in The New Yorker in 1947).

== Theme ==
Literary critic Lynne Waldeland notes that Cheever's "ominous introduction" in "Torch Song" anticipates its disturbing climax.:

After Jack Lorey had known Joan Harris in New York a few years, he began to think of her as The Widow. She always wore black, and he was always given the feeling, by a curious disorder in her apartment, the undertakers had just left. The impression did not stem from malice on his part, for he was fond of Joan...

Biographer Patrick Meanor identifies Joan Harris with the mythological figure Hecate of Greek antiquity, "known as one of the most notorious witches or sorcereesses of the ancient world." She escorts her victims by torchlight to the Underworld. Meanor writes:

Few of Cheever's characters are as outwardly normal as Joan Harris of "Torch Song", but no other Cheever figure takes on so ominously or subtly the obvious vampiric characteristics of the fatal woman as she...from 1947 on, there is a deeper and richer texturing taking place in his stories because was permitting archetypal figures - like Joan Harris - to enter his fiction.

Meanor adds this caveat: "There is no question that her character has a vampiric quality, but what makes her the frightening figure she becomes as the story unfolds is that she seems totally unaware of her mythical identity or her necromantic powers."

Literary critic James E. O'Hara cautions that Cheever's narrative is vulnerable to "misunderstandings" that may expose the author to accusations of misogyny. O'Hara writes:

Nowhere does Cheever state or suggest that Joan consciously seeks out men to destroy. She takes them as she finds them, and if anything, it is her passivity that seems to draw out the worst in them. In fact, by the time he glides into a deeper connection with her, Jack has made a thorough mess of his life, and Joan has had nothing to do with that. She is not a diabolical sorceress..."

O'Hara further argues that Cheever "removed the idea of deliberate evil from his portrayal of Joan for a thematic reason. He chose not to oversimplify her in order to drive home the point that evil does not depend on human volition for its existence..."Torch Song" disturbs us precisely because it does not simplify the moral universe."

Writer and critic Tim Lieder notes the fact that Mad Men most likely named Joan Harris after the title character and notes that her angel of death persona is from the perspective of a self-destructive man who turns to mysticism in order to make sense of his wrecked life.

== Sources ==
- Bailey, Blake. 2009 (1). Notes on Text in John Cheever: Collected Stories and Other Writing. The Library of America. Pp. 1025-1028 ISBN 978-1-59853-034-6
- Bailey, Blake. 2009 (2). Cheever: A Life. Alfred A. Knopf, New York. 770 pp. ISBN 978-1-4000-4394-1
- Coale, Samuel. 1977. John Cheever. Frederick Ungar Publishing Company, New York. ISBN 0-8044-6081-7
- Donaldson, Scott. 1988. John Cheever: A Biography. Random House, New York. ISBN 0-394-54921-X
- Meanor, Patrick. 1995. John Cheever Revisited. Twayne Publishers, New York. ISBN 0-8057-3999-8
- O'Hara, James E. 1989. John Cheever: A Study of the Short Fiction. Twayne Publishers, Boston Massachusetts. Twayne Studies in Short Fiction no 9. ISBN 0-8057-8310-5
- Waldeland, Lynne. 1979. John Cheever. Twayne Publishers, G. K. Hall & Company, Boston, Massachusetts. ISBN 0-8057-7251-0
