= The Five-Forty-Eight =

- Short story by John Cheever
- Country: United States
- Language: English
- Genre: short story

Publication
- Publisher: The New Yorker
- Media type: Print (Magazine)
- Publication date: April 10, 1954

"The Five-Forty-Eight" is a short story written by John Cheever that was originally published in the April 10, 1954, issue of The New Yorker and later collected in The Housebreaker of Shady Hill and Other Stories (1958) and The Stories of John Cheever (1978).

In 1955 "The Five-Forty-Eight" was awarded the Benjamin Franklin Magazine Award.

The story takes place in midtown Manhattan, New York City, where the protagonist (Blake), attempts to escape his former employee (Miss Dent), who was fired shortly after a one-night stand. Miss Dent eventually catches up to Blake, where they talk on the Five-Forty-Eight train towards Shady Hill.

== Plot ==
"The Five-Forty-Eight" is one of eight tales in Cheever's collection The Housebreaker of Shady Hill and Other Stories, all of which are set in the fictional suburb of Shady Hill. The title refers to a commuter train that carries office workers and executives between Manhattan, New York and the suburbs. The male protagonist, a business executive, is identified only by his surname, Blake.

The story begins with Blake exiting an elevator in the building where he works in New York City, on his way to catch the Five-Forty-Five that will take him home to Shady Hill. Blake is alarmed when he suspects he is being stalked by his former secretary, Miss Dent. Blake fears that she is seeking a confrontation with him. He decides to stop at a men's bar in an attempt to lose his pursuer. As he has a drink, he reflects on his relationship with the woman, and the reader is introduced to the backstory behind the mysterious woman. Miss Dent had been hired by personnel to be Blake's personal secretary several months before. Dent, a young woman of crushingly low self esteem, expressed her affection for Blake by presenting him with a rose, which he discarded in the wastebasket. The reader is informed that Mr. Blake does not like roses. After working together for three weeks, Blake offered to buy her drinks after work. She invited Blake to her apartment where they had a drink and then had sex. The next day Blake waited until she was out for lunch before calling personnel and telling them to fire her. The front office is instructed to bar Miss Dent from the premises.

When Blake takes his seat in the train, he notes that Mrs. Compton, his next door neighbor and confidante to Blake's wife, Louise, is privy to the Blake family marital discord. Sympathetic to Blake's spouse, she glares at Blake and ignores him. Blake notes another neighbor, Mr. Watkins, a free-spirited resident of Shady Hills who rents, but does not own a home. Blake finds his long hair and sandals unsavory, and neither acknowledges the other. Blake looks up to see Miss Dent taking a seat beside him. Miss Dent informs Blake she has a pistol in her pocketbook, and will kill him if he tries to escape. Blake despairs that Mrs. Compton and Mr. Watkins are both utterly unaware or indifferent to his predicament.

Miss Dent explains to Blake how she tried to contact him, and begins to ramble incoherently. She urges Blake to read a letter she has prepared for him. The letter addresses Blake as her husband, details dreams she had and touches on her time spent in a mental hospital. Miss Dent questions whether she should kill him. The train arrives at Shady Hill.

Miss Dent escorts Blake off the train at gunpoint and orders him to his knees, assuring him that she doesn't want to hurt him, merely teach him the lesson he would otherwise be incapable of learning himself. She tells him to put his face in the dirt, Blake does so and begins to weep. Miss Dent, having fulfilled her revenge, explains that she can now wash her hands of Blake and departs. Blake picks himself up and walks home.

== Critical response ==
Magill Book Reviews reviewed "The Five-Forty-Eight" in February 1990. This review talks about the plot and about the character Blake. The review describes Blake's confidence as based on his own "Self-Importance" and nothing more substantial than acting on the "sumptuary laws" of the upper/middle class. The review explains Miss Dent's need to reclaim some of the self-respect she had lost sleeping with Blake. Also, by accomplishing her task of following Blake home to Shady Hill, she had taught him a lesson, and had been more dignified and merciful than Blake. The review questions whether Blake learned his lesson at the end of the story. It is also explained that Blake might be Cheever's most unlikable character, and is remarkable for his callous attitude towards others. He also confuses the sumptuary laws, moral obligations, and human responsibilities he lives by.

Quentin Martin writes about the images within "The Five-Forty-Eight". He explores multiple examples of imagery within the story. First he writes about when Blake was walking in downtown Manhattan and turns to see a plate of glass. Inside that was a domestic model that contained cups of coffee, magazines, and flowers in vases. But, the cups were empty of coffee, the flowers were dead in the vase, and the guests had not come. However Blake saw his own reflection in the plate glass. Martin explains that this illustrates a "false-front emptiness" where Miss Dent thinks Blake's life is full of friendships, money, and a large and loving family but in reality he sleeps in a room by himself, torments his wife, and all but abandoned his son to a neighbor. Martin also states that his domestic woes and ego divided behavior result from his perception that people have wronged him. This makes his behavior as open as the store-front window. He then introduces another image theory about the ride home on the train. Martin explains that the first and third ad, that depict a woman and a man toasting wine and a Hawaiian dancer, show visual manifestations of Blake's and Miss Dent's emotional desolation and psychological dysfunction. One final image that Martin explores is the Cat's Paw ad. A rubber heel placed on the bottom of a shoe to prevent slipping and falling is actually a metaphor for Blake and Miss Dent. When Miss Dent states, "You're the only obstacle between me and my happiness" the first and more literal meaning is that Blake is between her and the station ads that represent the relationship she seeks, but Blake is the heel between Miss Dent and her happiness.

Robert A. Morace gave his views on "The Five-Forty-Eight" in his Author Biography on John Cheever. Morace found "The Five-Forty-Eight" close to another Cheever story "O Youth and Beauty". Morace says that Blake is Cheever's least likable character. While Blake has undergone a change, and for the first time experiences regret, we do not know if his change will be long-lasting. However Miss Dent undergoes real change: with her decision to not kill Blake, she discovers some kindness and saneness within herself that could be put to use.

Philip N Meyer gave his views of "The Five-Forty-Eight" in an article called "The Inside Story". Meyer says that Cheever exposes gender power imbalances, social cruelty and sexual abuse. Meyer adds the view of Charles Baxter, a writer who teaches at the University of Minnesota. Baxter says that Blake as a character is "a completely loathsome suburbanite who keeps up the appearance of gentility in business and at home, but whose inner life is hypocritical and self-deluded". Baxter says that Miss Dent's character is, "a lunatic of sorts, but in Cheever's story she is a messenger of fate. She is the axe to open the frozen sea of Blake's soul."

== Theme ==
"The Five-Forty-Eight" presents a self-complacent suburban male as both sexual predator and coward. As such, Blake is attracted to women who will submit to his misogynistic abuse. Literary critic Patrick Menanor considers it "Cheever's most brilliant treatment of manipulation and victimization...though the story is about cruelty and revenge, it is essentially a character study of Mr. Blake as a soulless automaton, one of Cheever's most revolting sociopaths..." Blake's ultimate humiliation at the hands of the victimized Miss Dent appears to not touch him. Literary critic Lynne Waldeland writes: "No rude awakening into an enlarged humanity has taken place for Blake. The only effect [of his ordeal]...is to make him notice more vividly the homes, the lights, the street signs of Shady Hill, perhaps as symbols of security" that has now been undermined. "His reflections are marked by no thoughts of family and no regret or guilt about his treatment of the woman."

Meanor identifies a thematic device in Cheever's choice of the name Blake for his protagonist: "The ironic use of the name Blake adds to the story's 'heart-versus-head' theme. William Blake, the great [British] transitional poet" was the polar opposite of the cold-blooded rationalist in "The Five-Forty-Eight". The gift that Miss Dent brings to Mr. Blake is a rose, which he instantly discards into a wastebasket because "Mr. Blake doesn't like roses." Meanor points out that "one of William Blake's most famous and enigmatic poems is The Sick Rose, an apt symbol of the corrupting powers of rationalism" that characterized British industrialism and its destructive exploitation and dehumanization of "the poor, vulnerable, and the disenfranchised" textile workers. Miss Dent suffers similar abuse and indignities.

Author Tim Lieder notes that Blake is so hated not because he is awful but because he is average and there is no passion in his life. Even the one moment of passion is undercut by the fact that he wants to get rid of the woman as soon as possible. In that context, his nonchalance in the face of death makes sense.

== Film, TV and theatrical adaptations ==
The story has been adapted for the theatre and also appeared in this form on the radio. It was also adapted into a 1960 episode of Alfred Hitchcock Presents, starring Zachary Scott and Phyllis Thaxter.

A 1979 television adaptation aired on PBS called 3 by Cheever: The 5:48, with Laurence Luckinbill and Mary Beth Hurt in the lead roles.

== Awards and nominations ==
- Winner – 1955 Benjamin Franklin Award

== Sources ==
- Bailey, Blake. 2009 (1). Notes on Text in John Cheever: Collected Stories and Other Writing. The Library of America. Pp.1025-1028 ISBN 978-1-59853-034-6
- Bailey, Blake. 2009 (2). Cheever: A Life. Alfred A. Knopf, New York. 770 pp. ISBN 978-1-4000-4394-1
- Coale, Samuel. 1977. John Cheever. Frederick Ungar Publishing Company, New York. ISBN 0-8044-6081-7
- Meanor, Patrick. 1995. John Cheever Revisited. Twayne Publishers, New York. ISBN 0-8057-3999-8
- O'Hara, James E. 1989. John Cheever: A Study of the Short Fiction. Twayne Publishers, Boston Massachusetts. Twayne Studies in Short Fiction no 9. ISBN 0-8057-8310-5*Waldeland, Lynne. 1979. John Cheever. Twayne Publishers, G. K. Hall & Company, Boston, Massachusetts. ISBN 0-8057-7251-0
- Waldeland, Lynne. 1979. John Cheever. Twayne Publishers, G. K. Hall & Company, Boston, Massachusetts. ISBN 0-8057-7251-0
