= The Housebreaker of Shady Hill and Other Stories =

- First edition cover
- Author: John Cheever
- Language: English
- Publisher: Harper & Bros.
- Publication date: 1958
- Publication place: United States
- Media type: Print (hardcover)
- Pages: 185
- ISBN: 0523123183

The Housebreaker of Shady Hill and Other Stories is a collection of short fiction by John Cheever. Composed of eight short stories, the volume was first published by Harper & Bros. in 1958. Reissued by Hillman/MacFadden in 1961, the works are included in The Stories of John Cheever (1978). The works were originally published individually in The New Yorker.

All the stories are set in the fictional New England town of Shady Hill, where the suburbanite residents exist in an allegorical Hades: "a nice house with a garden and a place outside for cooking meat," and where "there was no turpitude; there had not been a divorce…there had not even been a breath of scandal."

== Stories ==
The date of publication in The New Yorker appears in parentheses.:
"O Youth and Beauty!" (August 22, 1953)
"The Sorrows of Gin" (December 12, 1953)
"The Five-Forty-Eight" (August 10, 1954)
"The Country Husband" (November 20, 1954)
"The Housebreaker of Shady Hill" (April 4, 1956)
"The Worm in the Apple"
"Just Tell Me Who It Was" (April 16, 1955)
"The Trouble of Marcie Flint" (November 9, 1957)

== Reception ==
With this, the third of his short fiction collections, Cheever established himself as the chronicler "who mythologized modern American suburban life." Contemporary critical reaction to the volume noted Cheever's "growing significance" as a literary figure, but a number of reviewers detected "something a little vapid about the work."

Citing biographer Scott Donaldson, Patrick Meanor points out "that some critics were not pleased with the idea of a writer making the suburbs the subject matter of his work. Many of these critics were New Yorkers, some of the working-class social strata of the Lower East Side who found little or no means of identifying with the problems of the relatively comfortable, college-educated business executives. The unapologetic socialist critics' worst enemies were those WASPs whom Cheever wrote so passionately about. Even worse, he wrote about them with humor, compassion, and deep understanding, while simultaneously avoiding any obvious ethical or moral judgment on their life-style."

== Critical assessment ==
Published during the period between Cheever's first two novels, The Wapshot Chronicle (1957) and The Wapshot Scandal (1964), The Housebreaker of Shady Hill and Other Stories may be termed "novelistic" in effect, as are Sherwood Anderson's Winesburg, Ohio (1919) and Ernest Hemingway's In Our Time (1925).

Biographer Lynne Waldeland considers The Housebreaker of Shady Hill and Other Stories "a collection of uniformly high quality" and containing "some of the finest short stories of the twentieth century." adding this caveat:

If there is any weakness in these stories, it is Cheever's reliance on sudden, fortuitous escapes from or alleviations of his character's difficulties. The crisis in these people's live are real and painful, but the ends of the crisis come so abruptly, and in some cases, so implausibly, that it may be hard for the reader to feel their seriousness.

Literary critic Eileen Battersby contends that the collection includes some "works of genius."

== Sources ==
- Battersby, Eileen. 2010. "Great Writer Deserves Better". The Irish Times, January 2, 2010. Retrieved November 2, 2022
- Bailey, Blake. 2009 (1). Notes on the Text in John Cheever: Collected Stories and Other Writing. The Library of America. pp. 1025-1028 ISBN 978-1-59853-034-6
- Bailey, Blake. 2009 (2). Cheever: A Life. Alfred A. Knopf, New York. 770 pp. ISBN 978-1-4000-4394-1
- Leonard, John. 1978. "Dreaming Against the Darkness: On The Stories of John Cheever". The New York Times, November 7, 1978. Reprinted in Book Marks Reviews. Retrieved November 3, 2022.
- Meanor, Patrick. 1995. John Cheever Revisited. Twayne Publishers, New York. ISBN 0-8057-3999-8
- Updike, John. 2009. "Basically Decent". The New Yorker, March 1, 2009. Retrieved November 2, 2022.
- Waldeland, Lynne. 1979. John Cheever. Twayne Publishers, G. K. Hall & Company, Boston, Massachusetts. ISBN 0-8057-7251-0
- Yardley, Jonathan. 2004. "John Cheever's 'Housebreaker,' Welcome as Ever", The Washington Post, July 20, 2004. Retrieved November 2, 2022.
