= The Five Forty-Eight =

- Based on: The Five-Forty-Eight by John Cheever
- Screenplay by: Terrence McNally
- Directed by: James Ivory
- Starring: Laurence Luckinbill; Mary Beth Hurt
- Music by: Jonathan Tunick
- Country of origin: United States
- Original language: English

Production
- Executive producer: Jac Venza
- Producer: Peter Weinberg
- Cinematography: Andrzej Bartkowiak
- Editor: David E. McKenna
- Production company: WNET

Original release
- Network: PBS
- Release: November 7, 1979

The Five Forty Eight is a 1979 American television adaptation of John Cheever's short story of the same name, directed by James Ivory.

== Cast ==
- Laurence Luckinbill as Blake
- Mary Beth Hurt as Miss Dent
- Laurinda Barrett as Louise Blake
- Dale Hodges as Receptionist
- Kathy Keeney as Anne Blake
- Philip Scher as Charlie Blake
- Jon De Vries as Henry Watkins
- Nicholas Luckinbill as Tad Watkins
- Ann McDonough as June Thorpe
- Robert Hitt as Price
- Tiger Haynes as Guard
- Susan Hovey as Girl in elevator
- John Ramsey as Bartender
- John Harkins as Trace Bearden
- Adam Petroski as Conductor
