= Parc (film) =

- Promotional poster
- Directed by: Arnaud des Pallières
- Written by: John Cheever; Arnaud des Pallières
- Produced by: Marie Guirauden; Serge Lalou
- Starring: Sergi López; Jean-Marc Barr; Geraldine Chaplin; Nathalie Richard
- Cinematography: Jeanne Lapoirie
- Edited by: Arnaud des Pallières
- Music by: Martin Wheeler
- Distributed by: Ad Vitam Distribution
- Release dates: 11 September 2008 (Toronto); 14 January 2009 (France)
- Running time: 109 minutes
- Country: France
- Language: French
- Budget: $2.8 million
- Box office: $96.000

Parc is a 2008 French drama film directed by Arnaud des Pallières. The film is based on John Cheever's 1969 novel Bullet Park. The film stars Sergi López, Jean-Marc Barr and Geraldine Chaplin. The film had its international premiere at the 2008 Toronto International Film Festival on 11 September.

== Plot ==
Georges Clou (Lopez) is a successful salesman, enjoying the fruits of his labour as a resident of an exclusive gated community in the French Riviera. His life is seemingly idyllic, a beautiful home, a loving wife and a son. Appearances are deceptive as this idyllic vision is spoiled by the traumas his teenage son endures. Elsewhere in the community, Paul Marteau (Barr), arrives with a troubled past and uncertain future.

== Cast ==
- Sergi López as Georges Clou
- Jean-Marc Barr as Paul Marteau
- Geraldine Chaplin as La mère de Marteau
- Nathalie Richard as Hélène Clou
- Laurent Delbecque as Toni Clou
- Delphine Chuillot as Evelyn Marteau
- Jean-Pierre Kalfon as Le propriétaire
- László Szabó as Le guérisseur Balthazar Rutuola

== Production ==
For the adaptation, the filmmaker transported the script from the United States to the French Riviera, with most of the action taking place around Nice.

== Reception ==
Positif described the film as "a curious fusion between the world of Chabrol and Lynch that awakens a riot of empathic anti-establishment feeling".
