= 55 Short Stories from the New Yorker =

New Yorker Magazine

- First edition
- Author: Various
- Language: English
- Genre: Literary
- Published: 1949 (Simon & Schuster)
- Publication place: United States
- Media type: Print (hardback & paperback)
- Pages: 480 pp
- OCLC: 768510
- LC Class: PZ1. F46654

55 Short Stories from the New Yorker is a literary anthology of short fiction first published in The New Yorker magazine from the years 1940 through 1949.

== Front Cover ==
Although the magazine debuted in February 1925 (so that its 25th anniversary was in 1950), this 1949 book's subtitle reads, "A twenty-fifth anniversary volume of stories that have appeared in the magazine during the last decade." As with the annual anniversary issue of the eponymous magazine, the cover depicts Eustace Tilley with his monocle, in the classic iconograph.

The cover subtitles also include "1940 to 1950," but the copyright date of 1949 suggests that material from 1950, and possibly the latter part of 1949, was not included; individual years listed after "copyright" also recite each of the years in the 1940s, but not 1950.

== Contents ==
- John Cheever, "The Enormous Radio"
- Kay Boyle, "Defeat"
- John McNulty, "Man Here Keeps Getting Arrested All the Time"
- Victoria Lincoln, "Down in the Reeds by the River"
- Robert M. Coates, "A Winter in the Country"
- James Thurber, "The Catbird Seat"
- Sally Benson, "Lady with a Lamp"
- Irwin Shaw, "Act of Faith"
- Ludwig Bemelmans, "The Ballet Visits the Splendide’s Magician"
- Hortense Calisher, "The Middle Drawer"
- Rhys Davies, "The Dilemma of Catherine Fuchsias"
- Elizabeth Parsons, "The Nightingales Sing"
- E. B. White, "The Second Tree from the Corner"
- Wendell Wilcox, "The Pleasures of Travel"
- John Andrew Rice, "Content with the Station"
- J. D. Salinger, "A Perfect Day for Bananafish"
- William Maxwell, "The Patterns of Love"
- Shirley Jackson, "The Lottery"
- Mary McCarthy, "Yonder Peasant, Who Is He?"
- John O’Hara, "The Decision"
- Christine Weston, "Her Bed Is India"
- Russell Maloney, "Inflexible Logic"
- Frances Gray Patton, "The Falling Leaves"
- Frank O’Connor, "My Da"
- Edward Newhouse, "The Four Freedoms"
- Sylvia Townsend Warner, "A View of Exmoor"
- Jean Stafford, "Children Are Bored on Sunday"
- Oliver La Farge, "Mr. Skidmore’s Gift"
- Robert McLaughlin, "A Short Wait Between Trains"
- Astrid Peters, "Party at the Williamsons'"
- Jerome Weidman, "Monsoon"
- Wolcott Gibbs, "Song at Twilight"
- A. J. Liebling, "Run, Run, Run, Run"
- Carson McCullers, "The Jockey"
- Bessie Breuer, "Pigeons en Casserole"
- Roger Angell, "A Killing"
- Mollie Panter-Downes, "Goodbye, My Love"
- Vladimir Nabokov, "Colette"
- Daniel Fuchs, "A Clean, Quiet House"
- James A. Maxwell, "A Village Incident"
- John Collier, "De Mortuis..."
- Robert Gorham Davis, "Then We’ll Set It Right"
- Jessamyn West, "The Mysteries of Life in an Orderly Manner"
- Peter Taylor, "Porte-Cochere"
- Niccolò Tucci, "The Evolution of Knowledge"
- Mark Schorer, "Continued Humid"
- Emily Hahn, "The Baby-Amah"
- Brendan Gill, "Truth and Consequences"
- Nancy Hale, "Between the Dark and the Daylight"
- James Reid Parker, "The Judgment of Paris"
- Christopher La Farge, "Mary Mulcahy"
- John Powell, "The Bummers"
- Isabel Bolton, "Under Gemini"
- S. N. Behrman, "The Improvement in Mr. Gaynor’s Technique"
- Marjorie Kinnan Rawlings, "Black Secret"

== Editorial comment ==
In the short Foreword, the editors state that "[s]ome notable stories are missing" for purposes of balance, and also that "parody, nonsense, and casual essays" have been excluded as "outside the scope of this book." There is a conventional table of contents and an index lists each story alphabetically by its author's last name. There is no other content, except the stories themselves.

== Binding ==
The third paperback printing is bound in matte paper, and is 5.25 in × 8 in (133 mm × 203 mm) in size, approximately the size of a trade paperback in 2006.
