= The Country Husband =

- Short story by John Cheever
- Country: United States
- Language: English

Publication
- Published in: The New Yorker
- Publication date: November 20, 1954

"The Country Husband" is a short story by John Cheever which first appeared in The New Yorker on November 20, 1954. The work was included in the collection of Cheever's short fiction The Housebreaker of Shady Hill and Other Stories (1958) published by Harper and Brothers. The story also appears in The Stories of John Cheever (1978).

"The Country Husband" is the first of the eight stories that Cheever set in the fictional suburban community of Shady Hill, and the best known of these works.

The story won the O. Henry Award in January 1956.

A film adaptation of the same name aired as part of the CBS anthology drama series Playhouse 90 in November 1956.

== Plot ==
Francis Weed, father of four young children and husband to Julia, is a resident of the solidly middle-class suburb of Shady Hill.

Returning from a business trip, Francis' commuter plane makes an emergency crash landing, but he and the terrified passengers emerge unscathed. The experience leaves him deeply shaken. When Francis arrives home with the tale of his survival, his wife and children are too preoccupied with their own personal affairs to register any sympathy. His presence in the household seems superfluous.

Francis and Julia attend a cocktail party. He notes that the maid who is serving drinks is vaguely familiar, then he recognizes her. During his service as an infantryman in France during World War II, he had witnessed the public chastening of a woman who had served as a consort to a German officer during the German military occupation. Her head had been shaved and, stripped naked, she was paraded through the village. The maid is the same woman. Francis is troubled by the encounter but dares not share it with Julia or his hosts. A retelling of this wartime ordeal would be deemed a violation of the sheltered and secure post-war world of Shady Hill.

Francis drives the teenage babysitter, Anne Murchison, to her home that evening. She reveals during the ride that her father is an abusive and notorious alcoholic. Anne's evident suffering produces a powerful impulse in Francis combining both tenderness and sexual attraction. Anne innocently gives the sympathetic middle-aged man a childish kiss when they part. Francis begins to indulge in delightful fantasies about Anne, which fill him with a sense of youthful vitality and optimism. Suffering the joyful agonies of a young lover, he dreams of escaping from Shady Hill with the girl. His eyes no longer jaded, he discovers the beauty of the landscapes of the community in which he lives. He doesn't realize that she's avoiding him, and when he discovers that she has a boyfriend, he does everything possible to ruin the boyfriend's life.

Francis encounters the officious Mrs. Wrightson on the commuter train platform. She is a leading figure in Shady Hill social affairs. Francis, impatient with her self-absorbed remarks, abandons decorum and insults her purposefully, telling her to "shut up." The woman departs in shocked silence.

Julia learns of her husband's rudeness towards Mrs. Wrightson when the Weed family is excluded from the guest list for the annual Shady Hill dance party. This bars their eldest daughter, the teenager Helen, from attending. The contretemps unleashes a sustained tirade of resentments and discontents that Julia has long harbored against Francis. He hits her. She threatens to leave him but relents when he begs her to stay.

Obsessive fantasies about Anne continue to plague Francis. He sees her on the commuter train, but when he approaches, he discovers it is a hallucination. In desperation, Francis visits a psychiatrist, Dr. Herzog, who recommends that he take up woodworking as a form of therapy.

Francis relinquishes his emotional anarchy and makes his peace with the denizens of Shady Hill, resigned to his suburban existence.

== Critical assessment ==
Literary critic Jonathan Yardley offers this praise:

"The Country Husband' is close to a perfect short story. In the brief space of perhaps 10,000 words Cheever creates characters whom we see in full; he portrays the exterior and interior lives of Francis Weed with astonishing complexity and subtlety; he gets the suburban ambiance exactly right; he depicts with heartbreaking accuracy the sudden onslaught of love and the tidal wave of emotions carried with it; he gives us a man in thrall to lust...but who is faithful, in the end, to his own essential decency and moral sturdiness.

"Some critics suggest "The Country Husband" is Cheever's greatest story. None other than Vladimir Nabokov called it 'a miniature novel beautifully traced.' Rarely has Cheever packed so much diversity into one story: elements of myth; literary, artistic, and geographical allusions; and the old Puritan battleground between the flesh and the spirit, Dionysus versus Apollo."— Literary critic Patrick Meanor in John Cheever Revisited (1995).

Literary critic John E. O'Hara makes this observation about Cheever's finest works, among these "The Country Husband":

...Just enough is said, and just enough withheld, for the reader to catch a glimpse of the mysterious something that makes us human. For all his shortcomings, John Cheever knew that something well. To his great credit, to the very end he remained obsessed with the ethical conduct that gives life shape and meaning, and the record of his moral soundings is to be found in all his published works.

Biographer Lynne Waldeland rates "The Country Husband" as "perhaps the best story in the collection."

More contemporary critics pay more attention to the casual sexism and the self-deluding nature of the protagonist. According to Nasrullah Mambrol, "the contrast between the subdued Francis Weed and the elevated language is comic or ironic or just plain sad, depending on one's interpretation."

== Sources ==
- Bailey, Blake. 2009. Notes on Text in John Cheever: Collected Stories and Other Writing. The Library of America. Pp. 1025-1028 ISBN 978-1-59853-034-6
- Coale, Samuel. 1977. John Cheever. Frederick Ungar Publishing Company, New York. ISBN 0-8044-6081-7
- Donaldson, Scott. 1988. John Cheever: A Biography. Random House, New York. ISBN 0-394-54921-X
- Meanor, Patrick. 1995. John Cheever Revisited. Twayne Publishers, New York. ISBN 0-8057-3999-8
- O'Hara, James E. 1989. John Cheever: A Study of the Short Fiction. Twayne Publishers, Boston Massachusetts. Twayne Studies in Short Fiction no 9. ISBN 0-8057-8310-5
- Waldeland, Lynne. 1979. John Cheever. Twayne Publishers, G. K. Hall & Company, Boston, Massachusetts. ISBN 0-8057-7251-0
- Yardley, Jonathan. 2004. John Cheever's 'Housebreaker,' Welcome as Ever. The Washington Post, July 20, 2004. https://www.washingtonpost.com/wp-dyn/content/article/2004/07/20/AR2005033101176.html Retrieved November 2, 2022.
