= The Seaside Houses =

- Short story by John Cheever
- Country: United States
- Language: English

Publication
- Published in: The New Yorker
- Publication date: July 29, 1961

"The Seaside Houses" is a short story by John Cheever which first appeared in The New Yorker on July 29, 1961. The work was included in the short fiction collection The Brigadier and the Golf Widow (1964), published by Harper and Row.

The story is considered one of the most outstanding of the works in the collection. "The Seaside Houses" is included in The Stories of John Cheever (1978).

== Plot ==
The Ogden family rents a lovely seaside house for their summer vacation in New England. Mr. Ogden is intrigued with the residence, named Broadmere, which presents an array of tell-tale clues concerning its former long-term renters, the Greenwoods, who just recently occupied the premises. He begins a desultory inventory of the remaining artifacts, which gradually reveal the character of Mr. Greenwood. The interior of the house is drab, ill-lit and oppressive. Mr. Ogden discovers empty whiskey bottles discarded behind bookshelves, under the piano bench, and concealed outdoors on the property. In his own son's bedroom, he finds a secret message scrawled in another child's hand: "My father is a rat. I repeat. My father is a rat." Mr. Ogden makes an additional discovery: pornographic magazines under the sofa cushions; outraged, he burns these in the fireplace.

Mr. Ogden has a troubling dream: he finds himself in an Italian tavern at closing time. The bartender refuses to mix him a drink. In desperation, Mr. Ogden pays 10,000 lire for a bottle of gin. Ogden recalls: "When I woke, it seemed that I had dreamed one of Mr. Greenwood's dreams."

In a conversation with the property manager, Mrs. Whiteside, Mr. Ogden extracts from her information concerning Mr. Greenwood's business and domestic affairs, while plying her with liquor. This reveals that Mr. Greenwood has apparently experienced a number of disastrous setbacks.

The Ogden's cook announces a medical emergency in her family and departs. Mr. Ogden quarrels with his young son over trivialities. Increasingly irritable with his wife and children, he escapes Broadmere for a brief trip to New York, purportedly on business. Purely by coincidence, Mr. Ogden encounters Mr. Greenwood at a bar in Grand Central Station, whom he instantly recognizes from a photograph at Broadmere. He observes the man, but does not introduce himself. Ogden quickly discerns that the man is an ill-tempered, disaffected and demoralized drunkard. Ogden has a one-night stand with a female office employee and returns to Broadmere with a hangover. Upon his arrival, Mr. Ogden and his wife clash in a sharp and uncompromising verbal dispute which leads to their immediate separation. Ogden reports: "We had been married twelve years ... and I never saw her again."

The story ends with a coda. Ogden has remarried and is living at another seaside rental, but in distinctly reduced financial circumstances. He is an inveterate alcoholic. His wife is a demanding shrew. Ogden suffers acutely from self-pityingly memories of his abandonment of his first wife.

== Theme and style ==
"The protagonist begins to detect himself in the desiccated image of Broadmere's former inhabitant, Mr. Greenwood ... Ogden becomes a secret sharer of Greenwood's ruin by pursuing various clues that lie about the house ... he becomes so involved in tracing Greenwood's descent that Ogden becomes a virtual doppelgänger, or alter ego, of Greenwood, and in pursuing his fate, he discovers his own."—Literary critic Patrick Meanor in John Cheever Revisited (1995)

Literary critic Patrick Meanor places "The Seaside Houses" among those 19th Century literary works that deal with the persistence of ghost-like occupants in abandoned houses: "Cheever, along with Poe, Hawthorne, and Henry James, had a gift for detecting the haunted and haunting residue of houses' past occupants." Demonstrating a masterful grasp of this theme, Cheever describes the gradual infiltration of Greenwood's character into that of Mr. Ogden. Meanor continues: "The house, a classic Jungian symbol of the unconscious, combines with dreams and the sea to symbolized Ogden's discovery that he and Greenwood are virtually the same person, a realization that simultaneously informs and terrifies him."

Tim Lieder notes the parallels to The Scarlet Moving Van but notes that the narrator is pursuing the harbinger of doom instead of ending up at the same dinner parties

Literary critic Lynne Waldeland recognizes a theme common in Cheever's work, "that people leave their presences in rooms and houses." Mr. Ogden feels compelled to discover Mr. Greenwood's personal history and his character. He obsessively pursues the man who seems to haunt Broadmere. In doing so, he ultimately assumes the degenerate character of Mr. Greenwood. Stylistically, Cheever's handling of Ogden's inexorable fate adds to the "horror." Literary critic Samuel Coale writes:

The straightforward and dispassionate prose that of Cheever's style underplays the developing horror of Greenwood's legacy ... His apparent objectivity and calm are maintained throughout but only seem to increase the unhealthiness of [Ogden's] transformation ...

Coale adds that Cheever's "controlled and calculated" chronicleing of Ogden's descent exposes its sinister character. Ultimately, Mr. Ogden achieves a degree of self-enlightenment, but at tremendous cost. Patrick Meanor writes:

"The Seaside Houses" is a story that traces an Icarus-like fall from a condition of ignorance into knowledge that permanently alters the [Mr. Ogden's] naive view of life ... The conclusion of the story finds an alcoholic Ogden [who has] entered the fallen world in which he and his new wife, who resembles a whore, inhabit another, but much seedier, seaside house ..."

== Sources ==
- Bailey, Blake. 2009. Notes on Text in John Cheever: Collected Stories and Other Writing. The Library of America. Pp.1025-1028 ISBN 978-1-59853-034-6
- Cheever, John. 2009. John Cheever: Collected Stories and Other Writing. The Library of America. ISBN 978-1-59853-034-6
- O'Hara, James E. 1989. John Cheever: A Study of the Short Fiction. Twayne Publishers, Boston Massachusetts. Twayne Studies in Short Fiction no 9. ISBN 0-8057-8310-5
- Meanor, Patrick. 1995. John Cheever Revisited. Twayne Publishers, New York. ISBN 0-8057-3999-8
- Waldeland, Lynne. 1979. John Cheever. Twayne Publishers, G. K. Hall & Company, Boston, Massachusetts. ISBN 0-8057-7251-0
