= The Hartleys =

- Short story by John Cheever
- Country: United States
- Language: English

Publication
- Published in: The New Yorker
- Publication date: January 22, 1949

"The Hartleys" is a work of short fiction by John Cheever, first published in The New Yorker on January 22, 1949. The story was included in The Enormous Radio and Other Stories (1953), and in The Stories of John Cheever (1978).

The story centers on the winter ski vacation of the Hartley family of New York City that ends in tragedy at a New England resort.

== Plot ==
The story unfolds at a well-appointed New England ski resort. Mr. and Mrs. Hartley have arrived from New York City with their only child, the seven-year-old Anne. The Hartleys had once enjoyed a vacation at the fictional Pemaquoddy Inn eight years previous. After a brief separation, the couple is on a quest to rekindle a formerly close relationship that is disintegrating, held together only by their daughter. Anne's conception was likely an effort by the Hartleys to preserve their marriage.

Anne is obsessively attached to her father, and becomes alternately hysterical or depressed at his absence, who senses the parental discord. An alcohol-driven outburst by Mrs. Hartley reveals the futility of the couple's escapist efforts to sustain their marriage: "Why do we have to make these trips back to places we thought we were happy? What good is it going to do? What good has it ever done?"

The trip ends in the accidental death of Anne, who is crushed in the gears of a ski slope towing wheel. The story closes with the Hartleys departing the resort, following the hearse that carries their dead child.

== Theme ==
Among the stories first collected in The Enormous Radio and Other Stories (1953), "The Hartleys" is Cheever's "earliest and clearest expression of the most important theme" characterizing the volume: the doomed search for the resurrection of an idyllic past. Literary critic Lynne Waldeland comments on Hartley's tragic quest:

Mr. and Mrs.Hartley are engaged in frantically revisiting places where they had been happy in the past to try to recapture those feelings…The futility of this search turns to tragedy; their daughter is killed in an accident on a ski tow, a hostage to their ill-fated attempt to reestablish a meaningful relationship by reliving the past.

Biographer Patrick Meanor notes that "The Hartleys" is "one of Cheever's most brutally sad stories and the most bitterly ironic story in the collection."

Writer and critic Tim Lieder praises the understated narrative and the way that the ending fulfils the sad family dynamic. He notes that many lesser writers have written stories with shock endings that feel cheap but Cheever carries it off with style. The also noted that it fits with the theme of doomed child of bad parent.

== Sources ==
- Bailey, Blake. 2009. Notes on Text in John Cheever: Collected Stories and Other Writing. The Library of America. pp.1025-1028 ISBN 978-1-59853-034-6
- Meanor, Patrick. 1995. John Cheever Revisited. Twayne Publishers, New York. ISBN 0-8057-3999-8
- O'Hara, James E. 1989. John Cheever: A Study of the Short Fiction. Twayne Publishers, Boston Massachusetts. Twayne Studies in Short Fiction no 9. ISBN 0-8057-8310-5
- Waldeland, Lynne. 1979. John Cheever. Twayne Publishers, G. K. Hall & Co., Boston, Massachusetts. ISBN 0-8057-7251-0
