= The Swimmer (short story) =

Short story by John Cheever

- Short story by John Cheever
- Country: United States
- Language: English

Publication
- Published in: The New Yorker
- Publication date: July 18, 1964

"The Swimmer" is a short story by American author John Cheever. It was originally published in The New Yorker on July 18, 1964, and later in the short-fiction collections The Brigadier and the Golf Widow (1964) and The Stories of John Cheever (1978). Considered one of the author's most outstanding works, "The Swimmer" has received exhaustive analysis from critics and biographers.

In 1968, "The Swimmer" was adapted into a film of the same name, starring Burt Lancaster. This is the only literary work by Cheever that has appeared on screen. "The Swimmer" is also a crucial plot reference in the 2023 film A Brighter Tomorrow.

== Plot ==
The story is told mostly from a third-person limited point-of-view, in which the focal character is Neddy Merrill, a resident of suburban Westchester County, New York. The story shifts briefly to an omniscient narrator after the first break (“Had you gone for a Sunday afternoon ride...”) showing Neddy as an observer might have seen him.

In midsummer, Neddy is lounging poolside at the residence of his well-to-do neighbors, the Westerhazys. Though entering middle age, he appears to possess a supreme optimism. On a whim, he conceives of returning to his home, located eight miles away, by way of the swimming pools of fourteen suburban couples, all friends or acquaintances of his. Styling himself a new-age explorer, he dubs the series of pools the "Lucinda River" in honor of his wife.

Initially, he is greeted warmly by friends and associates, and imbibes alcoholic beverages they offer him along the way. Despite the ever-present afternoon light, it becomes unclear how much time has passed. Threatening storm clouds gather.

Midway through his journey, some of Neddy's friends mention his serious financial misfortunes, although he seems unaware of these. He meets with undisguised hostility at the poolside party of the Biswangers, a couple whom Neddy and Lucinda have persistently snubbed. At the home of Eric Sachs, one of Neddy's closest friends, he is informed by Sachs' wife that Eric survived a life-threatening operation three years prior, of which Neddy has no recollection. At the pool of his discarded mistress, Shirley Adams, she informs him that she will not lend him any more money or serve him a drink, and dismisses him.

Neddy's physical strength declines precipitously, and it becomes painful for him to swim the length of each pool. He is further disoriented when he feels a chill in the air, and notices the constellations of autumn rather than summer in the darkening skies. The normally stoic swimmer begins to weep.

Neddy staggers to his home to find it empty, locked, and damaged, and is unable to enter.

== Background ==
The story, originally conceived as a novel and pared down from over 150 pages of notes, is among Cheever's most famous and frequently anthologized. As published, the story is highly praised for its blend of realism and surrealism; the thematic exploration of suburban America, especially the relationship between wealth and happiness; and his use of myth and symbolism.

According to critic Scott Donaldson, the composition of "The Swimmer" was a protracted struggle which occupied Cheever for two months. He described the "terribly difficult" ordeal in an interview with Alexandra Grant:

I couldn't ever show my hand. Night was falling, the year was dying. It wasn't a question of technical problems, but one of imponderables. When he finds it dark and cold, it has to have happened. And by God, it did happen. I felt dark and cold for some time after I finished that story.

Cheever biographer Scott Donaldson reports that "it was the last story [Cheever] wrote for a long time."

== Critical assessment ==
"The Swimmer" is widely regarded as one of Cheever's "genuine masterpieces" and perhaps the finest piece of short fiction in his oeuvre. The work is frequently anthologized. Donaldson writes that "The Swimmer" has received "as much critical attention as anything Cheever wrote, and deservedly so, since it is beautifully crafted and carries a powerful emotional charge."

W. B. Gooderham of The New York Times writes: "Cheever's greatest short story transcends its influences and any autobiographical frisson to emerge as a quietly devastating journey into one man's heart of darkness. And as a piece of prose it is as near-miraculous as the journey it describes…"

== Theme ==
Cheever's original concept for "The Swimmer" was a straightforward retelling of the Greek myth of Narcissus. He recalled:

When I began, the story was to have been a simple one about Narcissus. I started with the image of that boy looking into the water. Then I thought...it's absurd to limit him to a tight mythological plot - being trapped in his own image, in a single pool. This man loves swimming! So in my first version I let him out, and he swam in an immense number of pools- thirty of them! But then I began to narrow it down, and narrow it down, and something began happening. It was growing cold and quiet. It was turning into winter.

Cheever deepened the metaphoric and mythic elements. Biographer Patrick Meanor identifies several layers of ancient myth and legend in Cheever's story. Among these are references to the Arthurian quest for the Holy Grail and the Fisher King, the Odyssey, and Dante's Inferno.

Meanor also notes "an ethnic arrangement" for the names of the couples Neddy Merrill encounters, beginning with the Scottish and English surnames of WASPs, then to surnames associated with "German to the Jewish to the Irish." He also detects an underlying "water metaphor" in the roots of these names.

“The countless drinks along the way are part of a larger pattern of willful oblivion, repressing problems so troubling that they cannot be raised to the surface of consciousness. We now see that like Chekhovian characters…Neddy Merrill has in fact chosen to lose touch with the truth rather than suffer under its crushing weight.”

— James E. O’Hara in John Cheever: A Study of the Short Fiction (1989)

Literary critic Lynne Waldeland contends that Neddy's aim in swimming home is more than mere amusement: "the real point of the story is the celebratory motive of Neddy's act with the social realities that emerge as the story progresses, realities that have to do with the role wealth and social status play in the world which Neddy wishes to invest with legendary beauty and meaning...Whatever 'happened' we have seen a brightly lit, intelligible, comfortable world suddenly become dark and cold. The story, like a nightmare, leaves the reader with a residual uneasiness."

Literary critic Samuel Coale observes that "The Swimmer" confronts both Cheever's protagonist and the reader with a shocking epiphany:

...the stunning truth of these disasters at the end of the story undercuts totally Neddy's own self-gratifying celebration of the suburban existence…Cheever carefully laid the trail toward the deserted house, so that when the reader arrives there, he is stunned by the transformation that takes place between his first impressions of Neddy Merrill and his final understanding.

== Sources ==
- Bailey, Blake. 2009 (1). Notes on Text in John Cheever: Collected Stories and Other Writing. The Library of America. Pp.1025-1028 ISBN 978-1-59853-034-6
- Bailey, Blake. 2009 (2). Cheever: A Life. Alfred A. Knopf, New York. 770 pp. ISBN 978-1-4000-4394-1
- Coale, Samuel. 1977. John Cheever. Frederick Ungar Publishing Company, New York. ISBN 0-8044-6081-7
- Donaldson, Scott. 1988. John Cheever: A Biography. Random House, New York. ISBN 0-394-54921-X
- Gooderham, WB (October 31, 2015). "The Swimmer by John Cheever – into a suburban darkness". The Guardian.
- Leithauser, Brad (May 30, 2012). "Cheever's Art of the Devantating Phrase". The New Yorker.
- Meanor, Patrick. 1995. John Cheever Revisited. Twayne Publishers, New York. ISBN 0-8057-3999-8
- O'Hara, James E. 1989. John Cheever: A Study of the Short Fiction. Twayne Publishers, Boston Massachusetts. Twayne Studies in Short Fiction no 9. ISBN 0-8057-8310-5
- Waldeland, Lynne. 1979. John Cheever. Twayne Publishers, G. K. Hall & Company, Boston, Massachusetts. ISBN 0-8057-7251-0
- Yardley, Jonathan (July 20, 2004). "John Cheever's 'Housebreaker,' Welcome as Ever". The Washington Post.

=== Bibliography ===
- Cheever, John (1964). "The Swimmer". The New Yorker.
- Kuiper, Kathleen (2011). "The Swimmer: story by Cheever". Encyclopaedia Britannica.
- Wilson, Kathleen (1997). Short Stories for Students. Gale. pp. 278–94.
