= Bullet Park =

Novel by John Cheever

- First edition
- Author: John Cheever
- Cover artist: Paul Bacon
- Language: English
- Publisher: Knopf
- Publication date: 1969
- Publication place: United States
- Media type: Print
- Pages: 245

Bullet Park is a 1969 novel by American novelist John Cheever about an earnest yet pensive father Eliot Nailles and his troubled son Tony, and their predestined fate with a psychotic man Hammer, who moves to Bullet Park to sacrifice one of them.

== Adaptations ==
In 2008, the novel was adapted into a French-language film, Parc.

In 2009, Audible.com produced an audio version of Bullet Park, narrated by Marc Vietor, as part of its Modern Vanguard line of audiobooks.
