= The Enormous Radio and Other Stories =

1953 book of short fiction by John Cheever

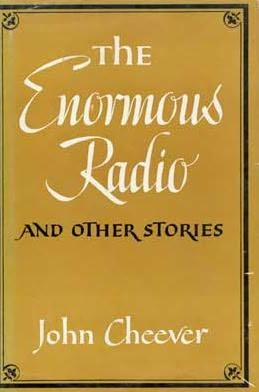
- First edition cover
- Author: John Cheever
- Language: English
- Publisher: Funk and Wagnalls
- Publication date: 1953
- Publication place: United States
- Media type: Print (hardcover)
- Pages: 237
- ISBN: 978-0871-919595
- LC Class: PZ3.C3983 En, PS3505.H6428

The Enormous Radio and Other Stories is a collection of short fiction by John Cheever published in 1953 by Funk and Wagnalls. All fourteen stories were first published individually in The New Yorker. These works are included in The Stories of John Cheever (1978) published by Alfred A. Knopf.

== Stories ==
The date of publication in The New Yorker appears in parentheses.

- "The Sutton Place Story" (June 29, 1946)
- "The Enormous Radio" (May 17, 1947)
- "Torch Song" (October 4, 1947)
- "O City of Broken Dreams" (January 24, 1948)
- "The Summer Farmer" (August 7, 1948)
- "The Hartleys" (January 22, 1949)
- "Christmas is a Sad Season for the Poor" (December 24, 1949)
- "The Season of Divorce" (March 4, 1950)
- "The Pot of Gold" (October 14, 1950)
- "Clancy in the Tower of Babel" (March 24, 1951)
- "Goodbye, My Brother" (August 25, 1951)
- "The Children" (March 6, 1952)
- "The Superintendent" (March 29, 1952)
- "The Cure" (July 3, 1952)

== Publication history ==
Cheever, in an effort to see a selection of his stories published in the 1940s with The New Yorker collected in a volume, approached Random House's Robert Linscott: Cheever had been under contract with the publisher to deliver a novel since 1946. Linscott demurred, and Cheever arranged to have fourteen stories printed by Funk and Wagnalls, a publisher of encyclopedias.

== Reception ==
Literary critic James Kelly of The New York Times Book Review, praised Cheever's "miraculous expressions" in describing the denizens of the petty-bourgeois New England suburbs, a genre of which Kelly identifies the author as a literary master. William Peden of The Saturday Evening Post, though ranking Cheever among "the most undervalued American short story writers", regarded The Enormous Radio and Other Stories as inferior to author J. D. Salinger's short fiction collection Nine Stories (1953), as did critic Alfred Mizener in The New Republic. Blake Bailey reports "...a mostly favorable reception for The Enormous Radio", adding that it "sold a few copies and vanished.", while Patrick Meanor notes that the collection "met with very mixed reviews."

== Critical assessment ==
The stories in The Enormous Radio were clearly an advance over the short fiction issued in Cheever's first collection The Way Some People Live (1943). Biographer Lynne Waldeland writes:

The very fact that the second volume contains only fourteen stories...indicates that the later stories have more fully developed narratives. With few exceptions, the stories in this collection are more complex in technique [and] have a greater range of subject matter and setting.

Biographer Patrick Meanor traces the "dramatic growth" in Cheever's handling of narrative and themes evident in The Enormous Radio and Other Stories to the author's extensive "journal-keeping", much it written while Cheever was in his thirties. Meanor declares that these self-reflective writings "directly influenced" the development of Cheever's fiction:

By the late 1940s, there is evidence that his journals allowed him to exercise his emotional and spiritual faculties more confidently. As a result...the stories in The Enormous Room are longer, more reflective, and psychologically more probing and complex than in his earlier naturalistic stories…His often painful and guilt-laden journals, which show his penchant for self-laceration, ironically worked to refine, deepen, and expand his prose style into one of the most lyrically elegant voices in modern American literature.

"By the time of his second collection, The Enormous Radio and Other Stories, Cheever had laid the groundwork for a repertoire of characters, conflicts, and the themes that recur so regularly that they evolve into a world of their own. The term Cheeveresque is common in critical vocabulary because his world is instantly recognizable." — Biographer Patrick Meanor in John Cheever Revisited (1994)

Meanor notes that a number of stories included in The Enormous Room and Other Stories, among them "Goodbye, My Brother"; "Torch Song" and "The Enormous Radio", would alone have "secured Cheever a permanent place in the pantheon of American short story writers."

Lynne Waldeland cites the same three stories, offering them as evidence for Cheever's emergence as a modern innovator in short fiction.

== Sources ==
- Bailey, Blake. 2009 (1). Notes on Text in John Cheever: Collected Stories and Other Writing. The Library of America. pp. 1025-1028 ISBN 978-1-59853-034-6
- Bailey, Blake. 2009 (2). Cheever: A Life. Alfred A. Knopf, New York. 770 pp. ISBN 978-1-4000-4394-1
- Meanor, Patrick. 1995. John Cheever Revisited. Twayne Publishers, New York. ISBN 0-8057-3999-8
- O'Hara, James E. 1989. John Cheever: A Study of the Short Fiction. Twayne Publishers, Boston Massachusetts. Twayne Studies in Short Fiction no 9. ISBN 0-8057-8310-5
- Waldeland, Lynne. 1979. John Cheever. Twayne Publishers, G. K. Hall & Co., Boston, Massachusetts. ISBN 0-8057-7251-0
