= The Scarlet Moving Van =

- Short story by John Cheever
- Country: United States
- Language: English

Publication
- Published in: The New Yorker
- Publication date: March 21, 1959

"The Scarlet Moving Van" is a short story by John Cheever which first appeared in The New Yorker on March 21, 1959. The work was included in the short fiction collection Some People, Places, and Things That Will Not Appear in My Next Novel (1961), published by Harper and Brothers.

"The Scarlet Moving Van" is included in The Stories of John Cheever (1978).

== Plot ==
Charlie and Martha Folkestone reside in the upscale and socially exclusive suburb of "B___", a small, well-appointed and contented community.

New neighbors arrive in a gilt and scarlet van to move into the house next door. Gee-Gee and Peaches gladly accept an invitation to join the Folkestone's for a drink. The middle-aged Gee-Gee retains some of the Adonis-like looks of his youth, when he was All-American at college. "Gee-Gee" are the initials for "Greek God." Peaches is devoted to him and their two young children. The couples drink freely until midnight, enjoying one another's company. A delightful person when sober, Gee-Gee's demeanor suddenly undergoes a radical change: he begins to berate the Folkestones in a drunken tirade, and proceeds to strip naked in their living room. Peaches recognizes her husband's behavior and is distraught. Gee-Gee tells her "I have to teach them honey— They've got to learn." Charlie orders Gee-Gee out of the house. The long-suffering Peaches explains to the Folkestones that these alcoholic outbursts have been repeated in town after town, forcing the couple to relocate repeatedly.

Days later Charlie encounters Gee-Gee at the local commuter train station, and his neighbor greets him warmly. Gee-Gee has apparently won the goodwill of other residents. Charlie doubts for a moment whether this is the same man who insulted him and Martha in their home.

The new couple are invited to the Waterman's for an elaborate welcoming party. The Folkestone's also attend the affair. In the midst of the banquet, Gee-Gee leaps up on the table and yells "You're all a bunch of stuffed shirts" and proceeds to dance a jig, singing lewd songs. Those in attendance are appalled. When Charlie attempts to discipline him, Gee-Gee wanders off the premises. During the next six weeks Gee-Gee, is forgiven for his offensiveness, securing an invitation to another household and then predictably insulting another host, breaking dishes and hanging from their chandelier naked. His mantra never varies: "They've got to learn…I've got to teach them." The invitations cease.

Charlie confronts Gee-Gee with a quid pro quo: If Gee-Gee stops drinking, so will Charlie, and offers to accompany his friend to consult a psychiatrist. Gee-Gee emphatically declines, declaring only "I have to teach them." Charlie experiences a disturbing insight into the source of Gee-Gee's alcoholism and the significance of his behavior: The man appears to Charlie as a prophet-like figure who suffers for the neglected and most miserable members of society. His mantra is a warning: the most-self absorbed and complacent will in time face the agonies of loss and death. This message troubles Charlie. He and Martha are relieved when their neighbors move to another town.

The following winter, Charlie learns that Gee-Gee has broken a hip playing football, and goes to visit him. Gee-Gee is almost completely immobilized in a cast. Peaches and the children have gone to Nassau at his bidding. Charlie is distressed by Gee-Gee's isolation and apparent helplessness. The convalescent refuses to hire a nurse or obtain a wheelchair. After sharing a drink, Charlie prepares to depart as evening falls and it begins to snow heavily, aware that he is abandoning his friend. He feels pity for the solitary Gee-Gee, but the invalid assures him "I have my guardian angel."

Charlie's drive home at night in the snow is an frightening ordeal. He is relieved to arrive back at the comforts of home and family. The phone rings. It is Gee-Gee, who has fallen down and cannot get up. He pleads with Charlie to come rescue him from his predicament. Charlie is torn between braving the dangerous roads or remaining in the comfort of his home. He ultimately convinces himself that the journey is too risky. A sense that he has abandoned Gee-Gee tortures his conscience. His decision dooms him.

In subsequent days and weeks, Charlie increasingly turns to alcohol to assuage his guilt. He spurns Martha's gentle admonitions to control his drinking. He becomes prone to violent verbal outbursts. He finally loses his job and is forced to relocate, embarking on the same peripatetic existence as Gee-Gee and Peaches.

A postscript to the tale informs the reader that Gee-Gee was rescued just minutes after calling the local fire department.

== Theme ==
The "fabulous" quality of the story is heralded by Cheever's description of the idyllic suburban community of "B__". Critic Lynne Waldeland offers this passage:

Life was unprecedentedly comfortable and tranquil…In nearly every house there was love, graciousness, and high hopes. The schools were excellent, the roads were smooth, the drains and other services were ideal…

Into this Arcadia Cheever introduces the disruptive and disturbing Gee-Gee, a god-like figure. Literary critic Patrick Meanor notes that "Mythic elements abound in "The Scarlet Moving Van" and Cheever invites readers to notice and interpret them." Meanor adds: "It is obvious that Gee-Gee is a combination of Dionysus, Pan...and Silenus, who was never sober and wreaked havoc wherever he appeared.

Critic Samuel Coales notes the biblical prophecies that resonate with Gee-Gee's declaration: "I have to teach them…they've got to learn.":

Clearly, Gee-Gee is the prophet sent to warn suburbia that no matter what elaborate precautions are taken, death and change are always victorious in the end.

The tragic element in "The Scarlet Moving Van" is less that of Gee-Gee's, and more the fate of Charlie Folkestone. The fall from grace that Charlie suffers, from a thoroughly establishment figure into a social outcast begins with his shared alcoholism with Gee-Gee. Meanor writes:

"The gilt and scarlet moving van, that shiny conveyance that 'was an inspired attempt to disguise the sorrowfulness and wandering', suggests both the good and the bad aspects of the suburban mentality. The van itself is beautiful and accommodating, though the color may suggest some demonic aspect of man's fruitless but inevitable quest. At the same time it is a symbol of impermanence and uncertainty. It may finally suggest the perilous existence of all men and the fragile dreams of permanence and comfort upon which the suburban 'faith' is built."—Literary critic Samuel Coale in John Cheever (1977)

…[T]he story documents one of Cheever's most penetrating analyses of the harmful effect of alcohol behavior. It also explores the desperate love that alcoholics can have for one another.

Charlie emerges as an initiate in the arts of social alienation of which Gee-Gee is a practitioner of mythological proportions. Meanor continues:

Gee-Gee admits that he is aware of the destructive nature of his addiction and its predetermined consequences, an admission that so stuns Charlie that he identifies with him and sees Gee-Gee role as a clairvoyant….once Charlie is able to elevate Gee-Gee's drunken, chaotic life to the level of visionary experience, he has sealed his own doom and has, in essence, become Gee-Gee's initiate…he has nowhere to go but down the same destructive path.

Literary critic Tim Lieder argues that the ending is a flip ending that allows the reader to view everything thus far in a different light. Rather than a story about a man who keeps running into his doomed neighbor, it's the story of a man who recognizes his own self-destructive in the messy alcoholic shenanigans of GG. According to Lieder, Charlie is asking GG if he's ever going to stop drinking as an attempt to grab some hope for his soon-to-be-shattered life.

== Sources ==
- Bailey, Blake. 2009. Notes on Text in John Cheever: Collected Stories and Other Writing. The Library of America. Pp. 1025-1028 ISBN 978-1-59853-034-6
- Coale, Samuel. 1977. John Cheever. Frederick Ungar Publishing Company, New York. ISBN 0-8044-6081-7
- Meanor, Patrick. 1995. John Cheever Revisited. Twayne Publishers, New York. ISBN 0-8057-3999-8
- O'Hara, James E. 1989. John Cheever: A Study of the Short Fiction. Twayne Publishers, Boston Massachusetts. Twayne Studies in Short Fiction no 9. ISBN 0-8057-8310-5
- Waldeland, Lynne. 1979. John Cheever. Twayne Publishers, G. K. Hall & Company, Boston, Massachusetts. ISBN 0-8057-7251-0
