= Falconer (novel) =

1977 novel by John Cheever

- First edition cover (Knopf); Cover design by R. D. Scudellari
- Author: John Cheever
- Language: English
- Publisher: Knopf
- Publication date: 1977
- Publication place: United States
- Media type: Print (hardcover and paperback)
- Pages: 211
- ISBN: 0394410718

Falconer is a 1977 novel by American writer John Cheever. It tells the story of Ezekiel Farragut, a university professor and drug addict who is serving time in Falconer State Prison for the murder of his brother. Farragut struggles to retain his humanity in the prison environment, and begins an affair with a fellow prisoner.

== Reception ==
Kirkus Reviews called Cheever's prose "an amazingly flexible instrument" and summarized the novel as "a strong fix—a statement of the human condition, a parable of salvation." Reviewing the book in 1977 for The New York Times, Joan Didion wrote, "On its surface Falconer seems at first to be a conventional novel of crime and punishment and redemption—a story about a man who kills his brother, goes to prison for it and escapes, changed for the better—and yet the 'crime' in this novel bears no more relation to the 'punishment' than the punishment bears to the redemption. The surface here glitters and deceives. Causes and effects run deeper."

Time magazine included the novel in its list of the 100 best novels from 1923 to 2005.

=== Didion-Kazin contretemps ===
Didion’s March 6, 1977 New York Times review of Falconer included remarks disparaging of fellow critic Alfred Kazin’s analysis of Cheever’s short story "The Country Husband" (1954) in his 1973 Bright Book of Life, accusing him of failing to provide an “accurate precis” of the work.

In the NYT Letters section of March 19, 1977, Kazin issued a rebuke, calling Didion’s comments a “wild personal attack” on his powers of literary analysis, an exercise in “self pity and social venom,” and that Didion’s “emotions are much too overloaded for book review.”

According to Kazin, Didion, in a personal communication, responded to his remarks with the laconic retort “Oh, come off it, Alfred.”

== Adaptations ==
In 2009, Audible produced an audio version of Falconer, narrated by Jay Snyder, as part of its Modern Vanguard line of audiobooks.

== In popular culture ==
In the episode "The Cheever Letters" of Seinfeld, it transpires that the father of Susan Ross had a passionate love affair with John Cheever, to the embarrassment of his wife and daughter. At the end of the episode, George is shown reading Falconer (although he erroneously refers to it as The Falconer).

== Sources ==
- New York Times Book Review, 2021. New York Times Book Review: 125 of Literary History. Tina Jordan with Noor Qasim, editors. Clarkson Potter Publishers, New York. Random House. ISBN 978-0-593-23461-7
- Kazin, Alfred. 1977. “LETTERS: New York Times” New York Times Review of Books, March 19, 1977.https://www.nytimes.com/1977/04/10/archives/letters-mindreach.html Accessed 14 August, 2026.
