= The Enormous Radio =

- Short story by John Cheever
- Country: United States
- Language: English

Publication
- Published in: The New Yorker
- Publication date: May 17, 1947

"The Enormous Radio" is a short story by American author John Cheever. It first appeared in the May 17, 1947, issue of The New Yorker, and was subsequently collected in The Enormous Radio and Other Stories., 55 Short Stories from the New Yorker, and The Stories of John Cheever.

"The Enormous Radio" was included in the 1953 Best American Short Stories and later in a volume of Best of the Best series. In Caedmon's 2004 release of The John Cheever Audio Collection, "The Enormous Radio" is read by Meryl Streep.

== Plot ==
Jim and Irene Westcott live contentedly on the 12th floor in an apartment building with their two children near Sutton Place (their city of residence is not mentioned, but Sutton Place is in New York City). They both love to listen to music, regularly attending concerts and spending time listening to music on their radio.

When their radio breaks down, Jim orders a new one, but when it arrives Irene is shocked at its complete and utter ugliness. It is a large gumwood cabinet with numerous dials and switches that illuminate with a green light when it is plugged in. Until the new radio arrived, the Westcotts hardly ever argued and seemed to have a happy marriage.

As Irene listens to music on the radio one evening, she hears interference in the form of a rustling noise over the music. She tries to get the music back by flipping switches and dials, but begins to hear the sounds of people from other apartments in the building. She is so surprised by this that she shuts off the radio. When Jim arrives home, he also tries the radio to get some music, but instead hears elevator noises and doorbells. Believing that the electronics in the building are interfering with the signal he turns the radio off, and determines to call the people who sold it to him and demand to have the radio repaired.

The radio is examined and the problem apparently fixed, but the next day while Irene is listening to a Chopin prelude she hears a man and woman who seem to be arguing. Realizing that the conversation is coming from people who live in a nearby apartment, she flicks a switch, but next hears a woman's voice reading a children's story, which she recognizes as belonging to her neighbors' children's nanny. She flips the switch again, but each time she does so she becomes privy to the events in another apartment. Irene demands that Jim turn off the radio because she is afraid her neighbors will hear her and Jim, just as they can hear the others in the building.

Over the next few days Irene listens in on the lives of her neighbors, and finds herself becoming both intrigued and horrified. She becomes so obsessed with listening in on her neighbors that she cuts short an outing with a friend, to go home and listen to the radio to hear what news would be revealed next from her neighbors. Jim notices how strange Irene has become in her ways and conversations, especially during a dinner party with friends. On the way home, Irene speaks of the stars like a little candle throwing its beam as to "shine a good deed in a naughty world."

Irene becomes totally involved in the lives on the radio and becomes depressed herself. She has gone from a pleasant, rather plain woman, to a woman who doubts who she is and doubts her relationship with her husband Jim. Once more, Jim arranges for the radio to be examined and this time the repairs are successful. The repairs are expensive and a great deal more than Jim can afford. All he wanted was for Irene to get some enjoyment from the radio. Instead the radio brings the Westcotts' peaceful life to an end.

== Critical assessment ==
"The Enormous Radio" represents a significant advance in Cheever's "style, fictive voice, and tone." Biographer Patrick Meanor writes:

"The Enormous Radio" and "Torch Song", much longer, more psychologically sophisticated stories, eventually came to be to be considered two of Cheever's greatest and most popular works, not only for his new, highly developed lyrical style and brilliant character portraiture, but also his ability to evoke deep mythic resonance within the most mundane circumstances.

Biographer John E. O'Hara considered these works 'landmark stories", and "The Enormous Radio" in particular "perhaps the most imaginative story Cheever ever wrote." O'Hara comments on Cheever's skill in exploiting its "thematic possibilities":

The animation of inanimate structures is an ancient literary device, [but] few writers have been able to achieve the intensity of effect that Cheever creates in "The Enormous Radio." Blending realism, fantasy, comedy and pathos, and carefully manipulating these elements into a structure, Cheever illuminates some the darker regions of the human psyche.

O'Hara adds that "The Enormous Radio" "ventured into something approaching existential awareness and raised serious ethical questions about personal involvement and self-delusion in the lives of his characters."

== Theme ==
"The Enormous Radio" is a departure from Cheever's hitherto "naturalistic-realistic narratives" into a whimsical invocation of a fall from grace and the catastrophic consequences of self-knowledge. Biographer Patrick Meanor writes:

"The Enormous Radio" is Cheever's earliest and most brilliant version of the "fall" from innocence into experience, from blissful ignorance into the horror of self-knowledge, and from a comfortable life of illusion into the unbearable reality.

Meanor adds that the radio serves as "an agent of revelation" which, stripping the Westcotts of their self-complacency, leaves them bereft of their "urban Eden", intimately bound up with the idea of the house, gender, and family, which becomes through metaphor, a way of externalizing the inner life of fictional characters.

Writer and Critic Tim Lieder notes that the story is an early experimental story from Cheever and technically magical realism. He also points out that it inspired a Billy Crystal story in Playboy magazine about a man who watches his neighbors on his cable. For Lieder, the most important part of the story was the miserable marriage that is only momentarily interrupted by the chance to eavesdrop on their neighbors. He later noted that this story goes a long way to explaining the state of social media since ultimately the couple's neighbors are rather boring. Social media needs drama to keep people's attention.

== Adaptations ==
=== Television ===
"The Enormous Radio" was adapted into an episode of the television series Tales from the Darkside in 1987 entitled "The Enormous Radio". It was directed by Bill Travis and it aired on May 17, 1987.

=== Radio ===
"The Enormous Radio" was adapted into an episode of the CBS Radio Workshop on May 11, 1956.

The story was dramatized by Gregory Evans on the BBC World Service in the series City Plays, produced and directed by Gordon House. It aired in 1991.

== Sources ==
- Bailey, Blake. 2009 (1). Notes on Text in John Cheever: Collected Stories and Other Writing. The Library of America. pp. 1025-1028 ISBN 978-1-59853-034-6
- Bailey, Blake. 2009 (2). Cheever: A Life. Alfred A. Knopf, New York. 770 pp. ISBN 978-1-4000-4394-1
- Meanor, Patrick. 1995. John Cheever Revisited. Twayne Publishers, New York. ISBN 0-8057-3999-8
- O'Hara, James E. 1989. John Cheever: A Study of the Short Fiction. Twayne Publishers, Boston Massachusetts. Twayne Studies in Short Fiction no 9. ISBN 0-8057-8310-5
- Waldeland, Lynne. 1979. John Cheever. Twayne Publishers, G. K. Hall & Co., Boston, Massachusetts. ISBN 0-8057-7251-0
