= The Music Teacher (short story) =

- Short story by John Cheever
- Country: United States
- Language: English

Publication
- Published in: The New Yorker
- Publication date: November 21, 1959

"The Music Teacher" is a short story by John Cheever which first appeared in The New Yorker on November 21, 1959. The work was included in the short fiction collection The Brigadier and the Golf Widow (1964), published by Harper and Row. The story is one of Cheever's most anthologized works and is regarded as "a genuine masterpiece" of short fiction. "The Music Teacher" is included in The Stories of John Cheever (1978).

== Plot ==
The ten-year marriage of the Setons is slowly but inexorably unraveling. Seton (only his last name is used to identify him), provides a modest income for his wife Jessica and their three young daughters.

Jessica is deeply discontented with her role as homemaker, and expresses it through neglecting to maintain good order and discipline among her children. Whenever Seton arrives home from work, Jessica regularly presents the family with burnt and unpalatable meals, distracted by other domestic responsibilities. Seton is dismayed and deeply troubled. The tender and loving person he had married seems to have vanished. He makes a number of overtures to rekindle their early romance, but his schemes fail. He suspects that Jessica is purposely trying to short-circuit any intimacy with him. The couple has ceased to entertain guests at their home, and are socially isolated.

Seton invites his neighbor, Jack Thompson, to come over for a drink. When Jack arrives with his wife Lucy, he instantly notes the discord in the household. Jessica, laundry basket in hand, declines to join them. Seton accepts Jack's emphatic suggestion that he visit a certain Miss Deming for piano lessons. Miss Deming, Seton is assured, "will help." After procrastinating, the increasingly desperate Seton calls Miss Deming and arranges a lesson. The voice on the telephone is not that of an alluring female, but the harsh voice of a crone. She instructs him to appear at her home the following evening.

After waiting in her anteroom, Seton is ordered to present himself to Miss Deming: she is a short, elderly woman with graying hair. She instructs him to begin executing a scale on the piano. Seton's clumsiness earns him a sharp pencil rap on his knuckles. His ineptitude shames him, but Miss Deming ends the session with the command that he practice a finger drill at home and return next week. He pays the small fee and departs.

At home, Seton practices the exercise diligently, despite the mind-numbing monotony of the melody. The following week Miss Deming insists he continue studying the same drill, despite his mild protests. Seton is aware that the tune is annoying Jessica, but she suffers it without complaining. During an evening walk, Seton passes through his neighborhood, and can hear, or perhaps imagines he hears, the same piano exercise emitting from other houses.

Seton detects a marked change in Jessica's performance as homemaker: she rarely burns the meat in the oven, and serves the meal graciously. She implores Seton to request another tune from his music teacher, as the drill is troubling her. Jessica's manner is not demanding, merely pleading.

At his fifth lesson, Seton is shocked to discover that Miss Deming has guests in her kitchen: a couple of young motorcycle toughs from New York. They are smoking cigarettes and drinking beer. At the piano lesson, she describes the two young men as "her boys. . .they're like sons to me." Miss Deming adds that they sometimes spend the night. Seton conveys Jessica's request to Miss Deming that a new, less repetitive tune be assigned. She sharply informs him that the purpose of the exercise is "to bring her to her knees. . . . Isn't that what you're here for?" Seton is dismayed by this remark, and suspects that he has submitted to a form of witchcraft. The tune is clearly a musical incantation. When he arrives home and announces he will commence practicing the drill, Jessica falls on her knees and begs him not to. Seton finds himself in possession of an obedient and loving wife. He is the benevolent master of his home.

Seton makes a final visit to Miss Deming's home to inform her that he is satisfied, and no longer needs further instruction. The house is deserted, but he senses her presence. Shortly after Seton arrives back home, the police detain him for questioning. They drive him to a crossroads near the railroad tracks. Miss Deming's dead body, her neck broken, is sprawled "like a witch" on the road. Seton informs the police that she was his music teacher, but when asked, he denies that he saw any young men at her house. No longer a suspect, Seton is released.

== Theme ==
"The Music Teacher" is one of Cheever's supreme achievements in its ability to evoke both humor and fear simultaneously and to recreate the myth of Demeter-Hecate, which grounds the story in the haunting power of ancient narrative."—Patrick Meanor in John Cheever Revisited (1995)

The music teacher, Miss Deming, is an explicit rendering of the Greek goddess Hecate, who accompanied souls to Hell, blended with the fertility goddess Demeter. Noting that "the connection to Hecate is unmistakable", literary critic Patrick Meanor writes:

Based on the Greek sorceress Hecate, Miss Deming combines and embodies the darkly magical powers of Hecate with the great fertility goddess, Demeter; identifying Miss Heming with Demeter is key to the story...Hecate is an older version of Demeter and as such, is the goddess as crone.

Cheever is true to the mythological role of Hecate and the domination that she exerted on her male devotees. Meanor continues: "It is evident that Seton's journey is a literal and symbolic descent into darkness that begins in early autumn, move through evenings during the fall, and concludes on the dark night the Miss Deming is murdered. His journey is clearly into Hades, a passage Hecate was in charge of."

Literary critic Lynne Waldeland discerns a duality in the theme of the story, a combination of modern American narratives of the clash between gender roles, and the intervention of supernatural powers, wielded by a witch to impose domestic tranquility:

"The Music Teacher" tied together two motifs: the role of women in middle-class American society and the presence of almost supernatural powers in the world…The story is memorable for its perceptive treatment of a sexual struggle for supremacy within a marriage and the oddly convincing intervention of witchcraft…"

Waldeland adds: "The story is effective except for the final scene of the piano teacher's death, which really doesn't add to our sense of her mysteriousness."

== Sources ==
- Bailey, Blake. 2009. Notes on Text in John Cheever: Collected Stories and Other Writing. The Library of America. Pp.1025-1028 ISBN 978-1-59853-034-6
- Cheever, John. 2009. John Cheever: Collected Stories and Other Writing. The Library of America. ISBN 978-1-59853-034-6
- O'Hara, James E. 1989. John Cheever: A Study of the Short Fiction. Twayne Publishers, Boston Massachusetts. Twayne Studies in Short Fiction no 9. ISBN 0-8057-8310-5
- Meanor, Patrick. 1995. John Cheever Revisited. Twayne Publishers, New York. ISBN 0-8057-3999-8
- Waldeland, Lynne. 1979. John Cheever. Twayne Publishers, G. K. Hall & Company, Boston, Massachusetts. ISBN 0-8057-7251-0
