= The Day the Pig Fell Into the Well (short story) =

- Short story by John Cheever
- Country: United States
- Language: English

Publication
- Published in: The New Yorker
- Publication date: October 23, 1954

"The Day the Pig Fell Into the Well", a short story by John Cheever, was composed in 1949, published in The New Yorker on October 23, 1954, and later collected in The Stories of John Cheever.

== Summary ==
This family story tells of the delights and dilemmas of the Nudds, who spend their summers at Whitebeach Camp in the Adirondacks. The story's title refers to someone asking, each year, if they "remember the day the pig fell into the well," then others "take their familiar parts, like those families who sing Gilbert and Sullivan," and recount events of that day as well as many others. Mr. Nudd and Aunt Martha swim to shore after their boat sinks. The cook Nora gets drunk. A friend sings church songs for an hour, and so on. "It seemed as if the summer were a continent, harmonious and self-sufficient . . . the clean feeling after a long swim."

As the story develops, the events grow darker. Aunt Martha dies. Brother Hartley drowns in the Pacific during The War. Old friendships break down. When the family returns to the camp, Mrs. Nudd asks herself: "What had made the summer always an island . . . such a small island? What mistakes had they made? What had they done wrong? . . . Why should these good and gentle people who surrounded her seem likes the figures in a tragedy?" Cheever ends the story with his usual masterly prose: "It had begun to blow outside, and the house creaked gently, like a hull when the wind takes up the sail. The room with the people in it looked enduring and secure, although in the morning they would all be gone."

== Themes ==
Tim Lieder noted that this is a story about storytelling. Every single character telling the story has a different bias and a different concern. He compares it to The Canterbury Tales since every character tells a story based on their unique personalities; only these characters are telling the same story.
