= The Wapshot Chronicle =

1957 novel by John Cheever

- First edition
- Author: John Cheever
- Language: English
- Publisher: Harper & Brothers
- Publication date: March 25, 1957
- Publication place: United States
- Media type: Print
- Pages: 307

The Wapshot Chronicle is the debut novel by American author John Cheever about an eccentric family that lives in a Massachusetts fishing village. Published in 1957, it won the U.S. National Book Award for Fiction in 1958, and was followed by a sequel, The Wapshot Scandal, published in 1964.

The Wapshot Chronicle is the sometimes-humorous story of Leander Wapshot, his eccentric Cousin Honora, and his sons, Moses and Coverly, as they all deal with life. The story is somewhat autobiographical, particularly regarding the character of Coverly, who, like Cheever, experiences feelings of bisexuality.

The novel was Cheever's first, though he had previously written short stories. It was also the first novel selected for the Book of the Month Club to include the word fuck in the narrative.

In 1998, the Modern Library ranked The Wapshot Chronicle 63rd on its list of the 100 best English-language novels of the 20th century.

== Adaptations ==
In 2009, Audible.com produced an audio version of The Wapshot Chronicle, narrated by Joe Barrett, as part of its Modern Vanguard line of audiobooks.
