= Reunion (short story) =

Short story by John Cheever

"Reunion" is a short story by the American writer John Cheever, first published in the October 27, 1962 issue of The New Yorker, and later collected in The Stories of John Cheever (1978). It is about a boy who meets his father.

== Synopsis ==
Charlie, the narrator, recalls an afternoon meeting as a boy with his father while transferring trains at Grand Central Station in New York City. The boy is innocent and naive and expects his meeting with his father to be an opportunity to reconnect. When he abruptly leaves his father, we assume he now understands why his mother divorced his father, and he also ceases contact with the man. He no longer sees him as a fatherly figure.
