= The Wapshot Scandal =

Novel by John Cheever

First edition (publ. Harper & Row)

The Wapshot Scandal is the second novel by American writer John Cheever. The book followed The Wapshot Chronicle, and was awarded the 1965 William Dean Howells Medal. The scandal of the title involves one of the Wapshot wives running off with a 19-year-old bagboy from the local A&P and making a life with him in Italy.

The book is written in Cheever's signature style, and in part seeks to engage with issues of American civilization coping in a nuclear and automated age.
