= The Stories of John Cheever =

1978 short story collection by John Cheever

- First edition
- Author: John Cheever
- Language: English
- Genre: Short story collection
- Publisher: Alfred A. Knopf
- Publication date: 1978
- Publication place: United States
- Media type: Print (hardback & paperback)
- Pages: 693
- ISBN: 0-394-50087-3

The Stories of John Cheever is a 1978 short story collection by American author John Cheever. It contains some of his most famous stories, including "The Enormous Radio", "Goodbye, My Brother", "The Country Husband", "The Five-Forty-Eight" and "The Swimmer". It won the Pulitzer Prize for Fiction and the National Book Critics Circle Award in 1979 and its first paperback edition won a 1981 National Book Award. (Note: Cheever's Stories won the 1981 award for paperback fiction. From 1980 to 1983 in National Book Awards history, there were dual hardcover and paperback awards in most categories. Most of the paperback award-winners were reprints, including this one.)

== Stories ==
- "Goodbye, My Brother"
- "The Common Day"
- "The Enormous Radio"
- "O City of Broken Dreams"
- "The Hartleys"
- "The Sutton Place Story"
- "The Summer Farmer"
- "Torch Song"
- "The Pot of Gold"
- "Clancy in the Tower of Babel"
- "Christmas is a Sad Season for the Poor"
- "The Season of Divorce"
- "The Chaste Clarissa"
- "The Cure"
- "The Superintendent"
- "The Children"
- "The Sorrows of Gin"
- "O Youth and Beauty!"
- "The Day the Pig Fell Into the Well"
- "The Five-Forty-Eight"
- "Just One More Time"
- "The Housebreaker of Shady Hill"
- "The Bus to St. James's"
- "The Worm in the Apple"
- "The Trouble of Marcie Flint"
- "The Bella Lingua"
- "The Wrysons"
- "The Country Husband"
- "The Duchess"
- "The Scarlet Moving Van"
- "Just Tell Me Who It Was"
- "Brimmer"
- "The Golden Age"
- "The Lowboy"
- "The Music Teacher"
- "A Woman Without a Country"
- "The Death of Justina"
- "Clementina"
- "Boy in Rome"
- "A Miscellany of Characters That Will Not Appear"
- "The Chimera"
- "The Seaside Houses"
- "The Angel of the Bridge"
- "The Brigadier and the Golf Widow"
- "A Vision of the World"
- "Reunion"
- "An Educated American Woman"
- "Metamorphoses"
- "Mene, Mene, Tekel, Upharsin"
- "Montraldo"
- "The Ocean"
- "Marito in Città"
- "The Geometry of Love"
- "The Swimmer"
- "The World of Apples"
- "Another Story"
- "Percy"
- "The Fourth Alarm"
- "Artemis, the Honest Well Digger"
- "Three Stories"
- "The Jewels of the Cabots"

== The John Cheever Audio Collection ==
The John Cheever Audio Collection
- Author: John Cheever
- Audio read by: John Cheever, Benjamin Cheever, Meryl Streep, Edward Herrmann, Blythe Danner, George Plimpton, and Peter Gallagher
- Language: English
- Genre: Short story collection
- Publisher: Caedmon
- Publication date: 2004
- Publication place: United States
- Media type: Compact Disc, Digital Audio, MP3

In 2004, Caedmon released a recorded compilation of selected stories from The Stories of John Cheever, each read either by Cheever, George Plimpton, or a professional actor. Benjamin Cheever reads the introduction written by his father, and the full track list of stories is as follows:

- "The Enormous Radio" read by Meryl Streep
- "The Five-Forty-Eight" read by Edward Herrmann
- "O City of Broken Dreams" read by Blythe Danner
- "Christmas is a Sad Season for the Poor" read by George Plimpton
- "The Season of Divorce" read by Edward Herrmann
- "The Brigadier and the Golf Widow" read by Peter Gallagher
- "The Sorrows of Gin" read by Meryl Streep
- "O Youth and Beauty!" read by Peter Gallagher
- "The Chaste Clarissa" read by Blythe Danner
- "The Jewels of the Cabots" read by George Plimpton
- "The Death of Justina" read by John Cheever
- "The Swimmer" read by John Cheever

Reception to the collection was positive. Publishers Weekly called the readers a "first-class lineup of narrators" and stated that "Cheever's archived readings that steal the show. His performance of "The Swimmer," in particular, boldly displays his contempt for the country-club set, while still evoking readers' sympathy for the hapless main character. The inclusion of [his] readings makes for a deeply personal, resonant finale to a truly superb production."
