= John Cheever =

American novelist and short story writer (1912–1982)

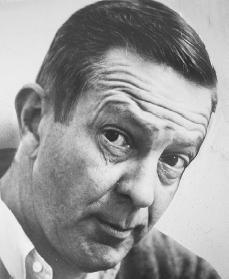
- Born: John William Cheever; May 27, 1912; Quincy, Massachusetts, U.S.
- Died: June 18, 1982 (aged 70); Ossining, New York, U.S.
- Occupations: Writer; novelist
- Spouse: Mary Winternitz (m. 1941)
- Children: Susan; Benjamin; Federico
- Writing career
- Years active: 1935–1982
- Period: 20th century
- Genres: Short story, fiction
- Notable works: "The Enormous Radio"; "The Five-Forty-Eight"; The Wapshot Chronicle; "The Swimmer"; The Wapshot Scandal; Bullet Park; Falconer; Oh What a Paradise It Seems
- Notable awards: Pulitzer Prize (1979); National Book Critics Circle Award (1981)
- Movement: Symbolism

John William Cheever (May 27, 1912 – June 18, 1982) was an American short story writer and novelist. He is sometimes called "the Chekhov of the suburbs". His fiction is mostly set on the Upper East Side of Manhattan; the Westchester suburbs; old New England villages based on various South Shore towns around Quincy, Massachusetts, where he was born; and Italy, especially Rome. His short stories included "The Enormous Radio", "Goodbye, My Brother", "The Five-Forty-Eight", "The Country Husband", and "The Swimmer", and he also wrote five novels: The Wapshot Chronicle (National Book Award, 1958), The Wapshot Scandal (William Dean Howells Medal, 1965), Bullet Park (1969), Falconer (1977) and a novella, Oh What a Paradise It Seems (1982).

His main themes include the duality of human nature: sometimes dramatized as the disparity between a character's decorous social persona and inner corruption, and sometimes as a conflict between two characters (often brothers) who embody the salient aspects of both—light and dark, flesh and spirit. Many of his works also express a nostalgia for a vanishing way of life (as evoked by the mythical St. Botolphs in the Wapshot novels), characterized by abiding cultural traditions and a profound sense of community, as opposed to the alienating nomadism of modern suburbia.

A compilation of his short stories, The Stories of John Cheever, won the 1979 Pulitzer Prize for Fiction and a National Book Critics Circle Award, and its first paperback edition won a 1981 National Book Award. (Note: Cheever's Stories won the 1981 award for paperback Fiction. From 1980 to 1983 in National Book Awards history there were dual hardcover and paperback awards in most categories. Most of the paperback award-winners were reprints, including this one.)

On April 27, 1982, six weeks before his death, Cheever was awarded the National Medal for Literature by the American Academy of Arts and Letters. His work has been included in the Library of America.

== Early life and education ==
John William Cheever was born in Quincy, Massachusetts, the second child of Frederick Lincoln Cheever and Mary Liley Cheever. His father was a prosperous shoe salesman, and Cheever spent much of his childhood in a large Victorian house, at 123 Winthrop Avenue, in the then-genteel suburb of Wollaston, Massachusetts. In the mid-1920s, however, as the New England shoe and textile industries began their long decline, Frederick Cheever lost most of his money and began to drink heavily. To pay the bills, Mary Cheever opened a gift shop in downtown Quincy—an "abysmal humiliation" for the family, as John saw it. In 1926, Cheever began attending Thayer Academy, a private day school, but he found the atmosphere stifling and performed poorly, and finally transferred to Quincy High in 1928. A year later, he won a short story contest sponsored by the Boston Herald and was invited back to Thayer as a "special student" on academic probation. His grades continued to be poor, however, and, in March 1930, he was either expelled for smoking or (more likely) departed of his own accord when the headmaster delivered an ultimatum to the effect that he must either apply himself or leave. The 18-year-old Cheever wrote a sardonic account of this experience, titled "Expelled", which was subsequently published in The New Republic.

Around this time, Cheever's older brother, Fred, forced to withdraw from Dartmouth in 1926 because of the family's financial crisis, re-entered Cheever's life "when the situation was most painful and critical", as Cheever later wrote. After the 1932 crash of Kreuger & Toll, in which Frederick Cheever had invested what was left of his money, the Cheever house on Winthrop Avenue was lost to foreclosure. The parents separated, while John and Fred took an apartment together on Beacon Hill, in Boston. In 1933, John wrote to Elizabeth Ames, the director of the Yaddo artist's colony in Saratoga Springs, New York: "The idea of leaving the city", he said, "has never been so distant or desirable." Ames denied his first application but offered him a place the following year, whereupon Cheever decided to sever his "ungainly attachment" to his brother. Cheever spent the summer of 1934 at Yaddo, which would serve as a second home for much of his life.

== Career ==
=== Early writings ===
For the next few years, Cheever divided his time between Manhattan, Saratoga, Lake George (where he was caretaker of the Yaddo-owned Triuna Island), and Quincy, where he continued to visit his parents, who had reconciled and moved to an apartment at 60 Spear Street. Cheever drove from one place to another in a dilapidated Model A roadster, but had no permanent address. In 1935, Katharine White of The New Yorker bought Cheever's story "Buffalo" for $45—the first of many that Cheever would publish in the magazine. Maxim Lieber became his literary agent, 1935–1941. In 1938, he began work for the Federal Writers' Project in Washington, D.C., which he considered an embarrassing boondoggle. As an editor for the WPA Guide to New York City, Cheever was charged with (as he put it) "twisting into order the sentences written by some incredibly lazy bastards." He quit after less than a year and a few months later he met his future wife, Mary Winternitz, seven years his junior. She was a daughter of Milton Winternitz, dean of Yale Medical School, and granddaughter of Thomas A. Watson, an assistant to Alexander Graham Bell during the invention of the telephone. They married in 1941.

Cheever enlisted as an infantryman in the U.S. Army on May 7, 1942. He was later reassigned to the Signal Corps. His first collection of short stories, The Way Some People Live, was published in 1943 to mixed reviews. Cheever himself came to despise the book as "embarrassingly immature", and for the rest of his life destroyed every copy he could lay his hands on. However, the book may have saved his life after falling into the hands of Major Leonard Spigelgass, an MGM executive and officer in the Signal Corps, who was struck by Cheever's "childlike sense of wonder." Early that summer, Cheever was transferred to the former Paramount studio in Astoria, Queens, New York City, where he commuted via subway from his apartment in Chelsea, Manhattan, New York City. Meanwhile, most of his old infantry company was killed on a Normandy beach during the D-Day invasion. Cheever's daughter Susan was born on July 31, 1943.

After the war, Cheever and his family moved to an apartment building at 400 East 59th Street, near Sutton Place, Manhattan; almost every morning for the next five years, he would dress in his only suit and take the elevator to a maid's room in the basement, where he stripped to his boxer shorts and wrote until lunchtime. In 1946, he accepted a $4,800 advance from Random House to resume work on his novel, The Holly Tree, which he had discontinued during the war. "The Enormous Radio" appeared in the May 17, 1947 issue of The New Yorker—a Kafkaesque tale about a sinister radio that broadcasts the private conversations of tenants in a New York apartment building. A startling advance on Cheever's early, more naturalistic work, the story elicited a fan letter from the magazine's irascible editor, Harold Ross: "It will turn out to be a memorable one, or I am a fish." Cheever's son Benjamin was born on May 4, 1948.

=== Mid-career ===
Cheever's work became longer and more complex, apparently a protest against the "slice of life" fiction typical of The New Yorker in those years. An early draft of "The Day the Pig Fell into the Well"—a long story with elaborate Chekhovian nuances, meant to "operate something like a rondo", as Cheever wrote to his friend and New Yorker editor William Maxwell—was completed in 1949, though the magazine did not make space for it until five years later. In 1951, Cheever wrote "Goodbye, My Brother", after a gloomy summer in Martha's Vineyard. Largely on the strength of these two stories (still in manuscript at the time), Cheever was awarded a Guggenheim Fellowship. On May 28, 1951, Cheever moved to Beechwood, the suburban estate of Frank A. Vanderlip, a banker, in the Westchester hamlet of Scarborough-on-Hudson, where he rented a small cottage on the edge of the estate. The house, coincidentally, had been occupied before the Cheevers by another suburban chronicler, Richard Yates. In Scarborough, he was a casual volunteer for the Briarcliff Manor Fire Department.

Cheever's second collection, The Enormous Radio, was published in 1953. Reviews were mostly positive, though Cheever's reputation continued to suffer because of his close association with The New Yorker (considered middlebrow by such influential critics as Dwight Macdonald), and he was particularly pained by the general preference for J. D. Salinger's Nine Stories, published around the same time. Meanwhile, Random House demanded that Cheever either produce a publishable novel or pay back his advance, whereupon Cheever wrote Mike Bessie at Harper & Brothers ("These old bones are up for sale"), who bought him out of his Random House contract. In the summer of 1956, Cheever finished The Wapshot Chronicle while vacationing in Friendship, Maine, and received a congratulatory telegram from William Maxwell: "WELL ROARED LION". With the proceeds from the sale of film rights to "The Housebreaker of Shady Hill", Cheever and his family spent the following year in Italy, where his son Federico was born on March 9, 1957 ("We wanted to call him Frederick", Cheever wrote, "but there is of course no K in the alphabet here and I gave up after an hour or two").

The Wapshot Scandal was published in 1964, and received perhaps the best reviews of Cheever's career up to that point (amid quibbles about the novel's episodic structure). Cheever appeared on the cover of Time magazine's March 27 issue, this for an appreciative profile, "Ovid in Ossining". (In 1961, Cheever had moved to a stately, stone-ended Dutch Colonial farmhouse in Ossining, on the east bank of the Hudson.) "The Swimmer" appeared in the July 18, 1964, issue of The New Yorker. Cheever noted with chagrin that the story (one of his best) appeared toward the back of the issue—behind a John Updike story—since, as it happened, Maxwell and other editors at the magazine were a little bewildered by its non-New Yorkerish surrealism. In the summer of 1966, a screen adaptation of "The Swimmer", starring Burt Lancaster, was filmed in Westport, Connecticut. Cheever was a frequent visitor on the set, and made a cameo appearance in the movie.

By then Cheever's alcoholism had become severe, exacerbated by torment concerning his bisexuality. Still, he blamed most of his marital woes on his wife, and in 1966 he consulted a psychiatrist, David C. Hays, about her hostility and "needless darkness". After a session with Mary Cheever, the psychiatrist asked to see the couple jointly; Cheever, heartened, believed his wife's difficult behavior would finally be addressed. At the joint session, however, Hays said (as Cheever noted in his journal) that Cheever himself was the problem: "a neurotic man, narcissistic, egocentric, friendless, and so deeply involved in [his] own defensive illusions that [he has] invented a manic-depressive wife." Cheever soon terminated therapy.

=== Later life and career ===
Bullet Park was published in 1969, and received a devastating review from Benjamin DeMott on the front page of The New York Times Book Review: "John Cheever's short stories are and will remain lovely birds... But in the gluey atmosphere of Bullet Park no birds sing." Cheever's alcoholic depression deepened, and in May he resumed psychiatric treatment (which again proved fruitless). He began an affair with actress Hope Lange in the late 1960s.

On May 12, 1973, Cheever awoke coughing uncontrollably and learned at the hospital that he had almost died from pulmonary edema caused by alcoholism. After a month in the hospital, he returned home vowing never to drink again; however, he resumed drinking in August. Despite his precarious health, he spent the fall semester teaching (and drinking, both with fellow writer-teacher, Raymond Carver) at the Iowa Writers' Workshop, where his students included T. C. Boyle, Allan Gurganus, and Ron Hansen. As his marriage continued to deteriorate, Cheever accepted a professorship at Boston University the following year and moved into a fourth-floor walkup apartment at 71 Bay State Road. Cheever's drinking soon became suicidal and, in March 1975, his brother Fred, now virtually indigent, but sober after his own lifelong bout with alcoholism, drove John back to Ossining. On April 9, Cheever was admitted to the Smithers Alcoholic Rehabilitation Unit in New York, where he shared a bedroom and bath with four other men. Driven home by his wife on May 7, Cheever never drank alcohol again.

In March 1977, Cheever appeared on the cover of Newsweek with the caption, "A Great American Novel: John Cheever's Falconer." The novel was No. 1 on the New York Times Best Seller list for three weeks. The Stories of John Cheever appeared in October 1978, and became one of the most successful collections ever, selling 125,000 copies in hardback and winning universal acclaim.

Cheever was awarded the Edward MacDowell Medal for outstanding contribution to the arts by the MacDowell Colony in 1979.

== Personal life ==
Cheever's marriage was damaged by his unfaithfulness. He had relationships with both men and women, including a short relationship with composer Ned Rorem and an affair with actress Hope Lange. Cheever's longest affair was with a student of his, Max Zimmer, who lived in the Cheever family home. Cheever's daughter, Susan, described her parents' marriage as "European", saying: "they were people who felt their feelings weren't necessarily a reason to shatter a family. They certainly hurt each other plenty but they didn't necessarily see that as a reason for divorce."

== Illness and death ==
In the summer of 1981, a tumor was discovered in Cheever's right lung, and, in late November, he returned to the hospital and learned that the cancer had spread to his femur, pelvis, and bladder. His last novel, Oh What a Paradise It Seems, was published in March 1982. On April 27, he received the National Medal for Literature at Carnegie Hall, where colleagues were shocked by his ravaged appearance after months of cancer therapy. "A page of good prose", he declared in his remarks, "remains invincible." John Updike wrote that "All the literary acolytes assembled there fell quite silent, astonished by such faith."

When Cheever died on June 18, 1982, flags in Ossining were lowered to half staff for ten days. He is buried at First Parish Cemetery, Norwell, Massachusetts.

=== Posthumous ===
In 1987, Cheever's widow, Mary, signed a contract with a small publisher, Academy Chicago Publishers, for the right to publish Cheever's uncollected short stories. The contract led to a long legal battle, eventually resulting in Thirteen Uncollected Stories by John Cheever, published in 1994 by Academy Chicago.

Two of Cheever's children, Susan and Benjamin, became writers. Susan's memoir, Home Before Dark (1984), revealed Cheever's sexual relationships with both women and men, which was confirmed by his posthumously published letters and journals. This was parodied to comedic effect in a 1992 episode of the TV sitcom Seinfeld, when the character Susan discovers explicit love letters from Cheever to her father. In 2025, Susan published When All the Men Wore Hats: Susan Cheever on the Stories of John Cheever, examining the connections between her father's stories and his life.

After Blake Bailey published his biography of Richard Yates, A Tragic Honesty (2003), Cheever's son Ben suggested Bailey write an authoritative biography of Cheever. It was published by Knopf on March 10, 2009, and won that year's National Book Critics Circle Award in Biography and the Francis Parkman Prize, and was a finalist for the Pulitzer and James Tait Black Memorial Prize.

Also in 2009, Cheever was featured in Soul of a People: Writing America's Story, a 90-minute documentary about the WPA Writers' Project. His life during the 1930s is also highlighted in the companion book, Soul of a People: The WPA Writers' Project Uncovers Depression America.

In 2024, Cheever was portrayed by actor Gary Oldman in the movie Parthenope.

== Works ==
=== Novels ===
- The Wapshot Chronicle (1957)
- The Wapshot Scandal (1964)
- Bullet Park (1969)
- Falconer (1977)
- Oh What a Paradise It Seems (1982)

=== Short story collections ===
- The Way Some People Live (1943)
- The Enormous Radio and Other Stories (1953)
- The Housebreaker of Shady Hill and Other Stories (1958)
- Some People, Places, and Things That Will Not Appear in My Next Novel (1961)
- The Brigadier and the Golf Widow (1964)
- The World of Apples (1973)
- The Stories of John Cheever (1978)
- Thirteen Uncollected Stories by John Cheever (1994)
- A Vision of the World: Selected Short Stories (2021)

=== Collections ===
- The Letters of John Cheever, edited by Benjamin Cheever (1988)
- The Journals of John Cheever (1991)
- Collected Stories & Other Writings (Library of America) (stories, 2009)
- Complete Novels (Library of America) (novels, 2009)

=== Short stories ===
Title	Publication	Collected in
"Expelled"	The New Republic (October 1, 1930)	Collected Stories and Other Writings
"Bock Beer and Bermuda Onions"	Hound & Horn (April–June 1931)	Thirteen Uncollected Stories by John Cheever
"Fall River"	The Left (Autumn 1931)	Thirteen Uncollected Stories by John Cheever
"Late Gathering"	Pagany (October–December 1931)	Thirteen Uncollected Stories by John Cheever
"Brooklyn Rooming House"	The New Yorker (March 25, 1935)	-
"Buffalo"	The New Yorker (June 22, 1935)	-
"The Autobiography of a Drummer"	The New Republic (October 23, 1935)	Thirteen Uncollected Stories by John Cheever
"Of Love: A Testimony"	Story (December 1935)	The Way Some People Live
"In Passing"	The Atlantic (March 1936)	Thirteen Uncollected Stories by John Cheever
"Bayonne"	Parade (Spring 1936)	Thirteen Uncollected Stories by John Cheever
"Play a March"	The New Yorker (June 20, 1936)	Collected Stories and Other Writings
"The Princess"	The New Republic (October 28, 1936)	Thirteen Uncollected Stories by John Cheever
"A Picture for the Home"	The New Yorker (November 28, 1936)	-
"Behold a Cloud in the West"	New Letters in America, no. 1 (1937)	-
"The Brothers"	The Yale Review (June 1937)	The Way Some People Live
"Summer Remembered"	Story (June 1937)	The Way Some People Live
"The Teaser"	The New Republic (September 8, 1937)	Thirteen Uncollected Stories by John Cheever
"Homage to Shakespeare"	Story (November 1937)	Homage to Shakespeare (1968)
"In the Beginning"	The New Yorker (November 6, 1937)	-
"Frère Jacques"	The Atlantic (1938)	-
"His Young Wife"	Collier's (January 1, 1938)	Thirteen Uncollected Stories by John Cheever
"Saratoga"	Collier's (October 13, 1938)	Thirteen Uncollected Stories by John Cheever
"Treat"	The New Yorker (January 21, 1939)	-
"The Happiest Days"	The New Yorker (November 4, 1939)	-
"It's Hot in Egypt"	The New Yorker (January 6, 1940)	-
"I'm Going to Asia"	Harper's Bazaar (February 1940)	-
"North of Portland"	The New Yorker (February 24, 1940)	The Way Some People Live
"Survivor"	The New Yorker (March 9, 1940)	The Way Some People Live
"Washington Boarding House"	The New Yorker (March 23, 1940)	The Way Some People Live
"Riding Stable"	The New Yorker (April 27, 1940)	The Way Some People Live
"The Edge of the World"	Harper's Bazaar (June 1940)	The Way Some People Live
"Happy Birthday, Enid"	The New Yorker (July 13, 1940)	The Way Some People Live
"Tomorrow Is a Beautiful Day"	The New Yorker (August 3, 1940)	The Way Some People Live
"The Man She Loved"	Collier's (August 24, 1940)	Thirteen Uncollected Stories by John Cheever
"Summer Theatre"	The New Yorker (August 24, 1940)	The Way Some People Live
"The New World"	The New Yorker (November 9, 1940)	The Way Some People Live
"Forever Hold Your Peace"	The New Yorker (November 23, 1940)	The Way Some People Live
"A Present for Louisa"	Mademoiselle (December 1940)	-
"When Grandmother Goes"	The New Yorker (December 14, 1940)	The Way Some People Live
"Cat"	Harper's Bazaar (January 1941)	The Way Some People Live
"A Bird in the Hand"	Mademoiselle (February 1941)	-
"Hello, Dear"	The New Yorker (February 15, 1941)	The Way Some People Live
"The Law of the Jungle"	The New Yorker (March 22, 1941)	The Way Some People Live
"A Border Incident"	Harper's Bazaar (July 1941)	The Way Some People Live
"There They Go"	The New Yorker (July 19, 1941)	The Way Some People Live
"Run, Sheep, Run"	The New Yorker (August 2, 1941)	The Way Some People Live
"Publick House"	The New Yorker (August 16, 1941)	The Way Some People Live
"These Tragic Years"	The New Yorker (September 27, 1941)	The Way Some People Live
"From This Day Forward"	Mademoiselle (October 1941)	-
"In the Eyes of God"	The New Yorker (October 11, 1941)	The Way Some People Live
"The Pleasures of Solitude"	The New Yorker (January 24, 1942)	The Way Some People Live
"The Pursuit of Happiness"	Mademoiselle (February 1942)	-
"A Place of Great Historical Interest"	The New Yorker (February 21, 1942)	-
"The Peril in the Streets"	The New Yorker (March 21, 1942)	The Way Some People Live
"The Shape of a Night"	The New Yorker (April 18, 1942)	The Way Some People Live
"Goodbye Broadway—Hello, Hello"	The New Yorker (June 6, 1942)	The Way Some People Live
"Family Dinner"	Collier's (July 25, 1942)	Thirteen Uncollected Stories by John Cheever
"Problem No. 4"	The New Yorker (October 17, 1942)	The Way Some People Live
"The Man Who Was Very Homesick for New York"	The New Yorker (November 21, 1942)	The Way Some People Live
"The Sorcerer's Balm" aka "You Will Lose Her"	Read (January 1943)	The Way Some People Live
"Sergeant Limeburner"	The New Yorker (March 13, 1943)	-
"They Shall Inherit the Earth"	The New Yorker (April 10, 1943)	-
"A Tale of Old Pennsylvania"	The New Yorker (May 29, 1943)	-
"The Invisible Ship"	The New Yorker (August 7, 1943)	-
"My Friends and Neighbors All, Farewell"	The New Yorker (September 24, 1943)	-
"Dear Lord, We Thank Thee for Thy Bounty"	The New Yorker (November 27, 1943)	-
"Somebody Has to Die"	The New Yorker (June 24, 1944)	-
"A Walk in the Park"	Good Housekeeping (October 1944)	-
"The Single Purpose of Leon Burrows"	The New Yorker (October 7, 1944)	-
"The Mouth of the Turtle"	The New Yorker (November 11, 1944)	-
"Town House"	The New Yorker; I: April 18, 1945; II: August 11, 1945; III: November 10, 1945; IV: January 5, 1946; V: March 16, 1946; VI: May 4, 1946	-
"Manila"	The New Yorker (July 28, 1945)	-
"The Sutton Place Story"	The New Yorker (June 29, 1946)	The Enormous Radio and Other Stories
"Love in the Islands"	The New Yorker (December 7, 1946)	-
"The Beautiful Mountains"	The New Yorker (February 8, 1947)	-
"The Enormous Radio"	The New Yorker (May 17, 1947)	The Enormous Radio and Other Stories
"The Common Day"	The New Yorker (August 2, 1947)	The Stories of John Cheever
"Roseheath"	The New Yorker (August 16, 1947)	Collected Stories and Other Writings
"Torch Song"	The New Yorker (October 4, 1947)	The Enormous Radio and Other Stories
"O City of Broken Dreams"	The New Yorker (January 24, 1948)	The Enormous Radio and Other Stories
"Keep the Ball Rolling"	The New Yorker (May 29, 1948)	-
"The Summer Farmer"	The New Yorker (August 7, 1948)	The Enormous Radio and Other Stories
"The Hartleys"	The New Yorker (January 22, 1949)	The Enormous Radio and Other Stories
"The Temptations of Emma Boynton"	The New Yorker (November 26, 1949)	-
"Vega"	Harper's Magazine (December 1949)	-
"The Opportunity"	Cosmopolitan (December 1949)	Thirteen Uncollected Stories by John Cheever
"Christmas Is a Sad Season for the Poor"	The New Yorker (December 24, 1949)	The Enormous Radio and Other Stories
"The Season of Divorce"	The New Yorker (March 4, 1950)	The Enormous Radio and Other Stories
"The Pot of Gold"	The New Yorker (October 14, 1950)	The Enormous Radio and Other Stories
"The Reasonable Music"	Harper's Magazine (November 1950)	-
"The People You Meet"	The New Yorker (December 2, 1950)	-
"Clancy in the Tower of Babel"	The New Yorker (March 24, 1951)	The Enormous Radio and Other Stories
"Goodbye, My Brother"	The New Yorker (August 25, 1951)	The Enormous Radio and Other Stories
"The Children"	The New Yorker (March 6, 1952)	The Enormous Radio and Other Stories
"The Superintendent"	The New Yorker (March 29, 1952)	The Enormous Radio and Other Stories
"The Chaste Clarissa"	The New Yorker (June 14, 1952)	The Brigadier and the Golf Widow
"The Cure"	The New Yorker (July 3, 1952)	The Enormous Radio and Other Stories
"O Youth and Beauty!"	The New Yorker (August 22, 1953)	The Housebreaker of Shady Hill and Other Stories
"The National Pastime"	The New Yorker (September 26, 1953)	Stories (1956) by Jean Stafford, John Cheever, Daniel Fuchs & William Maxwell; Collected Stories and Other Writings
"The Sorrows of Gin"	The New Yorker (December 12, 1953)	The Housebreaker of Shady Hill and Other Stories
"The True Confessions of Henry Pell"	Harper's Magazine (June 1954)	-
"Independence Day at St. Botolph's"*	The New Yorker (July 3, 1954)	* Excerpt from The Wapshot Chronicle
"The Five-Forty-Eight"	The New Yorker (August 10, 1954)	The Housebreaker of Shady Hill and Other Stories
"The Day the Pig Fell Into the Well"	The New Yorker (October 23, 1954)	Stories (1956); The Stories of John Cheever
"The Country Husband"	The New Yorker (November 20, 1954)	Stories (1956); The Housebreaker of Shady Hill and Other Stories
"Just Tell Me Who It Was"	The New Yorker (April 16, 1955)	The Housebreaker of Shady Hill and Other Stories
"Just One More Time"	The New Yorker (October 8, 1955)	The Brigadier and the Golf Widow
"The Journal of a Writer With a Hole in One Sock"	The Reporter (December 29, 1955)	-
"The Bus to St. James's"	The New Yorker (January 14, 1956)	Stories (1956); The Stories of John Cheever
"The Journal of an Old Gent"*	The New Yorker (February 18, 1956)	* Excerpt from The Wapshot Chronicle
"The Housebreaker of Shady Hill"	The New Yorker (April 4, 1956)	The Housebreaker of Shady Hill and Other Stories
"How Dr. Wareham Kept His Servants"	The Reporter (April 5, 1956)	-
"Miss Wapshot"*	The New Yorker (September 22, 1956)	* Excerpt from The Wapshot Chronicle
"The Clear Haven"*	The New Yorker (December 1, 1956)	* Excerpt from The Wapshot Chronicle
"The Trouble of Marcie Flint"	The New Yorker (November 9, 1957)	The Housebreaker of Shady Hill and Other Stories
"The Worm in the Apple"	The Housebreaker of Shady Hill and Other Stories (1958)	The Housebreaker of Shady Hill and Other Stories
"The Bella Lingua"	The New Yorker (March 1, 1958)	The Brigadier and the Golf Widow
"Paola"	The New Yorker (July 26, 1958)	-
"The Wrysons"	The New Yorker (September 15, 1958)	Some People, Places, and Things That Will Not Appear in My Next Novel
"The Duchess"	The New Yorker (December 13, 1958)	Some People, Places, and Things That Will Not Appear in My Next Novel
"The Scarlet Moving Van"	The New Yorker (March 21, 1959)	Some People, Places, and Things That Will Not Appear in My Next Novel
"The Events of That Easter"	The New Yorker (May 16, 1959)	-
"Brimmer"	Esquire (August 1959)	Some People, Places, and Things That Will Not Appear in My Next Novel
"The Golden Age"	The New Yorker (September 26, 1959)	Some People, Places, and Things That Will Not Appear in My Next Novel
"The Lowboy"	The New Yorker (October 10, 1959)	Some People, Places, and Things That Will Not Appear in My Next Novel
"The Music Teacher"	The New Yorker (November 21, 1959)	The Brigadier and the Golf Widow
"A Woman Without a Country"	The New Yorker (December 12, 1959)	The Brigadier and the Golf Widow
"Boy in Rome"	Esquire (February 1960)	Some People, Places, and Things That Will Not Appear in My Next Novel
"Clementina"	The New Yorker (May 7, 1960)	The Brigadier and the Golf Widow
"The Death of Justina"	Esquire (November 1960)	Some People, Places, and Things That Will Not Appear in My Next Novel
"A Miscellany of Characters That Will Not Appear"	The New Yorker (November 12, 1960)	Some People, Places, and Things That Will Not Appear in My Next Novel
"The Chimera"	The New Yorker (July 4, 1961)	The World of Apples
"The Seaside Houses"	The New Yorker (July 29, 1961)	The Brigadier and the Golf Widow
"The Angel of the Bridge"	The New Yorker (October 21, 1961)	The Brigadier and the Golf Widow
"The Brigadier and the Golf Widow"	The New Yorker (November 11, 1961)	The Brigadier and the Golf Widow
"The Traveller"*	The New Yorker (December 9, 1961)	* Excerpt from The Wapshot Scandal
"Christmas Eve at St. Botolph's"*	The New Yorker (December 23, 1961)	* Excerpt from The Wapshot Scandal
"Reunion"	The New Yorker (October 27, 1962)	The Brigadier and the Golf Widow
"The Embarkment for Cythera"	The New Yorker (November 3, 1962)	* Excerpt from The Wapshot Scandal
"A Vision of the World"	The New Yorker (November 29, 1962)	The Brigadier and the Golf Widow
"Metamorphoses"	The New Yorker (March 2, 1963)	The Brigadier and the Golf Widow
"The International Wilderness"*	The New Yorker (April 6, 1963)	* Excerpt from The Wapshot Scandal
"Mene, Mene, Tekel, Upharsin"	The New Yorker (April 27, 1963)	The World of Apples
"The Wapshot Scandal"*	Esquire (July 1963)	* Excerpt from The Wapshot Scandal
"An Educated American Woman"	The New Yorker (November 2, 1963)	The Brigadier and the Golf Widow
"The Habit"	The New Yorker (March 7, 1964)	-
"Montraldo"	The New Yorker (June 6, 1964)	The World of Apples
"Marito in Città"	The New Yorker (July 4, 1964)	The Brigadier and the Golf Widow
"The Swimmer"	The New Yorker (July 18, 1964)	The Brigadier and the Golf Widow
"The Ocean"	The New Yorker (August 1, 1964)	The Brigadier and the Golf Widow
"The Geometry of Love"	The Saturday Evening Post (January 1, 1966)	The World of Apples
"The World of Apples"	Esquire (December 1966)	The World of Apples
"Another Story"	The New Yorker (February 25, 1967)	The Stories of John Cheever
"Bullet Park"*	The New Yorker (November 25, 1967)	* Excerpt from Bullet Park
"The Yellow Room"*	Playboy (January 1968)	* Excerpt from Bullet Park
"Playing Fields"*	Playboy (July 1968)	* Excerpt from Bullet Park
"Percy"	The New Yorker (September 1, 1968)	The World of Apples
"The Fourth Alarm"	Esquire (April 1970)	The World of Apples
"Artemis, the Honest Well-Digger"	Playboy (January 1972)	The World of Apples
"The Jewels of the Cabots"	Playboy (May 1972)	The World of Apples
"Triad" ("Three Stories")	Playboy (January 1973)	The World of Apples
"The Leaves, the Lion-Fish and the Bear"*	Esquire (November 1974)	* Excerpt from Falconer
"The Folding-Chair Set"*	The New Yorker (October 13, 1975)	* Excerpt from Falconer
"Falconer"*	Playboy (January 1976)	* Excerpt from Falconer
"President of the Argentine"	The Atlantic (April 1976)	-
"Falconer"*	Ladies' Home Journal (July 1977)	* Excerpt from Falconer
"The Night Mummy Got the Wrong Mink Coat"	The New Yorker (April 13, 1980)	-
"The Island"	The New Yorker (April 19, 1981)	-
