= Frederick Ungar Publishing Company =

American publishing firm (1940–1985)

- Status: Defunct
- Founded: 1940
- Founder: Frederick Ungar
- Defunct: 1985
- Successor: Continuum Publishing Company
- Country of origin: United States
- Headquarters location: New York City
- Publication types: Books

Frederick Ungar Publishing Company was a New York publishing firm which was founded in 1940. It was acquired by Continuum International Publishing Group in 1985.

== History ==
The Frederick Ungar Publishing Company published over 2,000 titles, including reference books such as the Encyclopedia of World Literature in the 20th Century and many works on literature and cinema. The more than 200 translations published by the firm of works by such authors as Thomas Mann, including his Betrachtungen eines Unpolitischen (1918) (translated as Reflections of a Nonpolitical Man), Erich Fromm and Goethe helped make those works more popular in the United States.

The company was acquired by Continuum Publishing Company in 1985.

== Frederick "Fritz" Ungar ==
Frederick "Fritz" Ungar (born Friedrich Ungar) worked as a publisher from 1922 and co-founded the publishing houses Phaidon Verlag (later Phaidon Press) and Saturn Verlag in Vienna. With the Nazis coming to power in his country, he left Austria for New York in 1939 and founded the Frederick Ungar Publishing Company there in 1940. He died in 1988.

== Book series ==
- American Classics
- Atlantic Paperbacks
- College Translations
- A Library of Literary Criticism
- Literature and Life: American Writers
- Literature and Life: British Writers
- Literature and Life: Mystery Writers
- The Literatures of the World in English Translation: A Bibliography
- Medical Viewpoint Series
- Milestones of Thought
- Milestones of Thought in the History of Ideas
- Modern Film Scripts
- Modern Literature Monographs
- Renaissance Text Series
- RKO Classic Screenplays
- Ungar Film Library
- Ungar Paperbacks
- Ungar Writers' Recognitions Series
- World Dramatists
