= Earthly Creatures =

1953 short fiction collection

- First edition, paperback
- Publisher: Farrar, Straus and Young (hardback), Ballantine Books (paperback)
- Publication date: September 1953
- Media type: Print
- Pages: 222 (paperback)
- OCLC: 2175451

Earthly Creatures is a collection of short fiction by Charles R. Jackson published in 1953 by Farrar, Straus and Young.

== Stories ==
Preface: A note to the reader by Charles Jackson.

- “The Boy Who Ran Away (Harper’s Bazaar, November 1952)
- “Romeo”
- “The Break” (Collier's, September 1, 1953)
- “A Sunday Drive” (1939)
- “Money”
- “Parting at Morning” (Today's Women, May 1953)
- “The Cheat”
- “The Sleeper Awakened”
- “Old Men and Boys”
- “The Outlander”

== Background and publication ==
Jackson's motivation for writing this short story collection was two-fold: his desperate financial situation, and his desire to maintain his presence in the literary community.

Ballantine Books and Farrar, Straus and Young arranged to have the collection issued in both hardcover ($1.50 retail) and paperback (35 cents). Sales were boosted by a number of good reviews: 85,000 of the mass market paperbacks were sold.

Literary critic John W. Crowley reports “Sales were light overall and almost exclusively in paperback, making the hardcover format (with jacket copy not elsewhere available) by far the rarest of Jackson's books.

== Reception ==
Critical approval of the collection was widespread, even “generous.” Critic Harvey Breit at the New York Times Book Review declared: “We have never seen Mr. Jackson better...” October 4, 1953.

Budd Schulberg in New York Times Book Review: “A giftedly readable and provocative collection...it is in a far deeper sense that this fine group of stories enriches us...” Willian Peden at the Saturday Review: “The central character of most of the short stories in Charles Jackson's Earthly Creatures is his own worst enemy...We watch him, in story after story, methodically going about the business of destroying himself.”

Jackson's himself did not think highly of the volume; only two of the stories, “The Break” and “The Boy Who Ran Awary” did he consider satisfactory. Jackson wrote in the preface he was “fully (perhaps I should say ‘bitterly’) conscious of the knowledge they are somewhat less than the ideal in a form I love.”

Despite Jackson's hopes to the contrary Earthly Creatures “did not revive the career of a writer still largely known for a first novel,” namely The Lost Weekend (1944).

== Theme ==
Biographer Mark Connelly writes:

The theme of middle-aged angst runs through Earthly Creatures. Most of the protagonists are troubled by the loss of youth, a mounting sense of their mortality, and the transience of life.” Connelly adds that—compared to his stories from The Sunnier Side: Twelve Arcadian Tales (1950)—“Jackson’s earth-bound creatures seem etiolated and vitiated, moving through a life of passionless routine.”

== Sources ==
- Bailey, Blake. 2013. Farther and Wilder: The Lost Weekends and Literary Dreams of Charles Jackson. Alfred A. Knopf, New York. ISBN 978-0-307-27358-1
- Breit, Harvey. 1950. “Talk With Charles Jackson” The New York Times Book Review, April 30, 1950. 1953.
- Connelly, Mark. 2001. Deadly Closets: The Fiction of Charles Jackson. University Press of America, Lanham, New York, Oxford. ISBN 0-7618-1912-6
- Crowley, John W. 2011. The Dark Side of Charles Jackson's Sunnier Side. American Literary Realism Vol. 43, No. 3 (Spring 2011), pp. 259-278. https://www.jstor.org/stable/10.5406/amerlitereal.43.3.0259?seq=1 Accessed 30 May, 2025.
- Jackson, Charles R.. 2013. The Sunnier Side and Other Stories. Introduction by Blake Bailey. Vintage Books, New York. ISBN 978-0-307-94872-4
- Peden, William. 1953. “Self-Destructors” Saturday Review, October 10, 1953.
- Schulberg, Budd. 1953, “Into the Dark Caves; EARTHLY CREATURES. Ten Stories by Charles Jackson.” New York Times Book Review, September 13, 1953. https://www.nytimes.com/1953/09/13/archives/into-the-dark-caves-earthly-creatures-ten-stories-by-charles.html Accessed 20 June, 2025.
