= The Boy Who Ran Away =

- Short story by Charles R. Jackson
- Country: United States
- Language: English

Publication
- Published in: Harper’s Bazaar
- Publication date: November 1952

“The Boy Who Ran Away” is a work of short fiction by Charles R. Jackson originally appearing in Harper’s Bazaar (November 1952) and first collected in Earthly Creatures (1953) published by Farrar, Straus and Young.

The story was the longest ever featured in Harper's Bazaar to date.

Jackson ranked this work among his favorites, along with his “Palm Sunday” (Summer 1939) and "Rachel's Summer" (Fall 1939).

== Plot ==
“The Boy Who Ran Away” is presented from a third-person limited point-of-view; Henry Price is the focal character. The story is set in a gentrified American county in the late 1940s. The events take place on New Year's Day. Henry Price and his wife Janet and their 12- and 8-year old daughters live on a posh estate serviced by domestic staff. They socialize at alcohol-fueled parties with their upper-middle class neighbors. The couple are preparing to attend a local New Year's Eve party. At home, their girls dress up in aprons, mixing make-believe cocktails with Kool-aid and ginger ale.

Janet's sister, Betty, and her husband, George, rent a farmhouse from the Prices; George is content to farm the property. Their two sons, the 10-year-old Danny and the 4-year-old John play with their Price cousins.

Henry, in his late 40s, is sometimes a sharp-tongued petty tyrant, a character flaw which his long-suffering wife Janet lovingly endures. He dotes upon his daughters, especially his eldest, Mary. Though he favors his sister-in-law, Henry despises her eldest son Danny, who is socially disaffected and withdrawn. Though highly intelligent and imaginative, the boy is odd-looking: “[H]e had a thin bony face...bloodless lips, baby teeth, and sensitive nostrils that seemed to be forever quivering...He walked with an odd gait, artificial rather than effeminate.” Danny's affectation to appear manly infuriates Henry, all the more for his having suffered from the same anxieties and humiliations when he was a child. Despite this—or because of it—Henry cannot tolerate Danny.

Henry's most cherished possession is an exquisite model replica of a Stanley Steamer, a recent gift from Mary. He indulges his nephew John by allowing the child to play with it. When Henry is informed that the delicate model has been demolished, he is ready to forgive the four-year-old, but flies into a rage when he discovers that Danny is the culprit. Moreover, Henry is disgusted when Danny flees into the kitchen to escape punishment, an act he condemns as cowardly. His violent outburst elicits an admonishment from Janet. Henry is aware that his reaction is based in his own fear and self-loathing, but begins to rationalize his behavior when confronted by his sister-in-law Betty. He realizes that both his wife and sister-in-law regard his behavior as pathetic. Henry petulantly insists on staying home rather than attend the holiday party; he begins to drink, descending into a vortex of relentless self-recrimination and abject despair. Drunk, he crawls into bed alone long after midnight and reflects on his nephew Danny:

[The boy was] the source of his misery, the cause of tonight’s horrible fiasco…he despised Danny with all his accumulated passion, and hated him bitterly, for good and all, in all his lonely passion. Oh, he understood Danny completely—too well!—but he knew he would never, never forgive him.

== Theme ==
“The Boy Who Ran Away” serves as a “desolate epilogue" to the Earthly Creatures collection, where protagonist Henry Price—reminiscent of Jackson's alter ego Don Birnum in The Sunnier Side (1950)—has never escaped his own unresolved childhood humiliations and consequent rage. Price's brutality towards the boy Danny deepens his own isolation and self-loathing. Bailey writes: “The more shameful his own behavior, the more Price lashed out to others, until at last he proceeds to get drunk, alone...”

Jackson describes the moment of Price's epiphany:

A thought struck him like a shock; there is probably nothing in life more unbearable than to hate oneself, to not be able to stand oneself...He drank—how does one get outside oneself? How is it possible, when one loathes oneself so much…What does one do about it? Can one become somebody else? Another person? A new man, say? The answer was a dreadful No, No, and again No!

Bailey extols this “scathing, exhaustive, brilliant, self-indictment...” Price's epiphany is an empty one, however. Critic William Peden notes that “the truth does not set him free [and] he remains a debased, half-emasculated, later-day Prometheus.” Critic Budd Schulberg attests to the horror of Price's predicament, “The story presses self-analysis to the point of evisceration. Sensitive, urbane, gentle Henry Price turns upon himself with self-loathing, ripping at his own vitals like any animal tortured in a trap beyond endurance.”

Author Mary McCarthy, in a personal communication, cautioned Jackson against indulging in literary self-flagellation: "Nobody is capable of self-hatred of such really heroic proportions; much as we think we dislike ourselves, we are too self-loving, biologically..."

Charles R. Jackson, anticipating that the story would appear in anthologies of short fiction, was disappointed by its post-publication neglect.

== Sources ==
- Bailey, Blake. 2013 (1). Farther and Wilder: The Lost Weekends and Literary Dreams of Charles Jackson.Alfred A. Knopf, New York. ISBN 978-0-307-27358-1
- Bailey, Blake. 2013 (2). Introduction: The Sunnier Side and Other Stories. pp. xiii-xxiii. Vintage Books, New York. ISBN 978-0-307-94872-4
- Connelly, Mark. 2001. Deadly Closets: The Fiction of Charles Jackson. University Press of America, Lanham, New York, Oxford. ISBN 0-7618-1912-6
- Jackson, Charles R.. 2013. The Sunnier Side and Other Stories. Introduction by Blake Bailey. Vintage Books, New York. ISBN 978-0-307-94872-4
- Peden, William. 1953. “Self-Destructors” Saturday Review, October 10, 1953.
- Schulberg, Budd. 1953, “Into the Dark Caves; EARTHLY CREATURES. Ten Stories by Charles Jackson.” New York Times Book Review, September 13, 1953. https://www.nytimes.com/1953/09/13/archives/into-the-dark-caves-earthly-creatures-ten-stories-by-charles.html Accessed 20 June, 2025.
