= Some People, Places, and Things That Will Not Appear in My Next Novel =

1961 collection of short fiction by John Cheever

Some People, Places, and Things That Will Not Appear In My Next Novel
- First edition cover
- Author: John Cheever
- Language: English
- Publisher: Harper and Bros.
- Publication date: 1961
- Publication place: United States
- Media type: Print (hardcover)
- Pages: 175
- ISBN: 9780836934496

Some People, Places and Things That Will Not Appear In My Next Novel is a collection of short fiction by John Cheever, published by Harper and Bros. in 1961. These nine short stories first appeared individually in The New Yorker or Esquire magazines. These works are included in the collection The Stories of John Cheever (1978), published by Alfred A. Knopf.

== Stories ==
The original date of publication and name of the journal appear in parentheses.:
"The Wrysons" (The New Yorker, September 15, 1958)
"The Duchess" (The New Yorker, December 13, 1958)
"The Scarlet Moving Van" (The New Yorker, March 21, 1959)
"Brimmer" (Esquire, August 1959)
"The Golden Age" (The New Yorker, September 26, 1959)
"The Lowboy" (The New Yorker, October 10, 1959)
"The Death of Justina" (Esquire, November 1960)
"Boy in Rome" (Esquire, February 1960)
"A Miscellany of Characters That Will Not Appear" (The New Yorker, November 12, 1960)

== Reception and Assessment ==
Biographer Patrick Meanor reports that "most critics were not pleased with the stylistic quality of its stories. Only 'The Death of Justina' and possibly 'Boy in Rome' can be favorably compared with the earlier accomplishments of 'The Country Husband' or 'The Sorrows of Gin'".

Meanor adds that "the tone of most of these stories is bitter, and a disturbing air of apocalyptic collapse pervades the collection." Literary critic Lynne Waldeland describes Some People, Places and Things That Will Not Appear In My Next Novel "Cheever's most curious volume of short stories…in which some critics have seen a conscious plan to depart in the future from certain themes and techniques."

Biographer Scott Donaldson offers the assessment of the collection:

Despite including the magnificent "Death of Justina," Some People contained fewer excellent stories than any collection since The Way Some People Live (1943). Two of the stories —"Brimmer" and "The Golden Age"—are little more than anecdotes constructed to build up to a punchline. A pervasive discontentment and disillusionment runs through the book."

== Sources ==
- Bailey, Blake. 2009. Notes on Text in John Cheever: Collected Stories and Other Writing. The Library of America. Pp. 1025-1028 ISBN 978-1-59853-034-6
- Donaldson, Scott. 1988. John Cheever: A Biography. Random House, New York. ISBN 0-394-54921-X
- Meanor, Patrick. 1995. John Cheever Revisited. Twayne Publishers, New York. ISBN 0-8057-3999-8
- O'Hara, James E. 1989. John Cheever: A Study of the Short Fiction. Twayne Publishers, Boston Massachusetts. Twayne Studies in Short Fiction no 9. ISBN 0-8057-8310-5
- Waldeland, Lynne. 1979. John Cheever. Twayne Publishers, G. K. Hall & Company, Boston, Massachusetts. ISBN 0-8057-7251-0
