= How War Came to Arcadia, N. Y. =

- Short story by Charles R. Jackson
- Country: United States
- Language: English

Publication
- Published in: The Sunnier Side: Twelve Arcadian Tales
- Publisher: Farrar, Straus and Giroux
- Publication date: April 13, 1950

"How War Came to Arcadia, N. Y." is a short story by Charles R. Jackson first collected in The Sunnier Side: Twelve Arcadian Tales in 1950 by Farrar, Straus and Giroux.

A coming of age story, "How War Came to Arcadia, N. Y." is one of Jackson's eight "Arcadian tales" that feature his autobiographical character Don Birnam as narrator.

== Plot ==
"How War Came to Arcadia, N. Y." is told from a first-person limited point-of-view. The narrator is adolescent Don Birnam, the "alter ego and fictional surrogate" of the author. The story is set in the fictional town of Arcadia, New York in 1916—the year the United States entered World War I. The story opens when the United States Congress has yet to become militarily involved in a European conflict. Don is one of several boys who delivers the local newspapers in Arcadia. He enjoys the self-importance of being the bearer of breaking overseas news to subscribers.

A "sharply defined caste system" determines that boys from well-to-do families are assigned the morning routes serving homes of subscribers. The afternoon routes are delegated to the poorer boys whose wages supplement their family income; they are required to hock any remaining papers on downtown streets; this is considered a mildly disreputable task. Though not a member of the social elite, the 13-year-old Don delivers the morning paper; he relishes the sixty-cent-a-week job that allows him to discover interesting parts of town. He particularly enjoys delivering papers to a blacksmith shop operated by two German immigrant brothers, Hans and Fritz Schmidt. He is fascinated by the men's outfits and the equipment they skillfully operate performing their trade, often lingering to watch them: "I loved Schmidts’ blacksmith shop." He teases the Schmidt brothers—both stanch German nationalists—when their country of origin experiences military defeats. The men, nonetheless, engage Don seriously as a mature youth.

The unfolding war in Europe and Arcadia’s preoccupation with it takes on a festive quality creating "a kind of holiday" atmosphere. Far from the realities of the war, Don and his classmates —all Anglophiles and Francophiles—propose techniques by which Wilhelm II, Kaiser of Germany might be tortured. One boy suggests that his testicles be placed on an anvil and repeatedly pounded with a small hammer: this meets with general approval. Don discovers that the Schimidts have displayed a German flag in their shop; he informs them that the German navy has suffered a setback at the Battle of Jutland. The patriot brothers remain obdurate, assuring Don that Germany will prevail, but regret that Americans may suffer as a result. The boy secretly prays that the United States will never enter the war. On his fourteenth birthday, April 6, 1917, the US Congress declared war on Germany. Don exults that he will be the bearer of this momentous news to his community. Rather than inform the Schimdts personally, he furtively drops off their newspaper at their shop.

War fever takes hold of Arcadia; American flags festoon every public and private venue. The wartime mobilization includes propaganda pamphlets with sexually lurid descriptions of purported German atrocities: "I had never seen such things in print before, and neither had the other boys." After US troops land in Europe, Don grasps that his relationship with the Schmidts has become impossibly strained and unnatural. The brothers have changed their business placard to read "Carl and Henry Smith, Blacksmiths" due to anti-German hostility.

Don's feelings about the war are conflicted after viewing the American propaganda film The Beast of Berlin. He becomes fascinated by the lobby poster depicting the Kaiser; he obtains the image and mounts it in his bedroom closet.

When the son of the a Hamilton family who live in the Birnam neighborhood dies in France, his parents hang a gold star on their service flag. After grieving, they finally accept their loss. Arcadia honors their sacrifice. A year and a half later—long after the war has ended—the family is informed that the boys’ corpse has been exhumed and shipped to them from overseas in a box. Dismayed, the parents retrieve the remains from the train station and place it on their front porch. They endure an agony performing the formal burial of their son. The narrator Don observes:

To us it had been a brief reminder that something had really been going on after all—something, at least, besides all the fun we had been having in Arcadia.

== Critical appraisal ==
Biographer Blake Bailey ranks the story among Jackson's post-1948 work, indulging in more in "individual felicities" than establishing clear thematic schemes. Literary critic Mark Connelly regards Jackson's ability to depict episodes from his early youth as a virtue:

Jackson goes to great lengths to demonstrate the power of total recall, compiling numerous details to carefully reconstruct small town life in the first decades of the twentieth century.

== Theme ==
The events described in the story take place in 1917 just before the entry of the United States into WWI and mass mobilization of workers for combat. Left unmentioned is that 1917 marked the year of the Russian Revolution. Jackson acknowledges the existence of class distinctions in Arcadia, yet falls short of class consciousness. The 13-year-old narrator remarks that social distinctions "seem to happen of themselves…apparently without design."

Critic Connelly writes: "Don Birnum becomes acutely aware of how the rigid class system affected life in Arcadia" and one which the narrator himself describes as "a rather sharply defined caste system."

Though all the boys handled the same local news periodicals, a clear distinction was made: Servicing a "paper route" and delivering papers to a customer's doorstep was considered honorable, but a stigma was attached to those boys who "peddled" or "sold" papers in the downtown district.

In Arcadia it wasn’t considered "nice" to sell papers…If you sold papers, well, you were nothing but a paper boy, but is delivered them you had a paper route…

Viewing allied propaganda screeds purporting to show German atrocities against Belgian woman, and the film The Beast of Berlin, Don is both appalled and intrigued. Though he exhibits some homophilic impulses, his sexual identity is not explicitly identified in this tale.

Literary critic John W. Crowley notes that Don is increasingly sensitive to "signs of manliness": an American army officer wearing a wristwatch, he at first considers it effeminate. When his 11-year-old brother insists on knitting articles of clothing for army recruists at a movie theater, Don explodes in rage. Crowley adds this observation:

The words "homosexual" and/or "heterosexual," were not in general circulation during Don’s (or Jackson’s) youth. Sexual identity was more fluid, less strictly bifurcated, than it would be for boys coming of age after 1920. It might be argued that the intensity of Birnam’s adult gender anxiety results, at least in part, from the absence during his boyhood of such sharply invidious distinctions."

The ending of "How War Came to Arcadia, N. Y." provides a key thematic insight rendered from the awkward and tragic events surrounding the Hamilton family's son, a doughboy, killed in France. The parents are flummuxed by the arrival of his exhumed remains—not in a casket, but a large box—months after the war has ended. Literary critic Mark Connelly writes:

Perplexed, the family is unsure how to react. It would be unnatural to have a funeral so long after their son’s death, yet they cannot bring themselves to dispose of the remains without ceremony. The body of the young man is a haunting reminder that behind the propaganda films, Kaiser-baiting, flags, and uniforms was a human tragedy.

== Sources ==
- Bailey, Blake. 2013. Introduction: The Sunnier Side and Other Stories. pp. xiii-xxiii. Vintage Books, New York. ISBN 978-0-307-94872-4
- Connelly, Mark. 2001. Deadly Closets: The Fiction of Charles Jackson. University Press of America, Lanham, New York, Oxford. ISBN 0-7618-1912-6
- Crowley, John W. 2011. The Dark Side of Charles Jackson’s Sunnier Side. American Literary Realism, Vol. 43, No. 3 (Spring 2011), pp. 259–278. https://www.jstor.org/stable/10.5406/amerlitereal.43.3.0259?seq=1 Accessed 30 May 2025.
- Jackson, Charles R.. 2013. The Sunnier Side and Other Stories. Introduction by Blake Bailey. Vintage Books, New York. ISBN 978-0-307-94872-4
