= The Band Concert (short story) =

- Short story by Charles R. Jackson
- Country: United States
- Language: English

Publication
- Published in: The Sunnier Side: Twelve Arcadian Tales
- Publisher: Farrar, Straus and Giroux
- Publication date: April 13, 1950

"The Band Concert" is a short story by Charles R. Jackson and first collected in The Sunnier Side: Twelve Arcadian Tales in 1950 by Farrar, Straus and Giroux.

A coming of age story, “The Band Concert” is the first in a short story sequence of Jackson’s eight “Arcadian tales” that feature his autobiographical character Don Birnam as narrator.

== Plot ==
“The Band Concert” is told from a first-person limited point-of-view. The narrator is the 8-or 9-year-old Don Birnam, the “alter ego and fictional surrogate” of the author. The story is set in the fictional town of Arcadia, New York around 1911 or 1912.

The Birnam family children discover that their next door neighbors, the Dettersons, have hired a summer domestic worker, a young Canadian “girl” named Angela, who “looked like a grownup.” The Birnum children are encouraged to include her in their games and discover her to be childlike in her enthusiasm. When Don innocently calls her a “fool” for an inept act, Angela runs home in tears. Don is informed that in Commonwealth countries, the term is not benign, but denotes “an imbecile or a feeble-minded person”; Don is asked to be more thoughtful in his remarks.

Angela is particularly fond of outdoor performances by the Arcadia Military Band; she can barely contain her excitement for these Saturday night events. The popular ensemble is composed of local male residents, mostly small business owners as well as some factory workers. The community event is always well-attended. Don observes that Angela is fascinated by the band’s cornet player, Tony di Santo, a cannery laborer. The handsome Tony rewards Angela’s fetching behavior with seductive grins and winks.

That night after the Birnam children are sleeping at home they are awakened by their mother. Angela has not returned to the Detterson’s household: do they know where she is? From what the children tell Don’s mother she surmises what may have happened.

The next morning Mr. Detterson informs the Birnams that Angela has been located on a canal bank behind the canning factory; Tony di Santo has been implicated in her absence. In a jocular tone, Detterson remarks “I guess Angela has had her fling.” Moments later, a car pulls up and a local doctor, the owner of the cannery exit, and a disheveled Angela emerge from the vehicle; she is quickly ushered into the Detterson house. Don reports the Angela was taken back to Canada and never seen again in Arcadia.

== Critical appraisal ==
A key thematic element emerges when Mr. Detterson, Angela’s employer, cynically announces that the disgraced girl “has had her fling” (in fact, she has likely been raped by the band member Tony). Literary critic Mark Connelly notes that the naive Don Birnam is unequipped to grasp the insulting sexual connotation conveyed by the word “fling.”

I didn’t know what the phrase [“had her fling”] meant but I was excited. It conjured up a lovely picture of Angela leaning over a balustrade, flushed and happy, tossing flowers to a throng of admirers below. She wore a cap of pearls, her arms were filled with roses, and looking up from the crowd was the handsome, smiling face of Tony di Santo.

Literary critic John W. Crowley praises Jackson’s adroit handling of the limited point-of-view, adding thematic depth to the tale:

Don merely senses the disturbing realities concealed from him by an adult language he has yet to master. But like Huckleberry Finn and similarly innocent narrators in Anderson’s "I'm a Fool” (1922) and Hemingway’s “My Old Man” (1923), Don sees more than he knows: the clarity of his childish vision captures complications beyond his ken.”

Biographer Blake Bailey offers this praise: “Such a deft handling of narrative point of view,” marking an inflection point linking “innocence to experience,” adds to the overall gravity of The Sunnier Side collection.

== Sources ==
- Bailey, Blake. 2013. Farther and Wilder: The Lost Weekends and Literary Dreams of Charles Jackson. Alfred A. Knopf, New York. ISBN 978-0-307-27358-1
- Connelly, Mark. 2001. Deadly Closets: The Fiction of Charles Jackson. University Press of America, Latham, New York, Oxford. ISBN 0-7618-1912-6
- Crowley, John W. 2011. The Dark Side of Charles Jackson’s Sunnier Side. American Literary Realism, Vol. 43, No. 3 (Spring 2011), pp. 259–278. https://www.jstor.org/stable/10.5406/amerlitereal.43.3.0259?seq=1 Accessed 30 May 2025.
- Jackson, Charles R. 2013. The Sunnier Side and Other Stories. Introduction by Blake Bailey. Vintage Books, New York. ISBN 978-0-307-94872-4
