= The Fourth Alarm =

The Fourth Alarm may refer to:

- The Fourth Alarm (film), a 1926 short silent comedy film
- The Fourth Alarm (short story), a short story by John Cheever
