= Artemis, the Honest Well-Digger =

- Short story by John Cheever
- Country: United States
- Language: English

Publication
- Published in: Playboy
- Publication date: January 1972

"Artemis, the Honest Well-Digger" is a work of short fiction by John Cheever, first appearing in Playboy magazine, January 1972. The story was collected in The World of Apples (1973), published by Alfred A. Knopf.

== Plot ==
The story is written from a third-person point-of-view, with Artemis Bucklin as the focal character. The 30-year-old Artemis independently operates his water welling-drilling for a living. Dedicated to his profession, his first and last love is water. His now deceased father, who trained him in the art named the boy, in his ignorance, Artemis, believing this to be the patron saint of artesian wells. Rather, this is the chaste goddess of the hunt from ancient Greek mythology. Though Artemis has an engineering degree from a Mid-western college and is well-read, he conceals his scholastic sophistication behind a rustic and shy veneer. He lives with his elderly mother, but yearns to find a wife he hopes will resemble the virginal, fresh-faced girls depicted on oleomargarine packages.

In his quest for a mate, the attractive Artemis pursues and is pursued by a number of attractive women. A client, Mrs. Filler, repeatedly attempts to seduce the well-digger while her husband Professor Filler is lecturing in England. She offers Artemis a copy of her husband's best-selling book titled Shit (italics), a historic and cultural overview of fecal matter, in all its details. Artemis is dismayed and depressed by the frank dissertation on the topic. When Mrs. Fuller's advances become oppressive, Artemis seeks as escape in a short overseas vacation; his travel agent arranges a cut-rate excursion to Moscow. Upon arrival, Artemis is greeted by an official from a Soviet ministry who welcomes him as a member of the American proletariat. He is whisked off to meet Premiere Khrushchev at a performance of the Bolshoi Theatre. The meeting never materializes. Artemis is assigned an interpreter by the Central Government Agency to act as his personal tour guide: he instantly falls in love with the lovely Miss Natasha Funaroff. Her father, Marshal Funaroff, has been exiled to Siberia. The attraction is mutual, and when Artemis departs the USSR, they agree to correspond by mail.

Shortly after arriving back at his home, Artemis resumes his drilling operations. A love letter arrives from Natasha, gushing with lyrical phrases. Artemis responds ardently in the same vein, declaring his love in vaulting metaphors. An exchange of letters ensues. After several months Artemis is notified that an official named Mr. Cooper, who he assumes is from the Internal Revenue Service, wishes to meet with him. The man turns out to be an agent from the US State Department. Issuing blandishments, Mr. Cooper convinces Artemis that it is his patriotic duty to travel to Washington D.C. for an interview with the US Secretary of State. Artemis consents, and discovers that all his letters with Natasha have been intercepted and closely examined. He is suspected, without any concrete evidence, of having divulged state secrets in coded messages concealed in the love letters. The Secretary attempts to enlist him in a counterintelligence operation to send disinformation to Natasha by way of his supposed cipher. Artemis emphatically declines. He is urged to reconsider the matter and is released. He is never contacted again by the authorities. Artemis seeks solace in his only true love: water.

== Theme ==
Declaring that "water is the redemptive agent" in the story, literary critic Patrick Meanor detects references to Greek mythology in the name of the protagonist. Artemis's father, himself a well-digger, has maladroitly named his son after the Greek virginal fertility goddess Artemis-Diana, in the mistaken belief that this was the patron of artesian wells. Meanor considers the Cold War era elements of the story "an Ovidian dramatization of how harmless texts are metamorphosed into subtexts of international intrigue" which in turn serve to disabuse Artemis of his romantic illusions: "The innocence that Artemis loses during his story is not his virginity but his naive vision of the way the world operates.

As such, Artemis is ultimately stripped of the innocence which formerly "protected him from [the] venality and venery around him" according to biographer Scott Donaldson.

Critic Lynne Waldeland writes: "Despite the comedy and satire in the story, its dominant note is the poignant characterizations of Artemis, a sort a portraiture at which Cheever excels."

== Sources ==
- Bailey, Blake. 2008. Notes on Text in John Cheever: Collected Stories and Other Writing. The Library of America. pp.1025-1028 ISBN 978-1-59853-034-6
- Meanor, Patrick. 1995. John Cheever Revisited. Twayne Publishers, New York. ISBN 0-8057-3999-8
- O'Hara, James E. 1989. John Cheever: A Study of the Short Fiction. Twayne Publishers, Boston Massachusetts. Twayne Studies in Short Fiction no 9. ISBN 0-8057-8310-5
- Waldeland, Lynne. 1979. John Cheever. Twayne Publishers, G. K. Hall & Co., Boston, Massachusetts. ISBN 0-8057-7251-0
