= Publick House =

- Short story by John Cheever
- Country: United States
- Language: English

Publication
- Published in: The New Yorker
- Publication date: August 16, 1941

"Publick House" is a short story by John Cheever which first appeared in The New Yorker on August 16, 1941. The work was included in the short fiction collection The Way Some People Live (1943), published by Random House.

== Plot ==
Lincoln Briggs is spending his seasonal break from college at his family's old summer homestead in Maine at the invitation of his mother, Agnes. He discovers, to his dismay, that she has converted the historic residence into an antique boutique and tearoom that serves brunch. The placard displayed at the entrance reads "Publick House, 1750."

Agnes is portrayed as an enthusiastic and high-functioning mistress who presides over every aspect of this new enterprise, including her hired help. She engages with her mostly female and well-to-do clientele, plying them with historical anecdotes so as to promote the colonial era provenance of the furnishings and dinner ware. Mrs. Briggs is single-mindedly selling off these items at premium prices. Lincoln is troubled by his mother's merchandising of his family's legacy. Everything is for sale.

Lincoln's maternal grandfather lives on the premises. An elderly dependent, he confronts Agnes, accusing his daughter of marketing the family heritage: "I'm sick of these god-damned tearoom people and I'm sick of this god-damned tearoom food…You've sold my mother's china. You sold the rugs. You sold the portraits. You've made a business out of it—selling the past. What kind of business is that? Selling the past?"

Lincoln and his mother share an evening meal of leftovers. Agnes, exhausted from the day's work, shares her anxieties about the daunting financial circumstances that confront her. She slips into a recitation of the anecdotes she compulsively repeats to her customers about the historical significance of the "Publick House." At the close of this litany "She let her arms drop to her sides and her mouth fell open and she began to cry."

== Critical assessment ==
Literary critic Lynne Waldeland considers "Publick House "an unusually successful story", noting the autobiographical origins of the story: "Cheever seems to draw directly on his own family experience to some degree, the time on his mother's running a gift shop."

Waldeland points out the key dramatic dichotomy in Cheever's tale of domestic strife:

There is an initial conflict between Mrs. Briggs's apparent satisfaction with her work and the resentment of her father and her son at turning their home into a place of business. But at the end we realize that there is an inner conflict in Mrs. Briggs herself, and with that revelation the story ends. The characters, especially Mrs. Briggs, are well drawn in this story, and the climax is dramatically handled.

== Theme ==
The story is clearly an autobiographical and "bitter" documentation of the retail commercial enterprise that Cheever's mother, Mary, had operated when Cheever was in his early twenties.

Biographer Patrick Meanor writes:

The story is a thinly veiled version of exactly what happened to John Cheever's family as his mother, after the family home was lost during the Great Depression, opened the profitable "Mary Cheever Gift Shop" in Quincy, Massachusetts.

Meanor observes that "What saves the story from becoming a mere condemnation of an overly aggressive, cold woman is the ironic concluding scene, which becomes one of Cheever's earliest examples for his gift of turning a predictable story into something chillingly epiphanic…What seemed an ostensibly straightforward of a woman enjoying her newfound managerial freedom becomes, in the last paragraph, a deeply probing psychological analysis of a strong but still vulnerable woman…"

== Sources ==
- Bailey, Blake. 2009. Notes on Text in John Cheever: Collected Stories and Other Writing. The Library of America. Pp.1025-1028 ISBN 978-1-59853-034-6
- Cheever, John. 2009. John Cheever: Collected Stories and Other Writing. The Library of America. ISBN 978-1-59853-034-6
- Coale, Samuel. 1977. John Cheever. Frederick Ungar Publishing Company, New York. ISBN 0-8044-6081-7
- Donaldson, Scott. 1988. John Cheever: A Biography. Random House, New York. ISBN 0-394-54921-X
- O'Hara, James E. 1989. John Cheever: A Study of the Short Fiction. Twayne Publishers, Boston Massachusetts. Twayne Studies in Short Fiction no 9. ISBN 0-8057-8310-5
- Meanor, Patrick. 1995. John Cheever Revisited. Twayne Publishers, New York. ISBN 0-8057-3999-8
- Waldeland, Lynne. 1979. John Cheever. Twayne Publishers, G. K. Hall & Company, Boston, Massachusetts. ISBN 0-8057-7251-0
