= The World of Apples =

1973 book of short fiction by John Cheever

- First edition cover
- Author: John Cheever
- Language: English
- Publisher: Alfred A. Knopf
- Publication date: 1973
- Publication place: United States
- Media type: Print (hardcover)
- Pages: 174
- ISBN: 9780394483467

The World of Apples is the sixth collection of short fiction by author John Cheever, published in 1973 by Alfred A. Knopf. The ten stories originally appeared individually in The New Yorker, Esquire, The Saturday Evening Post or Playboy.

The publication of The World of Apples coincided with Cheever's nomination to the American Academy of Arts and Letters.

== Stories ==
The original date of publication and name of the journal appear in parentheses.:
"The Chimera" (The New Yorker, July 4, 1961)
"Mene, Mene, Tekel, Upharsin" (The New Yorker, April 27, 1963)
"Montraldo" (The New Yorker, June 6, 1964)
"The Geometry of Love" (Saturday Evening Post, January 1, 1966)
"The World of Apples" (Esquire, December 1966)
"Percy" (The New Yorker, September 21, 1968)
"The Fourth Alarm" (Esquire, April 1970)
"Artemis, the Honest Well-Digger" (Playboy, January 1972)
"The Jewels of the Cabots" (Playboy, May 1972)
"Three Stories" [as "Triad"] (Playboy, January 1973)

== Reception ==
“The volume contains some very fine stories, particularly ‘The Fourth Alarm’, ‘Percy’, ‘Artemis, the Honest Well Digger and ‘The World of Apples.’ However, none of them is better than the masterpieces which have already been singled out from his earlier volumes. Some are more effectively structured than others, and they differ greatly from one another in subject and style. No particular theme seems to connect a significant number of themes in the collection…as a whole, the volume defies classification and easy analysis, for the stories make a variety of demands on the reader. - Literary critic Lynne Waldeland in John Cheever (1979).

The World of Apples received outstanding reviews upon its release, and according to biographer Blake Bailey "some of the best reviews of Cheever's career."

Literary critic Lynne Waldeland reports that Larry Woiwode of the New York Times Book Review praised the volume as "an extraordinary book, a transfiguring experience for the reader, and Cheever at his best…"

Biographer Scott Donaldson offers this measured assessment of the collection:

Critics as well as his artistic peers were well disposed toward Cheever's work in the spring of 1973. They gave The World of Apples a strongly favorable reception, though it is arguable that few of the stories in the book measure up to Cheever's best…only rarely do they achieve the emotional power of "The Enormous Radio" or "Goodbye, My Brother" or "The Country Husband" or '"The Swimmer"."

== Sources ==
- Bailey, Blake. 2009 (1). Notes on Text in John Cheever: Collected Stories and Other Writing. The Library of America. Pp. 1025-1028 ISBN 978-1-59853-034-6
- Bailey, Blake. 2009 (2). Cheever: A Life. Alfred A. Knopf, New York. 770 pp. ISBN 978-1-4000-4394-1
- Donaldson, Scott. 1988. John Cheever: A Biography. Random House, New York. ISBN 0-394-54921-X
- Meanor, Patrick. 1995. John Cheever Revisited. Twayne Publishers, New York. ISBN 0-8057-3999-8
- O'Hara, James E. 1989. John Cheever: A Study of the Short Fiction. Twayne Publishers, Boston Massachusetts. Twayne Studies in Short Fiction no 9. ISBN 0-8057-8310-5
- Waldeland, Lynne. 1979. John Cheever. Twayne Publishers, G. K. Hall & Company, Boston, Massachusetts. ISBN 0-8057-7251-0
