= Fernando Valerio-Holguin =

Dominican professor and academic (b. 1956)

Fernando Valerio-Holguin is a college professor at Colorado State University. He holds a Ph.D. in Hispanic Literature and has conducted research on the Caribbean Diaspora, slavery narrative, and post-modern hybridity among music, film, and literature. He has published two poetry books, four books filled with short stories, along with many published essays on the topics of Caribbean culture, literature, and film.

== Early life and education ==
Valerio-Holguin was born in La Vega, Dominican Republic. He received a bachelor's degree in literature from the Universidad Autónoma de Santo Domingo in 1982, a Master of Arts in Spanish American Literature from Tulane University in 1987, and a Doctor of Philosophy, also from Tulane, in Spanish American Literature and Literary Theory (1994), as a holder of a Fulbright Scholarship .

== Career ==
Valerio-Holguin was hired in 1982 as assistant professor at the Universidad Autonoma de Santo Domingo in the Dominican Republic. He remained in this position for three years. He also worked as a provisional professor at the same university from 1987 through 1991. In 1991, he became an assistant Spanish professor at Tulane University, moving in 1994 to Allegheny College, and in 1999, to Colorado State University. At Colorado State, he was promoted to associate professor in 2002 and to full professor in 2008.

An interview with Valerio-Holguin was included in the 2018 book Voces con Caudal by Carlos Enrique Cabrera.

== Books and Published Works (selected) ==
=== Anthology ===
- Autoretratos (Poetry, 2002)
- Las Eras Del Viento (Poetry, 2006)
- Viajantes Insomnes (Short Stories, 1983)
- Café Insomnia (Short Stories, 2002)
- El Palacio de Eros (Short Stories, 2004)
- Elogio de las Salamadras (Short Stories, 2006)
- Retratos: palabras sobre lienzo

=== Novels ===
- Memorias del Ultimo Cielo (2002)
- Los Huespedes del Paraiso (2008)

== Academic works ==
- Poética de la frialdad: la narrativa de Virgilio Piñera. Lanham, Md: University Press of America, 1997.
