= Rachel's Summer =

"Rachel’s Summer"
- Short story by Charles R. Jackson
- Language: English

Publication
- Published in: Partisan Review
- Publication date: Fall 1939
- Publication place: United States

"Rachel’s Summer" is a short story by Charles R. Jackson originally appearing in Partisan Review (Fall 1939) and first collected in The Sunnier Side: Twelve Arcadian Tales in 1950 by Farrar, Straus and Giroux.

== Background ==
The story is a fictional re-configuring of the death of Jackson’s sixteen-year-old sister Thelma and his four-year-old brother, Richard, both of whom died in 1916 when a locomotive struck the car in which they were passengers. Jackson was 13-years-of-age at the time. In “Rachel’s Summer” Jackson changed Thelma’s name to Rachel and altered the details of the vehicular accident; his brother Richard does not appear in the short story.

Though appearing in the penultimate Table of Contents position in reissues of The Sunnier Side volumes, “Rachel’s Summer” was “aptly” positioned as the final story in the original 1950 collection.

== Theme ==
The story is a concise exposure of collective intolerance towards unsanctioned sexuality set in a small American town in the early 20th century.

According to biographer Mark Connelly, Jackson regarded Rachel/Thelma “as a sacrificial victim, someone chosen to fulfill an unspoken ritual of expiation of sexual fear and guilt.” Biographer Blake Bailey confirms the theme of sacrifice:

A spirited, pretty girl who always refused to act shocked when boys whistled at her, Rachel is an ideal scapegoat for all the other maidens of Arcadia who might bring shame upon their families.”

The author himself makes this theme explicit in the following passage:

[P]eriodically, as if by some mystic council, a girl was chosen for the sacrifice, and the pressure of parental anxiety was relieved in the neighborhood for another season or two. What could have been more natural than to choose Rachel, the gayest, the most promising, loveliest of them all.

At the center of this tragic tale is a devastating irony; Rachel is kept in the village by her mother merely to deflect rumors she is pregnant out of wedlock. Had her mother’s fear that her daughter would be stigmatized not been threatened, the girl would have been safely at her grandmother’s house in the Catskills on the day of the accident. The mother’s efforts are for naught: Rachel dies before her condition can be determined by the residents of Arcadia.

The Arcadia community assumes that the girl died for her sins before she could be publicly disgraced. According to some residents, God, in his mercy, had permitted the daughter to be near her mother in the final weeks of her life. Mrs. Birnam knows very well that Rachel only remained in town to disprove suspicions that she had violated the moral codes of the community. As such, she regards the locals as accessories before the fact in her daughter’s demise.

Mrs. Birnam is denied closure on the matter on her daughter’s condition at the time of her death, depriving the “vibrant, beautiful, inquisitive, and rebellious” Rachel of redemption: “[T]hough she tried all her life to dismiss the rumor, she couldn’t help seeking reassurance, again and again, [that] it wasn’t true.”

== Sources ==
- Bailey, Blake. 2013 (1). Farther and Wilder: The Lost Weekends and Literary Dreams of Charles Jackson. Alfred A. Knopf, New York. ISBN 978-0-307-27358-1
- Bailey, Blake. 2013 (2). Introduction: The Sunnier Side and Other Stories. pp. xiii-xxiii. Vintage Books, New York. ISBN 978-0-307-94872-4
- Connelly, Mark. 2001. Deadly Closets: The Fiction of Charles Jackson. University Press of America, Latham, New York, Oxford. ISBN 0-7618-1912-6
- Crowley, John W. 2011. The Dark Side of Charles Jackson’s Sunnier Side. American Literary Realism. Vol. 43, No. 3 (Spring 2011), pp. 259-278. https://www.jstor.org/stable/10.5406/amerlitereal.43.3.0259?seq=1 Accessed 30 May, 2025.
- Jackson, Charles R.. 2013. The Sunnier Side and Other Stories. Introduction by Blake Bailey. Vintage Books, New York. ISBN 978-0-307-94872-4
