= The World of Apples (short story) =

- Short story by John Cheever
- Country: United States
- Language: English

Publication
- Published in: Esquire
- Publication date: December 1966

"The World of Apples" is a work of short fiction by John Cheever, first appearing in Esquire, December 1966. The story was collected in the volume The World of Apples (1973), published by Alfred A. Knopf.

== Plot ==
Asa Boscomb is an 82-year-old American expatriate and widower living in Italy; he has not revisited the rural Vermont of his youth for over 40 years. He lives in relative anonymity at his villa south of Rome. As an internationally acclaimed poet, almost every literary award has been bestowed upon him - except the Nobel Prize. Bascomb considers this a glaring omission. He is increasingly concerned that his memory is beginning to deteriorate, on which he depends to compose his short lyrical poems based largely on detailed reminiscences.

Bascomb's complacent internal narrative is disturbed when he accidentally encounters a couple making love in a secluded forest. The incident induces compulsive pornographic thoughts, which Bascomb commits to writing. He is appalled at his own vulgar obscenities. The scatological themes contrast sharply with the virtuous and innocent topics that characterize his most popular volume of poetry, The World of Apples. When Bascomb finds himself writing the word "F- - k" repeatedly, he takes his housekeeper's advice to make a pilgrimage to a local shrine where visitors might have their thoughts purified. There, accompanied by a priest, he makes an offering to the sacred relics. Bascomb offers a prayer to those authors who most influenced his poetry. That night he slumbers, untroubled by scatological images.

The following day, Bascomb discovers a natural waterfall near the rustic church. Inspired by the beauty of the woodland, he recalls an event from his childhood which appears to unfold in front of him. An elderly, white-haired man emerges from the forest, unashamedly strips off his clothing, and steps eagerly under the falls, crying out joyfully in the frigid waters. The old man quickly dries himself and disappears into the woods. Bascomb realizes that the apparition is a memory of his own father. Emulating the vision, Bascomb disrobes and steps under the torrential flow. The waters serve to purify his thoughts and promises to restore his creative energy during the final phase of his life. His failure to become a Nobel Prize recipient no longer troubles him.

== Critical assessment ==
Literary critic Lynne Waldeland declares that "The World of Apples" may be "the best story in the volume- carefully imagined, effectively paced, beautifully expressed. It is also tempting to see it as a quiet manifesto on Cheever's part."

"This is a story about art framed in starkly human terms, and it raises disturbing questions about the role of sexuality, as one form of beauty, in life as well as art. The challenge of treating material so inherently difficult...is greater here than in most of his stories, but Cheever answers it. Asa Bascomb never becomes a fool, and ultimately he is able to save himself." —John E. O'Hara in John Cheever: A Study of the Short Fiction (1989)

With respect to this "manifesto", Waldeland observes that the protagonist, Asa Bascomb, liberates himself from his compulsive sexual fantasies by invoking the pantheon of deceased literary figures who have influenced him as a writer in his youth.

Literary critic Samuel Coale notes that Cheever's "linear precision of style" comports with Asa Bascomb's struggle to achieve spiritual enlightenment:

Step by step the prose moves carefully, almost gingerly, as if recounting some ancient rite or ceremony...the tone and lyric grace of the prose are in complete agreement with the tone and lyric renewal of Asa Bascomb's spirit. Style and substance are one in "The World of Apples."

Coale concludes: "The deceptive simplicity of the story reveals the triumph of Cheever's fictional art and his lyric vision, for both are finally inseparable."

Literary critic Patrick Meanor reports that Cheever "identified himself with those fellow writes whose lives ended prematurely because of their suicidal alcoholic excesses or their actual suicides." In 1966, Cheever listed some of these literary mentors in his journals. The elderly protagonist in "The World of Apples", Asa Bascomb, offers the same paean to his older contemporaries:

Bascomb got to his knees and said loudly: "God bliss Walt Whitman, God bless Hart Crane, God bless Dylan Thomas, God bless William Faulkner, Scott Fitzgerald, and especially Ernest Hemingway."

== Sources ==
- Bailey, Blake. 2008. Notes on Text in John Cheever: Collected Stories and Other Writing. The Library of America. pp. 1025-1028 ISBN 978-1-59853-034-6
- Coale, Samuel. 1977. John Cheever. Frederick Ungar Publishing Company, New York. ISBN 0-8044-6081-7
- Donaldson, Scott. 1988. John Cheever: A Biography. Random House, New York. ISBN 0-394-54921-X
- O'Hara, James E. 1989. John Cheever: A Study of the Short Fiction. Twayne Publishers, Boston Massachusetts. Twayne Studies in Short Fiction no 9. ISBN 0-8057-8310-5
- Meanor, Patrick. 1995. John Cheever Revisited. Twayne Publishers, New York. ISBN 0-8057-3999-8
- Waldeland, Lynne. 1979. John Cheever. Twayne Publishers, G. K. Hall & Co., Boston, Massachusetts. ISBN 0-8057-7251-0
