= Joe Jackson (writer) =

American author

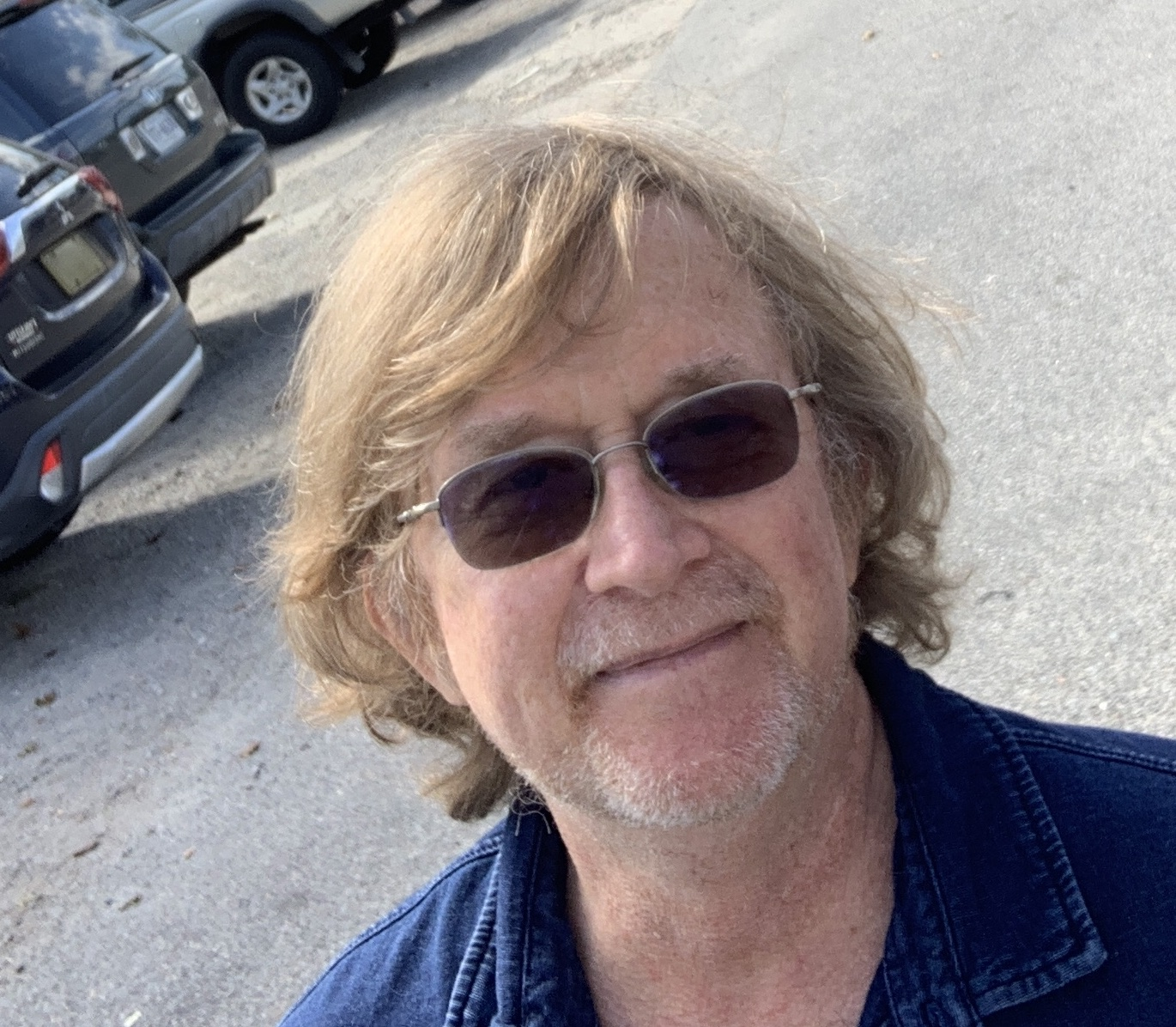
- Jackson in Virginia Beach in 2021
- Born: 1955 (age 70–71)
- Education: University of Arkansas (MFA)
- Occupations: Author, professor, journalist
- Website: joejacksonbooks.com

Joe Jackson (born 1955) is an American author of seven nonfiction books, including The Thief at the End of the World: Rubber, Power, and the Seeds of Empire, (a Time magazine Top Ten Books of 2008 selection) and Black Elk: The Life of an American Visionary, which was first published by Macmillan imprint Farrar, Straus and Giroux in 2016

His book Black Elk received multiple awards and acclaimed reviews, including the PEN/Jacqueline Bograd Weld Award for Biography and won the Society of American Historians' Francis Parkman Prize.

In 2016, Jackson was named the Mina Hohenberg Darden Professor of Creative Writing at Old Dominion University in Norfolk, Virginia. He was preceded by Philip Roth author Blake Bailey.

== Awards and honors ==
- Edgar Allan Poe Award for Best Fact Crime nomination for Leavenworth Train, 2002
- National Book Critics Circle Award for Biography nomination for Black Elk, 2016
- Francis Parkman Prize for Black Elk, 2017
- PEN/Jacqueline Bograd Weld Award for Biography for Black Elk, 2017

== Bibliography ==
Non-fiction books

- Dead Run: The Shocking Story of Dennis Stockton and Life on Death Row in America with William Burke Jr. (Canongate, 1999, ISBN 9780862419325; reprint: Times/Henry Holt, 1999, ISBN 0-8129-3206-4)
- Leavenworth Train: A Fugitive's Search for Justice in the Vanishing West (Basic Books, 2001, ISBN 9780786708970)
- A Furnace Afloat: The Wreck of the Hornet and the Harrowing 4,300-mile of its Survivors (Weidenfeld & Nicolson, 2003, ISBN 9780297846185; also Free Press, 2003, ISBN 0-7432-3037-X)
- A World on Fire: A Heretic, an Aristocrat, and the Race to Discover Oxygen (Viking, 2005, ISBN 0-670-03434-7)
- The Thief at the End of the World: Rubber, Power, and the Seeds of Empire (Viking, 2008, ISBN 9780670018536, ISBN 9781101202692 (e-book))
- Atlantic Fever: Lindbergh, His Competitors, and the Race to Cross the Atlantic (Farrar, Straus and Giroux, 2012, ISBN 978-0-374-10675-1)
- Black Elk: The Life of an American Visionary (Farrar, Straus and Giroux, 2016, ISBN 9780374253301)
- Splendid Liberators: Heroism, Betrayal, Resistance, and the Birth of American Empire (Farrar, Straus and Giroux, 2025, ISBN 978-0374191900)

Novels

- How I Left the Great State of Tennessee and Went on to Better Things (Carroll and Graf, 2004, ISBN 978-0-7867-1284-7
