= The Brothers (short story) =

- Short story by John Cheever
- Country: United States
- Language: English

Publication
- Published in: The Yale Review
- Publication date: June 1937

"The Brothers" is a short story by John Cheever which first appeared in The Yale Review in June 1937. The work was included in the short fiction collection The Way Some People Live (1943), published by Random House.

== Plot ==
Two brothers, Kenneth and Tom (their surname is never given), forge an intimate bond after the divorce of their parents. As boys, they witnessed the disintegration of the marriage, which they blamed largely on their mother. At the time of the separation, Kenneth was 20 years old, Tom age 17. The story opens four years later, during which the young men have lived together, becoming "deeply attached to one another." Despite their continual proximity, they display a tactfulness towards one another's casual affairs with women.

Since the divorce, the brothers routinely travel by car and ferry from Boston on Saturdays to visit the middle-aged Amy on the rural North Shore. A widow, she lives on a small, isolated farm with her attractive teen-age daughter, Jane. Amy is always cheered at the arrival of the young Bostonians. The men are on friendly, affectionate terms with both women.

Jane secretly favors Kenneth, and jealously resents his failure to lavish his attention solely upon her. After dancing in the parlor, the youngsters depart for Larssen's, a local restaurant and tavern. There they order a quart of applejack. Jane is increasingly ill at ease with the intimacy the brothers exhibit towards one another. In their self-absorbed discussions, they unconsciously exclude Jane from their discourse.

Upon leaving the tavern that night, Jane marches into the darkness. Tom sees her suddenly throw herself on the ground, where she begins calling desperately for Kenneth. She feigns a sprained ankle, but quickly forgets the injury when the trio arrive back at the house. On the sofa with Kenneth, Jane becomes animated. Tom announces that he is going upstairs to bed, discreetly leaving the couple. When Kenneth begins to follow Tom, Jane begs him to remain with her. Minutes later, Tom is joined by his brother upstairs. Kenneth begins to plan a winter skiing trip to Canada with Tom. The younger brother is noncommittal. Neither man mentions Jane.

The following morning Tom begins to reflect upon the nature of his relationship with Kenneth. Though his bond with his sibling remains secure, he is deeply troubled by Kenneth's utter indifference to Jane, and the suspicion that this insular fraternal relationship will inhibit healthy relationships with girls, or even with their futures.

When a young undergraduate, George, visits Amy for dinner, Jane briefly shifts her attention to him. Her fulsome flattery embarrasses both George and the rest of the company. When Jane asks Kenneth to dance with her, he declines, and returns to his discussion of rebuilding automobile engines with Tom. Desperate, she makes a final attempt to engage with Kenneth, inviting him for a walk. Kenneth, in turn, asks Tom if he would like to join them. Tom declines, and Kenneth rejects Jane's offer. When Jane directs a hateful glare towards Tom, he is mortified, but feels helpless to intervene on her behalf. Jane goes on a walk with George. When Kenneth and Tom depart that evening, they have not returned. The men bid farewell to Amy.

Tom realizes that his devotion to Kenneth is an emotional artifact forged by the suffering the boys had experienced by their parents' divorce. The relationship is inhibiting their personal development. He informs his brother that he is leaving to look for work out of state. Tom boards a train for New York the following night.

Kenneth returns to Amy's farm alone. He finds that Jane is indifferent to him. She is departing for Chicago to live with her aunt, Amy's sister. When questioned as to why Tom departed, he merely repeats his brother's explanation: to search for a job. Suffering acutely from the departure of his brother, Kenneth goes for a walk: "Now he felt the pain that Tom had brought down on both of them…He walked through the fields clutching involuntarily at the air, as if something were slipping from his grasp…"

== Critical assessment ==
"The Brothers" is among Cheever's earliest published works.

Literary critic Lynne Waldeland considers "The Brothers" "the most distinguished story in The Way Some People Live, the first of collections of Cheever's short fiction.

Critic Patrick Meanor ranks the work "the strongest" and among the most "artfully rendered stories in The Way Some People Live…"

== Theme ==
"The Brothers" is widely recognized as Cheever's most undisguised autobiographical work of short fiction. Biographer calls the piece "patently autobiographical", as does critic Patrick Meanor. The story is an examination of Cheever's very close and often difficult relationship with his older brother Frederick, who was almost seven years his senior.

The topic of fraternal relationships would appear in Cheever's fiction throughout his life; "The Brothers" is the first of these. Lynne Waldeland observes : "The interest in the question of power in relationships between men and women, has remained a major theme in Cheever's work…" Cheever's daughter, Susan Cheever Cowley, quoted her father in a 1977 Newsweek interview: "the strongest love — not the most exciting or the richest or the most brilliant — but the strongest love of my life was for my brother." Waldeland comments on the parallels between the story's brothers Kenneth and Tom, and Cheever's close and complex relationship with his older brother, Frederick Cheever Jr.:

The affirmative ending may grow out of Cheever's desire to understand why he had left the security of the relationship he had with his own brother…"The Brothers" has the character development lacking in others in [The Way Some People Live]. It gains a particular tension from the difference in what each brother perceives. It is a polished and effective work of fiction.

== Sources ==
- Bailey, Blake. 2009. Notes on Text in John Cheever: Collected Stories and Other Writing. The Library of America. Pp. 1025–1028 ISBN 978-1-59853-034-6
- Cheever, John. 2009. John Cheever: Collected Stories and Other Writing. The Library of America. ISBN 978-1-59853-034-6
- O'Hara, James E. 1989. John Cheever: A Study of the Short Fiction. Twayne Publishers, Boston Massachusetts. Twayne Studies in Short Fiction no 9. ISBN 0-8057-8310-5
- Meanor, Patrick. 1995. John Cheever Revisited. Twayne Publishers, New York. ISBN 0-8057-3999-8
- Waldeland, Lynne. 1979. John Cheever. Twayne Publishers, G. K. Hall & Company, Boston, Massachusetts. ISBN 0-8057-7251-0
