= Spies Like Us =

1985 film by John Landis

- Theatrical release poster by John Alvin
- Directed by: John Landis
- Screenplay by: Dan Aykroyd; Lowell Ganz; Babaloo Mandel
- Story by: Dan Aykroyd; Dave Thomas
- Produced by: George Folsey Jr.; Brian Grazer
- Starring: Chevy Chase; Dan Aykroyd; Steve Forrest; Donna Dixon; Bruce Davison; Bernie Casey; William Prince; Tom Hatten
- Cinematography: Robert Paynter
- Edited by: Malcolm Campbell
- Music by: Elmer Bernstein
- Production companies: Warner Bros.; AAR Films
- Distributed by: Warner Bros. (United States); Columbia–EMI–Warner Distributors (United Kingdom)
- Release dates: December 3, 1985 (Premiere); December 6, 1985 (United States); February 14, 1986 (United Kingdom)
- Running time: 109 minutes
- Country: United States
- Languages: English; Russian
- Budget: $22 million
- Box office: $77.3 million

Spies Like Us is a 1985 American spy comedy film directed by John Landis, and starring Chevy Chase, Dan Aykroyd, Steve Forrest and Donna Dixon. The film presents the comic adventures of Emmett Fitz-Hume and Austin Millbarge, two novice intelligence agents sent to the Soviet Union. Originally written by Aykroyd and Dave Thomas to star Aykroyd and John Belushi at Universal, the script went into turnaround following Belushi's 1982 death and was later picked up by Warner Bros. Pictures, starring Aykroyd and Chase.

Partly filmed on location near Sognefjord in Norway (as Soviet Union) and the Sahara (as Pakistan), the film is a homage to the Bob Hope and Bing Crosby Road to... film series. Hope himself cameos in one scene. Other cameos include directors Terry Gilliam, Sam Raimi, Costa-Gavras, Martin Brest, Frank Oz and Joel Coen, musician B. B. King, and visual effects pioneer Ray Harryhausen. Although contemporary reviews of the film were mixed, Spies Like Us was a financial success, grossing $77 million.

== Plot ==
Austin Millbarge is a code breaker dwelling in the dark basement at the Pentagon who aspires to escape his under-respected job to become a secret agent. Emmett Fitz-Hume, a wisecracking, pencil-pushing son of an envoy, takes the foreign service exam under peer pressure. Millbarge and Fitz-Hume meet during the test, on which Fitz-Hume openly cheats after his attempts to bribe his supervisor Alice and the test monitor in exchange for the answers both fail. Millbarge was not prepared to take the test, having had only one night to study after his supervisor deliberately withheld a two-weeks notice for the exam, leaving him vulnerable to fail and being forced to remain in the depths of the Pentagon.

Needing two expendable covert agents to act as decoys to draw attention away from a more capable team, Ruby and Keyes of the Defense Intelligence Agency (DIA) decide to enlist Fitz-Hume and Millbarge, promote them to GLG-20 Foreign Service Operatives, rush them through minimal military survival training and send them on an undefined mission inside Pakistan and Soviet Central Asia. Meanwhile, the two professional agents are well on their way to carry out the objective: the seizure of a mobile SS-50 ICBM launcher in Soviet territory. Jerry Hadley, a member of the main team is killed, while Millbarge and Fitz-Hume manage to escape multiple enemy attacks and eventually encounter Karen Boyer, the surviving operative from the main team.

In the Pamir Mountains of the Tajik Soviet Socialist Republic, the trio disguises themselves in hastily constructed extraterrestrial outfits and tranquilizes the mobile missile guard unit. Following orders in real-time from the intelligence agency (operating from the W.A.M.P. military bunker located deep under an abandoned drive-in theater in Nevada), they begin to utilize the launcher. At the end of their instructions, the vehicle launches the ICBM into space, targeting an unspecified area in the Continental United States. Thinking they have started a nuclear war, the American agents and their Soviet counterparts pair up to have sex before the world is destroyed.

Meanwhile, Ruby and Keyes have joined Generals Sline and Miegs, the two military commanders at W.A.M.P., in the operations bunker. They initiate the conversion of the drive-in theater to expose what is hidden under the screens and projection booth: a huge black-op SDI laser and collector/emitter screen. The purpose of sending the agents to launch a Soviet ICBM is exposed as a way to test the anti-ballistic missile system, but the laser malfunctions and fails to intercept the missile. Despite this, Sline and Miegs choose not to inform the President and the US Government that the missile launch was not a nuclear attack initiated by the Soviet Union, revealing to the horrified Ruby and Keyes a twisted contingency plan of letting the impending thermonuclear war commence to "preserve the American way of life".

Back in the Soviet Union, horrified at the thought of having launched a nuclear missile at their own country, Milbarge realizes that the missile can be diverted. The American spies and Soviet technicians quickly use Millbarge's knowledge of missile guidance systems to transmit instructions that deflect the missile off into space where it harmlessly detonates. Immediately after, the underground W.A.M.P. bunker is located and stormed by U.S. Army Rangers. Ruby, Keyes and the rogue military officials involved in the unauthorized covert operation are all arrested. Millbarge, Fitz-Hume and Boyer go on to become nuclear disarmament negotiators, playing a nuclear version of Risk-meets-Trivial Pursuit against their new Soviet friends.

== Cast ==
- Chevy Chase as Emmett Fitz-Hume
- Dan Aykroyd as Austin Millbarge
- Donna Dixon as Karen Boyer
- Bruce Davison as Ruby
- William Prince as Keyes
- Bernie Casey as Colonel Rhombus
- Steve Forrest as General Sline
- Tom Hatten as General Miegs
- Frank Oz as Test Monitor
- Charles McKeown as Jerry Hadley
- Terry Gilliam as Dr. Imhaus
- James Daughton as Bob Hodges
- Jim Staahl as Bud Schnelker
- Vanessa Angel, Svetlana Plotnikova, Bjarne Thomsen, Sergei Rousakov, and Garrick Dombrovski as Soviet Rocket Crew
- Costa-Gavras and Seva Novgorodtsev as Tadzhik Highway Patrol
- Stephen Hoye as Captain Hefling
- Ray Harryhausen as Dr. Marston

Other actors making appearances in minor roles include Jeff Harding as Fitz-Hume's state department colleague and Heidi Sorenson as Alice, Fitz-Hume's supervisor. Also making cameo appearances are special effects designer Derek Meddings as Dr. Stinson, directors Joel Coen, Sam Raimi and Martin Brest as the drive-in security, comedian Bob Hope as himself, musician B. B. King and directors Michael Apted and Larry Cohen as the Ace Tomato agents, and NBC newscaster Edwin Newman as himself.

== Soundtrack ==
The title song, "Spies Like Us", was written and performed by Paul McCartney. The recording peaked at #7 on the Billboard Hot 100 singles chart in the United States in early 1986. The song was McCartney's last to reach the top ten in the US until "FourFiveSeconds" with Rihanna and Kanye West in 2015. It also reached #13 on the UK singles chart. John Landis directed a music video for the song where Dan Aykroyd and Chevy Chase are seen in a recording studio, performing the song with McCartney (although they did not actually play on the record). Landis has stated that he feels "Spies Like Us" is "a terrible song", but he could not say no to McCartney and Warner Bros.

The film's score was composed by Elmer Bernstein and performed by the Graunke Symphony Orchestra, conducted by Bernstein. The soundtrack album was released by Varèse Sarabande; it does not contain the Paul McCartney song. The film also features "Soul Finger" by the Bar-Kays, also absent from the soundtrack. In an early scene, Emmett Fitz-Hume (Chase) watches Ronald Reagan, Virginia Mayo and Gene Nelson sing "I'll Still be Loving You" in the 1952 film musical She's Working Her Way Through College.

1. "The Ace Tomato Company" (5:06)
2. "Off to Spy" (1:52)
3. "Russians in the Desert" (2:21)
4. "Pass in the Tent" (2:58)
5. "Escape" (3:25)
6. "To the Bus" (3:14)
7. "The Road to Russia" (3:39)
8. "Rally 'Round" (2:39)
9. "W.A.M.P." (2:48)
10. "Martian Act" (3:08)
11. "Arrest" (2:21)
12. "Recall" (2:38)
13. "Winners" (1:16)

== Release ==
The film had its world premiere on December 3, 1985, for the Variety Club of Southern California and the Will Rogers Institute.

=== Box office ===
Spies Like Us grossed $8.6 million on its US opening weekend and ultimately grossed $60 million in the United States and Canada against a budget of $22 million. The film grossed $17.2 million overseas for a worldwide total of $77.3 million.

=== Critical reception ===
Washington Post critic Paul Attanasio called Spies Like Us "a comedy with exactly one laugh, and those among you given to Easter egg hunts may feel free to try and find it". Chicago Reader critic Dave Kehr condemned the character development, saying: "Landis never bothers to account for the friendship that springs up spontaneously between these two antipathetic types, but then he never bothers to account for anything in this loose progression of recycled Abbott and Costello riffs". The New York Times critic Janet Maslin wrote: "The stars are always affable, and they're worth watching even when they do very little, but it's painful to sit by as the screenplay runs out of steam."

Variety magazine opined in a staff review: "Spies is not very amusing. Though Chase and Aykroyd provide moments, the overall script thinly takes on eccentric espionage and nuclear madness, with nothing new to add." TV Guide published a staff review, stating: "Landis' direction is indulgent, to say the least, with big landscapes, big crashes, big hardware, and big gags filling the screen. What he forgets is character development, that all-important factor that must exist for comedy to work well." David Parkinson, writing for the Radio Times, felt that "Dan Aykroyd and Chevy Chase simply fail to gel, and there's little fun to be had once the boisterous training school gags are exhausted."

Review aggregation website Rotten Tomatoes shows a score of 35% based on 26 reviews and an average rating of 4.5/10. The site's consensus states: "Despite the comedic prowess of its director and two leads, Spies Like Us appears to disavow all knowledge of how to make the viewer laugh." Metacritic displays a score of 22 out of 100, based on 9 critics, indicating "generally unfavorable reviews". Writing for Common Sense Media, Andrea Beach called the film a "dated '80s comedy [with] strong language, few laughs". Collider staff writer Jeff Giles, reviewing the film's Blu-ray release, stated: "on the whole, it's more amusing than funny; it's only 102 minutes, but it feels too long by half. For all the talent involved, there's an awful lot of flab. It's the kind of movie you can walk away from for 10 minutes without missing anything important."

== Legacy ==
A plot point in the film is that funding for the covert operation came from deceiving Congress, who "thinks the funds are for more stealth bombers". On November 22, 1988, three years after the film's release, the first stealth bomber would be unveiled to the public.

Animated sitcom Family Guy paid tribute to the film with its 2009 eighth season episode "Spies Reminiscent of Us", which guest starred Aykroyd and Chase as fictionalized versions of themselves who, according to the series, were made real spies by Ronald Reagan after he saw the film. The episode recreates numerous scenes.

In 2013, the film was remembered for its depiction of the Afghan mujahideen. In the film, Aykroyd's character Austin Millbarge, surrounded by potentially-hostile armed locals, reassures his partner Fitz-Hume by explaining: "These are the Yusufzai. They're Afghani freedom fighters! They're our allies!" Turning to the locals, Fitz-Hume happily proclaims to the assembled soldiers "We're Americans!", only for the film to cut to a shot of the two American spies hanging upside down, about to be executed.
