= Philip Roth: The Biography =

2021 book by Blake Bailey

- First edition cover
- Author: Blake Bailey
- Audio read by: George Guidall
- Language: English
- Subject: Biography
- Publisher: W. W. Norton & Company
- Publication date: April 6, 2021
- Publication place: United States
- Media type: Print, e-book, audiobook
- Pages: 880
- ISBN: 978-0-393-24072-6 (hardcover)
- OCLC: 1155082654
- Dewey Decimal: 813/.54
- LC Class: PS3568.O855 Z55 2021

Philip Roth: The Biography is a 2021 book by biographer Blake Bailey. It is the authorized biography of American novelist Philip Roth (1933–2018). It was first published on April 6, 2021, by W. W. Norton & Company. Norton, however, later cancelled publication of the book following allegations of sexual misconduct against Bailey. Three weeks later, in May 2021, Skyhorse Publishing announced that it would release paperback, ebook, and audiobook versions of the biography.

== Contents ==
Prologue
Part One

- LAND HO! - 1933-1956

Part Two

- DON'T STEP ON THE UNDERDOG - 1956-1968

Part Three

- THE MORONIC INFERNO - 1968-1975

Part Four

- ENTERING A DOLL'S HOUSE - 1975-1995

Part Five

- AMERICAN MASTER - 1995-2006

Part Six

- NEMESES - 2006-2018
- EPILOGUE

== Background ==
In 2004, American novelist Philip Roth enlisted Ross Miller, a professor at the University of Connecticut and nephew of playwright Arthur Miller, to write an authorized biography of Roth. In 2009, however, they mutually agreed to abandon their arrangement. Roth and Miller, who were close friends, had a falling out over the direction in which the project was going. Roth reportedly began interfering in Miller's process, including manipulating his interviews.

Blake Bailey, an American writer from Oklahoma, previously published biographies of novelists Richard Yates, John Cheever, and Charles Jackson. After completing his biography of Jackson, Bailey approached Philip Roth in the spring of 2012. In June 2012, Roth and Bailey signed a collaboration agreement. The agreement granted Bailey unrestricted and exclusive access to the author's complete archives, including his unpublished works and personal correspondence. Roth, who was 79 years old at the time, made himself available for extensive interviews conducted by Bailey. Roth also assisted in encouraging friends and family to cooperate in the process. The deal was first reported in The New York Times on September 5, 2012. On September 28, 2012, it was reported that W. W. Norton & Company acquired the rights to the book. At the time, Bailey estimated that the biography would take him eight to ten years to finish writing.

Bailey spent years researching and organizing content for the book, writing a 35-page outline and envisioning each paragraph before the writing process. He officially started writing the book in December 2017. He referenced from a plethora of Roth's papers and Roth's donated materials at the Library of Congress. He was also given a 300-page chronology written by Roth and a copy of Roth's unpublished book Notes for My Biographer. Bailey also inherited Ross Miller's taped interviews; however, Miller would not respond to Bailey's communications. Bailey also referenced from his own interviews which he conducted with 150 people, in addition to the numerous interviews with Roth. He also had a very brief communication with Claire Bloom. In his first interviews with Roth, Bailey expressed his desire to maintain a professional relationship to not repeat the "disturbing" relationship he had with Ross Miller. Bailey demanded freedom to quote from Roth's documents, and that Roth and his team were not to edit his manuscript for any purposes except for factual accuracy. Although Roth at times attempted to sway the narrative in his own direction, Bailey "quietly" went his own way.

Roth died of congestive heart failure on May 22, 2018, at the age of 85.

== Publication ==
The book was published in the United States by W. W. Norton & Company on April 6, 2021, and in the United Kingdom by Jonathan Cape on April 8, 2021. An audiobook, narrated George Guidall, was released the same day by Recorded Books. The book debuted at number fifteen on The New York Times nonfiction best-seller list for the week ending April 10, 2021.

=== Cancellation ===
In April 2021, Bailey was dropped by his agency, the Story Factory, following allegations of sexual misconduct made in the comments section of a literary blog; Bailey denies the allegations. In a statement to the Associated Press on April 21 by W. W. Norton & Company, the publisher announced that it decided to pause the shipping and promotion of Philip Roth: The Biography "pending any further information that may emerge". On April 28, W. W. Norton announced that it is taking the book out of print. The same day, Recorded Books announced that it would be withdrawing the audiobook edition from release.

On May 17, 2021, Skyhorse Publishing announced that it would release a paperback, ebook, and audiobook versions of the biography. The e-book edition was published on May 26, 2021. The paperback version was published on June 29, 2021.

== Reception ==
=== Pre-allegation reviews ===
Initial reviews of for the biography were generally positive upon its release on April 6, 2021 before accusations appeared online alleging sexual misconduct by its author.

Alexander C. Kafka of The Washington Post praised the book for being "conversationally readable" despite its length, and wrote that "no one writing about Roth will be able to sidestep this foundational biography". In its starred review, Kirkus Reviews called it an "outstanding" biography, praising Bailey's "evenhanded" treatment of Roth's books and personal flaws. Publishers Weekly, in its starred review, praised Bailey's "consistently luminous, humorous prose" and called it "as dynamic and gripping as any of Roth's own fictions".

In an early negative review, Parul Sehgal of The New York Times felt the author failed his subject and called the book a "narrow portrait of a wide life". Sehgal criticized Bailey's "sprawling" focus on Roth's personal life and his reticence on Roth's literary work and style: "Roth's own writing was full of provocations on the art of biography, full of masks and veils and alter egos, obsessed with plucking apart the idea of a self. Bailey avoids it all, offering readings of the most tepid kind, primarily noticing biographical correspondences, most of them familiar by now."

Writing in the Los Angeles Review of Books, Steven G. Kellman called Bailey's work "a balanced, thorough account" of his subject.

[A]lthough Bailey's capacious book is an authorized—almost collaborative—biography, it is not hagiography. The biographer does not allow his admiration for the man he understandably calls ‘our greatest living novelist' to distort the comprehensive account…he has compiled."

Cynthia Ozick in The New York Times Book Review bestowed high praise on the biography, calling it "a narrative masterpiece."

=== Post-allegation reviews ===
Francine Prose in The Guardian noted that her initially favorable impression of the biography underwent a reassessment in light of the reports of sexual misconduct concerning Bailey. Prose notes in retrospect:

[E]ven as I tried to read it uncritically, for entertainment, certain sentences jumped out at me, details that seemed unnecessary, excessive, prurient or simply strange. The odd claim that childbirth had withered Roth's first wife's vagina; the suggestion that Roth was more excited about having dinner with Robert Penn Warren and Eleanor Clark, both important writers, when he learned that their daughter was home from Yale; the description of Roth's particular sexual acts with women mentioned by name…

Critic Alexandra Schwartz at The New Yorker faults W. W. Norton & Co. for neglecting to investigate a pseudonymous email charging author Bailey with rape in 2015. Schwartz termed this "a profound and sinister failure of accountability in the publishing world." As to the literary merits of the biography, Schwartz deplores Bailey's "obsessive cataloging" of Roth's sexual proclivities, and as such, exposing his subject to further charges of misogyny.

Bailey's prurient, exhaustively literal version of [Roth's] life…is sadly diminishing. What he never grasps is Roth the artist, with his powers of imagination, of expression, of language—what made him worthy of biography at all.

Critic Ruth Franklin writing in the New York Times, acknowledged that, though "there has been no investigation as yet into the allegations against Mr. Bailey," she questioned the capacity of male biographers to do justice to their male subjects: "Just as female critics have noticed instances of misogyny in Mr. Bailey's writing, a female biographer would likely have a more critical perspective on Mr. Roth's relationships with women." Bailey had previously written a review in the Wall Street Journal critical of Franklin's 2016 biography of author Shirley Jackson, accusing the author of feminist bias.

== Reactions to the cancellation ==
Writing in the New York Times, culture reporters Alexander Alter and Jennifer Schuessler noted that Norton's action reflects the influence of the #MeToo movement, eliciting "concern from free expression groups."

Authors Guild submitted a protest to the book's cancellation: "Freedom of expression and the freedom to publish are the bedrock principles upon which literary culture and civil society are built. Removing a published book from circulation because of the authors' conduct and resulting adverse public opinion against the author or the subject, no matter how strong and justified, contradicts important principles of free speech and open discourse."

PEN America's chief executive Suzanne Nossel issued a statement on the cancellation, questioning Norton's cancellation: "We are concerned about a precedent whereby even egregious misdeeds by an author result in a book being withdrawn, and potentially taken off limits for readers" but cautioning that a distinction be made between the merits of a literary work and its author.

Bringing out a book should signify that a publisher believes there is something edifying, worthwhile or elucidating contained in the volume. It should not be construed as an endorsement of the ideas or narrative purveyed, nor of the personal conduct of the author.

On April 22, 2021, the National Coalition Against Censorship (NCAC) registered objections to Norton's "pause" in distribution of the biography, declaring "books must be judged on their content."

The ongoing cultural reckoning of what to do with the art of morally-compromised artists is a complicated one. Erasure and silencing can gratify the desire to punish, but it does so at the cost of constraining the circulation of ideas. People who reject Blake Bailey's work are free to do so. Others will want to read it whether or not he is guilty of the allegations against him. Readers deserve the right to make this choice for themselves.

Short-story writer James Morrison, film historian Max Alvarez, author and blogger Kathleen Spaltro, biographer Joseph McBride, and film critic Jonathan Rosenbaum each penned objections to the book's censorship in the World Socialist Web Site.

== Sources ==
- Alter, Alexander; Schuessler, Jennifer. 2021. "Norton Takes Philip Roth Biography Out of Print". New York Times, April 27, 2021.https://www.nytimes.com/2021/04/27/books/norton-philip-roth-biography-blake-bailey.html Accessed 01 September, 2026.
- Bailey, Blake. 2016. "Life Among the Savages." Wall Street Journal, September 23, 2016.https://www.wsj.com/articles/life-among-the-savages-1474662721 Accessed 04 September, 2026.
- Bailey, Blake. 2021. Philip Roth: The Biography. W. W. Norton & Company, New York. ISBN 978-0-393-24072-6. OCLC 1155082654
- Kellman, Steven G.. 2021. "On Lives and Counterlives." Los Angeles Review of Books, April 8, 2021.https://lareviewofbooks.org/article/on-lives-and-counterlives/ Access 31 August, 2026.
- Franklin, Ruth. 2021. "What We Lose When Only Men Write About Men" [print edition: "Literary Biography's Man Problem"]. New York Times, May 1, 2012. https://www.nytimes.com/2021/04/30/opinion/biography-roth-bailey-sexual-assault-metoo-literature.html Accessed 02 September, 2026
- Nossel, Suzanne. 2021. "PEN America Responds to Decision to Take Philip Roth Biography Out of Print." PEN America, April 27, 2021. https://pen.org/press-release/pen-america-responds-to-decision-to-take-philip-roth-biography-out-of-print/ Accessed 01 September, 2026.
- Ozick, Cynthia. 2021. ‘Cynthia Ozick Calls the New Philip Roth Biography a ‘Narrative Masterwork' New York Times, April 1, 2021. https://www.nytimes.com/2021/04/01/books/review/philip-roth-the-biography-blake-bailey.html Accessed 01 September, 2026.
- Prose, Francine. 2021. "NCAC Statement on Publisher's ‘Pause' on Blake Bailey Book | UPDATED." The Guardian, April 25, 2021.https://www.theguardian.com/commentisfree/2021/apr/25/philip-roth-blake-bailey-all-too-perfect-match Accessed 01 September, 2026.
- Schwartz, Alexandra. 2021. "Blake Bailey, Philip Roth, and the Biography That Blew Up" The New Yorker, April 23, 2021.https://www.newyorker.com/culture/cultural-comment/blake-bailey-philip-roth-and-the-biography-that-backfired Accessed 02 September, 2026.
- Walsh, David. 2018. "Book Burning Comes to America." World Socialist Web Site, April 28, 2021.https://www.wsws.org/en/articles/2021/04/29/bail-a29.html Accessed 03 September, 2026.
- Walsh, David. 2021. "Writers, biographers protest W.W. Norton's decision to "permanently" remove Blake Bailey's biography of Philip Roth from print" World Socialist Web Site, May 4, 2021. https://www.wsws.org/en/articles/2021/05/04/bail-m04.html Accessed 31 August, 2026.
