= The Lost Weekend (novel) =

1944 novel by Charles R. Jackson

- First edition
- Author: Charles R. Jackson
- Language: English
- Genre: Novel
- Publisher: Farrar & Rinehart
- Publication date: 1944
- Publication place: United States
- Media type: Print (hardback & paperback)
- Pages: 244 pp

The Lost Weekend is Charles R. Jackson's first novel, published by Farrar & Rinehart in 1944. The story of a talented but alcoholic writer was praised for its powerful realism, closely reflecting the author’s own experience of alcoholism, from which he was temporarily cured. It served as the basis for the classic 1945 Oscar winning film adaptation.

== Synopsis ==
Set in a rundown neighborhood of Manhattan in 1936, the novel explores a five-day alcoholic binge. Don Birnam, a binge drinker mostly of rye, fancies himself as a writer. He lapses into foreign phrases and quotes Shakespeare even while attempting to steal a woman's purse, trying to pawn a typewriter for drinking money, and smashing his face on a banister. That accident gets him checked into an "alcoholic ward". There, a counselor advises Birnam on the nature of alcoholism:

There isn't any cure, besides just stopping. And how many of them can do that? They don't want to, you see. When they feel bad like this fellow here, they think they want to stop, but they don't, really. They can't bring themselves to admit they're alcoholics, or that liquor's got them licked. They believe they can take it or leave it alone – so they take it. If they do stop, out of fear or whatever, they go at once into such a state of euphoria and well-being that they become over-confident. They're rid of drink, and feel sure enough of themselves to be able to start again, promising they'll take one, or at the most two, and – well, then it becomes the same old story over again.

Perhaps the only thing keeping Birnam from drinking himself to death is his girlfriend Helen, a selfless and incorruptible woman who tolerates his behavior out of love. Helen does, however, upbraid him with the words: "I haven't got time to be neurotic." No sooner has he begun to recover from his "Lost Weekend" than he contemplates killing Helen's maid to get the key to the liquor cabinet.

He has a few drinks and crawls into bed wondering, "Why did they make such a fuss?"

== Reception and critical analysis ==
1948 Signet paperback edition

The book was a best-seller and received rave reviews. Philip Wylie wrote in the New York Times Book Review that "Charles Jackson has made the most compelling gift to the literature of addiction since De Quincey. His character is a masterpiece of psychological precision." Sinclair Lewis called it "the only unflinching story of an alcoholic that I have ever read". Anthony Slide, a modern editor, notes the work is obviously semi-autobiographical

It is sometimes seen as the seminal addiction memoir in American literature, a precursor to such works as Augusten Burroughs' Dry or David Carr's The Night of the Gun. Malcolm Lowry, who had been working for more than 10 years on the novel that appeared as Under the Volcano in 1947, resented Jackson's success with The Lost Weekend, especially Jackson's use of an alcoholic to represent the modern man's condition.

The book has also been noted for having homosexual overtones with a strong implication that Don Birnam, just like Charles Jackson, is bisexual.

== Film adaptation ==
The book was adapted into a 1945 film directed by Billy Wilder featuring Ray Milland as Don Birnam. The film was critically acclaimed, winning the Oscar for Best Picture and the Cannes Grand Prix. Ray Milland's portrayal of Birnam won him the Academy Award for Best Actor.

Although the film adaptation adheres closely to the novel, the film's ending is more optimistic, and the homosexual incident in college that Birnam is described in the novel as being tormented by is omitted from the film.
