= The Sunnier Side: Twelve Arcadian Tales =

- First edition
- Publisher: Farrar, Straus and Giroux
- Publication date: April 13, 1950
- Media type: Print (hardback)
- Pages: 311
- ISBN: 9780836938913
- OCLC: 8021392

The Sunnier Side: Twelve Arcadian Tales is a collection of short fiction by Charles R. Jackson first published in 1950 by Farrar, Straus and Giroux.

The stories are semi-autobiographical literary renderings of Jackson’s childhood and youth growing up in northwestern New York State during the early decades of the 20th century.

== Stories ==
Stories originally appearing in periodicals are indicated:

- “The Sunnier Side” ( Cosmopolitan, Vol. 128 No. 3, March 1950)
- “ The Band Concert”
- “Palm Sunday” (Partisan Review, 1939 )
- “The Sisters”
- “In the Chair”
- “Tenting Tonight” (Good Housekeeping, May 1949)
- “The Benighted Savage”
- “How War Came to Arcadia, N. Y.”
- “By the Sea”
- “A Night Visitor” ( Mademoiselle, June 1944)
- "Rachel's Summer (Partisan Review (Fall 1939)
- “Sophistication”

== Background ==
The setting for the stories in The Sunnier Side is the fictional village of Arcadia. Jackson appropriated the name from the commercial district—“Arcadia Township”—encompassed by the town of Newark, New York in which he grew up. This fictional “ Arcadia” is the setting for much of his autobiographical short fiction.

In eight of these twelve tales, the focal character is Don Birnam, Jackson’s “alter ego and fictional surrogate” who narrates events from a first-person point-of-view. Indeed, the boy Birnam’s birthdate is identical to that of the author (October 6, 1903), and the configuration of Birnam’s siblings nearly matches the birth order of those Jackson’s—only the names are changed.

Biographer and literary critic John W. Crowley writes: “Many of Don’s childhood experiences, moreover, match Jackson’s; and as the title story suggests, most of the other characters were modeled more or less closely on Newark friends and neighbors.” Crowley adds that the term “Sunnier Side” in the title serves to distinguish these tales from the more lurid aspects of the novels with which Jackson had come to be identified by his readers. The collection “despite its own darker side” provides the reader with “the relatively sunnier side of its author.”

Literary critic Mark Connelly emphasizes that Jackson “was painfully aware that critics had typecast him as a Freudian writer of psychological " problem novels", as explorer of ‘untidy closets.’”

=== Publishing history and content revisions ===
March 1950 issue of Cosmopolitan, "The Sunnier Side" featured fiction.

The Sunnier Side: Twelve Arcadia Stories was first released on April 13, 1950.

Jackson’s agent Carl Brandt had suggested that the collection could be “published as a thematically unified novel” to which the author declined.

A paperback edition was published in 1958 by Zenith Books and retitled The Sisters. Biographer Blake Bailey describes the cover art as suggesting “genteel pornography.” In 1977, the copyright for the collection was renewed by Jackson’s widow, Rhoda Booth Jackson.

In 1995, literary critic John W. Crowley edited a 1995 publication for Syracuse University Press. The contents were changed: two stories, “The Sisters” and “In the Chair” were dropped, and “The Break,” also set in Jackson’s Arcadia was inserted, as was a non-Arcadian tale “The Boy Who Ran Away.”

A Vintage Press edition was published in 2013 with an introduction by editor and biographer Blake Bailey. Bailey, like Crowley, has revised the contents: “In the Chair” and “By the Sea” from the 1950 version were omitted, as is “The Sisters.” Replacing these are two stories that would later appear in Jackson’s 1953 collection Earthly Creatures: “The Break” and “The Boy Who Ran Away.”

== Reception ==
The collection enjoyed an “overwhelmingly positive” critical response: Of fifty-seven reviews examined by New York Times Book Review, only five panned it while fourteen offered measured approval; thirty-eight registered fulsome praise.

New York Times critic Charles Poore takes issue with the volume’s title, stressing that Jackson has done little to soften the treatment of his subject matter. Though “skillfully and penetratingly written…the seamier side appears early, late and often to the hero-as-narrator as he remembers the shocks and the pleasures and the scandals of Arcadia…” Poore adds: “[T]heir wrought irony shows only fitfully the splendor of the sun.”

The New York Times Book Review in May 28, 1950 wrote:

In their compassionate but merciless self-examination, their almost unbearable integrity, their penetrating (unarty) artfulness, [Jackson’s stories] force the reader back upon himself, make him reflect upon his own motivations, his own worth.”

== Literary influences ==
John W. Crowley identifies the “Arcadia” stories as literary descendants of several American writers, among these Ernest Hemingway, Mary McCarthy and Katherine Anne Porter.

Sherwood Anderson’s Winesburg, Ohio (1919) was especially influential in Jackson’s modelling of his focal character, Don Birnam.

Blake Bailey surmises that Jackson crafted The Sunnier Side as a “deliberate homage” to Anderson’s 1919 short story cycle. Notably, the protagonists—Jackson’s Don Birnam and Anderson’s George Willard—follow similar trajectories toward self-awareness. Bailey writes:

Like Winesburg, Ohio, Jackson’s book follows the progress of a particular character, keenly self-conscious, who observes, judges, and is victimized by the repressive hypocrisy of small-town America. In both cases too, there’s a kind of tortured ambivalence—nostalgia for the pastoral loveliness of the heroes native land, the place where he was young, and sympathy for its more “grotesque” inhabitants, stunted by a paranoiac, insular society.

== Theme ==
1958 Zenith Books paperback edition

Jackson’s “unifying theme” emerges from an examination of his experiences of adolescence in the small town of Arcadia, characterised by restrictive social norms. In these “accounts of adolescent discovery and disillusionment," Jackson presents an assessment of community and its social dynamics.

The single most damning indictment of Arcadia is revealed through Jackson “complex understanding of small-town narrowness, especially its hypocritical attitude towards all things sexual.” According to Crowley, Jackson makes this explicit in the following passage:

“Pretend it isn’t so” was always Arcadia’s attitude when trouble was brewing. As long as you pretended it wasn’t so, anything could be going on and it was all right. Which I suppose is a fairly adequate substitute for what Arcadia really thinks it is: tolerance.”

Despite the “devastating consequences” that this conformism could have on individuals, Crowley writes:

The Arcadian Tales have bite, but they are not bitter. Like Sherwood Anderson, in his underlying sympathy for the “grotesques” of Winesburg, Jackson ultimately tempers his unblinking exposure of Arcadia’s meanness with a generosity of spirit.

Biographer Bailey provides this endorsement of the collection: “What should become clear, in reading these stories, is that Jackson was the kindest of men, and his good-natured acceptance of human frailty (save his own, perhaps) is manifest everywhere in these pages.”

== Sources ==
- Bailey, Blake. 2013 (1). Farther and Wilder: The Lost Weekends and Literary Dreams of Charles Jackson. Alfred A. Knopf, New York. ISBN 978-0-307-27358-1
- Bailey, Blake. 2013 (2). Introduction: The Sunnier Side and Other Stories. pp. xiii-xxiii. Vintage Books, New York. ISBN 978-0-307-94872-4
- Connelly, Mark. 2001. Deadly Closets: The Fiction of Charles Jackson. University Press of America, Lanham, New York, Oxford. ISBN 0-7618-1912-6
- Crowley, John W. 2011. The Dark Side of Charles Jackson’s Sunnier Side. American Literary Realism, Vol. 43, No. 3 (Spring 2011), pp. 259-278. https://www.jstor.org/stable/10.5406/amerlitereal.43.3.0259?seq=1 Accessed 30 May, 2025.
- Jackson, Charles R.. 2013. The Sunnier Side and Other Stories. Introduction by Blake Bailey. Vintage Books, New York. ISBN 978-0-307-94872-4
- Poore, Charles. 1950. Books of the Times; His Correspondent Very Helpful A Classic by Thurber and White. New York Times Book Review, April 13, 1950. https://www.nytimes.com/1950/04/13/archives/books-of-the-times-his-correspondent-very-helpful-a-classic-by.html Accessed 01 June 2025.
