= The Way Some People Live =

Short fiction collection by John Cheever

- First edition cover
- Author: John Cheever
- Language: English
- Publisher: Random House
- Publication date: 1943
- Publication place: United States
- Media type: Print (hardcover)
- Pages: 256
- OCLC: 1491957
- Dewey Decimal: 813/.52
- LC Class: PZ3.C3983 Way

The Way Some People Live is a collection of 30 works of short fiction by John Cheever, published in 1943 by Random House.

The stories in this edition, represents most of Cheever's literary output written in his twenties. While Cheever resisted reissuing these works in a collection, a number of the stories whose copyrights have elapsed were issued by Academy Chicago Publishers in Fall River and Other Collection Stories (1994).

== Stories ==
The thirty works of short fiction included in The Way Some People Live were originally published individually in literary journals, among them The New Yorker, The Yale Review and Story.:

"Summer Theatre" (The New Yorker, August 24, 1940)

"Forever Hold Your Piece" (The New Yorker, November 23, 1940)
"Of Love: A Testimony" (Story, December 1935)
"The Brothers" (Yale Review, June 1937)
"Publick House" (The New Yorker, August 16, 1941)
"When Grandmother Goes" (The New Yorker, December 14, 1940)
"These Tragic Years" (The New Yorker, September 27, 1941)
"In the Eyes of God"
"The Pleasures of Solitude"
"Cat"
"Summer Remembered"
"The Edge of the World"
"Happy Birthday, Enid"
"Goodby, Broadway- Hello, Hello"
"Hello, Dear"
"Run, Sheep, Run"
"The Law of the Jungle"
"North of Portland"
"Washington Boarding House"
"Riding Stable"
"Survivor"
"There They Go"
"The Shape of a Night"
"A Border Incident"
"The New World"
"The Peril in the Streets"
"The Sorcerer's Balm"
"The Man Who Was Very Homesick for New York"
"Tomorrow is a Beautiful Day"

"Problem No. 4"

== Publishing background ==
The thirty short stories selected for publication in The Way Some People Live are a sampling of the more than 40 short stories Cheever wrote between 1930 and 1943. These depression-era works appeared in a number of literary journals, including Collier's, The New Republic, The Yale Review, Story and The New Yorker.

“With few exceptions, the stories Cheever published between 1935 and early 1942 are coldly detached in tone, as the teller were curious about the characters and their problems— but nothing more. They are essentially naturalistic reports on biological specimens responding to various stimuli, rather than stories about people by someone with a human interest in their human spirits…”— Literary critic James E. O’Hara in John Cheever: A Study of the Short Fiction (1989).

The volume was published in 1943 by Random House under the auspices of its co-founder Bennett Cerf, while Cheever was serving in a US infantry unit. When The Way Some People Live appeared in print, it came to the attention of his superior officers, and Cheever, a private first class, was transferred to the Signal Corps in Astoria, Queens, to write "scripts for antifascist propaganda films." Cheever's former combat unit, were deployed to North Africa and later to European theater, suffering extremely high casualty rates.

Biographer Blake Bailey reports the volume was "published in a first printing of 2,750 copies, The Way Some People Live sold just under 2000 copies at full price."

Cheever persistently resisted efforts to reissue selections from The Way Some People Live in subsequent collections of his work, describing these early efforts as "embarrassingly immature."

Despite Cheever's aversion to these stories, biographer Patrick Meanor considers several of the works "masterpieces."

== Reception ==
The Way Some People Live received measured approval among critics upon its release. The Saturday Review's Struthers Burt recognized Cheever as a rising literary talent, while Weldon Kees in The New Republic cautioned the author to avoid formulaic writing which a number of critics deemed typical of The New Yorker short fiction writers.

== Critical assessment ==
Biographer Patrick Meanor comments on the style, subject matter and themes that characterize these "vignettes" comprising The Way Some People Live.:

"The prevailing style of these stories is lean, tight and vivid, [presenting] poverty, sexual repression, alcoholic loss of control, and most of all, loneliness. The range of technical developments is as rich and various as the thematic concerns. As these stories emerge, we can clearly observe Cheever refining his technical apparatus…These stylistic elements accumulate into the bedrock of his early style.

Biographer Lynne Waldeland considers The Way Some People Live "a respectable volume for a writer's first collected fiction [that] would soon be overshadowed by the stories which were published in his next book, The Enormous Radio and Other Stories.(1953)."

== Sources ==
- Bailey, Blake. 2009 (1). Notes on Text in John Cheever: Collected Stories and Other Writing. The Library of America. Pp. 1025-1028 ISBN 978-1-59853-034-6
- Bailey, Blake. 2009 (2). Cheever: A Life. Alfred A. Knopf, New York. 770 pp. ISBN 978-1-4000-4394-1
- O'Hara, James E. 1989. John Cheever: A Study of the Short Fiction. Twayne Publishers, Boston Massachusetts. Twayne Studies in Short Fiction no 9. ISBN 0-8057-8310-5
- Meanor, Patrick. 1995. John Cheever Revisited. Twayne Publishers, New York. ISBN 0-8057-3999-8
- Waldeland, Lynne. 1979. John Cheever. Twayne Publishers, G. K. Hall & Company, Boston, Massachusetts. ISBN 0-8057-7251-0
