= The Fourth Alarm (short story) =

- Short story by John Cheever
- Country: United States
- Language: English

Publication
- Published in: Esquire
- Publication date: April 1970

"The Fourth Alarm" is a work of short fiction by John Cheever which first appeared in Esquire magazine in April 1970. The story was collected in The World of Apples, published in 1973 by Alfred A. Knopf.

== Plot ==
The story is written from a first-person perspective. The male narrator is an upper-middle class suburbanite, married to Bertha. A housekeeper prepares the family meals and supervises the couple's two young children. The story opens with the narrator relaxing on Sunday morning, suffering from ennui. His wife is away, and his mistress is unavailable. A serious schism has developed between the married couple, and he is slowly dosing himself with gin. Bertha largely abstains from alcohol. The narrator characterizes her as a dominatrix.

Bertha is away in the city, acting in a theater troupe that performs in the nude. Bertha was hired solely because of her lovely figure. The production, entitled Ozymandias, includes scenes mimicking sexual intercourse, both with the cast and the audience. Bertha has recently informed her husband about this new avocation. She rejoices that her public nakedness has, she feels, liberated her as a woman.

The narrator is thrust into an existential crisis by what appears to him the irredeemable loss of intimacy with his wife. Bertha rejects his demand for a divorce, and the narrator discovers through his attorney that, under New York State statutes, he has no grounds for a legal separation.

The narrator attends one of the performances of Ozymandias. During the show, he experiences a sharp nostalgia for a silent film era picture he had been obsessed with as a child, entitled The Fourth Alarm. The movie dramatizes the transition from the horse-drawn fire engines of the late 19th century to motorized fire trucks of the early 20th century. The now condemned teams of draft animals are gradually sold to factories where they are slaughtered. Only a single team of horses remains when a huge conflagration threatens to destroy the city. When the "fourth alarm" signals the mobilization of the equine team, they charge into action, and the courageous firefighters suppress the blaze single-handedly. The city mayor confers amnesty on the condemned horses. The narrator emerges from these reveries to see a stage performer "writing something obscene" on his wife's buttocks.

When the audience is encouraged to disrobe and join the cast on stage, the narrator strips off his clothes. Anxious about leaving his cash-filled wallet, watch and car keys unattended, he carries them in his hands as he advances towards the stage. The actors, including his wife, spot the narrator, and begin to chant "Put down your lendings! Put down your lendings!" The narrator experiences a surge of memories conjuring up humiliations he endured in his lifetime. Despite this, he realizes that to throw off these personal artifacts would be to abandon his very "essence", and declines to do so. As he dons his clothing and departs the theater in a snowstorm, he reflects with satisfaction that his automobile has been recently equipped with a new set of snow tires.

== Critical assessment ==
"There I sat in front of these strangers and felt for the first time in my life I'd found myself. I found myself in nakedness. I felt like a new woman, a better woman. To be naked and unashamed in front of strangers was one of the most exciting experiences I'd ever had." - From "The Fourth Alarm" quoted by literary critic Lynne Waldeland (1979)

James E. O'Hara ranks "The Fourth Alarm" among the "more conventional" of Cheever's late short fiction. O'Hara writes:

[These stories] are disturbingly misogynistic and sometimes lapse into medium-core pornography...obscene daydreams [that] Cheever had earlier tried to avoid. The temper of the times was increasingly pessimistic, and he may have felt that changing his approach to sexuality was not only justified but necessary...his forays into this strange new world lack authority, and in their awkwardness tend to confirm the wisdom of his earlier reticence.

== Theme ==
"The Fourth Alarm" is a humorous examination of the clash between the nostalgia for youthful innocence and conventional love, as opposed to the 1960s sexual revolution, in particular its challenge to monogamous relationships. Lynne Waldeland writes:

The idea that the past can help us maintain our capacity for love, humor and serenity - all major values in Cheever's work - is not new, but the suggestion that the Sixties fascination with public sexuality may be a way to expunge the past is.

Waldeland adds: "The story captures the dislocation of values precipitated by the alleged sexual revolution of the 1960s."

Despite appearing as moral dichotomies, Cheever suggests that, in the realm of sexual conduct, Puritanism and sexual liberation, are equally shackled by doctrinal systems.

== Sources ==
- Bailey, Blake. 2008. Notes on Text in John Cheever: Collected Stories and Other Writing. The Library of America. pp. 1025-1028 ISBN 978-1-59853-034-6
- O'Hara, James E. 1989. John Cheever: A Study of the Short Fiction. Twayne Publishers, Boston Massachusetts. Twayne Studies in Short Fiction no 9. ISBN 0-8057-8310-5
- Waldeland, Lynne. 1979. John Cheever. Twayne Publishers, G. K. Hall & Co., Boston, Massachusetts. ISBN 0-8057-7251-0
