= Charles R. Jackson =

American writer (1903–1968)

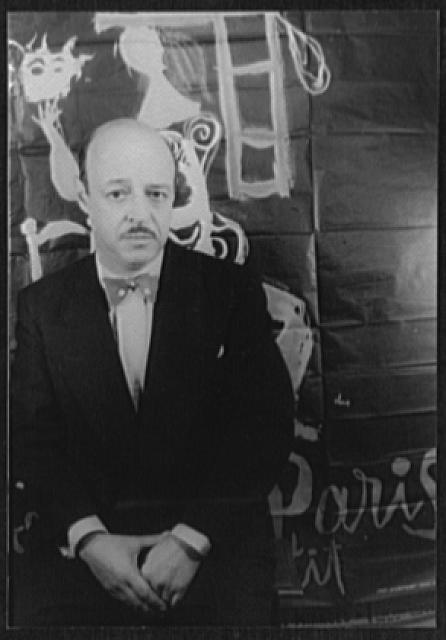
- Charles Jackson (1950); Photo by Carl Van Vechten
- Born: Charles Reginald Jackson; April 6, 1903; Summit, New Jersey, U.S.
- Died: September 21, 1968 (aged 65); New York City, New York, U.S.
- Resting place: East Newark Cemetery, Newark, Wayne County, New York, U.S.
- Education: Newark High School, New York
- Occupations: Novelist, radio and television writer
- Spouse: Rhoda Copland Booth (m. 1938)
- Children: 2
- Writing career
- Genre: Fictional prose
- Notable work: The Lost Weekend

Charles Reginald Jackson (April 6, 1903 – September 21, 1968) was an American writer. He wrote the 1944 novel The Lost Weekend.

== Early life ==
Charles R. Jackson was born in Summit, New Jersey on April 6, 1903, the son of Frederick George and Sarah Williams Jackson. His family moved to Newark, New York in 1907, and nine years later his older sister, Thelma, and younger brother, Richard, were killed while riding in a car that was struck by an express train. He graduated from Newark High School in 1921. He attended Syracuse University, joining a fraternity there, but left during his freshman year after a "furtive sexual encounter with a fellow member of his fraternity, who then spread word of the incident in such a way that only Jackson came in for public disgrace"; a fictionalized version of that experience was later incorporated into The Lost Weekend.

As a young man, he worked as an editor for local newspapers and in various bookstores in Chicago and New York prior to falling ill with tuberculosis. From 1927 to 1931, Jackson was confined to sanatoriums and eventually recovered in Davos, Switzerland. His battle with tuberculosis cost him a lung and served as a catalyst for his alcoholism.

== Career ==
He returned to New York at the height of the Great Depression and his difficulty in finding work spurred on his binge drinking. His battle to stop drinking started in late 1936 and was largely won by 1938. On March 4, 1938, Jackson married magazine writer Rhoda Booth. They later had two daughters, Sarah (born 1940) and Kate (born 1943).

During this time he was a free-lance writer and wrote radio scripts. Jackson's first published story, "Palm Sunday", appeared in the Partisan Review in 1939. It focused on the debauched organist of a church the narrators attended as children.

In the 1940s, Jackson wrote a trio of novels, beginning with The Lost Weekend published by Farrar & Rinehart in 1944. The autobiographical novel chronicled a struggling writer's five-day drinking binge. It earned Jackson lasting recognition. While working on The Lost Weekend, Jackson earned as much as $1000 per week writing scripts for the radio soap opera Sweet River, about a widowed minister and his two sons.

In 1945, Paramount Pictures paid $35,000 (about $611,000 in 2024) for the rights to adapt The Lost Weekend into the film version of the same name. The Academy Award winning film was directed by Billy Wilder and starred Ray Milland in the lead role of Don Birnam. At the height of his career, Charles R. Jackson lectured at various colleges. A radio play, "A Letter from Home", was performed on the Columbia Playhouse and broadcast on March 20, 1939, as part of the Columbia Workshop program.

Jackson's second published novel of the 1940s, titled The Fall of Valor, was released in 1946 and takes its name from a passage in Herman Melville's Moby-Dick. Set in 1943, it detailed a professor's obsession with a young, handsome Marine. The Fall of Valor received mixed reviews, and, though sales were respectable, was considerably less successful than Jackson's famous first novel. Jackson's The Outer Edges was released in 1948 and dealt with the gruesome rape and murder of two girls in Westchester County, New York. The Outer Edges also received mixed reviews, and sales were poor relative to his previous novels. Jackson's later works included two collections of short stories, The Sunnier Side: Twelve Arcadian Tales (1950) and Earthly Creatures (1953).

He adapted Evelyn Waugh's short story "The Man Who Liked Dickens" for the General Electric Theater program as "High Green Wall". The episode starred Joseph Cotten and Thomas Gomez in 1954. Naked City adapted his short story for the episode "The Other Face of Goodness" in 1958 about a serial killer, starring James Franciscus and John McIntire.

== Later years ==
Throughout his career, Jackson continued to struggle with an addiction to alcohol and pills. Over the years, he underwent psychoanalysis to help him kick his addictions. After the success of The Lost Weekend, Jackson began taking pills (mainly the sedative Seconal) and drinking again. He later told his wife that unless he was under the influence of Seconal, he would suffer from writer's block and become depressed.

In September 1952, he attempted suicide and was committed to Bellevue Hospital. He was readmitted four months later after suffering a nervous breakdown. After his release, he went on an alcohol and paraldehyde binge, during which he wrote six short stories and began writing A Second-Hand Life. In 1953, he checked into an alcoholism clinic and joined Alcoholics Anonymous (AA). Jackson later also spoke about alcoholism to large groups, sharing his experience. A recording of his talk in Cleveland, Ohio in May 1959 is still distributed in the AA community. He was the first speaker in Alcoholics Anonymous to address drug dependence (barbiturates and paraldehyde) openly as part of his story.

By the mid-1950s, Jackson was sober but was no longer writing. As a result, he and his family began struggling financially. He and his wife had to sell their New Hampshire home and eventually moved to Sandy Hook, Connecticut. Jackson's wife got a job at the Yale Center of Alcohol Studies while Jackson moved to New York City, where he rented an apartment at The Dakota. He continued to attend Alcoholics Anonymous meetings and attempted to begin writing again. In the early 1960s, three of his short stories appeared in McCall's magazine, but Jackson still struggled with periodic bouts of writer's block. He later worked as a story editor for the anthology television series Kraft Television Theatre and got a job teaching writing at Rutgers University.

A long-time heavy smoker, Jackson suffered from chronic obstructive pulmonary disease. Towards the end of his life, he was admitted to the Will Rogers Memorial Hospital in Saranac Lake, New York, after a relapse of tuberculosis. Will Rogers Institute even filmed a short theatrical release called "Place in the Country" about his second visit to the Will Rogers Memorial Hospital. After his release, Macmillan Publishers gave him an advance for a new book. Jackson moved to the Hotel Chelsea and resumed work on A Second-Hand Life, a novel that he began writing some 15 years earlier. Upon its release, the book received mediocre reviews but sold well.

== Death ==
On September 21, 1968, Jackson died of barbiturate poisoning at St. Vincent's Hospital in New York City. His death was ruled a suicide. At the time of his death, Jackson was working on a sequel to The Lost Weekend entitled Farther and Wider.

Jackson had relapsed into alcoholism during the months before his death, and had become estranged from his family. Jackson had been closeted for the greater part of his life and, in his later years, attempted to come to terms with his bisexuality. Jackson identified as bisexual late in life and began living with his male lover in 1965.

== Bibliography ==
=== Novels ===
- The Lost Weekend (1944)
- The Fall of Valor (1946)
- The Outer Edges (1948) aka Thread of Evil
- A Second-Hand Life (1967)

=== Story collections ===
- The Sunnier Side: Twelve Arcadian Tales (1950)
- Earthly Creatures (1953)

=== Short stories ===
Title	Publication	Collected in
"Palm Sunday"	Partisan Review 6.4 (Summer 1939)	The Sunnier Side
"Rachel's Summer" Partisan Review 6.5 (Fall 1939)		The Sunnier Side
"A Night Visitor"	Mademoiselle (June 1944)	The Sunnier Side
"The Long Way Home"	Collier's (August 5, 1944)	-
"Funny Dream"	The New Yorker (March 17, 1945)	-
"Tenting Tonight" aka "Thanks for a Wonderful Time"	Good Housekeeping (May 1949)	The Sunnier Side
"The Sunnier Side"	Cosmopolitan (March 1950)	The Sunnier Side
"The Band Concert"	The Sunnier Side (1950)	The Sunnier Side
"The Sisters"	The Sunnier Side (1950)	The Sunnier Side
"In the Chair"	The Sunnier Side (1950)	The Sunnier Side
"The Benighted Savage"	The Sunnier Side (1950)	The Sunnier Side
"How War Came to Arcadia, N. Y."	The Sunnier Side (1950)	The Sunnier Side
"By the Sea"	The Sunnier Side (1950)	The Sunnier Side
"Sophistication"	The Sunnier Side (1950)	The Sunnier Side
"The Break"	Collier's (September 1, 1951)	Earthly Creatures
"Cousin Agnes"	Esquire (March 1952)	-
"Pretend You're a Hero"	John Bull (May 10, 1952)	-
"Last Laughter"	Woman's Home Companion (June 1952)	-
"The Boy Who Ran Away"	Harper's Bazaar (November 1952)	Earthly Creatures
"Millstones"	Esquire (May 1953)	-
"Parting at Morning" aka "A Mother's Day Story"	Today's Woman (May 1953)	Earthly Creatures
"Don't Call Me Sonny"	Esquire (July 1953)	-
"Romeo"	Earthly Creatures (September 1953)	Earthly Creatures
"A Sunday Drive"	Earthly Creatures (September 1953)	Earthly Creatures
"Money"	Earthly Creatures (September 1953)	Earthly Creatures
"The Cheat"	Earthly Creatures (September 1953)	Earthly Creatures
"The Outlander"	Earthly Creatures (September 1953)	Earthly Creatures
"Old Men and Boys"	Earthly Creatures (September 1953)	Earthly Creatures
"The Sleeper Awakened"	Earthly Creatures (September 1953)	Earthly Creatures
"Landscape with Figures"	Esquire (December 1953)	-
"I Don't Fool Around"	Manhunt (August 1954)	-
"A Bachelor in the Making"	Manhunt (December 1954)	-
"Midsummer Night"	The Gent (October 1957)	-
"One O'clock in the Morning"	McCall's (April 1961)	-
"Janie"	The Gent (April 1963)	-
"The Loving Offenders"	McCall's (July 1963)	-
"The Lady Julia"	McCall's (April 1965)	-
