= The Lost Weekend =

1945 film by Billy Wilder

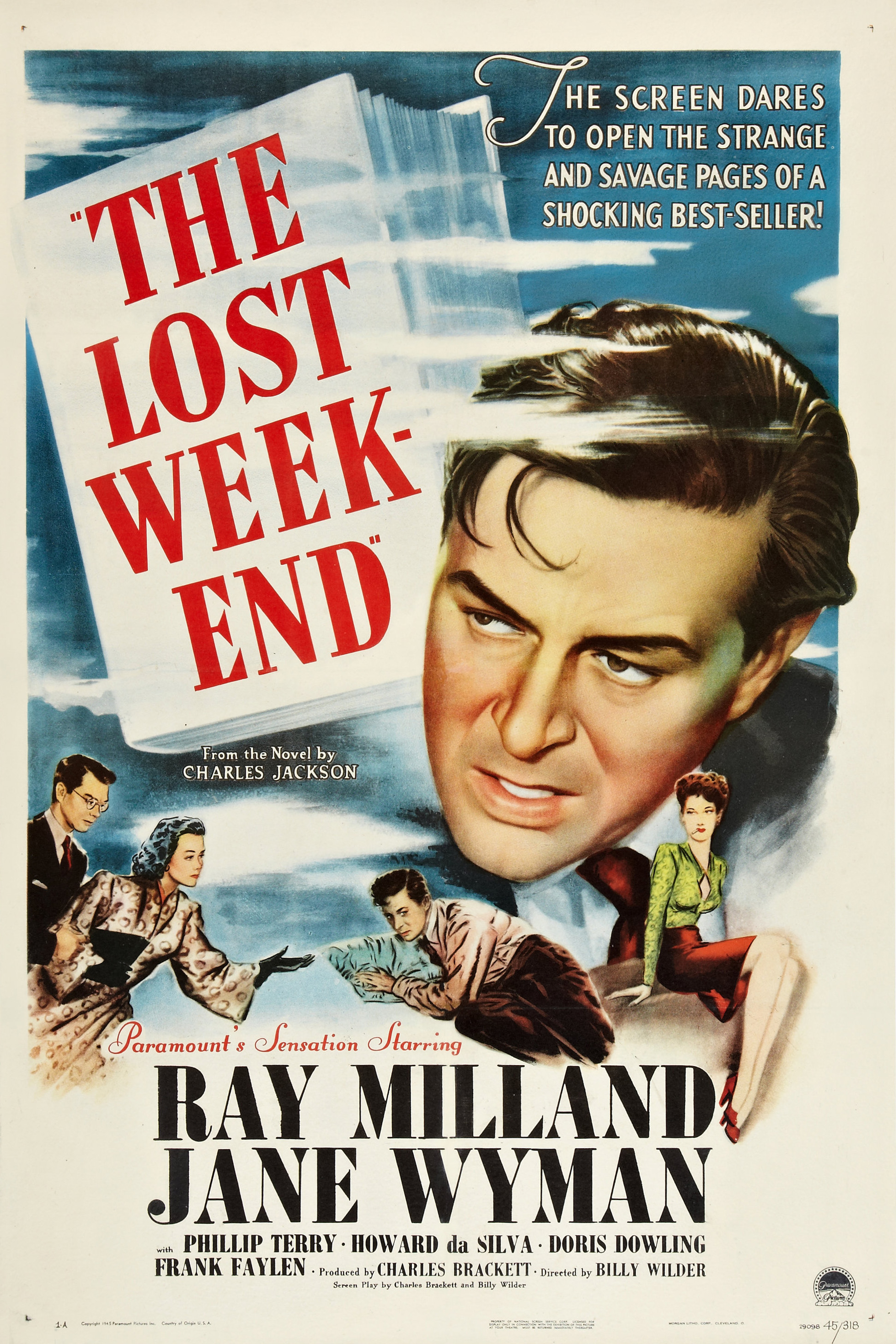
- Theatrical release poster
- Directed by: Billy Wilder
- Screenplay by: Charles Brackett; Billy Wilder
- Based on: The Lost Weekend by Charles R. Jackson
- Produced by: Charles Brackett
- Starring: Ray Milland; Jane Wyman; Phillip Terry; Howard da Silva; Doris Dowling; Frank Faylen
- Cinematography: John F. Seitz
- Edited by: Doane Harrison
- Music by: Miklós Rózsa
- Color process: Black and white
- Production company: Paramount Pictures
- Distributed by: Paramount Pictures
- Release date: November 29, 1945
- Running time: 101 minutes
- Country: United States
- Language: English
- Budget: $1.25 million
- Box office: $11,000,000 plus $4.3 million (US rentals)

The Lost Weekend is a 1945 American drama film noir directed by Billy Wilder, and starring Ray Milland and Jane Wyman. It was based on Charles R. Jackson's 1944 novel about an alcoholic writer. The film was nominated for seven Academy Awards and won four: Best Picture, Best Director, Best Actor, and Best Adapted Screenplay. It also shared the Grand Prix at the first Cannes Film Festival, making it one of only four films—the other three being Marty (1955), Parasite (2019) and Anora (2024)—to win both the Academy Award for Best Picture and the highest award at Cannes.

On review aggregator Rotten Tomatoes, the film has an approval rating of 97% based on 70 reviews, with an average rating of 8.4/10. The site's critical consensus reads, "Director Billy Wilder's unflinchingly honest look at the effects of alcoholism may have had some of its impact blunted by time, but it remains a powerful and remarkably prescient film." In 2011, it was selected for preservation in the United States National Film Registry by the Library of Congress as being "culturally, historically, or aesthetically significant."

== Plot ==
On Thursday, alcoholic New York writer Don Birnam is packing for a weekend vacation with his brother Wick. Although they are leaving mid-afternoon, when Don's girlfriend Helen drops by and mentions that she is attending a concert that afternoon, Don suggests that Wick goes with her and the brothers can then catch a later train. His motive is self-serving: he has a bottle hidden outside the window and intends to sneak it into his suitcase. Wick eventually discovers the bottle and pours it down the drain. Knowing that all the liquor Don had hidden in the apartment has been disposed of, and believing that he has no money for more, Helen and Wick go to the concert.

After finding ten dollars Wick left for the cleaning lady, Don heads for Nat's Bar, calling in at a liquor store on the way to purchase two bottles of rye. He intends to be back home in time to meet Wick but loses track of time from drinking. Arriving home, he overhears Wick say that he has given up on helping Don and is leaving, scolding Helen for deciding to stay and wait for Don. Don hides a bottle in the apartment while drinking the other one.

On Friday, at Nat's Bar, Don reveals that he intends to write a novel about his battle with alcoholism, called The Bottle. In a flashback, he recalls how he first met Helen at the opera house after the cloakroom has mixed up their coats. Subsequently, the two strike up a romance, and he remains sober during this time. While going to meet her parents, he overhears them talking about his unemployment and how they are not certain if he is good enough for Helen. He loses his nerve and sneaks off, returning home where he gets drunk. Wick tries to cover for him when she goes to his apartment, but Don confesses that he is two people: "Don the writer", whose fear of failure causes him to drink, and "Don the drunk", who always has to be bailed out by Wick. Helen devotes herself to helping him.

After telling Nat the story behind his proposed novel, Don heads back home to begin writing it. However, his alcohol cravings get the better of him and he begins a futile search for that second bottle from the previous night. He goes to a nightclub, realizes that he cannot pay the bill and steals money from a woman's purse. He is caught, thrown out, and told never to return. Once home, he finds the hidden bottle by chance and drinks himself into a stupor.

On Saturday, broke and sick, Don decides to pawn his typewriter so he can buy more alcohol, but discovers that the pawnshops are closed for Yom Kippur. Desperate for money, he visits Gloria, a prostitute who has a crush on him. She gives him some money, but he falls down her stairs and is knocked unconscious. He wakes up in an alcoholics' ward at Bellevue Hospital, where a nurse, Bim, mocks him. Bim offers to help offset his sure-to-come delirium tremens, but Don rejects the assistance and escapes while the staff is occupied with a raving, violent patient. He steals a bottle of whiskey from a store after threatening the owner and spends the next day drinking. Suffering from delirium tremens, he hallucinates a nightmarish scene in which a bat flies in through his window and kills a mouse, spilling its blood. His screams alert the landlady, who contacts Helen. Finding Don collapsed and in a delirious state, Helen assists him to clean up and get to bed; she stays overnight on his couch.

On Tuesday morning, Don slips out and pawns Helen's coat, the one that had brought them together. Helen discovers that he has traded the coat for a gun with which he intends to commit suicide. Racing back to Don's apartment, she interrupts him and pleads with him, going so far as to beg him to drink the last portion of whisky left in the bottle he had stolen. She declares she would rather he be alive as an alcoholic. He refuses and, while they are arguing, Nat arrives to return Don's typewriter. Helen finally convinces him that "Don the writer" and “Don the drunk” are the same person. He commits to writing his novel The Bottle, dedicated to her, which will recount the events of the weekend. As evidence of his resolve, he drops a cigarette into the glass of whisky to make it undrinkable.

== Cast ==
- Ray Milland as Don Birnam
- Jane Wyman as Helen St. James
- Phillip Terry as Wick Birnam
- Howard da Silva as Nat
- Doris Dowling as Gloria
- Frank Faylen as 'Bim' Nolan, the ward nurse
- Mary Young as Mrs. Deveridge
- Anita Bolster as Mrs. Foley
- Lilian Fontaine as Mrs. St. James
- Frank Orth as Opera Cloak Room Attendant
- Lewis Russell as Mr. St. James
- Harry Tenbrook as Drunk in Alcoholic Ward (uncredited)

== Production and notable features ==
Wilder was originally drawn to this material after having worked with Raymond Chandler on the screenplay for Double Indemnity. Chandler was a recovering alcoholic at the time, and the stress and tumultuous relationship with Wilder during the collaboration caused him to start drinking again. Wilder made the film, in part, to try to explain Chandler to himself.

Wilder originally wanted Jose Ferrer for the role of Don, but he turned it down. Charles Brackett's first choice for playing Helen was Olivia de Havilland, but she was involved with a lawsuit that prevented her from being in any film at that time. It has been said that Katharine Hepburn and Jean Arthur were also considered for the role.

Film critic Manny Farber in The New Republic, January 7, 1946, offered this appraisal of Frank Faylen’s performance as "Bim" Nolan in The Lost Weekend: "One episode where the directing and the acting have a fling involves a male nurse, in a provocative, sneering act—one of the only inspired movie portraits of homosexuality I have ever seen."

The majority of the film was shot at Paramount Studios in Hollywood. Wilder, however, insisted they shoot part of the film on location in New York City to create a distinct sense of realism. On October 1, 1944, Wilder and his small crew began filming in New York, mostly along Third Avenue in Midtown East Manhattan. To further create a realistic atmosphere, Wilder and his crew used hidden cameras, placing them behind boxes or in the back of trucks, and capturing Milland as he walked up 3rd Avenue among actual pedestrians who were unaware a film was being made. The production also had the unprecedented permission to film inside Bellevue Hospital in the alcoholic ward, a request that would be denied to future films. After completing filming in New York, the cast and crew returned to California to resume principal photography, where they recreated several New York locations, including a replica of P. J. Clarke's, a tavern often frequented by author Charles Jackson.

The film also made famous the "character walking toward the camera in a daze as time passes" camera effect.

Once The Lost Weekend was completed, it was shown to a preview audience, who laughed at what they considered Milland's overwrought performance, and the studio considered shelving the film. Part of the problem was that the print shown at the preview did not have Miklós Rózsa's original musical soundtrack, but instead had a temporary track containing upbeat jazz music. However, once the Rózsa score was in place, along with a re-shoot of the last scene, audiences and critics reacted favorably. The film's musical score was among the first to feature the theremin, which was used to create the pathos of alcoholism.

Rights to the film are currently held by Universal Studios, which owns the pre-1950 Paramount sound feature film library via EMKA, Ltd.

The film differs significantly from the book by leaving out the novel's noted homosexual overtones, namely the strong implication that Don Birnam is (as was the book's author, Charles Jackson) a closeted homosexual.

The liquor industry launched a campaign to undermine the film even before its release. Allied Liquor Industries, a national trade organization, wrote an open letter to Paramount warning that anti-drinking groups would use the film to reinstate prohibition. Liquor interests allegedly enlisted gangster Frank Costello to offer Paramount $5 million to buy the film's negative to burn it. Wilder quipped that if they’d offered him $5 million, "I would have [burned the negative]."

== Reception ==
James Agee, critic and author, wrote in The Nation 1945: " ... it is unusually hard, tense, cruel, intelligent, and straightforward. But I see nothing in it that is new, sharply individual, or strongly creative. It is, rather, a skillful restatement, satisfying and easy to overrate in a time of general dereliction and fatuousness, of some sound basic commonplaces." Leslie Halliwell gave it four of four stars, stating: "Startlingly original on its release, this stark little drama keeps its power, especially in the scenes on New York streets and in a dipso ward. It could scarcely have been more effectively filmed." Pauline Kael wrote, " ... an unusually daring popular melodrama ... The picture lacks fluidity, and the slowly paced scenes seem overcalculated, with each colorful character and tense vignette standing out too sharply; everything is nailed down to a meaning for us. The whole thing is shot in imaginative resonance; what it has is the Brackett-Wilder specialty—a distinctive cruel (and sometimes cruelly funny) edge." Leonard Maltin gave the film four of four stars: "Unrelenting drama of alcoholism—and a landmark of adult film-making."

On Rotten Tomatoes, the film holds a 97% rating based on 74 reviews. The site's consensus: "Director Billy Wilder's unflinchingly honest look at the effects of alcoholism may have had some of its impact blunted by time, but it remains a powerful and remarkably prescient film."

=== Box office performance ===
The film was a commercial success. Produced on a budget of $1.25 million, it grossed $11 million at the box office, earning $4.3 million in US theatrical rentals.

=== Academy Awards ===
At the 18th Academy Awards in March 1946, The Lost Weekend received seven nominations and won in four categories.

Category	Nominee	Result	Lost To
Best Picture	Charles Brackett	Won	—N/a
Best Director	Billy Wilder	Won	—N/a
Best Actor	Ray Milland	Won	—N/a
Best Adapted Screenplay	Billy Wilder and Charles Brackett	Won	—N/a
Best Cinematography	John F. Seitz	Nominated	Harry Stradling for The Picture of Dorian Gray
Best Original Score	Miklós Rózsa	Nominated	Miklós Rózsa for Spellbound
Best Film Editing	Doane Harrison	Nominated	Robert J. Kern for National Velvet

=== Cannes Film Festival ===
This film also shared the 1946 Grand Prix du Festival International du Film at the first Cannes Film Festival and Milland was awarded Best Actor. To date, The Lost Weekend, Marty (1955), Parasite (2019), and Anora (2024) are the only films ever to win both the Academy Award for Best Picture and the highest award at the Cannes Film Festival. (Marty received the Palme d'Or (Golden Palm), which, beginning at the 1955 festival, replaced the Grand Prix du Festival International du Film as the highest award.)

=== National Film Registry ===
In 2011, The Lost Weekend was deemed "culturally, historically, or aesthetically significant" by the United States Library of Congress and selected for preservation in the National Film Registry. The Registry said the film was "an uncompromising look at the devastating effects of alcoholism" and that it "melded an expressionistic film-noir style with documentary realism to immerse viewers in the harrowing experiences of an aspiring New York writer willing to do almost anything for a drink."

== Adaptations ==
The Lost Weekend was adapted as a radio play on the January 7, 1946, broadcast of The Screen Guild Theater, starring Milland, Wyman, and Faylen in their original film roles.

On March 10, 1946, three days after winning the Academy Award, Milland appeared as a guest on a radio broadcast of The Jack Benny Show. In a spoof of The Lost Weekend, Milland and Jack Benny played alcoholic twin brothers. Phil Harris, who normally played Jack Benny's hard-drinking bandleader on the show, played the brother who tried to convince Ray and Jack to give up liquor. ("Ladies and gentlemen," said an announcer, "the opinions expressed by Mr. Harris are written in the script and are not necessarily his own.") In the alcoholic ward scene, smart-aleck Frank Nelson played the ward attendant who promised Ray and Jack that they would soon start seeing DT visions of strange animals. When the DT visions appeared (with Mel Blanc providing pig squeals, monkey chatters, and other animal sound effects), Ray chased them off. "Ray, they're gone!", Benny shouted. "What did you do?" Milland replied, "I threw my Oscar at them!"

On April 21, 1949, Jackie Gleason, making his debut as a regular on NBC's The Hank Ladd Show (known before that date as The Arrow Show, newly recast and retitled accordingly), delivered what Variety dubbed the episode's "standout segment" with his Lost Weekend spoof. Portraying the protagonist as a "five-year-old moppet who gets plastered on soft drinks," he is seen "guzzling milkshakes and cokes, weaving down Third Avenue and finally, hit by the DT's, scared witless by a Mickey Mouse."

== Sources ==
- Farber, Manny. 2009. Farber on Film: The Complete Film Writings of Manny Farber. Edited by Robert Polito. Library of America. ISBN 978-1-59853-050-6
