= Will Rogers Institute =

Medical research charity

The Will Rogers Institute's mission is to perpetuate the memory of Will Rogers by promoting and engaging in medical research pertaining to cardiopulmonary diseases and educating the public on topics of health and fitness. It is named for actor and comedian Will Rogers, who died in a plane crash in 1935.

The Institute supports research programs that study debilitating pulmonary disorders. These programs provide pulmonary rehabilitation at academic and medical centers across the country. These programs also provide neonatal ventilators to needy hospitals so that not one baby suffers or dies because of the lack of a proper ventilation system. For over 30 years, the Will Rogers Institute has been a leader in health-related public service announcements that appear on movie screens and television and are heard on radio stations across the United States and provide free health booklets and materials.

Each summer in movie theaters across the country, the Will Rogers Institute embarks upon a special fund-raising event - the Summer Theatrical Fund-Raising Campaign - that raises money for pulmonary research, medical school fellowships, neonatal ventilators and education. The summer campaign is a time-honored tradition that began in 1936 and starred James Cagney, Humphrey Bogart and Bette Davis, and recently has been hosted by celebrities such as Anthony Hopkins, Tommy Lee Jones, The Rock and Geena Davis.

After viewing the theatrical public service announcement, moviegoers support the Institute by making a donation or purchasing a special combo pack at the movie theater's concession stand. The generosity of movie patrons - with the support and dedication of movie theaters, movie studios, and sponsors - has enabled Will Rogers Institute to collect over $90 million for its causes.

== The Will Rogers Institute Annual Prize for Research ==
The Institute awards an Annual Prize for Research to scientists who have made seminal contributions to the understanding or treatment of pulmonary diseases. The Prize includes a $50,000 cash award. Initiated in 2007, the Annual Prize for Research has been awarded three times.

Francis Collins, present director of the NIH, was the first to receive the prize, which honored his discovery of the cystic fibrosis transmembrane conductance regulator encoding gene CFTR, mutated in cystic fibrosis, a genetic disease commonly found in Caucasian populations and often accompanied by severe pulmonary manifestations.

Peter Agre, recipient of the 2003 Nobel Prize in Chemistry, was recognized with the Will Rogers Institute Annual Prize for Research in 2008 for his discovery of aquaporins: proteins that allow water molecules to cross biological membranes, and thereby play a vitally important role in epithelial physiology (including the physiology of pulmonary epithelium).

Bruce Beutler received the prize in 2009 for isolating tumor necrosis factor (TNF), demonstrating its central role in inflammation, and subsequently discovering the receptor for lipopolysaccharide (LPS), a member of the Toll-like receptor family. This work revealed the key innate immune receptors through which mammals sense infection.

Anthony Fauci received the 2011 prize for his pioneering work in the field of HIV/AIDS research.
