= University Press of America =

American academic publishing company

- Parent company: Bloomsbury Publishing
- Founded: 1975
- Founder: Raymond D. Fellers and Stanley D. Plotnick
- Country of origin: United States
- Headquarters location: Lanham, Maryland, U.S.
- Publication types: Academic books
- Official website: www.univpress.com

University Press of America (UPA) is the former name of an American academic publishing company based in Lanham, Maryland, which became the parent company of Rowman & Littlefield publishing house, then was later re-introduced as the name of an imprint of "itself" after changing the name of the parent company.

Originally founded in 1975, as a standalone academic publisher, University Press of America purchased the Rowman & Littlefield publishing house in 1987. In 1998, University Press of America adopted the Rowman & Littlefield name as its own, while introducing the University Press of America name as an imprint of Rowman & Littlefield, specializing in the publication of scholarly works.

In 2024 Bloomsbury Publishing acquired Rowman & Littlefield. The transaction included the catalogue and the trademark of University Press of America, the domain name was redirected to the Bloomsbury Academic page of Rowman & Littlefield.
