= Blake Bailey =

American writer (born 1963)

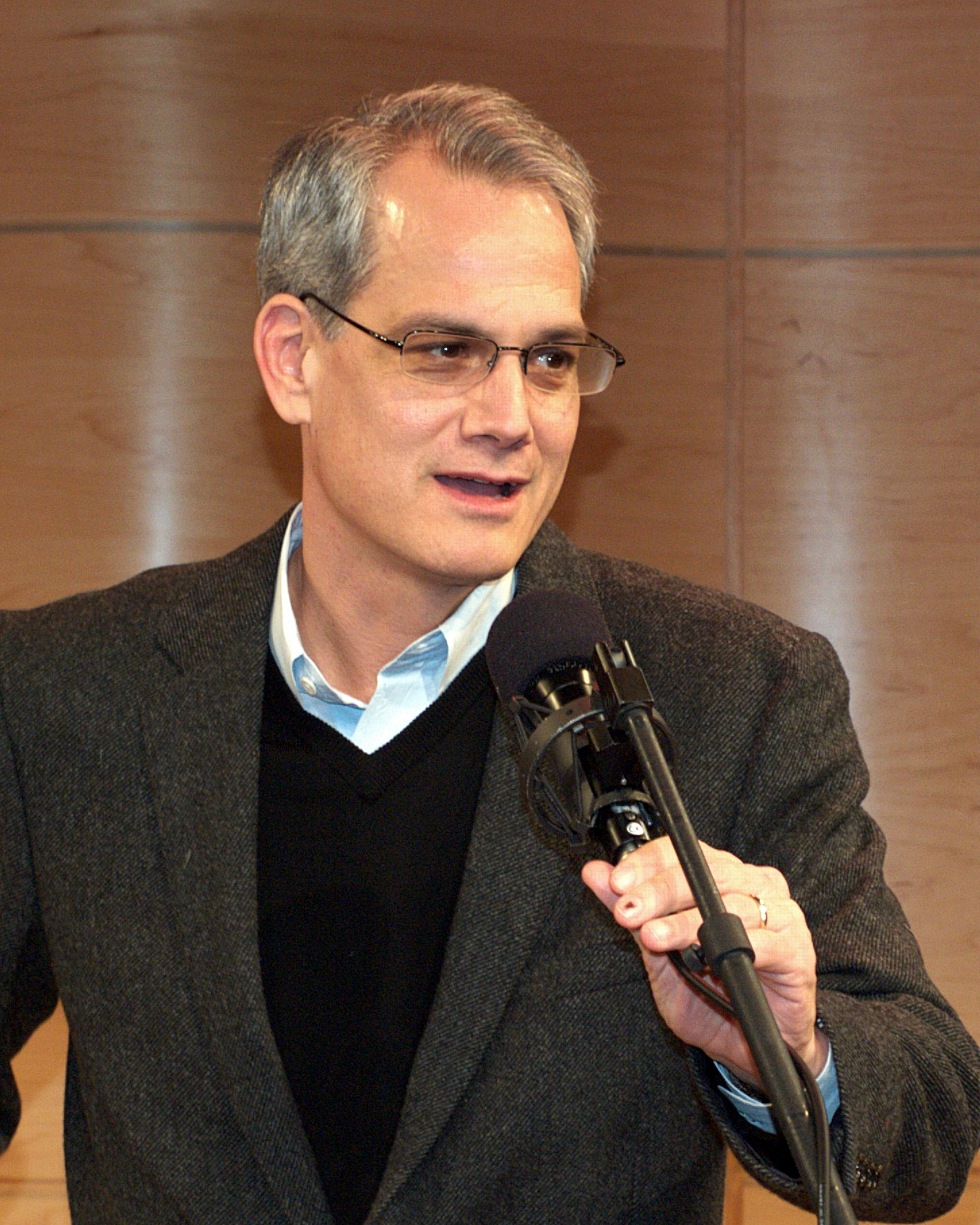
- January 2011
- Born: Blake Bailey; July 1, 1963 (age 63)
- Education: Tulane University
- Occupation: Biographer

Blake Bailey (born July 1, 1963) is an American writer and educator. Bailey is known for his literary biographies of Richard Yates, John Cheever, Charles Jackson, and Philip Roth. He is the editor of the Library of America omnibus editions of Cheever's stories and novels.

== Background ==
Bailey grew up in Oklahoma City and attended high school at Bishop McGuinness Catholic High School, where he was friends with another future author, Dan Fagin. He was a student at Tulane University, from which he graduated in 1985.

Bailey and his family lost their house and most of their possessions in Hurricane Katrina, an experience he wrote about in a series of articles for Slate.

In 2009–2010, Bailey was Writer in Residence at The College of William and Mary in Virginia. From 2010 to 2016, he was the Mina Hohenberg Darden Professor of Creative Writing at Old Dominion University in Norfolk, Virginia. He was succeeded by Black Elk author Joe Jackson. Bailey is a tennis enthusiast.

== Career ==
After college, Bailey wrote occasional freelance pieces. He taught gifted eighth-graders at Lusher Middle School in New Orleans in the 1990s.

After publishing a long critical profile of Richard Yates, Bailey was contracted to write a full-length biography of the novelist, A Tragic Honesty: The Life and Work of Richard Yates (2003).

In 2005, Bailey was awarded a Guggenheim Fellowship to work on his biography, Cheever: A Life, which won the 2009 National Book Critics Circle Award among other honors. Bailey also edited a two-volume edition of Cheever's work for the Library of America.

Bailey published his biography of the novelist Charles Jackson, Farther & Wilder: The Lost Weekends and Literary Dreams of Charles Jackson (2013), as well as a memoir, The Splendid Things We Planned: A Family Portrait (2014).

In an interview with The New York Times published on November 17, 2012, Philip Roth said that Bailey was his official biographer and at work on that project. While Roth was alive, he gave Bailey exclusive access to papers, friends and family, and made himself available for extensive interviews. Bailey's 880-page biography of Roth, entitled Philip Roth: The Biography, was published in the United States by W. W. Norton & Company on April 6, 2021, and in the United Kingdom by Jonathan Cape on April 8, 2021.

Bailey's primary influence is Lytton Strachey, who he has praised for his style and sense of humor. Other influences on Bailey's work include Vladimir Nabokov, Evelyn Waugh, and PG Wodehouse.

== Sexual misconduct allegations ==
On April 16, 2021, several former students of Bailey's left comments on a critical review of Bailey's Roth biography, alleging that Bailey had groomed them when they were minors. On April 18, 2021, Bailey was dropped by his agency, the Story Factory, following these allegations of sexual misconduct, which Bailey denied. On April 20, 2021, journalists Ramon Antonio Vargas and Edward Champion first reported on these allegations in detail. Bailey was accused of grooming his former students at Lusher Middle School for sex. One former student, Eve Crawford Peyton, has accused Bailey of raping her when she was 22 years old. On April 27, 2021, he was also accused of "nonconsensual sex" by Valentina Rice, a publishing executive.

In a statement provided to the Associated Press on April 21 by W. W. Norton & Company, the publisher announced it had "decided to pause the shipping and promotion of Philip Roth: The Biography pending any further information that may emerge." On April 28, W. W. Norton announced that it is taking the book out of print. Three weeks later, in May 2021, Skyhorse Publishing announced that it would release a paperback, ebook, and audiobook versions of the biography.

In 2025, Bailey published a memoir titled Canceled Lives: My Father, My Scandal, and Me, which focuses on the death of his father Burck, his brother Scott's suicide, and the final moments of Philip Roth's life, which he parallels with his own "social death" following the allegations.

== Awards and honors ==
- 2000 Louisiana Humanities Teacher of the Year
- 2003 National Book Critics Circle Award finalist for A Tragic Honesty: The Life and Work of Richard Yates
- 2005 Guggenheim Fellowship for Cheever: A Life
- 2009 National Book Critics Circle Award winner for Cheever: A Life
- 2009 Francis Parkman Prize winner for Cheever: A Life
- 2009 Pulitzer Prize finalist for Cheever: A Life
- 2009 James Tait Black Memorial Prize finalist for Cheever: A Life
- 2010 Academy Award in Literature given by the American Academy of Arts and Letters
- 2014 National Book Critics Circle Award (Autobiography) finalist for The Splendid Things We Planned

== Bibliography ==
=== As author ===
- Sixties. New York: Bdd Promotional Book Co. 1992. ISBN 978-0-792-45764-0. OCLC 1077746456.
- A Tragic Honesty: The Life and Work of Richard Yates. New York: Picador. 2003. ISBN 978-0-312-28721-4. OCLC 51040212.
- Cheever: A Life. New York: Alfred A. Knopf. 2009. ISBN 978-1-4000-4394-1. OCLC 232980275.
- Farther & Wilder: The Lost Weekends and Literary Dreams of Charles Jackson. New York: Alfred A. Knopf. 2013. ISBN 978-0-307-27358-1. OCLC 796761402.
- The Splendid Things We Planned: A Family Portrait. New York: W. W. Norton & Company. 2014. ISBN 978-0-393-23957-7. OCLC 866251891.
- Philip Roth: The Biography. New York: W. W. Norton & Company. 2021. ISBN 978-0-393-24072-6. OCLC 1155082654.
- Canceled Lives: My Father, My Scandal, and Me. New York: Skyhorse Publishing. 2025. ISBN 978-1-510-78332-4. OCLC 1512828401.

=== As editor ===
- John Cheever: Collected Stories and Other Writings (Library of America, 2009)
- John Cheever: Complete Novels (Library of America, 2009)
- The Sunnier Side and Other Stories, by Charles Jackson (Vintage/Random House, 2013)
