= June 1982 =

Month of 1982

<<	June 1982					>>
Su	Mo	Tu	We	Th	Fr	Sa
		1	2	3	4	5
6	7	8	9	10	11	12
13	14	15	16	17	18	19
20	21	22	23	24	25	26
27	28	29	30

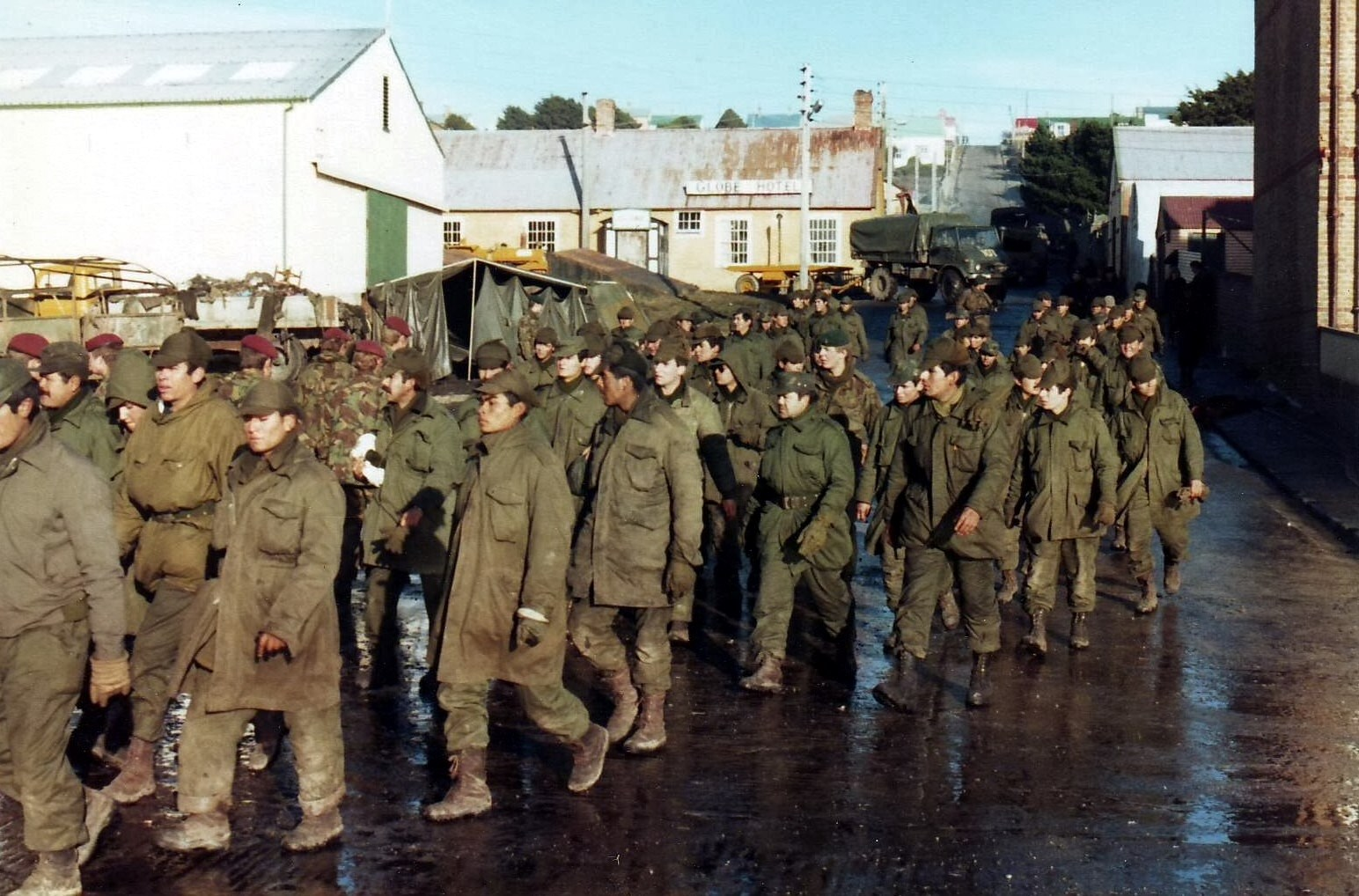
June 14, 1982: Argentina surrenders and ends the Falklands War, occupiers are taken prisoners of war

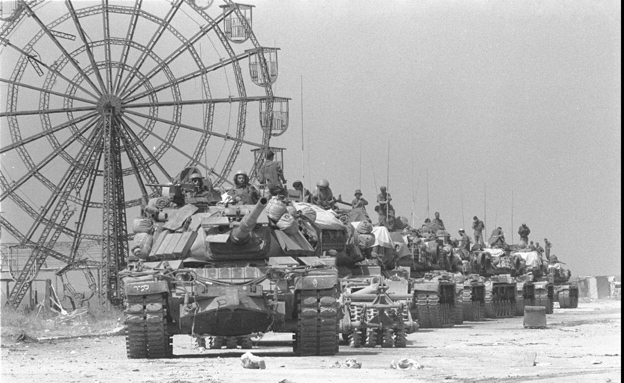
June 6, 1982: Israel invades Lebanon, beginning the 1982 Lebanon War

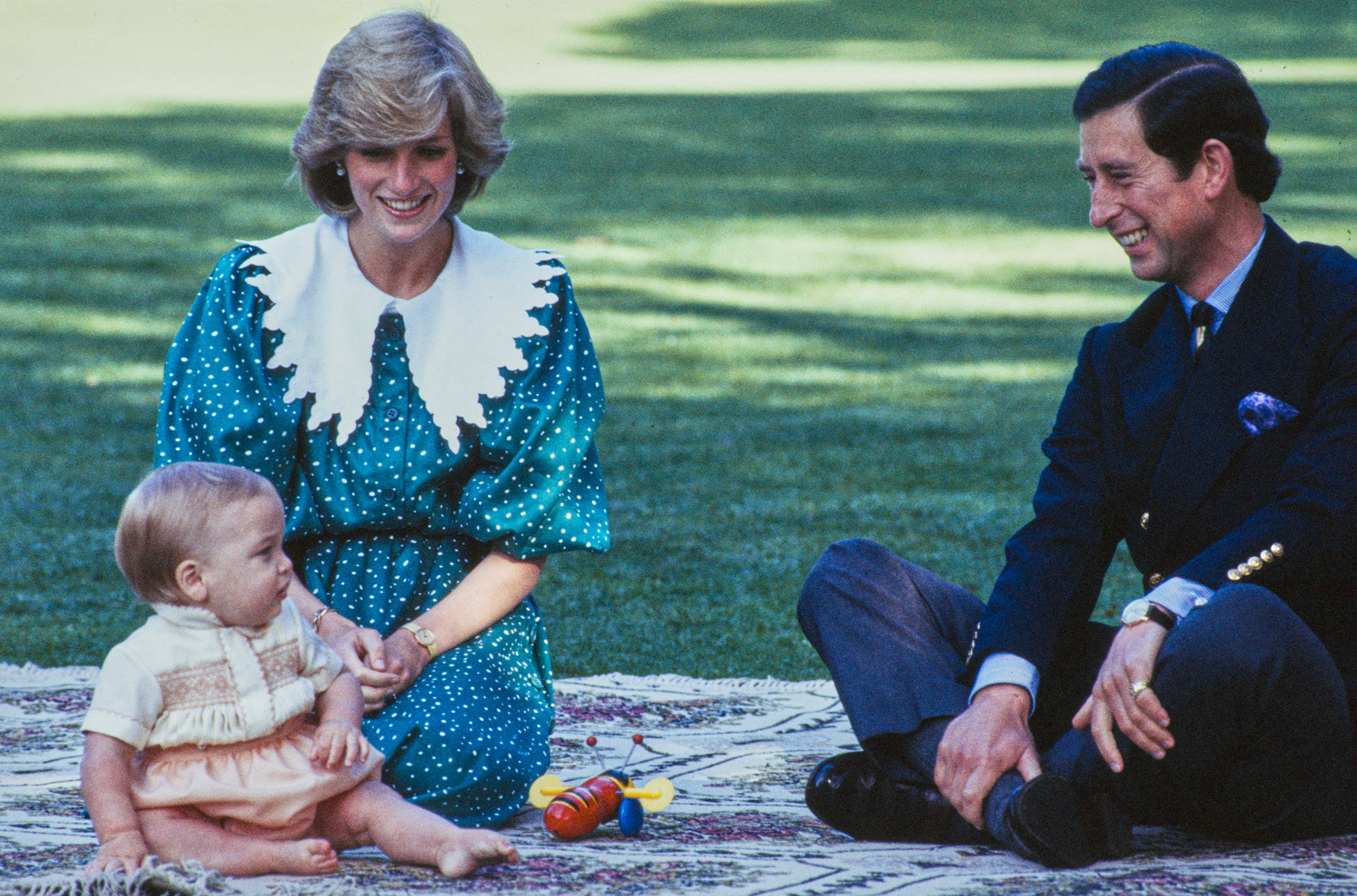
June 21, 1982: Prince William, heir to the British throne and the future King William V, is born to Princess Diana and the future King Charles III

The following events occurred in June 1982:

== June 1, 1982 (Tuesday) ==
- The U.S. Supreme Court rendered its opinion in United States v. Ross, holding, by a 6 to 3 decision, that the a search without a warrant, of closed containers found inside a vehicle during a legal stop, was acceptable under the Fourth Amendment to the U.S. Constitution.
- The Norfolk Southern Railway was created in the United States by the merger of the Norfolk and Western Railway and the Southern Railway.
- Born: Justine Henin, Belgian professional tennis player, winner of the women's singles at the French Open (2003, 2005, 2006 and 2007) and the Australian Open (2004), and ranked No. 1 in the world by WTA for 117 weeks; in Liege
- Died: Evelyn Lagu, 41, Ugandan singer and actress, died of kidney failure.

== June 2, 1982 (Wednesday) ==
- Golden Fleece, ridden by Pat Eddery, won Britain's premier thoroughbred horce race, the Epsom Derby. Born in the U.S. at Lexington, Kentucky, Golden Fleece was sired by the 1970 English Triple Crown winner, Nijinsky.
- Born: Jewel Staite, Canadian TV actress, known for the starring role in the Global TV series Family Law in White Rock, British Columbia
- Died:
  - Fazal Chaudhry, 78, President of Pakistan from 1973 to 1978
  - Emory Collins, 77, American sprint car driver
  - Herbert Quandt, 71, German industrialist and Nazi known for using slave labor from concentration camps to work at the Pertrix GmBH chemical factory, as well as for rescuing the BMW motor company from bankruptcy.

== June 3, 1982 (Thursday) ==
- In London, an assassination attempt, that would lead to the invasion and bombing of Lebanon by Israel, took place as terrorist Hussein Ghassan Said shot and seriously wounded Shlomo Argov, Israel's ambassador to the United Kingdom. Shortly after 11 p.m., Argov had departed a banquet at the Dorchester Hotel and was approached by three men from the Abu Nidal Organization as he walked out onto Park Lane. The would-be assassin, Said, was shot in the head by a member of London's Metropolitan Police Diplomatic Protection Group, assigned to guard Argov.
- In Kowloon in Hong Kong, at the Un Chau Estate public housing complex, 34 kindergarten students were stabbed, four of them fatally, by a schizophrenic man who had entered the Anne Anne Kindergarten. Earlier in the afternoon, Lee Chi-hang had killed his mother and his sister. The incident prompted an upgrade in security measures at Hong Kong schools, as well as compulsory out-patient treatment for persons discharged from housing institutions.
- In the U.S., a group of arsonists in Boston set fire to the Spero Toy Company in the South Boston neighborhood and caused $13.5 million in damage, beginning a wave of major arson fires in and around the Massachusetts city. Shortly after the Boston Fire Department had to reduce its workforce from 2,000 to 1,400 and closed 22 of its 77 fire stations, the arsonists had started a pattern of setting fires early on Friday mornings during the summer. The following Friday, 30 fires were started and 101 on June 18.
- Born: Yelena Isinbayeva, Russian pole vaulter and Olympic gold medalist in 2004 and 2008; in Volgograd, Russian SFSR, Soviet Union
- Died:
  - Robert Gottschalk, 64, American inventor of the first underwater camera, the first wide-screen photography and projection system (the Ultra Panavision MGM Camera 65), and the Panaflex camera, winner of two Academy Awards, was beaten and stabbed to death by his life partner Ronnie Chuman, three weeks after adding Chuman to his will.
  - Sergey Balasanian, 79, Soviet Armenian composer who wrote the first Tajik language opera (The Uprising at Vosse, in 1939), followed by Blacksmith Kova (1941) and Bakhtior and Nisso (1954)
  - Peter Carter, 48, British and Canadian film director known for Klondike Fever (1979), died of a heart attack.

== June 4, 1982 (Friday) ==
- The films Star Trek II: The Wrath of Khan and Poltergeist premiered across North America on the same day, and would go on to become the sixth and eighth highest-grossing films of 1982, with $97 million worldwide for Star Trek II and $77 million worldwide for Poltergeist.
- Born: MC Jin (stage name for Jin Au-Yeung), American-born Hong Kong rapper, actor and comedian; in Miami, Florida
- Died:
  - Jabulile Nyawose, 33, South African trade unionist and anti-apartheid activist, was killed, along with her husband Petrus, by a car bomb placed outside their house in Manzini in Swaziland, where they were living in exile. Sixteen years later, after the fall of apartheid, an investigative commission would conclude that the killings had been approved by the South African government.
  - Kumar (stage name for Syed Ali Hasan Zaidi, 78, Indian and Pakistani film actor and producer known for Al Hilal and Mughal-e-Azam
  - Julius Ashkin, 61, American theoretical physicist

== June 5, 1982 (Saturday) ==
- The United Nations Security Council voted, 15 to 0, to approve UNSC Resolution 508, calling on both Israel and the Palestine Liberation Organization "to cease immediately and simultaneously all military activities within Lebanon and across the Lebanese-Israeli border and not later than 0600 hours, local time, on Sunday, 6 June 1982."

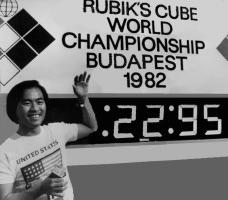
16-Year-old Speedcubing champion Minh Thai

- The first Rubik's Cube World Championship was held in Budapest with challengers from 19 nations competing to be the fastest to solve the 3x3x3 Rubik's Cube. Minh Thai of the United States won the competition with a speed of 22.95 seconds, and was presented the first prize, a gold-plated Rubik's Cube, by inventor Ernő Rubik. Another competition would not be held for 21 years.
- Born:
  - Zvjezdan Misimović, German-born Bosnian footballer with 84 caps for the Bosnia and Herzegovina national team; in Munich, West Germany
  - Achille Emaná, Cameroonian footballer with 42 caps for the Cameroon national team; in Yaoundé

== June 6, 1982 (Sunday) ==
- Israeli forces invaded southern Lebanon on orders of Israel's Defense Minister Ariel Sharon. At 11:00 in the morning, more than 250 Israeli tanks and armored personnel carriers, along with thousands of soldiers, crossed the Israel-Lebanon border and proceeded past the observation posts of the United Nations Peacekeeping Force. "Operation Peace for the Galilee" would eventually reach as far north as the outskirts of Beirut, the Lebanese capital.
- The first clash between the Israeli Defense Forces and the Palestine Liberation Organization began as the Battle of the Beaufort, an assault by the IDF against the 800-year-old Beaufort Castle. The IDF captured the castle the next day, albeit with the deaths of six of the 88 soldiers of the Golani Brigade, and 24 of the PLO defenders, as well as the capture of an Israeli fighter pilot who was shot down.
- The new government of Guatemala, led by General Efraín Ríos Montt, implemented its "Victoria 82" plan, changing the government's counterinsurgency program against leftist guerrillas from one of genocide against members of the Mayan minority to a combination of scorched-earth tactics and social welfare programs, along with incentives for Mayan and other rural civilians to join newly created "civilian self-defense patrols".
- In an incident of "friendly fire" in the Falklands War, the Royal Navy destroyer HMS Cardiff killed all four British Army servicemen who were flying in a Gazelle helicopter. The crew of Cardiff misidentified the British helicopter as an Argentine C-130 Hercules transport airplane and fired a Sea Dart missile to down the British craft.

== June 7, 1982 (Monday) ==
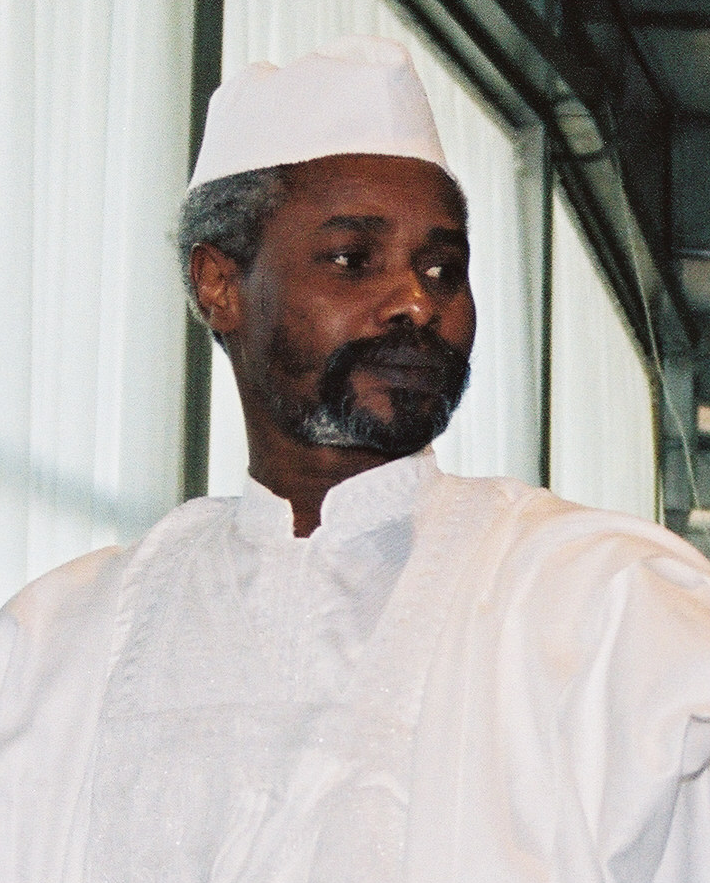
Hissène Habré

- In the African nation of Chad, rebel leader Hissène Habré and his followers from the Forces Armées du Nord (FAN) took control of the capital, N'Djamena, without opposition as President Goukouni Oueddei and much of his coalition government fled. Upon becoming the new chief of state, Habre began a reign of terror against people whom he considered to be his opponents, including supporters of Gpilpimo, and formed a secret police force, the DDS (Directorate of Documentation and Security) to arrest, torture and execute dissidents.
- Graceland, the mansion owned by the late singer Elvis Presley, was opened as a tourist attraction in Memphis, Tennessee, and would become the second most visited home in the United States, second only to the White House.
- The government of Uruguay's President, General Gregorio Conrado Álvarez, began a transition from military to civilian rule, allowing the South American nation's three traditional political parties (The Blancos, the Colorados, and the Civic Union) to resume political activities, but continued the ban against leftist parties. Elections would be held on November 28 for party delegates.
- The 761 feet (232 m) tall freestanding broadcasting tower Torrespaña was inaugurated in Madrid by Spain's RTVE television network.
- Michael Fagan, a 33-year-old British leftist, broke into Buckingham Palace, climbing up a drainpipe to reach the third floor, without interference from the palace security, even after the office was called by a witness. Fagan walked off the scene, but would make an even more brazen invasion of the Palace on July 9.
- Born:: Aya Shimokozuru, Japanese footballer who appeared in 28 games for the national women's team; in Nagaokakyō, Kyoto

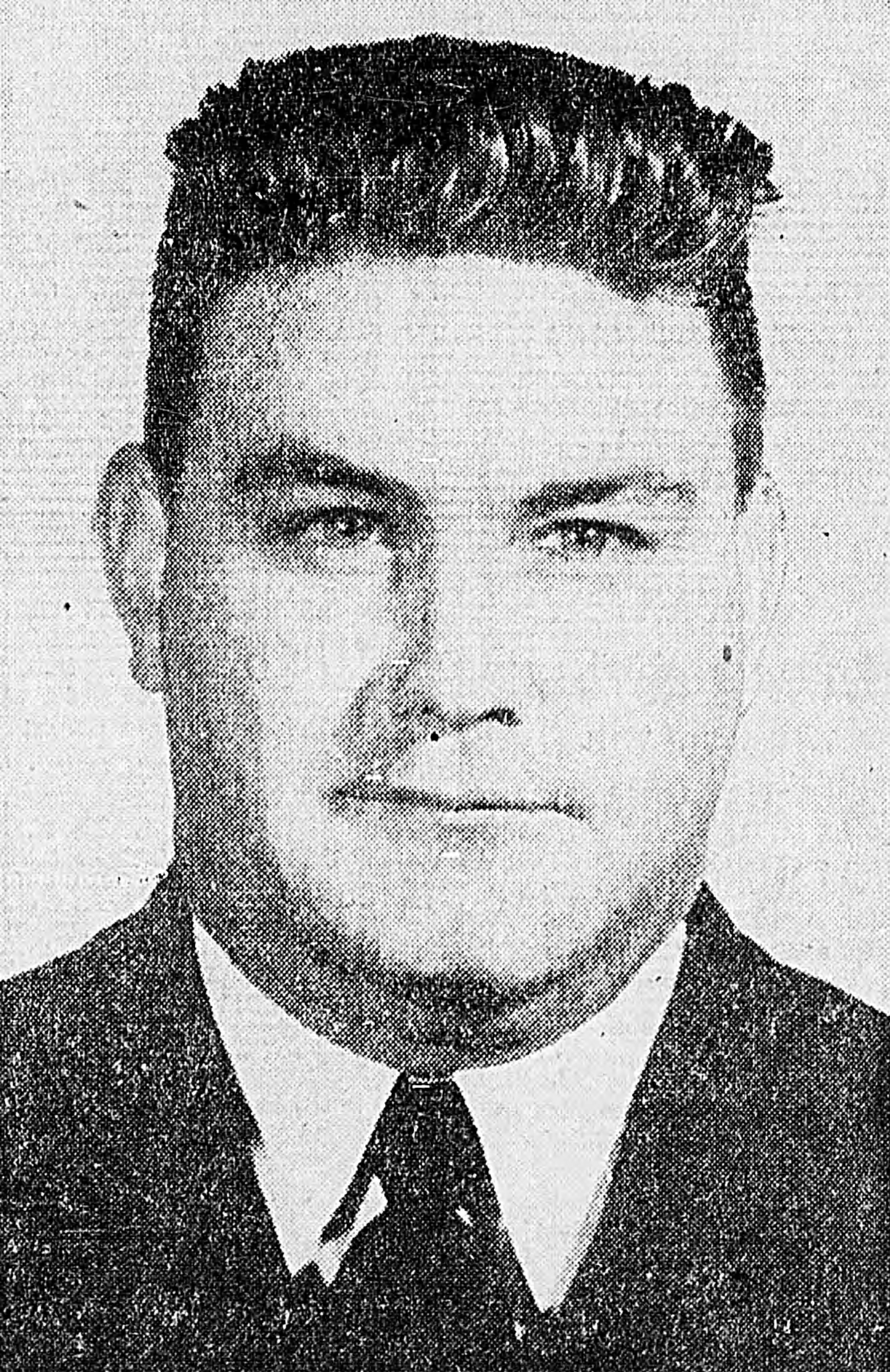
Demara, The Great Impostor

- Died:
  - Ferdinand Waldo Demara, 60, American impostor who impersonated various people to obtain employment as a surgeon in the U.S. Navy, a psychologist, a civil engineer, a deputy sheriff, a lawyer, a teacher, and a cancer researcher, died from complications of diabetes. He had been the subject of the Robert Crichton book The Great Impostor, which was adapted into a film of the same name starring Tony Curtis as Demara.
  - Lou DiMuro, American baseball umpire in the American League since 1963, died two hours after being struck by a car in Arlington, Texas, shortly after serving on the officiating crew in a game between the Chicago White Sox and the Texas Rangers.

== June 8, 1982 (Tuesday) ==
- The bombing of British troop transport ships in the Falklands War, killed 56 British servicemen and wounded more than 150 as two waves of Argentine Air Force A-4 Skyhawk fighter bombers struck British Army troops arriving at East Falkland. At 2:00 in the afternoon local time, the supply ships RFA Sir Galahad and Sir Tristram were hit on the first Argentine strike. The explosions and subsequent fires on Sir Galahad killed 48 men, 32 of whom 32 were soldiers from the Welsh Guards, and 11 other sailors. On the second strike at 4:50 in the afternoon, three of the Argentine Skyhawk jets were shot down during dogfights with Royal Air Force Sea Harrier fighters.
- All 137 people on VASP Flight 168, were killed when the Boeing 727 passenger jet crashed into a forest hillside in Fortaleza in Brazil.
- The Los Angeles Lakers defeated the Philadelphia 76ers, 114 to 104, to win the NBA championship in six games.
- The Battle of Jezzine, the first major clash between the armies of Israel and Syria in the Lebanon War, took place near the Lebanese town of Jezzine. The Israeli Defense Force captured Jezzine, with four tanks destroyed and six fighters shot down, while 20 Syrian tanks were destroyed and an undisclosed number of Syrian soldiers killed.
- U.S. President Ronald Reagan became the first American president to deliver an address to a joint session of Britain's House of Commons and House of Lords. Reagan predicted that the Soviet Union and the Communist parties of Eastern Europe would eventually be gone, and declared that "Freedom and democracy will leave Marxism and Leninism on the ash heap of history."
- Born: Kelly Brown, Scottish rugby union flanker with 64 caps for the Scotland national team from 2005 to 2017; in Edinburgh
- Died:
  - Satchel Paige, 75, African-American baseball player, Baseball Hall of Fame inductee since 1971, known for his career as a pitcher in the Negro Leagues (1927 to 1947) and the Major Leagues (1948–1953), as well as the oldest player to appear in an MLB game, at 59 for the Kansas City Athletics in 1965
  - Harriet T. Righter, 104, American game manufacturer who served as president of Selchow and Righter from 1923 to 1954, and acquired the distribution rights for the popular game Scrabble in 1952
  - Edson Queiroz, 57, Brazilian entrepreneur and founder of the Grupo Edson Queiroz conglomerate, was killed in the crash of VASP Flight 168.
  - Ivan Mistrik, 46, Slovak film actor known for the 1958 Slovak language film Šťastie príde v nedeľu) (Luck Will Come on Sunday) and the 1960 Czech language drama Romeo, Julie a tma (Romeo, Juliet and Darkness), committed suicide.
  - Jean Wiener, 86, French pianist and composer for film scores
  - William H. Brown Jr., 64, American composer and episode director on U.S. television, known for Westinghouse Studio One and Climax!

== June 9, 1982 (Wednesday) ==
- The Israeli Air Force (IAF) launched Operation Mole Cricket 19 (Mistva Aratzav 19), a suppression of enemy air defenses opeation to locate and destroy Syria's surface-to-air missile network within Lebanon's Bekaa Valley. Within two hours, the IAF had destroyed 29 of 30 Syrian missile batteries deployed in the Beqaa Valley, and shot down more than 82 of the 100 Syrian aircraft, primarily MiG-21 and MiG-2 fighters. All 90 of Israel's aircraft (mostly F-15 and F-16s) completed their missions, with the loss limited to damage to two aircraft.
- The United Kingdom introduced its twenty pence (20p or £0.20) coin.
- In Switzerland's top-level professional soccer football league, Nationalliga A, Grasshopper Club Zurich finished in first place with a 21–7–2 record and 49 points, with Servette FC Geneve (20–6–4) of Geneva and FC Zürich (18–10–2) in second at 46 points.
- Boldklubben af 1893 (called "B.93") defeated Boldklubben 1903 ("B 1903"), 1 to 0, to win Denmark's Danish Cup, after the title game on May 20 had ended in a 3 to 3 draw.
- Born:
  - Yoshito Ōkubo, Japanese footballer with 60 caps for the Japan national team; in Kanda, Fukuoka
  - Timmy Trumpet (stage name for Timothy Jude Smith), Australian jazz musician and record producer; in Sydney
- Died:
  - Mirza Nasir Ahmad, 72, Pakistani Muslim cleric and the Caliph of the Ahmadiyya Muslim Community since 1965
  - Chittadhar Hridaya, 76, Nepalese poet, died after collapsing while he was presiding over a meeting of other authors.
  - Richard St. Barbe Baker, 92, English reforestation activist and Baha'i Faith adherent who created the International Tree Foundation

== June 10, 1982 (Thursday) ==
- In the worst friendly fire incident in the history of the Israeli Defense Forces (IDF), 24 soldiers were killed and 108 wounded when the pilot of an Israeli Air Force Phantom fighter mistook a column of the Israeli Ground Force's Nahal Brigade, believing that he was attacking a Syrian Army commando unit.
- The Battle of Sultan Yacoub began in Lebanon's Bekaa Valley between the Israeli Ground Forces and the Syrian Army, and proved to be disaster for Israel, with 30 soldiers killed and five soldiers missing in action, as well as the destruction of 10 tanks and three armored personnel carriers. The Syrian losses were not reported.
- Elections were held in the Bahamas for the 43 seats of the Bahamian House of Assembly. The Progressive Liberal Party of Prime Minister Lynden Pindling increased its majority to 32 seats, while the Free National Movement, led by Kendal Isaacs, won the other 11.
- Mirza Tahir Ahmad was elected by Muslim clerics as the fourth caliph of the worldwide Ahmadiyya Muslim Community to replace the late Mirza Ghulam Ahmad.
- The American press reported that, as part of the Salvadoran Civil War, 4,000 troops of the Salvadoran Army carried out a "cleanup" operation in the rebel controlled province of Chalatenango and killed over 600 civilians whom the organizers deemed to be "masas" who were sympathetic with the rebels.
- The Harvey Fierstein play Torch Song Trilogy opened on Broadway at the Little Theatre for the first of 1,222 performances and would win the Tony Award for Best Play and, for Fierstein, Best Actor.
- Born:
  - Tara Lipinski, American figure skater and 1998 Olympic gold medalist; in Philadelphia
  - Laleh Pourkarim, Iranian-born Swedish singer; in Bandar-e Anzali
- Died:
  - Rainer Werner Fassbinder, 37, West German filmmaker, died from an accidental overdose of cocaine and barbiturates. He was known for Händler der vier Jahreszeiten (The Merchant of Four Seasons) in 1972; Angst essen Seele auf (marketed in English language as Ali: Fear Eats the Soul) in 1974; and Die Ehe der Maria Braun (The Marriage of Maria Braun) in 1979.
  - Giuseppina Aliverti, 87, Italian geophysicist known for her development of the Aliverti-Lovera method for measuring the radioactivity of water and for the Aliverti-Lovera cosmic radiation meter
  - Dr. Faye Cashatt Lewis, 86, American physician and author
  - Daisy Burrell, 89, English stage and silent film actress
  - Addie "Micki" Harris, 41, founding member of the R&B group The Shirelles, died hours after collapsing from a heart attack after two performances by the group in Atlanta.
  - Christelle Bancourt, 12, French kidnapping and murder victim

== June 11, 1982 (Friday) ==
- The film E.T.: The Extra-Terrestrial premiered and, after a quiet start, would go on to will become the biggest box-office hit for the next 11 years. Directed by Steven Spielberg, the film was about an alien space traveler being sheltered by a 10-year-old boy after being stranded on Earth in a crash.
- In one of the most anticipated bouts in boxing history, defending WBC heavyweight champion Larry Holmes fought the WBC's number one challenger, Gerry Cooney, in front of 29,214 spectators at Caesars Palace in Las Vegas. Going into the meeting, both were unbeaten in their professional boxing careers, with Holmes having 39 wins, 29 of them by knockout, and no losses, and Cooney having a 25–0 record, with 21 wins by knockout. In the 13th round of 15 scheduled, Cooney was against the ropes and his trainer, Victor Valle, threw in the towel to quit the fight.
- Voting for all 62 of the elected seats of the 70-seat, unicameral Lasanble Nasional were held in Mauritius. Sir Seewoosagur Ramgoolam of the Labour Party, who had been the nation's only prime minister since its independence in 1967, saw his coalition government lose nearly all its seats to the Mauritian Militant Movement (MMM) party, led by Anerood Jugnauth, which won 42 seats while the MMM's partner, the Parti Socialiste Mauricien (PSM) won the other 18 elected seats. Jugnauth then formed a government as the new prime minister.
- The governments of Israel and Syria announced that they had agreed to a ceasefire in the Lebanon War, to take effect at 12:00 noon. Minutes before the ceasefire was to start, the Syrians moved a column of T-72 tanks into position in the Bekaa Valley, and Israel's infantry destroyed 11 of the tanks, while its air force shot down 18 Syrian jets.
- Born: Diana Taurasi, American women's professional basketball player for the Phoenix Mercury, and the all time scorer for the WNBA, the league's MVP in 2009, and winner of six Olympic gold medals (2004, 2008, 2012, 2016, 2020 and 2024) for the U.S. national team; in Glendale, California. Both had been paid $10,000,000 to participate
- Died:
  - Santosh Kumar (stage name for Syed Musa Abbas Raza), 56, Pakistani film actor and producer, known for starring in romances such as Qatil (1955); Intezaar (1956) and Ghunghat (1962)
  - Anatoly Solonitsyn, 47, Soviet Russian film actor known for Andrei Rublev (1977) and Twenty Six Days from the Life of Dostoyevsky (1980), died from lung cancer.
  - H. Radclyffe Roberts, 76, American entomologist known for his describing multiple species of grasshoppers and for co-authoring The Mosquito Atlas; among the many insects named in his honor are the salamander Pseudoeurycea robertsi and Sarcohyla robertsorum

== June 12, 1982 (Saturday) ==
- The Nuclear Disarmament Rally, an event against nuclear weapon proliferation, drew 750,000 people to New York City's Central Park for the largest political protest in American history. Performers at a free concert included Jackson Browne, James Taylor, Bruce Springsteen and Linda Ronstadt. An international convocation, held afterward at the Cathedral of St. John the Divine, featured prominent peace activists from around the world and a march along Fifth Avenue to Central Park for the rally.
- The crash of a Brazilian airliner killed all 44 people on board. The Fairchild FH-227 turboprop, on a flight for Transportes Aéreos Regionais da Bacia Amazônica (TABA) airlines, was making its approach to Tabatinga after taking off from Eirunepé in the state of Amazonas. On landing in bad weather, it struck a lighting tower on the runway, crashed in a parking lot, and exploded.
- The two-day Battle of Mount Longdon, fought after British forces had come ashore at East Falkland island, which had been captured by Argentina, ended with the British Army capturing the strategic location above Port Stanley. In the course of fighting, 31 Argentines were killed and 120 wounded, while the British sustained 23 killed and 60 wounded.
- Barry Petersen of the CBS Evening News made the first report by a national network of a new, unnamed disease which was described at the time as "gay cancer". Introduced by anchor Dan Rather (who said "Federal officials consider it an epidemic, yet you rarely hear a thing about it," Petersen interviewed gay community members Bobbi Campbell, Larry Kramer and Marcus Conant, and a CDC scientist, Dr. James Curran, in the report.
- Canada began its first nationwide lottery game that allowed players to choose their own numbers, Lotto 6/49. While there had been three previous Canadian lotteries, those sold tickets with pre-printed numbers.
- In Bulgaria, the Cup of the Soviet Army, the championship tournament of the highest level of Bulgarian soccer football, was won by Lokomotiv Sofia, 2 to 1, over Lokomotiv Plovdiv, after extra time. The match was played at the Bulgarian city of Pleven before 8,000 people.

== June 13, 1982 (Sunday) ==
- Crown Prince Fahd bin Abdulaziz Al Saud became the new King of Saudi Arabia upon the death of his brother, King Khalid. King Fahd would reign for 23 years until his death in 2005, and be succeeded by his younger brother Abdullah of Saudi Arabia.
- The 1982 FIFA World Cup began in Spain with teams from 24 nations competing, and opened at 9:00 pm local time with a match before 95,000 people at the Camp Nou stadium in Barcelona. Belgium defeated Argentina, 1 to 0.
- The first international women's rugby union match was played, as the French national team won, 4 to 0 over the host, the Dutch national team, in a game in Utrecht. Isabelle Decamp of France made the match's only score, on a 4-point try.
- Born:
  - Kenenisa Bekele, Ethiopian long-distance runner, Olympic gold medalist in the 10,000m (2004 and 2008) and the 5000m (2004); in Bekoji
  - Ag Apolloni, Kosovan-born Albanian playwright, novelist and poet; in Kaçanik, SR Serbia, Yugoslavia
  - Chris Cusiter, Scottish rugby union player with 70 caps for the Scotland national team; in Aberdeen
  - Avto Kopaliani, Georgian rugby union player with 23 caps for the Georgia national team; in Kutaisi, Georgian SSR, Soviet Union
- Died:
  - Khalid bin Abdulaziz Al Saud, 69, King and Prime Minister of Saudi Arabia since 1975
  - Riccardo Paletti, 23, Italian motor racing driver, was killed in a crash at the 1982 Canadian Grand Prix

== June 14, 1982 (Monday) ==
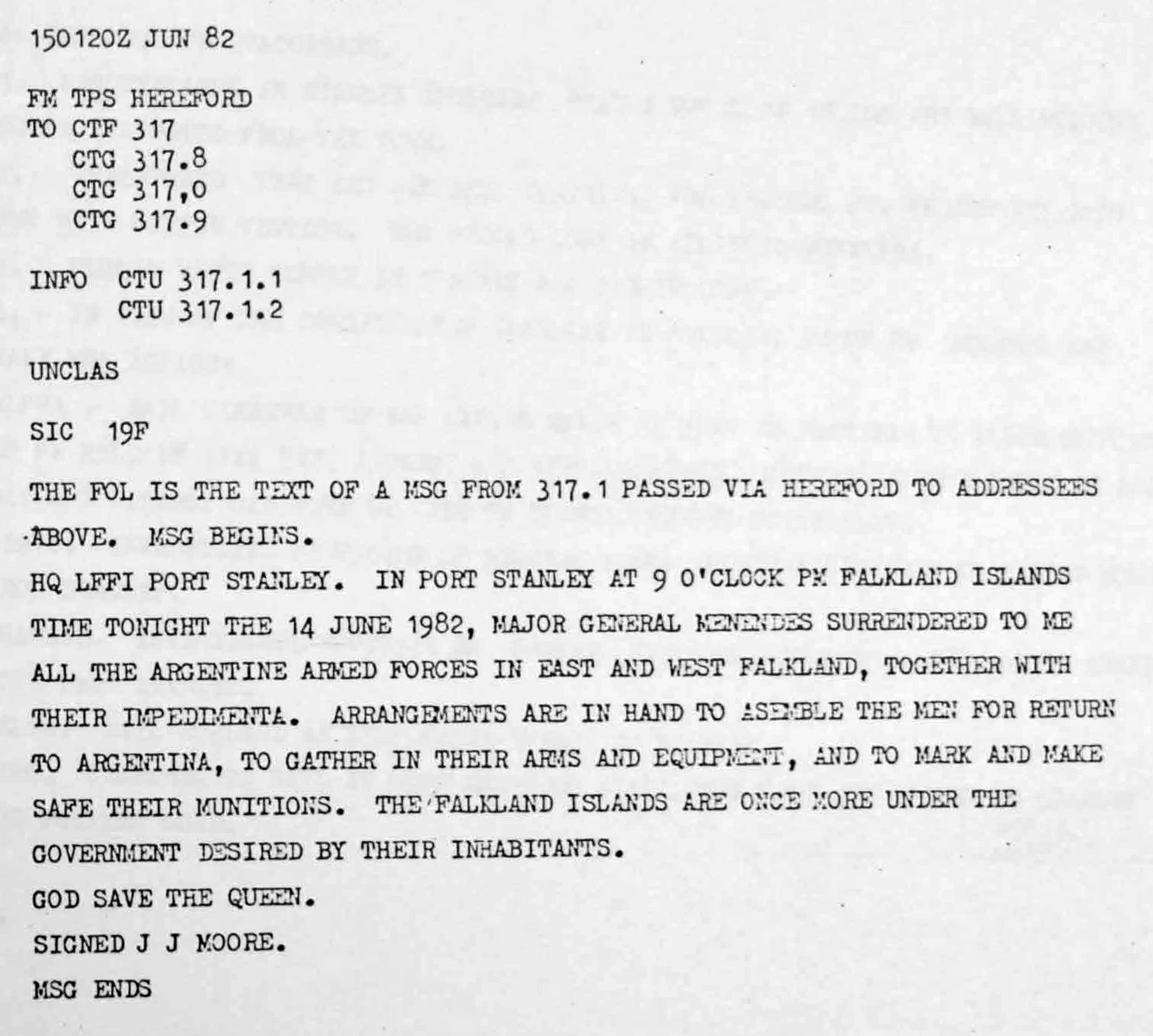
Major General Moore's telegram announcing the Argentine surrender

- At 9:00 at night local time, the Falklands War came to an end after six weeks. with the surrender of Argentine forces at Stanley, the capital of the Falkland Islands. Brigadier General Mario Menéndez, Argentina's designated military governor of the Islas Malvinas (the Argentine name for the Falklands), had disagreed with the order of President Leopoldo Galtieri of Argentina, who wanted the Argentine Army to launch a counter-attack on the British forces and not to give up until, in compliance with the nation's military code, he had "lost 50% of his men and used 75% of his ammunition," and Galtieri added "The responsibility today is with you." General Menéndez then agreed to a request by British Army officers to meet and then surrendered to Royal Army Major General Jeremy Moore, who then notified headquarters that "In Port Stanley at 9 o'clock p.m., Falkland Islands time tonight the 14 June 1982, Major General Menendes surrencered to me all the Argentine Armed Forded in East and West Falkland, together with their impedimenta." In all, 649 Argentine service members and 255 from Britain were killed during the war.
- The siege of Beirut began seven days after the start of the war in Lebanon, after the Israeli Defense Forces had surrounded Lebanon's capital and the Palestine Liberation Organization and Syrian fighters still inside. For the next seven weeks, Israel cut off food, water and electricity, and shelled and bombed the neighborhoods suspected of harboring guerrillas, killing thousands of civilians along with the enemy combatants. In the first three weeks after the siege began, more than 500 buildings had been destroyed by Israeli bombing.
- In a featherweight boxing bout between future world champion Barry McGuigan of Ireland and Asimi Mustapha of Nigeria (billed as "Young Ali"), Mustapha was fatally injured when McGuigan knocked him out in the sixth round of the eight-round fight at the Grosvenor House Hotel in London. After being unconscious for six minutes, Mustapha, walked out of the ring but collapsed later.
- Born: Lang Lang, Chinese classical pianist; in Shenyang, Liaoning province
- Died:
  - Mary C. Lobban, 59, British physiologist and specialist on circadian rhythms, died following a stroke.

== June 15, 1982 (Tuesday) ==
- In a game that tied the mark for the worst defeats in a FIFA World Cup soccer football final, El Salvador's national team lost to Hungary, 10 to 1, starting with a goal by Hungary's Tibor Nyilasi in the fourth of 90 minutes. After a 3 to 0 halftime lead, seven Hungarian goals followed in the 50th, 54th, 69th, 70th, 72nd, 76th and 83rd minutes. El Salvador's Luis Ramírez Zapata averted a shutout with a goal in the 64th minute to close the margin to 6–1.
- In the tiny union territory of Mizoram of India, representatives of various church denominations met at the invitation of the Governor, retired Admiral Sourendra Nath Kohli, with the goal of negotiating an end to the violence to civilians from the ongoing war between the Mizo National Front and the government of India, beginning an effort that would end with the signing of the Mizoram Peace Accord in 1986.
- The cabinet of Israel, led by Prime Minister Menachem Begin, voted to approve Begin's proposal that the Israeli Defense Forces be ordered not enter the predominantly Muslim Palestinian area of West Beirut, and to only allow the Lebanese Forces to police the area.
- The day after Argentina's surrender in the Falklands War, the Royal Navy ship HMS Avenger arrived and members of 40 Commando of the Royal Marines freed 14 Britons who had been deported to Fox Bay by the Argentine Army on April 27.
- Died:
  - Gottfried Kolditz, 59, East German film director, died in Yugoslavia at Dubrovnik while scouting locations for his next film, Der Scout. He was noted for his series of "Osterns", Communist productions of Western films with plots set in the 19th century "Wild West" of the United States, including Spur des Falken (Trail of the Falcon), Apachen (Apaches) and Ulzana , as well as a science fiction film, Signale – Ein Weltraumabenteuer (Signals – A Space Adventure)
  - Art Pepper, 56, American jazz saxophonist, died from a stroke

== June 16, 1982 (Wednesday) ==
- An Israeli Navy submarine killed 25 civilians on the Lebanese ship Transit, which was carrying 56 Palestinian refugees and an undisclosed number of crew and was on its way to Cyprus. The commander of the submarine told a review board that he had believed that the ship was evacuating combatants in the Lebanon War, and fired two torpedoes at the Lebanese vessel. The Israeli Navy would disclose its role in the incident more than 35 years later in 2018.
- At Palermo on the Italian island of Sicily, a gang war attack on imprisoned crime boss Alfio Ferlito killed Ferlito, a driver, and all three Italian carabineri police who had been assigned to guard him while he was being transported from Enna to a prison in Trapani.
- Born: Simaria Mendes Rocha, Brazilian singer and half of the duo of Simone & Simaria with her sister Simone Mendes Rocha Diniz; in Uibaí, Bahia state.
- Died:
  - James Honeyman-Scott, 25, English rock music guitarist, songwriter and founding member for The Pretenders, died of heart failure from a reaction to cocaine.
  - Gwen Wakeling, 81, American costume designer for film and 1951 Academy Award winner

== June 17, 1982 (Thursday) ==
- Argentina's dictator and president, Lieutenant General Leopoldo Galtieri, announced, under pressure from the ruling military junta, his resignation three days after the nation's defeat in the Falklands War. Major General Alfredo Oscar Saint Jean was named to temporarily serve as acting president. Galtieri told the press, "I am going because the army did not give me the political support to continue as commander and President of the nation. I am not one of those who abandon the ship in the middle of tempests or difficult hours such as those the nation is living in today. The people of the nation know this."
- Four mountain climbers— Mon Ruiz, Kim Valino, Roel Tan Torres and Edwin Gatia— became the first persons to reach the top of the 6,752 feet (2,058 m) tall Mount Guiting-Guiting in the Philippines.
- The Cleveland Press, an American daily newspaper that had been published in Cleveland, Ohio, for almost 104 years, delivered its final issue. The lead of the story read "The Cleveland Press, one of the nation's oldest newspapers and an important voice in Greater Cleveland for more than a century, ceased publication with today's editions.
- In Rome, Israel's intelligence agency, the Mossad, carried out two assassinations of Palestine Liberation Organization (PLO) officials whom they believed to have been associated with the 1972 Munich Olympics massacre of the Israeli Olympic team. Nazeyh Mayer was shot dead outside his home, while Kamal Husain, deputy director of the PLO office in Rome, was killed seven hours later by a shrapnel bomb placed under the back seat of his car.
- Born:
  - Jodie Whittaker, English television actress known for portraying the 13th Doctor in the Doctor Who TV series, and the first woman in the title role, from 2017 to 2022; in Skelmanthorpe, West Yorkshire
  - Arthur Darvill, English television and stage actor known for being aide to the 11th Doctor in the Doctor Who TV series from, 2010 to 2012, and winner of the Laurence Olivier Award for Best Actor in a Musical; in Birmingham
- Died:
  - Roberto Calvi, 62, Italian banker, was murdered by hanging after fleeing to London in the wake of the 1981 collapse of the Banco Ambrosiano.
  - Helene Ollendorff Curth, 83, German-born American dermatologist known devising for Curth's criteria for associating skin signs as markers for internal cancers, and for identifying the Buschke–Ollendorff syndrome
  - Betty Harkness, 67, American philanthropist who founded the Harkness Ballet in 1947

== June 18, 1982 (Friday) ==
- The Soviet Union launched Kosmos 1379, described as a "combat satellite", for its final demonstration of its anti-satellite capability, and intercepted (and, according to some accounts, destroyed) Kosmos 1375, which the Soviets had put into low Earth orbit 12 days earlier. The demonstration was part of the largest Soviet nuclear exercise in history, referred to by the U.S. Department of Defense as "a seven-hour nuclear war", that included the launch of several unarmed intercontinental ballistic missiles and submarine-launched ballistic missiles.
- Born:
  - Diana Munz, American swimmer and 2000 Olympic gold medalist; in Cleveland
  - Po-Shen Loh, American mathematician and educator
- Died:
  - John Cheever, 70, American novelist known for The Wapshot Chronicle (1957), Falconer (1977) and for his posthumously published Oh What a Paradise It Seems, died from lung cancer that had metastasized to other parts of his body.
  - U.S. Navy Vice Admiral Roscoe H. Hillenkoetter, 85, the first Director of the Central Intelligence Agency (CIA) on its founding in 1947
  - Curt Jurgens, 66, German-born Austrian stage and film actor
  - Keith Aickin, 66, associate justice of the High Court of Australia, the highest court in that nation, since 1976, died from a heart attack at home, 12 days after being seriously injured in a car accident.
  - Djuna Barnes, 90, American novelist known for her 1936 lesbian fiction book Nightwood

== June 19, 1982 (Saturday) ==
- The People's Armed Police (PAP), a paramilitary organization for the Central Military Commission of the Chinese Communist Party, was created in the People's Republic of China as an internal security force that now has 1.5 million officers.
- Panathinaikos F.C. of Athens won the Greek Cup, the professional soccer football championship of Greece, with a 1 to 0 victory over AEL of Larissa Panathinaikos had finished second in the Alpha Ethniki (Division "A") in the regular season with only three losses and an overall record of 19–12–3, while AEL had more losses than wins, with a record of 12–7–15
- Born: El Chapo Isidro (alias for Fausto Meza Flores), Mexican drug lord and leader of Los Mazatlecos, the enforcers of the Cártel de los Beltrán Leyva (CBL) since 2009; in Navojoa, Sinaloa state
- Died: Lidia Zamkow, 63, Polish film director and actress

== June 20, 1982 (Sunday) ==
- Days after Iran had recaptured the port of Khorramshahr from Iran in the ongoing Iran-Iraq War, Iraqi President Saddam Hussein announced that he had ordered Iraqi troops to begin withdrawing from Iranian territory that had been occupied since the Iraqi invasion in 1980, and proposed a cease-fire. The next day, the leader of Iran, the Ayatollah Khomeini said in a radio broadcast that the war with Iraq would not end even after the withdrawal.
- Six days after the surrender of Argentina in the Falklands War, the last Argentine presence on Britain's overseas territory of the South Sandwich Islands came to an end as the nine remaining Argentine Navy troops, and one Argentine civilian, left the Corbeta Uruguay base on Morrell Island left without resistance. The 10 men were then evacuated by Britain's Royal Marines to an oil tanker and taken to South Georgia island. Britain then declared an end to all hostilities against Argentina. On June 15, Argentine Navy Lieutenant Commander Enrique Félix Peralta Martínez had been sent a message from the Navy, instructing him to maintain the base as a "scientific and communication station", to object to British demands to evacuate and to lodge a formal protest with the British government, as well as to destroy all scientific and communications equipment.
- St. Crispin of Viterbo (originally Pietro Fioretti, 1668–1750), Italian Roman Catholic priest from the Order of Friars Minor Capuchin, became the first person to be canonized by Pope John Paul II as a saint in the Roman Catholic Church.
- Born:
  - Necar Zadegan, German stage and TV actress known for 24 and NCIS: New Orleans; in Heidelberg, West Germany
  - Example (stage name for Elliot Gleave), British rap artist; in Hammersmith, London
- Died:
  - Alvin W. Stokes, 77, African-American investigator for the House Un-American Activities Committee from 1945 to 1954
  - Ralph Moody, 83, American writer known his Little Britches series of autobiographical accounts

== June 21, 1982 (Monday) ==
- John Hinckley Jr., on trial for charges arising from his assassination attempt on U.S. President Ronald Reagan, was found not guilty by reason of insanity on all 13 counts. After four days of deliberation by a U.S. District Court jury in Washington D.C., the verdict was announced at 7:52 p.m. local time, following the defense made by his attorney, Vincent Fuller. Although not imprisoned, Hinckley was confined to the psychiatric ward at Washington's St. Elizabeths Hospital and would remain there for 40 years until being unconditionally released on June 15, 2022.
- The crash of Air India Flight 403 killed 17 of the 111 people on board. The Boeing 707, Air India's first jetliner, was arriving at Bombay (now Mumbai) after a flight from Kuala Lumpur and made a hard landing when the pilot attempted to lift off again to try a second landing, but overran the runway.

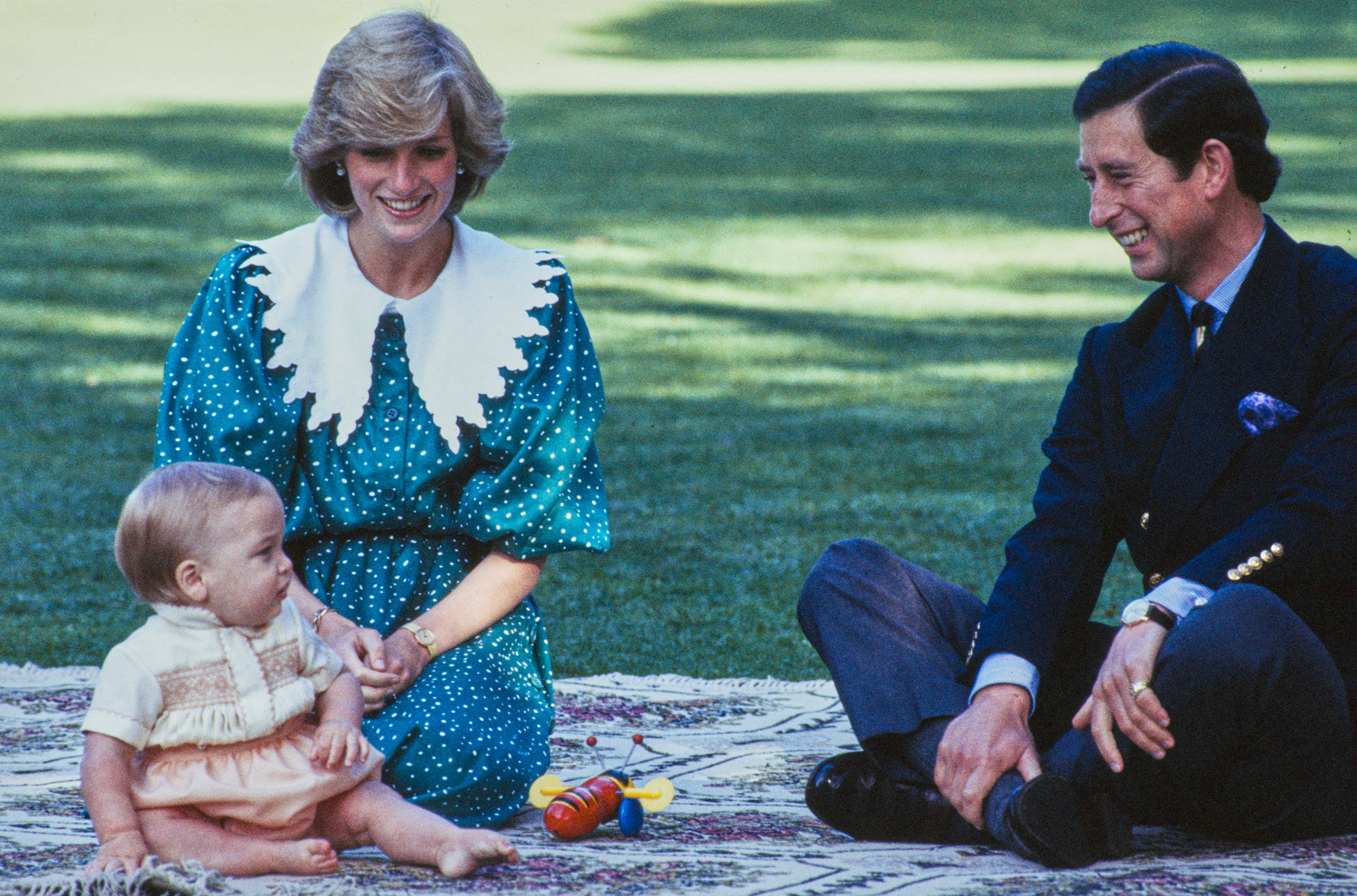
Prince William with his parents, Princess Diana and Prince Charles

- Satellite News Channel (SNC) was launched as a joint venture of ABC Video Enterprises and Group W as a competitor to the two-year-old Cable News Network. With the slogan "Give us 18 minutes, we'll give you the world," SNC would operate for 16 months before ceasing operations on October 27, 1983, after being purhcaesed for $25 million by CNN.
- Born: William, Prince of Wales, heir apparent to the British throne as the first son of King Charles III and of the late Princess Diana, and the future King William V, was born at 9:03 p.m. at St Mary's Hospital, London; in London

== June 22, 1982 (Tuesday) ==
- The Perth Mint Swindle took place with the theft of 49 gold bars, weighing 69 kilograms (2,200 ozt) from the Perth Mint in Australia. While three brothers would be arrested for the theft of the gold bullion worth $653,000 Australian dollars at the time (equivalent to about US$668,500 or £387,000 GBP), they would be cleared and their convictions reversed, and nobody else would be charged.
- The Coca-Cola Company expanded beyond beverages with a purchase of Columbia Pictures film production company for $750 million.
- A government in exile for Cambodia, the Coalition Government of Democratic Kampuchea, was established by the former Cambodian monarch Norodom Sihanouk, the Communist Khmer Rouge leader Khieu Samphan (who had formerly served as head of state during the Cambodian genocide in Democratic Kampuchea), and the former anti-Communist Cambodian Prime Minister Son Sann, with a goal of recovering the Vietnamese-controlled puppet state, the People's Republic of Kampuchea, led by Heng Samrin after Vietnam's conquest of Cambodia in 1979. Notwithstanding the role of the Khmer Rouge in the deaths of two million Cambodians, the United Nations elected to recognize the government-in-exile as the legitimate government until 1993.
- Born:
  - Karan Grover, Indian Hindi television actor and producer known for Saarrthi, Yahan Main Ghar Ghar Kheli ("I Spent My Childhood Here") and Bahu Hamari Rajni Kant ("Our Daughter-in-law Rajni Kant"); in Dehradun, Uttar Pradesh
  - Soraia Chaves, Portuguese film and television actress, known for co-starring in O Crime do Padre Amaro (2005); in Lisbon
  - Luming Lu, Taiwanese film score composer; in Pingtung City
- Died:
  - Martim Francisco, 54, Brazilian soccer football manager credited, in part, with perfecting the 4–2–4 formation for goal defense, died from an alcohol-related illness.
  - Alan Webb, 75, British stage actor and director

== June 23, 1982 (Wednesday) ==
- The high-speed Tōhoku Shinkansen railway line began service in Japan with the opening of its first line, running between Ōmiya in the Saitama Prefecture near Tokyo, and Morioka in Iwate Prefecture 298 miles (480 km) away, and capable of reaching speeds as high as 200 miles per hour (320 km/h).
- The lowest temperature recorded on Earth was measured at the Amundsen–Scott South Pole Station, with a low of −82.8 °C (−117.0 °F), a record which would be broken 13 months later on July 21, 1983, with a low of −89.2 °C (−128.6 °F).
- The Intelligence Identities Protection Act was signed into law by U.S. President Ronald Reagan, making the revelation, of the identity of a U.S. intelligence agent, a felony under federal law. The Act had passed the U.S. House of Representatives, 319 to 36, and the U.S. Senate, 81 to 5.
- Born:
  - Luming Lu, Taiwanese film score composer; in Pingtung City
  - Steven Cheung, American campaign manager and, since 2025, the White House Communications Director; in Sacramento County, CaliforniaBade, Rachael; Palmeri, Tara (January 25, 2022). "Schumer strategy leaves some Dems seething". Politico.
- Died: Vincent Chin, 27, Chinese-born American automotive drafter, died four days after a beating in a hate crime by a white Chrysler plant supervisor and a laid-off autoworker.

== June 24, 1982 (Thursday) ==
- British Airways Flight 9 temporarily became the world's heaviest glider after all four of its engines failed when the airliner inadvertently flew into the path of undetected volcanic ash plume from the eruption of Indonesia's Mount Galunggung. Piloted by Eric Moody, the four-engine Beoing 747-236B was on a flight from London in the UK to Auckland in New Zealand and was en route from Kuala Lumpur, Malaysia to Perth, Australia, when it encountered a cloud of fine ash, not detected on radar and not visible because of darkness. At 8:42 p.m. local time (13:42 UTC), while the airliner was at 37,000 feet (11,000 m) altitude, the number four engine flamed out, followed one minute later by engines 2, 1 and 3. The flight crew calculated that it could glide a distance of 169 kilometres (105 mi) over 23 minutes. Thirteen minutes after all four engines failed, the crew was able to restart one engine and Moody reduced the rate of descent, and soon had all four engines functioning, after which Flight 9 safely made an emergency landing at Jakarta's airport with its 248 passengers and 15 crew.
- Jean-Loup Chrétien became the first Frenchman to travel into outer space when he was launched on the Soviet Soyuz T-6 along with veteran Soviet cosmonauts Vladimir Dzhanibekov and Aleksandr Ivanchenkov to the Salyut 7 space station. For distinction between the English term "astronaut" and Russian term "cosmonaut", the French media dubbed Chrétien a "spationaute".
- Born:
  - Natasa Dusev-Janics, Serbian-born and Hungarian Olympic gold medalist in the canoe sprint women's event in 2004 and 2008; in Bačka Palanka, SR Serbia, Yugoslavia
  - Joanna Kulig, Polish film and TV actress, star of Wednesday, Thursday Morning (2007), and the TV situation comedy O mnie się nie martw (Don't Worry About Me) from 2014 to 2021; in Krynica-Zdrój
  - Laura Donnelly, Northern Irish stage actress on West End and Broadway productions, 2018 Laurence Olivier Award winner for Best Actress in The Ferryman; in Belfast
- Died:
  - B. S. Perera, 58, Sri Lankan film actor and director
  - Vic Huxley, 75, Australian motorcycle speedway rider
  - Shneur Kotler, 63, Soviet Russian dissident and Ashkenazi Jewish rabbi

== June 25, 1982 (Friday) ==
- The "Disgrace of Gijón" took place in competition in the World Cup, at a controversial game played in Spain at Gijón. The game between West Germany and Austria came days after Algeria had defeated West Germany, 2 to 1, in an upset victory. With Austria and Algeria both tied at 2 wins in the standings, and West Germany needing to defeat Austria by no more than two goals for both teams to advance to the quarter-finals, the two European teams slowed down play for the remaining 80 minutes after West Germany took a 1 to 0 lead, and was criticized worldwide as what appeared to be match fixing. An investigation by FIFA concluded that neither team had violated existing rules.
- Kim Sang-hyup took office as Prime Minister of South Korea upon the resignation, the day before, of Prime Minister Yoo Chang-soon.
- U.S. Secretary of State Alexander Haig submitted his resignation to President Ronald Reagan. While Haig had threatened to resign previously in his tenure at the State Department, and been asked to stay, President Reagan decided to accept the resignation on July 5.
- Lee Rotatori, a 32-year old hospital employee, was found stabbed to death in her motel room in Council Bluffs, Iowa. Her killer would remain unknown for 39 years until his identification by investigative genetic genealogy as Thomas Oscar Freeman, who had become a murder victim in July, 1982, a few weeks after the murder. Shot multiple times, his decomposing body had been found in a shallow grave on October 30, 1982, four months after he had killed Rotatori. By the time that Freeman was identified, police suspected that his killer had been Ms. Rotatori's husband, who had died two years earlier, in 2019.
- The Ridley Scott science fiction film Blade Runner premiered in the United States. Set in the then-future year of 2019 and starring Harrison Ford, Blade Runner was initially unsuccessful but would go on to become a popular cult classic and be selected for preservation by the U.S. National Film Registry.
- Born: Rain (stage name for Jung Ji-hoon), South Korean singer and actor; in Seosan
- Died:
  - Ed Hamm, 76, U.S. Olympic gold medalist in the long jump in 1928, described as "The South's first world champion in any sport"
  - Harold Orlob, 99, American composer and lyricist
  - Major General Frank O'Driscoll Hunter, 87, U.S. fighter ace in World War One, credited with downing nine enemy aircraft
  - Daisy Curwen (later, Margaret Wright), 92, British swimmer who held the world record for fastest speed in the 100m freestyle competition, but whose appearance in the 1912 Summer Olympics was halted by appendicitis.

== June 26, 1982 (Saturday) ==
- In the first U.S. trial to introduce videotape as evidence, pornographic film actor John C. Holmes was acquitted of all charges arising from the 1981 murder of four drug dealers, although he was found guilty of contempt of court.
- Lauries Panther won the English Greyhound Derby, held at London in White City Stadium, running the 500m track in 29.60 seconds, and finishing 0.04 seconds sooner than the runner up, Special Account.
- Born:
  - Uresha Ravihari, Sri Lankan singer and award-winning female vocalist in Sinhalese language cinema; in Nugegoda
  - B. K. Samant, Indian folk singer; in Singda village, Champawat district, Uttarakhand state

== June 27, 1982 (Sunday) ==
- The fourth launch of a Space Shuttle mission, and the last of four test flights, began in the U.S. as the Columbia was launched from Cape Canaveral at 10:00 a.m. local time (1500 UTC) with astronauts Ken Mattingly and Henry Hartsfield. Columbia would return to Earth on July 4 and land at Edwards Air Force Base in California.
- The dance musical revue Dancin', directed and choreographed by Bob Fosse, closed after its 1,774th and final performance, after having premiered four years earlier on March 27, 1978.
- Born: Yassine Belattar, French comedian and radio host of Moroccan descent; in Conflans-Sainte-Honorine, Yvelines département

== June 28, 1982 (Monday) ==
- All 132 people on Aeroflot Flight 8641 were killed after departing from Leningrad to Kiev within the Soviet Union. The Yak-42 jet airliner was making its descent toward Kiev when it began a steep dive and began coming apart 30 seconds later at an altitude of 18,700 feet (5,700 m) at a speed of 500 miles per hour (800 km/h). The wreckage was scattered over four miles on the outskirts of the village of Verbaviychy in the Byelorussian SSR (now Belarus. The accident was later determined to have been caused by the failure of a jackscrew in the vertical stabilizer, due to metal fatigue and poor maintenance.
- The Australian morning news show Today, broadcast live on weekdays from Sydney, went on the air nationwide on the Nine Network at 5:30 in morning, initially with the title The National Today Show. Hosted originally by journalists Steve Liebmann and Sue Kellaway. It would celebrate its 40th anniversary on the air in 2022, and is the longest running "breakfast television" show in Australia.
- In the United Kingdom, the Oil and Gas (Enterprise) Act 1982 was given royal assent by Queen Elizabeth II after being passed by Parliament, to reverse the nationalization of Britain's national gas industry and oil industry in favor of privatization of the nation's energy resources. The government was empowered to sell interests in the British National Oil Corporation (BNOC) and the British Gas Corporation to private investors.
- The first, and only nuclear reactor in Malaysia, Reaktor Triga Puspati (RTP), achieved criticality for the first time after being developed by Agensi Nuklear Malaysia (ANM). The reactor is located remotely at Bangi, Selangor.
- A 19-year-old woman, Naomi Lee Kidder, disappeared after going hitchhiking and became the earliest suspected victim out of at least 40 of serial killer Larry DeWayne Hall, who initially confessed to the murders, then recanted. Kidder's remains were found in a shallow grave three months later, though she would not be identified until 1993, after Hall's arrest for another murder.
- Born: Ma Li, Chinese film actress known for being co-star in the comedies Goodbye Mr. Loser (Xià Luò Tè Fánnǎo, in 2015) and Never Say Die (Xiūxiū de tiěquán, in 2017); in Kuandian Town (宽甸镇), Liaoning province, People's Republic of China
- Died:
  - Royal Canadian Navy Rear-Admiral T. Blair McLean, 71, Surgeon General of Canada from 1960 to 1964
  - Adolf Portmann, 85, Swiss zoologist specializing in biosemiotics and theoretical biology,

== June 29, 1982 (Tuesday) ==
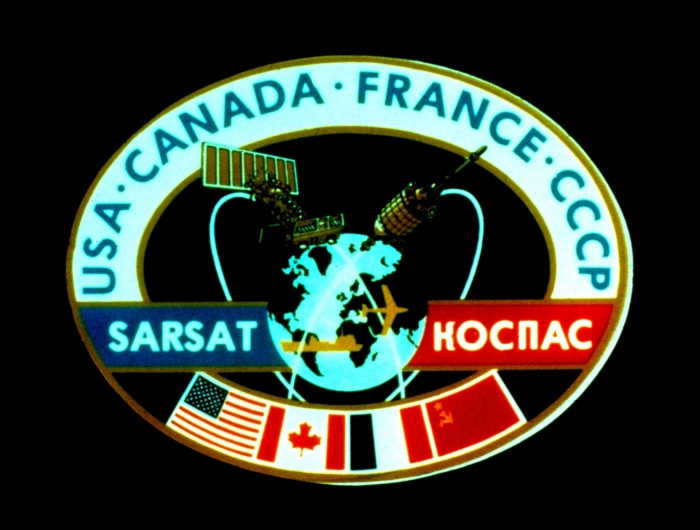
The original SARSAT-KOSMOS logo

- The Soviet Union launched the first of the COSPAS-SARSAT satellites, designed for detecting and locating signals from emergency radio beacons. Kosmos 1383 was launched from Plesetsk at 21:45 UTC (30 July 00:45 local time) and redesignated as COSPAS-1 when it attained orbit. The launch of the satellites was part of an international agreement by Canada, France, the Soviet Union and the U.S. for search and rescue missions. COSPAS is an acronym for the Russian language Cosmicheskaya Sistema Poiska Avariynyh Sudov (Space-based System for Locating Vessels in Distress) and SARSAT for the English language Search and Rescue Satellite-Aided Tracking".
- At Geneva, U.S. President Ronald Reagan formally proposed his proposal for negotiating and agreement with the Soviet Union for reduction of the maximum number of missile-launched nuclear warheads in each nation, followed by a reduction of limits on the total number of aircraft to carry nuclear weapons, as well as other non-missile strategic systems. The Strategic Arms Reduction Treaty, START I, would be signed on July 31, 1991, and enter into force on December 5, 1994.
- Died: Henry King, 96, American film director known for The Song of Bernadette, Twelve O'Clock High (1949) and The Sun Also Rises (1957)

== June 30, 1982 (Wednesday) ==
- Troops from Ethiopia and Somali rebels launched a large-scale invasion of neighboring Somalia in a dispute over the border between the two North African nations as well as an attempt to overthrow Somali's president Siad Barre. The war would continue for 14 months until August 1983, without achieving its goals.
- Three justices of the Supreme Court of Ghana were kidnapped and murdered. along with a retired Ghanaian Army officer, by Ghanaian soldiers who invaded the homes of Justices Cecilia Koranteng-Addow, Frederick Poku Sarkodee and Kwadwo Agyei Agyapong, and retired Major Sam Acquah. and killed them at the shooting range of the nearby Ghana Military Academy at Bundase.
- Alitalia Flight 1790, a Boeing 747 jet airliner with 340 people on board, was hijacked by a Sri Lankan resident of Italy, Sepala Ekanayake, whose visa was not going to be renewed. At New Delhi in India, Ekanayake boarded the Alitalia flight, which was on its way to Tokyo after originating in Rome. When the airliner reached an altitude of 35,000 feet (11,000 m), he threatened to explode bombs on the aircraft if it didn't land in Bangkok in Thailand. He demanded that his wife and son be brought to the Bangkok airport and that he be given US$300,000. When the demand was complied with, he released all passengers. Ekanayake was arrested when he arrived in Sri Lanka, and sentenced to five years in prison.
- U.S. President Ronald Reagan created the Grace Commission to conduct the Private Sector Survey on Cost Control to conduct an investigation of, and recommendations for eliminating, inefficiency and waste in the federal government. In announcing Executive Order 12369, President Reagan said that his goal was to "drain the swamp", a phrase later used for reforming bureaucracy. Prior to creating the Commission, chaired by J. Peter Grace, CEO of the conglomerate W. R. Grace & Co., he advised the members, ""Be bold. We want your team to work like tireless bloodhounds. Don't leave any stone unturned in your search to root out inefficiency."
- GMHC, the oldest AIDS service organization in the world, was founded in the U.S. as Gay Men's Health Crisis, a non-profit, volunteer-supported corporation with a mission to end the epidemic of Acquired Immune Deficiency Syndrome (AIDS)
- Born:
  - Allari Naresh, Indian actor and film producer of in Telugu language cinema, known for Allari (2002) and Betting Bangaraju (2010); in Madras (now Chennai), Tamil Nadu state
  - Lizzy Caplan, American TV actress known for the CBS series The Class (2006–2007) and the Netflix series Zero Day (2025); in Los Angeles
  - Ashley Walters, British rapper who performs as Asher D, and as a film and TV and producer; in Peckham, London
- Died: Russell W. Volckmann, 70, U.S. Army officer who led the guerrilla resistance during the Japanese occupation of the Philippines in World War II, and later co-founded the U.S. Army Special Forces.
