= July 1982 =

Month of 1982

<<	July 1982					>>
Su	Mo	Tu	We	Th	Fr	Sa
				1	2	3
4	5	6	7	8	9	10
11	12	13	14	15	16	17
18	19	20	21	22	23	24
25	26	27	28	29	30	31

The following events occurred in July 1982:

== July 1, 1982 (Thursday) ==
- Ireland's Prime Minister (Taoiseach) Charles Haughey and his government passed a vote of confidence in the Dáil by seven votes, 84 to 77.

== July 2, 1982 (Friday) ==
- Larry Walters, an American truck driver in Los Angeles, attached 42 weather balloons, filled with helium, to a lawnchair and lifted off from San Pedro, California to make a 45-minute flight, reaching an altitude of 16,000 feet (4,900 m) after originally tethering the chair to his jeep. Using a pellet gun, he descended by shooting and deflating individual balloons until he could safely descend to the ground.
- Iranian Shia cleric Ayatollah Mohammad Sadoughi, a representative of Iran's leader, the Ayatollah Khomeini, was assassinated when a grenade was thrown at him after he had finished conducting the Friday Prayer at a mosque in Yazd. Three bystanders were killed in the explosion as well.
- English punk rock singer William Broad, better known by his stage name of Billy Idol, released his first album, which included his first hit song, "White Wedding".
- Died:
  - DeFord Bailey, 82, the first African-American country music star known for performing on the Grand Ole Opry radio show with his white co-star, Uncle Dave Macon and inductee to the Country Music Hall of Fame
  - Tom Jewett, American entrepreneur and pilot, was killed near Mojave, California in the crash of the Quickie Free Enterprise, an airplane which he and Gene Sheehan had designed to fly around the world on a single tank of 1382 litres or 365 U.S. gallons of aviation fuel. |

== July 3, 1982 (Saturday) ==
- Uri Avnery, an Israeli journalist and political activist who had founded the Gush Shalom peace movement, met with Palestine Liberation Organization (PLO) leader Yasser Arafat, after being allowed to cross enemy lines in Beirut. The meeting marked the first time that Arafat had ever had a meeting with an Israeli.
- The bodies of three murdered judges of the Supreme Court of Ghana— Cecilia Koranteng-Addow, Frederick Poku Sarkodee and Kwadwo Agyei Agyapong— along with that of retired Ghana Army Major Sam Acquah. were found in a search of the Bundase Military Range of the Ghana Military Academy near Accra, three days after they had been kidnapped from their homes.

== July 4, 1982 (Sunday) ==
- Antonio Guzmán Fernández, the President of the Dominican Republic since 1978, shot himself in the head at the National Palace, the presidential residence and offices, in Santo Domingo. Guzman had six weeks left in his term after deciding not to run for re-election, and had been ill with depression for months. His vice president, Jacobo Majluta was sworn into office the next day and served out Guzman's term until August 16, when he turned the office over to the newly-elected president, Salvador Jorge Blanco.
- Elections were held in Mexico for the president, as well as all 64 seats in the Senado de la República and all 400 seats in the Cámara de Diputados. Candidates from Mexico's ruling Partido Revolucionario Institucional (PRI) repeated their wins of the presidency and both houses of the Mexican Congress, with Miguel de la Madrid winning more than 74% of the vote against 16% won by Pablo Emilio Madero of the Partido Acción Nacional (PAN). The PRI also won all 64 of the seats in the Senado and 299 of the 400 seats in the Camara de Diputados.
- Three Iranian diplomats and a reporter for Iran's news agency were kidnapped in the course of the Lebanon War between Israel and Palestinian organizations in Lebanon. Seyed Mohsen Mousavi, the chargé d'affaires at the Iranian embassy in Beirut); Ahmad Motevaselian, an attache at the embassy in Lebanon; and Taghi Rastegar Moghadam, an embassy employee, were returning from Iran's Embassy in Syria, accompanied by Kazem Akhavan, a photojournalist of the Islamic Republic News Agency. The group were last seen in public when they were stopped at a Lebanese Forces checkpoint in northern Lebanon while traveling south from Damascus to Beirut.
- A four-member team, led by Seiichi Kawauchi from the Japanese Alpine Club, became the first people to climb to the top of the 21,040 feet (6,410 m) high Sosbun Brakk mountain in the Karakoram range in Pakistan. The other climbers were Hisao Hashimoto, Mikio Tabata, and Norichika Matsumoto.
- STS-4, the fourth mission of the U.S. Space Shuttle, ended successfully as the shuttle Columbia landed at Edwards Air Force Base in California at 8:09 a.m. local time (1609 UTC). Columbia had been launched from Cape Canaveral in Florida on June 27 with astronauts Ken Mattingly and Henry Hartsfield.
- The first Grand Prix of Cleveland was held on the runways of the Burke Lakefront Airport, which was closed for maintenance, under the name "the Budweiser Cleveland 500", and event on the Championship Auto Racing Teams (CART) circuit. The initial race was won by Bobby Rahal. The race would be discontinued after 2007.
- The American Association Denver Bears set the all-time record for the highest attendance by a Minor League Baseball team when they drew 65,666 spectators to Mile High Stadium for a game against the visiting Omaha Royals.
- Died: Terry Higgins, 37, Welsh disk jockey, and one of the first well-known persons in Britain to die of AIDS.

== July 5, 1982 (Monday) ==
- In the United States, the Penn Square Bank of Oklahoma City, Oklahoma failed after mismanagement of high-risk loans to borrowers against the bank's assets and deposits.

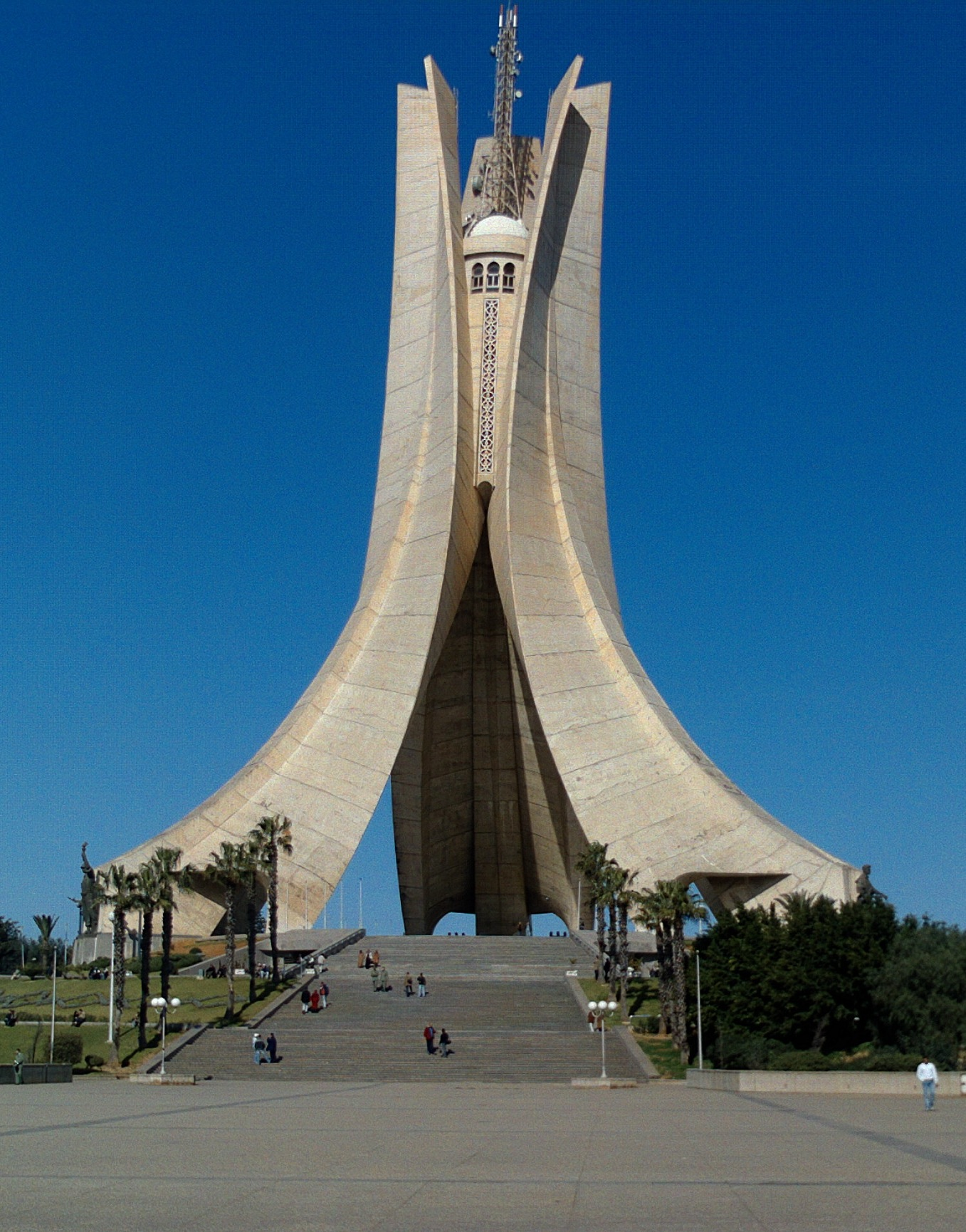
The Algerian memorial

- The Maqam Echahid memorial was dedicated at Algiers to commemorate the 20th anniversary of Algeria's independence from France and to honor the persons killed in the Algerian War.
- Born: Sophie Adenot, French engineer and spationaute known for being launched in the NASA spacecraft SpaceX Crew-12 to the International Space Station; in Cosne-Cours-sur-Loire, Nièvre département

== July 6, 1982 (Tuesday) ==
- The crash of Aeroflot Flight 411 in the Soviet Union killed all 90 people on board. The four-engine Ilyushin Il-62 jet airliner departed from Moscow's Sheremetyevo Airport at 12:33 in the morning local time, with a destination of Darkar in Senegal and a final scheduled stop at Freetown, Sierra Leone. Within seconds after takeoff, the number 1 engine caught fire. A minute later, engine 2 failed at an altitude of only 520 feet (160 m) and the pilot turned the aircraft back toward Moscow with its left two engines gone, but the aircraft stalled at 250 feet (76 m) and crashed into a forest near the town of Mendeleyevo about 7.1 miles (11.4 km) from the airport.
- The longest lunar eclipse of the 20th century (and the longest since 1859), with a total duration of 106 minutes, took place, and was visible over Australia and North and South America.
- El Chico National Park was created in the Pachuca Mountains of Mexico in the state of Hidalgo.
- Died:
  - Raúl Roa García, 75, Foreign Minister of Cuba from 1959 to 1976.
  - Alma Reville, 82, English screenwriter, film editor and widow of Alfred Hitchcock
  - Warren Tufts, 56, American comic strip cartoonist known for Casey Ruggles, was killed in a private plane crash.

== July 7, 1982 (Wednesday) ==
- The daily newspaper The Telegraph began publication in the Indian city of Calcutta (now Kolkata).
- Ogun State University was established in Nigeria and the city of Ago-Iwoye in the West African nation's Ogun State. It would be renamed in 2001 and is now Olabisi Onabanjo University.
- David Moorcroft of Britain broke the world record for the 5000 meter run, completing the five kilometers in 13 minutes and 0.41 seconds at the Bislett Games in Oslo, and breaking the mark of 13:06.20, held for four years by Henry Rono of Kenya.
- Died:
  - Bhakti Hridaya Bon, 81, Hindu Vaishnavist guru
  - Edward Huebsch, 68, American screenwriter and Communist Party member who was blacklisted from 1956 to 1977
  - Vice Admiral Alexandros Sakellariou, 95, leader of the Royal Hellenic Navy during World War II

== July 8, 1982 (Thursday) ==
- "Diet Coke" was formally introduced by the Coca-Cola Company, being put on sale initially in New York City.
- A group of gunmen in the predominantly Shia Muslim city of Dujail carried out an assassination attempt against Iraq's President Saddam Hussein, a Sunni Muslim during a visit. Nearly 800 men, women and children were arrested. Hundreds of others would be deported outside the city. After Saddam had given a speech praising local residents who had served in the ongoing war with neighboring Iran, he was being driven in a motorcade back to the capital at Baghdad when a group of gunmen from the Islamic Dawa Party attacked the group. Two of Saddam's bodyguards were killed, but he was uninjured. For the next four hours, a gun battle continued and most of the attackers were killed, while the survivors were captured and interrogated. Afterwards, arrests were made of hundreds of people in Dujail and the neighboring town of Balad.
- "Operation Sofia", ordered by Guatemalan Army Chief of Staff Héctor Mario López Fuentes, began in the province of El Quiché to eradicate villages whose residents were believed to be harboring leftist rebels. The 1st Battalion of the Guatemalan Airborne Troops carried out a campaign that lasted for six weeks until being finished on August 20.
- With four teams remaining in the FIFA World Cup final tournament in Spain, semifinal games took place between Poland and Italy (in Barcelona) and between West Germany v France (in Seville). West Germany and France were tied, 3 to 3, after extra time. The two teams were tied, 1 to 1 after 90 minutes full time, and each scored two goals in the 30 minute extra time period. For the first time in World Cup history, the penalty shoot-out was used to decide the winner. After five shots apiece, both teams had made 4 goals apiece. On the sixth round of shots, the kick by France's Maxime Bossis was blocked, while West Germany's Horst Hrubesch converted for the 5 to 4 win on penalties.
- The Argentine hit comedy and drama Plata dulce (literally, "sweet silver", a phrase similar to "easy money") was released nationwide in the South American country, and would win the Silver Condor Award for Best Film the following year.
- Born: Alicia Vela-Bailey, American actress and stunt double for actresses in U.S. films
- Died:
  - Virginia Hall, 76, American spy who worked for Britain's Special Operations Executive and the U.S. Office of Strategic Services during World War II, and after the war for the Central Intelligence Agency
  - Isa Miranda (stage name for Ines Isabella Sampietro), 77, Italian film actress
  - Sylvan Byck, 77, American cartoonist who served as editor and evaluator for King Features Syndicate
  - Gunnar Eriksson, 60, Swedish cross-country skier and Olympic gold medalist

== July 9, 1982 (Friday) ==
- Pan Am Flight 759 crashed on takeoff from New Orleans and plummeted into a neighborhood in the New Orleans suburb of Kenner, Louisiana. All 146 people on board were killed, along with and eight others on the ground. With 138 passengers and seven crew, Flight 759 departed from New Orleans at 4:08 p.m. local time, with a destination of Las Vegas, into a heavy thunderstorm and a sudden microburst and, 63 seconds after becoming airborne, impacted at 1624 Fairway Street in Kenner, then across Hudson Street, 17th Street and Taylor Street.
- Michael Fagan, a 33-year-old house painter, scaled a 14 feet (4.3 m) high wall around the perimeter of Buckingham Palace, climbed up a drainpipe on the side of the palace and broke in, wandered into the royal apartment section and invaded the bedroom of Queen Elizabeth II. Despite her calls to the palace switchboard for help, none arrived and she was only able to get a response to the break in after locating a housemaid in the corridor. An investigation later determined that although an alarm sensor had detected Fagan, and although he had been caught one month earlier after breaking into Buckingham, police had ignored the warning in the belief that the alarm system was faulty. Detained by police on a civil charge, Fagan was committed to a psychiatric hospital rather than being jailed.
- General Efraín Ríos Montt, leader of a three-member junta that had overthrown the government of Guatemala on March 23, forced the other two junta members, General Horacio Maldonado Schaad and Colonel Francisco Luis Gordillo, to resign, leaving Ríos as the sole head of state.
- Born:
  - Kozue Ando, Japanese soccer football player with 126 caps for the Japan women's national team; in Utsunomiya, Tochigi Prefecture
  - Toby Kebbell, English film, television and streaming TV actor; in Pontefract, West Yorkshire
- Died: Carlos Almada, 64, Argentine tango music singer

== July 10, 1982 (Saturday) ==
- In the invasion of Somalia, Ethiopian troops overran the border town of Balanbale with more than 30 T-55 tanks and two artillery battalions, and moved 7 miles (11 km) into Somalia. In response, Somali troops made a counter-attack from the city of El Dhere and forced a retreat to Balanbale, which was then fortified. At the same time, MiG jets from the Ethiopian Air Force strafed and bombed the airport at Galkayo.
- A mentally ill U.S. Army soldier, stationed at the U.S. Sullivan Barracks base near Mannheim, West Germany, stole an M60 tank from the barracks at 2:00 in the afternoon and drove it through the city for 90 minutes on a path of destruction, injuring four bystanders, smashing 11 automobiles and a streetcar, and numerous traffic lights and utility poles. Charles S. Keefer, a 20-year-old soldier from Berwick, Pennsylvania ended his rampage by driving through a bridge railing and plunging 39 feet (12 m) into the Neckar River, where he drowned. The property damage was estimated at DM 2,000,000 West German Deutsche Marks, equivalent to $820,000 U.S. dollars at the time.
- Died:
  - Maria Jeritza, 94, Austrian-born American opera soprano described as "the golden girl of opera's golden age" in the first decades of the 20th century
  - G. E. L. Owen, 60, Welsh philosopher and classicist, died from a heart attack.
  - Suzanne Jannin, 69, French resistance fighter in World War II and pilot during the Indochina War, later a dentist

== July 11, 1982 (Sunday) ==
- In Spain, Italy defeated West Germany, 3 to 1, to win the 1982 FIFA World Cup before 90,089 spectators in Madrid. After a scoreless first half, Paolo Rossi scored Italy's first goal in the 57th minute on a penalty kick, followed by Marco Tardelli in the 69th minute and Alessandro Altobelli in the 81st for a 3 to 0 lead in the 81st. West Germany's only goal came from Paul Breitner in the 83rd. Italy's championship win was the first in 44 years and the third overall.

== July 12, 1982 (Monday) ==
- A presidential election was held in India by the Electoral Commission composed of the 4,583 members (756 from the national parliament and 3,827 from the members of the legislative assemblies of India's states and union territories) with a specific number of "weighted votes", based on population of the area represented. The electors overwhelmingly chose Home Affairs Minister Giani Zail Singh of the Congress Party over former Supreme Court judge Hans Raj Khanna for a five year term to run from 1982 to 1987. Zail Singh became the first, and only, Sikh to serve as India's head of state.
- In Kalamazoo, Michigan, the last motor vehicle made by the Checker Motors Company, the primary manufacturer of American taxi cabs, rolled off of the company's factory assembly line.
- India's National Bank for Agriculture and Rural Development (NABARD) began operations as a national supervisor of all of the nation's Regional Rural Banks, State Cooperative Banks and District Central Cooperative Banks.
- The Universidad Iberoamericana (UNIBE) was founded in the Dominican Republic by presidential Decree No. 3371, and would begin operations in Santo Domingo on September 1, 1983.
- Born:
  - Sharath Kamal, Indian table tennis player and 10-time India national champion; in Madras (now Chennai), Tamil Nadu state
  - Andy Kim, U.S. Senator for New Jersey since 2025 and the first American of Korean ancestry to serve in the U.S. Senate; in Boston, Massachusetts
  - Vasile Tofan, Prime Minister of Moldova since 2026; in Vălcineț, Moldavian SSR, Soviet Union (now Moldova)
- Died: Kenneth More, 67, English film actor

== July 13, 1982 (Tuesday) ==
- Iran began Operation Ramadan (on 21 Ramadan 1402 AH), its second counter-invasion of Iraq, with the objective of capturing the Iraqi city of Basra in the course of the Iran–Iraq War. The three-week campaign, with more than 90,000 Iranian troops and more than 300 tanks, began the largest land battle since World War II, waged against more than 80,000 Iraqi troops, and would end on August 3, 1982 without the capture of Basra. Although Iran captured a little more than 19 square miles of Iraqi territory, its strategy of human wave attacks ended in the deaths of 12,000 of its troops and the loss of nearly all of the tanks used in the offensive.
- Operation Mebos, an attack by the South African Defence Force (SADF) against bases of the People's Liberation Army of Namibia (PLAN) in southern Angola with an attack by the SADF on Ongiva and Xangongo, and would continue until August 25, 1982.
- Singapore Airlines Flight 21A, a Boeing 747 with 230 passengers and crew, lost three of its four engines after flying into a cloud of ash generated by the Indonesia's Galunggung volcano, in an incident similar to the June 24 failure of all four engines on British Airways Flight 009. The flight was traveling from Singapore to Melbourne, and although Indonesian authorities were aware of the new eruption, air traffic controllers were not warned. The pilot was able to make an emergency landing, with two of its four engines, at Jakarta.,
- Born: Jess Roskelley, American mountaineer; in Spokane, Washington (killed in avalanche, 1982)
- Died: U.S. Navy Lieutenant Commander Barbara Allen Rainey, 33, the first woman from the U.S. Navy to qualify as a jet pilot, was killed along with Ensign Donald Knowlton while she was instructing him on landings at a field at Evergreen, Alabama

== July 14, 1982 (Wednesday) ==
- U.S. President Ronald Reagan provided the "Six Assurances", delivered to Taiwan (officially the Republic of China) and to the U.S. Congress to clarify that, regardless of negotiations with the People's Republic of China, the U.S. would continue to support Taiwan. The Six Assurances stated that the U.S. would not revise its position in the 1979 Taiwan Relations Act, nor play a role in negotiations between Taiwan and the PRC, or set a date for ending arms sales for Taiwan to defend itself.
- The European Coordinating Committee for Artificial Intelligence (ECCAI), now the European Association for Artificial Intelligence (EurAI) was founded at a meeting of Western European computer scientists at Orsay, a surburb of Paris in France.
  - Jackie Jensen, 55, American baseball player and the American League MVP in 1958
  - Giuseppe Prezzolini, 100, Italian-born American journalist, book author, and philosopher
  - Raman Viswanathan, 82, Indian chest physician and pulmonologist
  - George Tremblay, 71, Canadian-born American pianist and composer and exponent of the twelve-tone technique.

== July 15, 1982 (Thursday) ==
- The failure of Lawn Lake Dam, at the Rocky Mountain National Park, in the U.S. state of Colorado released a massive flood of 30 million cubic feet (850,000 m^{3}) of water, killing three campers in the park and caused $31 million in damage to the town of Estes Park.
- Born:
  - Aamna Sharif, Indian TV actress known for Kahiin to Hoga; in Bombay (now Mumbai)
  - Jeff Sampson, American children's and young adult book author known for the Dragonlance series of books, also known by the pen names Christopher Holt (The Last Dog Series) and as Lukas Ritter (the Monster Slayers series); at the U.S. military base in Nuremberg, West Germany

== July 16, 1982 (Friday) ==
- In New York City, the Reverend Sun Myung Moon was sentenced to 18 months in prison and fined $25,000 for tax fraud and conspiracy to obstruct justice.
- George P. Shultz was unanimously confirmed by the U.S. Senate, 97 to 0, as the new U.S. Secretary of State to succeed Alexander Haig., and would serve until the expiration of President Reagan's term in 1989.
- Died:
  - C. R. Swart, 87, South African politician who served as the last British Governor-General of South Africa (1959-1961) and its first president (1961-1967)
  - Patrick Dewaere, 35, French film actor, shot himself to death.
  - Charles H. Stevens, 90, American pastor who founded what is now Carolina University, as Piedmont Bible Institute.

== July 17, 1982 (Saturday) ==
- Voting for all 52 seats of the House of Representatives of Fiji; the ruling Alliance Party, led by Prime Minister Kamisese Mara, lost eight seats, going from a two-thirds majority (36-16) to a fragile 28 to 24 lead. Jai Ram Reddy of the National Federation Party continued as Leader of the Opposition.
- As the war in Lebanon continued, Israeli Defense Minister Ariel Sharon told a crowd of more than 100,000 people in Tel Aviv that Israeli would offer temporary political asylum to any of the 8,000 Palestinian guerrillas, trapped in Beirut, who were willing to surrender their weapons and renounce their support of the Palestine Liberation Organization, conditioned on having not participated in terrorist acts. At the same rally, Prime Minister Menahem Begin told the crowd that the Palestinians had less than 30 days to take advantage of the amnesty offer.
- Born:
  - Gurbaksh Chahal, Indian-born American internet entrepreneur known for founding Click Agents, BlueLithium, RadiumOne, Gravity4, Taara Labs, RedLotus, and VendorCloud; in Tarn Taran Sahib, Punjab state
  - Matthew Mishory, American film director; in Santa Monica, California

== July 18, 1982 (Sunday) ==
- In the Guatemalan village of Plan de Sánchez, more than 250 women and children were massacred, almost all of them members of the Achi Mayan minority, by members of the Guatemalan paramilitary "civil defense patrol" (PAC).
- The new tonnage regulations of the International Maritime Organization entered into force for all new ships on 18 July 1982, but existing vessels were given a migration period of 12 years to ensure that ships were given reasonable economic safeguards, since port and other dues are charged according to ship's tonnage.
- Born:
  - Priyanka Chopra, Indian actress and film producer, winner of the Miss World beauty pageant, co-star of the 2006 action thriller Don; in Jamshedpur, Bihar state (now in Jharkhand state)
  - Marcin Dołęga, Polish weightlifter and three time world champion in the 105 kilograms (231 lb) weight division ; in Lukow
- Died: Roman Jakobson, 85, Russian linguist< known for postulating the six communication functions (referential, poetic, emotive, conative, phatic and metalingual)

== July 19, 1982 (Monday) ==
- Soviet Ukrainian fencer Vladimir Smirnov was fatally injured in an accident during the 1982 World Fencing Championships in Rome. Smirnov, ranked first in the world was competing for the Soviet team in the quarter-finals of team foil event against second-ranked Matthias Behr of West Germany when Behr's foil blade broke as both fencers were making a simultaneous attack. The broken blade pierced Smirnov's fencing mask, went through his left eye socket and into the frontal lobe of his brain. Smirnov never regained consciousness and died 10 days later at Gemelli University Hospital.
- British mountaineers Tim Hurrell and Steve Brodrick became the first people to climb to the top of Kuksar, a 22,750 feet (6,930 m) high mountain in the Karakoram range of the Himalayas in Pakistan, and Hurrell took photographs and made a diary of the achievement. The next day, as the two men were descending, they were killed by an avalanche and their bodies were found on July 22 by the other two members of their expedition, Tim Hurrell and Steve Brodrick. Hurrell's diary and photos would later be published in a book, A Step Too Far: The Tragic First Ascent of Kuksar
- General Celso Torrelio, President of Bolivia since being installed by military leaders in September, stepped down from office along with his cabinet ministers, after having offered his resignation the day after calling for democratic elections to be held in April 1983. A new three-member junta was installed with Air Force General Angel Mariscal, Army General Natalio Morales, and Navy Vice Admiral Oscar Pammo, who promised to carry out the April elections.
- Died:
  - Hugh Everett III, 51, American quantum physicist, died of a heart attack.
  - Ahmat Acyl, 38, former Foreign Minister of Chad until the June 8 overthrow of the Goukouni Oueddei government, died in exile in Laï when "he was struck by an airplane propeller", his followers announced today. They said the incident was an accident.

== July 20, 1982 (Tuesday) ==
- The Provisional Irish Republican Army terrorist group detonated two bombs in central London, killing eight soldiers and seven horses, and injuring 47 bystanders. At Hyde Park, the Blues and Royals, part of the ceremonial Buckingham Palace guards, were riding on their horses to the Changing of the Guard ceremony. As they passed the park on South Carriage Drive, a nail bomb, planted in a parked Morris Marina automobile and packed with 25 pounds (11 kg) of gelignite and 30 pounds (14 kg) of nails, was detonated by remote control at 10:43 in the morning. Three of the guard were killed at the scene, along with seven horses, and a fourth guard died in hospital three days later. Another 28 guards and civilian bystanders were wounded in the attack
- More than two hours later, at Regent's Park, 30 members of the Band of the Royal Green Jackets were performing a lunchtime concert before a crowd of 120 people. At 12:55 pm, a time bomb that had been planted beneath the bandstand exploded, killing six bandsmen and fatally injuring a seventh, as well as injuring 31 band members and bystanders.
- Died: Muriel Steinbeck, 68, Australian television actress who starred in Network Seven's Autumn Affair, the nation's first television soap opera

== July 21, 1982 (Wednesday) ==
- Bolivian Army General Guido Vildoso Calderón was installed by the South American nation's ruling military junta as the 59th President of Bolivia, in the 10th change of government in the four years since President Hugo Banzer's overthrow on July 21, 1978. Vildoso succeeded Celso Torrelio, who had been forced by the junta to step down on July 19.
- Died: Dave Garroway, American radio and TV host known for being the first anchor for the NBC News program Today, from 1952 to 1961, shot himself to death.

== July 22, 1982 (Thursday) ==
- The "civil gang injunction" was introduced into American law by a court in the U.S. state of California when the Los Angeles Police Department and the city's attorney were able to persuade a judge to enter a temporary restraining order against street gangs (as unincorporated associations), rather than individuals. The order, restricting graffiti, was issued against three Crips gangs (Dogtown, Primera Flats, and the 62nd East Coast Crips) based on investigations of 72 combined members.
- The first launch of the new Pershing II ballistic missile was madein a test from Cape Canaveral Launch Complex 16 in Florida.
- Died:
  - Garry Meadows, 43, Australian game show host known for the Australian versions of The Marriage Game, The Price Is Right and High Rollers, died of a heart attack at work at a Melbourne radio station.
  - Karl-Gottfried Nordmann, 66, German flying ace with 78 victories in World War II and later served as the president of the Mercedes-Benz operations in North America
  - George Lingham, 83, British flying act with six victories in World War One.

== July 23, 1982 (Friday) ==
- The International Whaling Commission voted to end commercial whaling by the end of 1986 whaling season, and to continue for at least five years, because of the extreme depletion of most of the world's whales. As of 2026, the international moratorium remained in effect 40 years after its start.
- In Japan, torrential rain and mudslides killed 322 people, 299 of whom were in Nagasaki prefecture and 23 others in the Kumamoto prefecture.
- A helicopter stunt accident killed actor Vic Morrow and two children, Myca Dinh Le and Renee Shin-Yi Chen, during the filming of Twilight Zone: The Movie near Santa Clarita, California At 2:20 in the morning local time, a Bell UH-1 Iroquois helicopter, "used as a camera platform as well as in an active role in the movie sequence", was hovering 15 feet (4.6 m) above Morrow and the two children, and the directly above special effects explosives which were detonated to simulate "heavy ordinance". The helicopter's tail was engulfed by a fireball and the tail rotor assembly came loose, causing the helicopter to fall on the three actors, two of whom were decapitated by the main rotor blade and the other of whom was crushed. The National Transportation Safety Board determined that "the probable cause of the accident was the detonation of debris-laden high temperature special effects explosion too near to a low flying helicopter," and that "the proximity of the helicopter to the special effects explosions was due to the failure to establish direct communications and coordination between the pilot... and the film director", John Landis.
- Born:
  - Paul Wesley (stage name for Pawel Wasilewski), American television actor known for starring as James T. Kirk in Star Trek: Strange New Worlds since 2022, and in The Vampire Diaries from 2009 to 2017; in New Brunswick, New Jersey
  - Thet Mon Myint (stage name for Zung Cet Mawi), Myanmar film actress known for My Lovely Hate (2016); in Falam, Chin State, Burma
- Died: Larry Mickey, 38, Canadian NHL player for seven teams between 1964 and 1975, committed suicide.

== July 24, 1982 (Saturday) ==
- Ray "Boom Boom" Mancini, holder of the world lightweight championship of the World Boxing Association (WBA) successfully defended his title in a bout against the WBA No. 1 ranked contender, Ernesto España of Venezuela, in Warren, Ohio, near Mancini's U.S. hometown of Youngstown. Despite España's ranking and his record of 35 wins (30 by knockout) and 4 losses, the fight was a mismatch, with Mancini being ranked ahead by the judges in every round, and ending with a technical knockout of España when the bout was stopped with one second left in the sixth round.
- The People's Republic of China (PRC) sent a direct request to Chiang Ching-Kuo, President of the offshore Republic of China (Taiwan) with a letter from Liao Chengzhi, a Chinese Communist Party official who was director of the Party's Overseas Chinese Affairs Office, proposing peace talks and a discussion of "reunification" under the "one country, two systems" model. Liao's letter was published the next day in the Party's newspaper, the People's Daily. President Chiang chose not to respond to the letter.

== July 25, 1982 (Sunday) ==
- Saboteurs, believed to have been agents of the South African Special Forces, carried out an attack on four BAE Hawk fighter jets of the Air Force of Zimbabwe (AFZ) after infiltrating the Thornhill Air Force Base near Gweru and planting time bombs in the aircraft engines. The Hawk fighters had been delivered 10 days before the attack. In response to the attack, Zimbabwe's Prime Minister Robert Mugabe ordered the nation's Central Intelligence Organisation to arrest the AFZ commanders, including Air Marshal Norman Walsh, Air Vice-Marshal Hugh Slatter, and other senior AFZ officers who had authorized the purchae of the Hawk jets. Those arrested were imprisoned and tortured until the following year, when they were released following international pressure.
- Giani Zail Singh was inaugurated to a five-year term as the President of India, becoming the first Sikh to become India's head of state. Singh, the Minister of Home Affairs and former Chief Minister of the state of Punjab, succeeded Neelam Sanjiva Reddy, who had served from 1977 to 1982.
- Born: Brad Renfro, American child actor known for the films The Client (1994) and Tom and Huck (1995); in Knoxville, Tennessee (d. 2008 from a drug overdose)
- Died: Hal Foster, 89, Canadian-born American comic strip artist who created, in 1937, Prince Valiant

== July 26, 1982 (Monday) ==
- Amitabh Bachchan, one of the most popular actors in India, was seriously injured while attempting a stunt in the filming of the Bollywood action movie Coolie. Declared clinically dead on August 2 before his heart was re-started, Bachchan was hospitalized for two several months for his abdominal injuries, included a ruptured spleen and an intestinal perforation. Bachchan was filming a fight scene with co-actor Puneet Issar when he struck the corner of a table. Coolie would become the highest-grossing Indian film of 1983.
- Karen Baldwin, Miss Canada of 1982, was crowned as Miss Universe 1982 in the beauty pageant, held in Lima, Peru, with 77 contestants participating.
- Died: Paul Eldridge, 94, American novelist with 61 published books from 1920 to 1971

== July 27, 1982 (Tuesday) ==
- At a meeting of gay community leaders and activists with the Centers for Disease Control, the CDC agreed to change the name of what it had initially referred to as "gay-related immune deficiency" (GRID) to Acquired Immune Deficiency Syndrome, abbreviated to acronym AIDS, a term that has been used ever since in order to make the distinction that the AIDS virus was not limited to gay people. The CDC had first reported the immune deficiency on June 5, 1981, when it issued a report in its Morbidity and Mortality Weekly Report about unusual clusters of pneumocystis pneumonia (PCP) caused by a form of pneumocystis carinii, identified in five homosexual men in the Los Angeles area.
- At the request of the United States National Security Council (NSC), the advisers to the U.S. president, Central Intelligence Agency (CIA) agent Thomas Tweeten provided the first U.S. support to Iraq during the ongoing Iran–Iraq War, sharing CIA satellite imagery with Iraq's spy agency, the Mukhabarat, of Iranian troop movement.The information proved to be misleading and actually led to Iraq's defeat in a 1986 battle.
- The government of Lebanon declined to renew its 1976 agreement with the Arab League that had permitted troops from Syria to occupy the Middle Eastern nation.
- Mahmoud Alavi, who had served as the Commander of the Iranian Navy from 1979 to 1980 after the creation of the Islamic Republic of Iran and until his arrest on charges of conspiracy with American officials, was released from prison after two years of an eight year sentence.
- Inventor and businessman Edwin H. Land, who had created instant photography in 1948 with the Land Camera and perfected it with the self-developing film for the Polaroid SX-70 camera in 1972, resigned as president of the Polaroid Corporation because of the financial disaster from his Polavision instant movie system.
- Born: Johana Bahamón, Colombian actress and activist who founded the Fundación Acción Interna in 2012 to lobby for the improvement of conditions in Colombian prisons; in Cali
- Died: Kasavubu (ring name for Jimmie Lee Banks), 26, American professional wrestler, died during of a heart attack while undergoing a kidney transplant.

== July 28, 1982 (Wednesday) ==
- The third most popular film of 1982, An Officer and a Gentleman, starring Richard Gere, Debra Winger, David Keith and Louis Gossett Jr. premiered in the United States before being released across the U.S. on August 13, 1982. The film, produced for seven million dollars, earned $190 million in sales, and Gossett would receive the Academy Award for Best Supporting Actor.
- The crash of an overloaded Cessna 414 small airplane in Texas killed all 12 people on board, including Christian music singer Keith Green, shortly after the seven-seat airplane took off from Garden Valley, Texas with four adults and eight children.
- Died: George Kleinsinger, 68, American song composer

== July 29, 1982 (Thursday) ==
- The Salyut 6 orbital space station, which had been in orbit since its launch on September 29, 1977, was de-orbited after having last been occupied on May 22, 1981, when the cosmonauts of Soyuz 40 had undocked and returned to Earth.
- France abolished the government monopoly on all radio and television programming in the republic, and in its territories worldwide, with the enactment of Laww 82-652, permitting private companies to form their own broadcasting ventures for the first time since World War II.
- Ninian Stephen, who had served as a justice of the High Court of Australia since 1977, took office as the 20th Governor-General of Australia.
- The first Ollie's Bargain Outlet discount store was inaugurated with the opening of an outlet in Mechanicsburg, Pennsylvania. The chain, named after its co-founder Oliver "Ollie" Rosenberg, would have more than 600 locations within 40 years after its founding.
- The University of San Francisco (USF) suspended its scandal-ridden men's college basketball program, marking the first time that an American college terminated one of its sports teams because of violation of rules. The President of USF, Reverend John Lo Schiavo, announced the end of the San Francisco Dons program, which did would not play in the 1981-82 season or the three seasons thereafter, and although USF would field a men's basketball team for the 1985-86 season, the program never returned to its quality of play that had led to two NCAA championships.
- Died:
  - Vladimir K. Zworykin, 92, Russian-born American inventor, engineer and television pioneer who invented the cathode-ray tube and other technology used in television transmission and receipt, as well as the electron microscope
  - Toshiyuki "Harold" Sakata, 62, American weightlifter, professional wrestler and film actor best known for portraying "Oddjob" in the 1964 James Bond film Goldfinger
  - Vladimir Smirnov, 28, Soviet Russian fencer, died 10 days after he was fatally injured in the World Fencing Championships.

== July 30, 1982 (Friday) ==
- A security officer for the People's Republic of China, Zheng Yanwu, hijacked a People's Liberation Army Air Force jet that was transporting a delegation from Uganda on a flight to Beijing after a visit in Shanghai. Twenty minutes after takeoff, Zheng rushed into the cockpit with a bottle of gasoline and his own pistol, locked the door from the inside, and demanded that the pilot travel to the island nation of Taiwan and land the plane in Taipei. While the pilot, Lan Dingzhou, initially complied with the hijacker's directions, he turned off the jet's right rudder control and the co-pilot, Zhang Jinghai used the left control switch to gradually guide the aircraft back toward Taiping Lake, while Lan claimed that the plane was flying over the Strait of Taiwan. When Zheng turned to look out a window, Lan and Zhang overpowered him, and the flight navigator, Liu Tejun, killed Zheng with an axe, after which the plane was landed in Nanjing.
- Born:
  - Yvonne Strahovski, Australian actress on streaming television, known for The Handmaid's Tale; in Sydney
  - Victoria Maurette, Argentine film actress and singer known for starring in Left for Dead (2007) and Bulletface (2010); in Buenos Aires
- Died:
  - Geneviève Guitel, 87, French mathematician
  - Frankie Saluto, 75, American clown who, at 3 feet 10 inches (117 cm) height, was billed as the "King of the Midget Clowns" in his 46-year circus career, inductee to the Clown Hall of Fame

== July 31, 1982 (Saturday) ==
- The worst bus crash in France's history killed 46 children and seven adults, near Beaune, Côte-d'Or département. At 1:45 in the morning local time, the bus was on Autoroute A6, transporting 61 children and six adults from Crépy-en-Valois, Oise, to an Alpine summer camp in Aussois, Savoie , when a car cut in front of the vehicle and a pile-up began. The fuel tank of one of the automobiles was ripped open and the spilled fuel ignited, setting six vehicles on fire. Two teachers were able to evacuate 15 children but the rest of the passengers were trapped inside.
- Arístides Royo, who had been President of Panama since 1978, was forced to resign from office by the Panamanian National Guard, controlled by General Rubén Darío Paredes. Vice President Ricardo de la Espriella was installed as the new president.
- Born:
  - DeMarcus Ware, American NFL linebacker and inductee to the Pro Football Hall of Fame; in Auburn, Alabama
  - Michelle Lee, Chinese-born American plastic surgeon; in Shanghai
