= The Wild Country =

1970 film by Robert Totten

- Theatrical release poster
- Directed by: Robert Totten
- Written by: Calvin Clements Jr. Paul Savage
- Produced by: Ron Miller
- Starring: Steve Forrest; Vera Miles
- Cinematography: Frank V. Phillips
- Edited by: Robert Stafford
- Music by: Robert F. Brunner
- Production company: Walt Disney Productions
- Distributed by: Buena Vista Distribution
- Release date: December 15, 1970
- Running time: 100 minutes
- Country: United States
- Language: English
- Box office: $4 million (rentals) (US/Canada)

The Wild Country is a 1970 American Western adventure film directed by Robert Totten and starring Steve Forrest and Vera Miles. It was produced by Walt Disney Productions. The screenplay is based on the Ralph Moody book Little Britches.

== Plot ==
In the late 1880s, Jim and Kate Tanner along with their sons Virgil and Andrew move from Pittsburgh to a farm in Wyoming, where they find the ranch in dilapidated condition. To make matters worse, Jim learns from the trapper Thompson and his Shoshone companion Two Dog that the source of the water for his land runs through property owned by the powerful rancher Ab Cross, meaning Jim is at Ab's mercy. Ab is uncooperative and refuses to stop letting his steers graze on Tanner land. Jim's threat to take Ab to court is met with laughter and Jim is told that there are no laws in their territory.

Later, when Ab learns that Jim is trying to contact the marshal in distant Cheyenne, the two men get into a fight in which Jim is injured but Ab gets knocked out. Ab retaliates by ordering his men to close a dam, cutting off the Tanner family's water supply completely. Virgil tries to unplug the dam, and while rescuing his son from Ab's men Jim is shot in the leg. The Tanner ranch is devastated by a cyclone and Kate is determined to move the family back East, but she is persuaded by Jim and Virgil to stay.

Soon after, the marshal arrives with a court order that requires Ab to open the dam. That night, as the Tanners are celebrating, they realize that their barn is on fire. As they fight the flames, Ab on horseback shoots Jim, kicks away Kate and turns to shoot Jim again, but he himself is shot dead by Virgil. Ab's men are repentant and promise to rebuild the barn, and the Tanners are finally free to live as ranchers in peace.

== Cast ==
- Steve Forrest as Jim Tanner
- Vera Miles as Kate Tanner
- Ron Howard as Virgil Tanner (credited as Ronny Howard)
- Clint Howard as Andrew Tanner
- Dub Taylor as Phil
- Jack Elam as Thompson
- Frank de Kova as Two Dog
- Morgan Woodward as Ab Cross
- Woodrow Chambliss as Dakota
- Karl Swenson as Jensen
- Mills Watson as Feathers

== Production ==
Walt Disney Productions originally bought the rights to Ralph Moody's autobiography Little Britches in the late 1950s, but questions of casting delayed production by ten years. The working title was The Newcomers. It was shot on three working ranches at Jackson Hole, Wyoming.

== Reception ==
Howard Thompson of The New York Times wrote: "That good old reliable, the Walt Disney organization, has done it again, quietly and commendably, with a wholesome, sturdily old-fashioned film of a Western pioneer family titled The Wild Country." Variety noted: "Romancing of Disney producers with frontier family themes for the general audience trade again finds satisfactory fulfillment in this latest effort filming the indomitable American spirit that conquered the West and helped develop a nation." Kevin Thomas of the Los Angeles Times called it "an intelligently written and directed picture" and "one of the best Disney efforts in recent memory". Kenneth Thompson of The Monthly Film Bulletin wrote: "A delightfully old-fashioned combination of Western and pioneering drama, based on the conventional opposition between might and right, and with the honest rancher displaying exemplary tenacity in his determination to achieve a legal settlement of his grievances."

== Release ==
The Wild Country was released through VHS on August 19, 1986. It was also later released through DVD format as a Disney Movie Club exclusive on May 5, 2009.

== See also ==
- List of American films of 1970
