= Taipingqiao Park =

Park in Shanghai, China

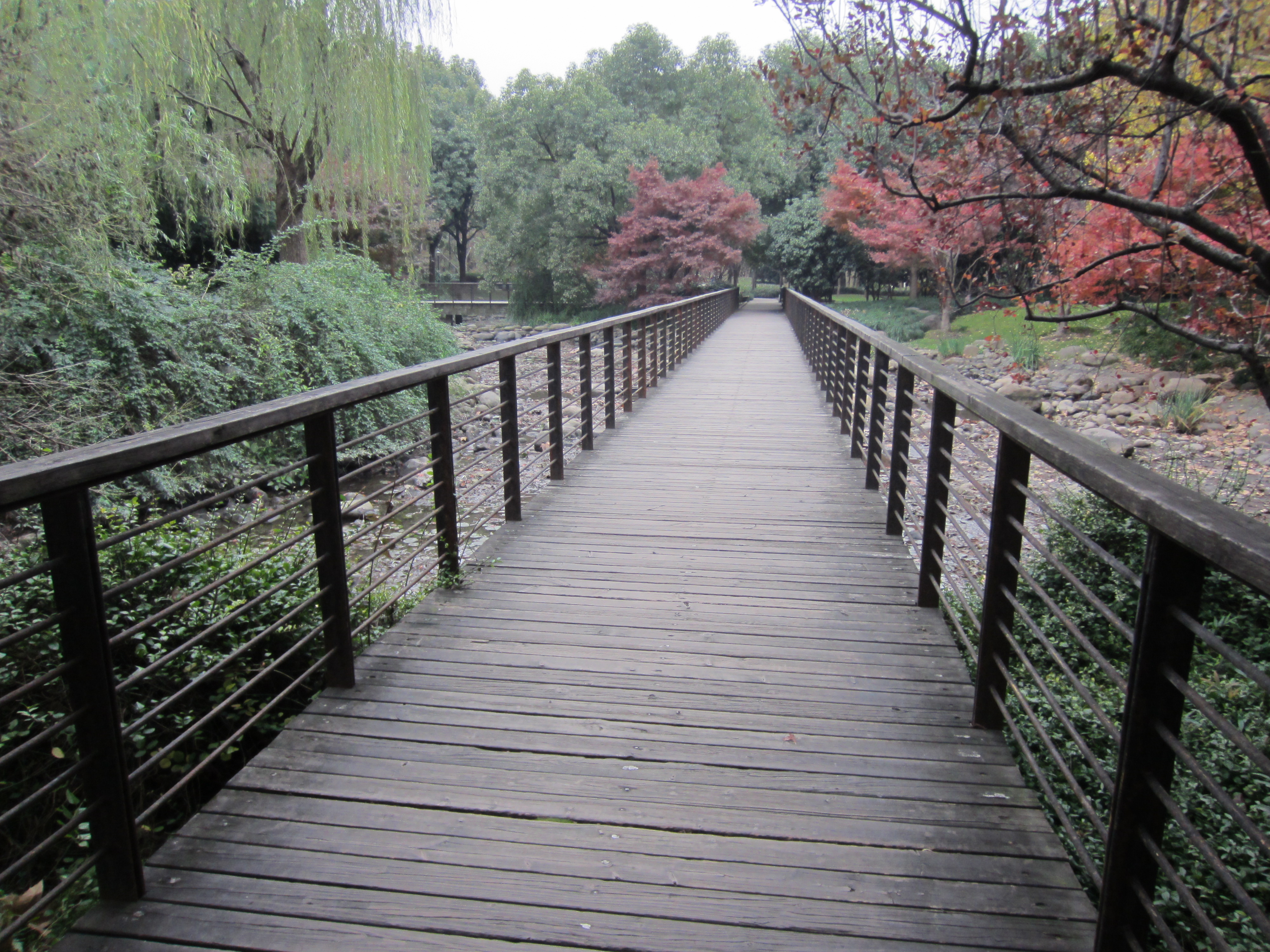
- Taipingqiao Park

- Location within Shanghai
- Location: Huangpu District, Shanghai, China
- Coordinates: 31°13′17″N 121°28′23″E

Taipingqiao Park (Chinese: 太平桥公园; pinyin: Tàipíngqiāo Gōngyuán) is a park in Huangpu District, Shanghai, China. In the center of the park is a man-made lake called Taiping Lake (Chinese: 太平湖; pinyin: Tàipíng Hú).
