= Little Britches (book) =

Book by Ralph Moody

Little Britches: Father and I Were Ranchers
- Author: Ralph Moody
- Illustrator: Edward Shenton
- Cover artist: Jungsun Whang
- Language: English
- Genre: Children's novel, Biographical novel
- Publisher: BisonBooks
- Publication date: August 14, 1950
- Publication place: United States
- Media type: Print (hardback & paperback)
- Pages: 260
- ISBN: 0-8032-8178-1

Little Britches: Father and I Were Ranchers is an autobiographical account of Ralph Moody's early life in the vicinity of Littleton, Colorado, from 1906 to 1910. Moody was eight when his father moved to Colorado, and eleven when his father died. This is the first book in Moody's series of autobiographies. It has been in print continuously since 1950.

One topic Moody discusses is the importance of water rights and the profound challenges these can pose to a community.

The book was the basis for the 1970 Disney film The Wild Country.

== Plot summary ==
Ralph and his family move from East Rochester, New Hampshire, to Littleton, Colorado, because their father is getting sick from working in the mines. There, Ralph learns to be a cowboy and competes in the roundup trick riding contest. Ralph's family lives at the end of the water ditch, so they don't get any water when there is a drought.

In 1910 Ralph's father dies and Ralph became the man of the family.

== Editions ==
- New York: W.W. Norton & Company, 1950.
- New York: W.W. Norton & Company, 1962.
- Cutchogue, NY: Buccaneer Books (reprint edition), 1986. ISBN 0-89966-563-2
- Lincoln: University of Nebraska Press, 1991. ISBN 0-8032-8178-1
- Spokane, WA: Books In Motion, 2000. Audiobook ISBN 1-58116-184-0
- Cynthiana, KY: Purple House Press (hardcover reprint), Oct 2017. ISBN 978-1-930900-96-7 and (hardcover reprint), Dec 2022. ISBN 9781948959902
