= Death and state funeral of Fahd of Saudi Arabia =

Death and Funeral of King Fahd

Death and State Funeral of Fahd of Saudi Arabia
- Date: 1 August 2005 (date of death); 2 August 2005 (date of funeral)
- Venue: King Faisal Specialist Hospital (death); Imam Turki bin Abdullah Mosque (funeral)
- Location: Riyadh, Saudi Arabia
- Participants: Funeral attendees

Fahd bin Abdulaziz Al Saud, King of Saudi Arabia, died on the morning of 1 August 2005, at the age of 84, (Note: His exact date of birth is unknown.) in the King Faisal Specialist Hospital in Riyadh. His funeral was held the next day.

In response to Fahd's death, an emergency Arab League summit, which was originally planned to take place in Sharm El Sheikh (Egypt), was delayed with no rescheduled date confirmed. Many world leaders offered condolences, and several countries declared a period of national mourning.

== Illness and death ==
In June 1982, Fahd ascended to the throne following the passing of his half-brother, Khaled. After experiencing a stroke in 1995, the king's health declined, leading to Crown Prince Abdullah assuming his half-brother's functions as regent.

On 27 May 2005, Fahd was admitted to the King Faisal Specialist Hospital due to pneumonia and a high fever. He died there on 1 August at around 09:30 KSA time. The official announcement of his death was made by the Minister of Information, Iyad bin Amin Madani, and Saudi television interrupted regular programming with recitations of the Quran.

Fahd's half-brother Abdullah, as crown prince, ascended the throne as king, and appointed Prince Sultan, Minister of Defense, as the new crown prince. A formal bay'ah ceremony was held in which clerics, tribal leaders and government officials pledged allegiance to the new king.

== Funeral ==
In accordance with Islamic tradition, Fahd's funeral took place at the Imam Turki bin Abdullah Mosque the day after his death. It was closed to non-Muslim dignitaries, who attended a separate meeting with the new king after the burial.

=== Attendees ===
==== Royalty ====
- The King of Bahrain
- The Sultan of Brunei
- The Crown Prince of Japan (representing the Emperor of Japan)
- The King of Jordan
- Sabah Al-Ahmad Al-Jaber Al-Sabah, Prime Minister of Kuwait (representing the Emir of Kuwait)
- Prince Moulay Rachid of Morocco (representing the King of Morocco)
- The Crown Prince of Norway (representing the King of Norway)
- The Sultan of Oman
- The Emir of Qatar
- The King of Spain
- The King of Sweden
- The Prince of Wales (representing the Queen of the United Kingdom)

==== Other ====
- (Arab League) Secretary-General Amr Moussa
- (Islamic Republic of Afghanistan) President Hamid Karzai of Afghanistan
- President Abdelaziz Bouteflika of Algeria
- Governor-General Michael Jeffery of Australia
- President Ilham Aliyev of Azerbaijan
- President Iajuddin Ahmed of Bangladesh
- Chairman of the Council of Ministers of Bosnia and Herzegovina Adnan Terzić
- Vice Premier Hui Liangyu (representing President Hu Jintao) of China
- President Václav Klaus of Czech Republic
- President Ismail Omar Guelleh of Djibouti
- President Hosni Mubarak of Egypt
- President Jacques Chirac of France
- Vice President Jusuf Kalla of Indonesia
- First Vice President Mohammad Reza Aref of Iran
- President Jalal Talabani of Iraq
  - Prime Minister Ibrahim al-Jaafari of Iraq
- Former Prime Minister Ryutaro Hashimoto of Japan
- President Émile Lahoud of Lebanon
- President Maaouya Ould Sid'Ahmed Taya of Mauritania (Note: Deposed in a coup d'état while attending the funeral.)
- Vice President Atiku Abubakar of Nigeria
- President Pervez Musharraf of Pakistan
- President Mahmoud Abbas of Palestine
- Vice President Noli de Castro of Philippines
- President Abdoulaye Wade of Senegal
- Prime Minister Lee Hae-chan of South Korea
- Prime Minister Mahinda Rajapaksa of Sri Lanka
- President Samuel Schmid of Switzerland
- (Ba'athist Syria) President Bashar al-Assad of Syria
- Foreign Minister Kantathi Suphamongkhon of Thailand
- President Zine El Abidine Ben Ali of Tunisia
- Foreign Minister Abdullah Gül of Turkey
- President Ali Abdullah Saleh of Yemen
- Vice President Dick Cheney of the United States
  - (United States) Former President George H. W. Bush
  - (United States) Former Secretary of State Colin Powell
  - (United States) Chairman of the Joint Chiefs of Staff Peter Pace
