= Johana Bahamón =

Colombian actress (born 1982)

- Bahamón in 2026
- Born: Johana Bahamón Gómez; 27 July 1982 (age 44); Cali, Colombia
- Education: Colegio de Estudios Superiores de Administración
- Occupations: Actress, activist
- Spouse: Juan Manuel Salazar (m. 2014)

Johana Bahamón Gómez (born 27 July 1982) is a Colombian actress and activist. She is president of the Internal Action Foundation, which she created in 2012 to improve and dignify the quality of life of prison inmates in Colombia. As of 2024, it has benefited more than 150,000 people across 132 facilities.

Since 2014, she has overseen the annual National Prison Theater Festival. She was also a promoter of the Second Chances Law, passed in 2022, which established economic incentives to strengthen access and opportunities in employment and training for people leaving prison.

Forbes magazine named her one of the 50 "Powerful Women of Colombia" in 2020. In 2024, she was included in the BBC's 100 Women list.

== Biography ==
Johana Bahamón was born in Cali on 27 July 1982, the daughter of María Mercedes Gómez and Héctor Bahamón.

She holds a professional degree in business administration from the Colegio de Estudios Superiores de Administración (CESA). In 2000, she began her career as an actress, and later complemented her training with acting courses and workshops in Bogotá and at the New York Film Academy. In 2004, she made her television debut in the RCN telenovela La viuda de la mafia.

After appearing in 15 productions – her last leading role was in the series Tres Milagros – she retired from acting to devote herself to working in prisons. In 2012, she created a theater group in El Buen Pastor women's prison in Bogotá, with which she began her involvement in the prison sector. Since then, she has been a promoter of second chances for the prison and post-prison population of Colombia.

In 2008, she had a child with singer Andrés Cabas. They broke up the following year.

She married stockbroker Juan Manuel Salazar in 2014.

== Internal Action Foundation ==
The Internal Action Foundation (Spanish: Fundación Acción Interna) is a nonprofit organization created in 2012 by Johana Bahamón to contribute to the family, social, and labor reintegration of the prison and post-sentenced population of Colombia, and to the reduction of recidivism.

The foundation has initiated several projects for the reintegration and resocialization of the prison population. One of the most prominent was Interno, the world's first restaurant open to the public inside a women's prison. It was selected by Time as one of the 100 best places in the world to visit in 2018. It was closed due to the transfer of the women's prison in Cartagena, Colombia. Another is the Internal Agency, the first advertising firm to operate inside a prison. In 2022, Bahamón promoted the Second Chances Law – passed as Law 2208 of 17 May 2022 – which aims to create greater opportunities for access to the labor market for the post-sentenced population, people under house arrest, and those on parole. In turn, it grants tax, economic, corporate, and other benefits that positively impact the cost structure of companies in relation to the hiring of these workers.

Bahamón established the annual National Prison Theater Festival in 2014.

According to its global compact, with its social productive projects and its methodology, the Internal Action Foundation has had an impact on "the public policy that impacts all persons deprived of liberty, post-sentenced persons, and their resocialization, restorative, and reintegration process." As of 2024, it has benefited more than 150,000 people across 132 facilities.

== Publications ==
In 2021, Bahamón released her first book, Historias Privadas de la Libertad (Private Stories of Freedom), with the publishing house Planeta, which discusses the change in her life's focus, as well as the stories of eight inmates and post-sentenced prisoners.

In 2022, she published Segundas Oportunidades (Second Chances), also with Planeta. It follows five women through the difficulties they encounter after leaving prison.

== Awards and recognition ==
- 2014: Named one of the 30 best leaders in Colombia by Semana
- 2015: Named one of women who contribute to Colombia by Semana
- 2017: Ernst & Young Social Entrepreneur of the Year
- 2017: Portafolio Community Contribution Award
- 2019: Selected as one of 11 emerging leaders by the Obama Foundation
- 2020: Cafam Women's Award
- 2020: Included in the Forbes 50 Powerful Women list
- 2020: Policarpa Salavarrieta Women and Democracy Order from the Senate of Colombia
- 2020: Included in Toyp International's Ten Outstanding Young Persons of the World
- 2020: World Economic Forum Young Global Leader
- 2024: Included in the BBC's 100 Women list
