= Evelyn Nakabira Lagu =

Ugandan singer and actress (born 1982)

- Born: 1 June 1982; Kalungu District
- Died: 18 September 2023 (aged 41)
- Known for: Singer, Backup Artist, Actress
- Children: Freddie Kasavu

Evelyn Nakabira Lagu, widely known by her stage name Evelyn Love or Evelyn Lagu, was a prominent Ugandan singer, backup artist, and actress. She gained fame for her powerful voice, versatility in music and acting, and her inspiring resilience despite facing serious health challenges. Evelyn Lagu died on 18 September 2023 (age:41) after battling kidney complications.

== Personal life ==
Evelyn was known for her strong, optimistic character and her gratitude despite facing many health struggles. She was also a mother to children and, with the support of her friends, was able to build a new home for her family in Bujjuuko, Wakiso, earlier in 2023.

== Early life and education ==
Evelyn Nakabira Lagu was born on June 1, 1982, in Kalungu District, Uganda. After losing both of her parents at an early age, she was raised by her aunt and husband George W Lubega was working UEB / He looked after Eva, paying her fees in Mityana District. Lagu attended several schools, including Aga Khan Primary School, Mityana Secondary School, and Pride Secondary School in Mityana for her O' Level education. She completed her A' Level education at St. Peter's Busubizi in 1999.

== Career ==
Evelyn Lagu's career in the entertainment industry began as a backup singer for some of Uganda’s most prominent artists. Her early role as a backup singer helped establish her reputation in the local music scene and led to her solo career as a singer. Known for her strong vocal abilities, Evelyn quickly gained recognition in Uganda’s music industry, particularly within the Afrobeat, Pop, and Dancehall genres. In addition to her musical achievements, Evelyn ventured into acting, appearing in several local films and TV dramas. Her versatility in both music and acting made her a beloved figure in Uganda’s entertainment world.

== Health struggles and fundraising efforts ==
In the years leading up to her death, Evelyn faced serious health complications, including heart and kidney issues, which required frequent hospitalizations. Despite undergoing treatment, her health remained a constant challenge. Evelyn continued to perform and remain active in her music career while also using her platform to raise funds for her medical care. Several fundraising campaigns were organized to support her, with one notable campaign raising over 60 million Ugandan Shillings.

Despite the financial challenges in covering her medical costs, Evelyn remained determined to raise funds for her treatment through her musical engagements and public appearances. She was also planning an "Evelyn Love Charity Concert" in October 2023, which was meant to raise additional funds and awareness for her health condition, but she died before the event could take place.

== Death and legacy ==
Evelyn Nakabira Lagu died on 18 September 2023 after a long battle with heart and kidney complications. Her death came shortly after returning home from the hospital. Tributes from fellow musicians, artists, and political figures poured in on social media, honoring her strength and positive spirit during her life. Fellow artist Eddy Kenzo and journalist Gabriel Buule were among those who shared heartfelt messages in her memory.

Evelyn Love is remembered for her determination to continue performing despite her health challenges.
