= Emory Collins =

American racing driver

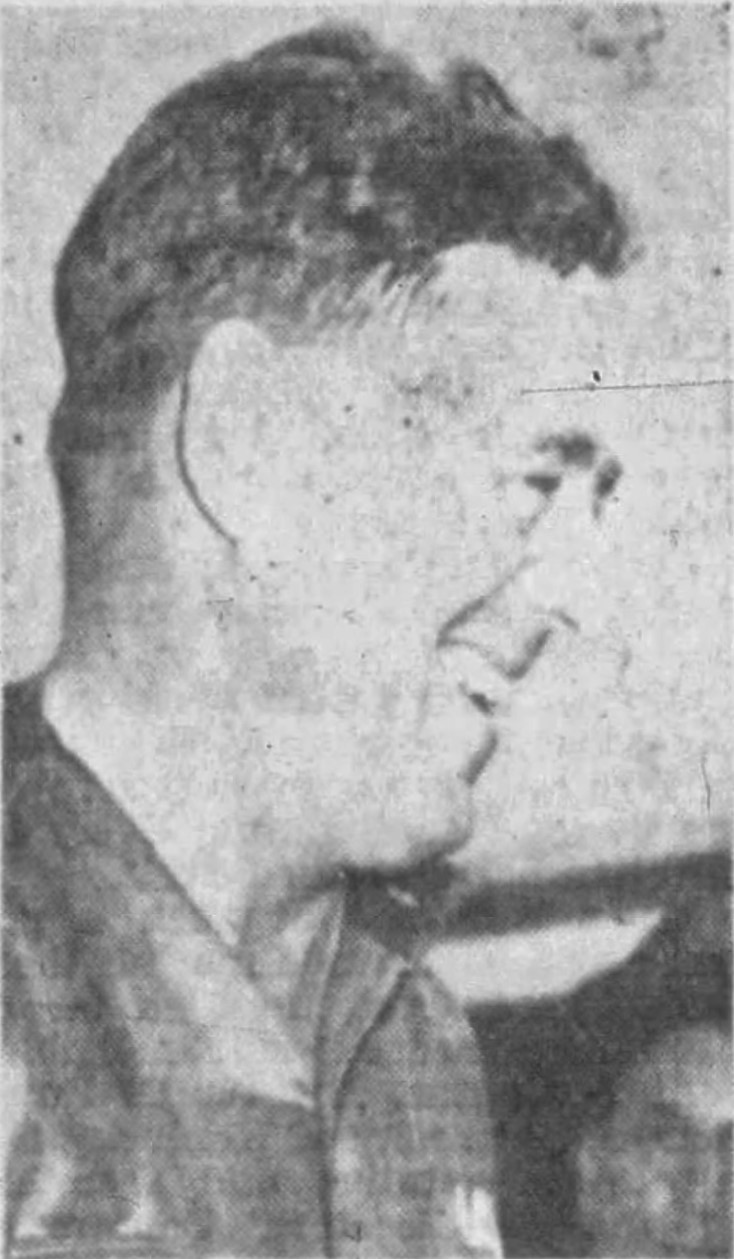
Collins in 1946

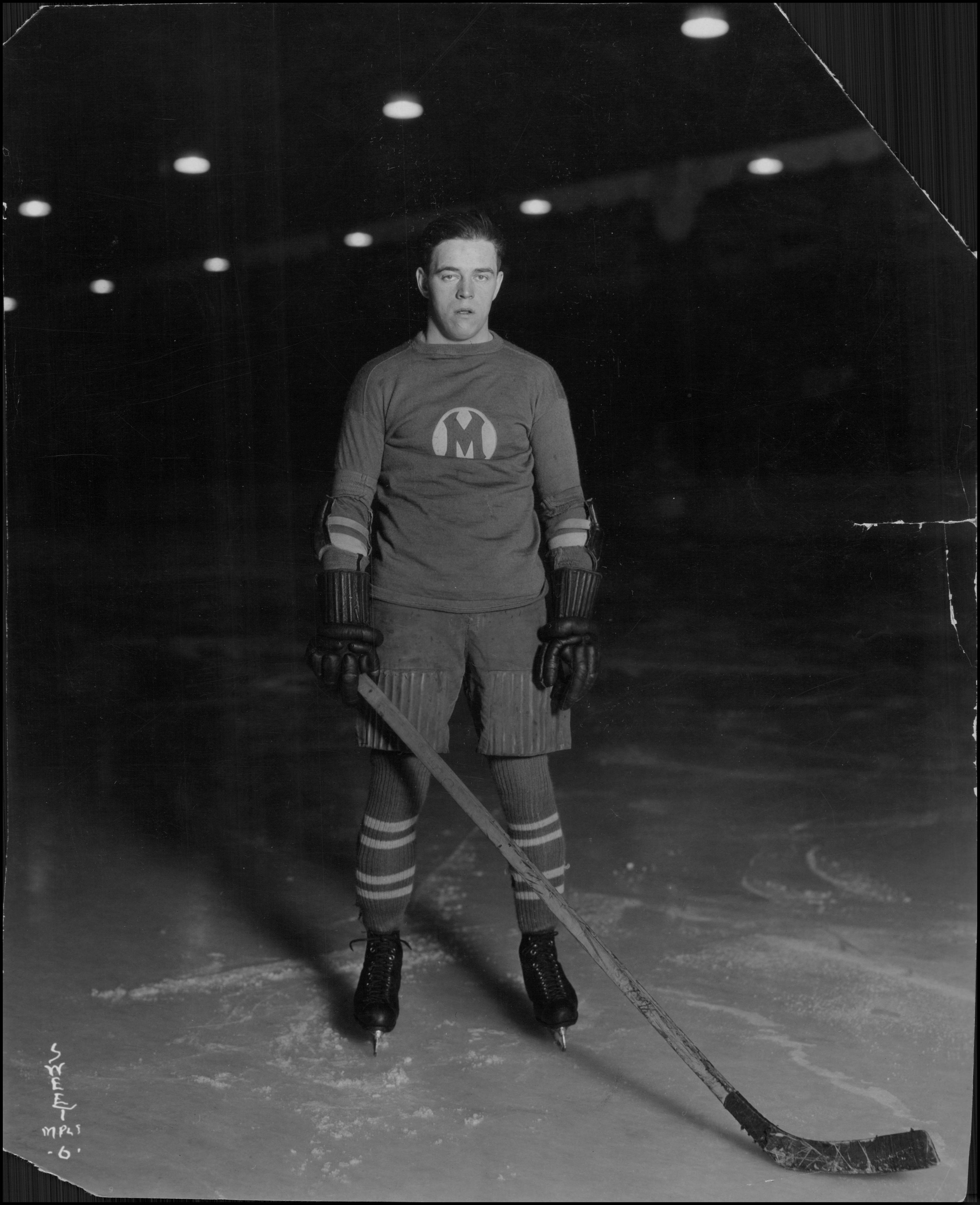
Collins as a member of the Minneapolis Millers

Emory Collins (November 18, 1904 – June 2, 1982) was an American racing driver from Le Mars, Iowa. He won the International Motor Contest Association (IMCA) sprint car national championship in 1938, 1946, 1947, and 1948. Collins was inducted in the National Sprint Car Hall of Fame in 1991. He was known for racing the red number 7 Offenhauser sprint car between 1921 and 1951.

== Backgrounds ==
Collins was born in Sibley, Iowa on November 18, 1904, before moving to Regina, Saskatchewan, Canada in 1907. Collins started working as a mechanic when he was 9 years old. Collins played ice hockey. He played on the Regina Pats and on the Canadian National Team in the Olympics.

== Racing career ==
Collins started racing when he was 17 years old in 1921. Collins' first win came in a Model T at Semans, Saskatchewan. He took a Chevrolet "big" car to victory lane at Winnipeg on the following year. J. Alex Sloan, promoter of IMCA, took Collins to the United States to play on a Chicago professional hockey team and determined that Collins should drive race cars instead.

Collins and Gus Schrader frequently raced against each other in the 1930s and were the class of the field. Schrader won the 1933 to 1937 IMCA national championships. Collins won the 1938 IMCA national sprint car championship at the final race. Schrader won the 1939 and 1940 championships and won the 1941 championship before his death. All racing activities halted in the United States from 1942 until 1945 because of World War II.

Collins returned to racing after the war and won the 1946, 1947, and 1948 IMCA Sprint car championships. He had several wins in 1950 including Sioux Falls, South Dakota, Oskaloosa, Iowa, and Lethbridge, Alberta. Collins stopped racing in 1951 and he retired from racing at Le Mars.

== Career awards ==
Collins was inducted in the National Sprint Car Hall of Fame (United States) in 1991. Collins was inducted in the Kossuth County Racing Hall of Fame in 2011. Collins was a member of the inaugural 2018 class at the Iowa Hall of Fame and Racing Museum.

== Personal life ==
Collins died at the age of 77 on June 2, 1982, from a heart attack. Collins was survived by his wife Irene. Collins was nicknamed "Spunk".
