= Murder of Christelle Bancourt =

1982 child murder in Marseille, France

Christian Marletta affair
- Location: Marseille, France
- Date: June 1982 – March 1985
- Attack type: Kidnapping, rape, aggravated murder

Christian Marletta was accused of rape, murder and dismemberment of Christelle Bancourt, a twelve-year-old girl, in Marseille. Marletta was convicted and sentenced to life imprisonment in 1985. He was released in 2006.

== Disappearance ==
Christelle Bancourt went missing at around 6:20 pm on June 10, 1982, near the Le Bois Fleuri social services agency where she was going to the dentist. No one saw or heard anything.

== Bancourt murdered after being kidnapped ==
Marletta had said that he went to the Bois Fleuri foyer, where he saw Christelle. Then, he said, he came back some time later and saw the girl again. Christian Marletta, who knew her, offered to bring her home and a few minutes later they had a slight accident, during which Christelle fell and passed out.

Marletta said that he brought Christelle home to take care of her. He put her on the bed and that Christelle looked at him strangely because she knew she shouldn't be there. Then, according to his confession, Marletta was seized with a feeling of panic and strangled Christelle until she was no longer breathing. He then allegedly took her to the bathroom to undress her, then decided to skin her body with knives and a chopper. When the police told him that Christelle had been raped, Marletta denied raping her.

== Investigation ==
A week after Christelle's disappearance, a human trunk was discovered in a garbage bag in the parking lot of the Carrefour le Merlan hypermarket, about ten kilometers from the Le Bois Fleuri building. The autopsy showed that the trunk belonged to a young girl. Moreover, the young girl had been raped and sodomized, and the butchering showed that it was a professional who carried out this work.

The police then sought out suspect Christian Marletta. After being questioned, he denied being responsible for Christelle's disappearance. The police then took Marletta to the morgue to confront him with Christelle's body. Back at the Police Station, the police presented him with the garbage bags in which Christelle's body was discovered. Marletta confessed that the trash bags belonged to him, and confessed to having murdered Christelle.

== Discovery of body and aftermath ==
In July 1982, an arm, a leg, and a head were found near Pointe Rouge, and after examination, the head turned out to be that of Christelle Bancourt. The autopsy performed on June 17, 1982 on the other pieces of Christelle's body revealed that she was killed no later than 36 hours before the discovery of the body (on June 15, 1982) and no earlier than 4 days before (on June 13, 1982). For the defence lawyers, if Christelle was killed between June 13 and June 15, 1982, that exonerates Marletta, since the latter was in Lot 3.

During the investigation, the police learned that Christian Marletta was accused in 1980 of having molested Christelle's twin sister, Chantal. At the time, the director of the home did not believe Chantal, and there was no investigation. However, according to Chantal, Christelle was undoubtedly murdered because Christian Marletta wanted revenge for this accusation.

Christian Marletta was imprisoned in the Baumettes prison, after having repeated his confessions twice before the Public Prosecutor and the Examining Magistrate. In prison, Christian Marletta received a visit from several psychiatric experts, to whom he told several versions of events. He first said that he did not kill Christelle, and that he discovered her body in front of her door. Panicked, he cut up the body before throwing the remains in Pointe Rouge and in the supermarket parking lot. In another version given to the examining magistrate on July 5, he said he received a phone call ordering him to throw away the body parts, otherwise his wife and son would have serious problems. Lawyers emphasize the absence of reconstitution and the rejection of several requests for documents.

== The trial ==
On March 12, 1985, the trial of Christian Marletta began. Despite the testimony of his friends and his family, who painted a glowing portrait of him, Marletta did not convince anyone when he declared that he had not killed Christelle. Defense lawyers argued that Marletta's apartment was clean when the police searched it: if Christian Marletta had killed Christelle, splashes of blood would have been found on the wall or on the floor. Apart from a flap of skin found in the shower, there is no physical evidence to implicate Marletta.

Marletta declared that he no longer knew what he was doing and that he broke down in the face of pressure from the police, especially when he was taken to the morgue to face Christelle's corpse. However, for the police, Marletta is guilty, because only the murderer knew the exact location of the garbage bags, and Marletta described the place where the human remains were found.

== Prison time and aftermath ==
Marletta was finally sentenced to life imprisonment on March 15, 1985 by the Aix-en-Provence Assize Court, and was imprisoned in Arles prison.

Marletta asked for a review of his trial with the help of Gilbert Collard. An association was formed in its favour, including the Human Rights Committee of Châteauroux, which provided its support. His cassation appeal was dismissed on October 30, 1985. In October 1991, Marletta's defence lawyer, Gilbert Collard held a press conference in Châteauroux calling for a review of the conviction.

Christian Marletta was released from prison in 2006, and is now leading a new life with his partner whom he met in prison.

== TV documentary ==
Christian Marletta had written to Christophe Hondelatte, presenter of the true crime program "Bring in the defendant," to ask him to stop broadcasting the documentary "The confession of Marletta," (January 2008 and September 2009) considering it defamatory and harmful to his reintegration after his release from prison. The producer refused, arguing that the documentary presented not only the evidence incriminating Marletta, but also the evidence in favor of his innocence, including the unusual methods used by the Marseille police at the time.

== See also ==
- List of kidnappings
- List of solved missing person cases (post-2000)
