= Ralph Moody (writer) =

American author (1898–1982)

- Born: December 16, 1898; East Rochester, New Hampshire
- Died: June 20, 1982 (aged 83)
- Occupations: Writer, cowboy
- Writing career
- Period: 1950–1968

Ralph Owen Moody (December 16, 1898 – June 20, 1982) was an American writer who wrote 17 novels and autobiographies largely about the American West, though a few are set in New England. He was born in East Rochester, New Hampshire, and moved to Littleton, Colorado, in 1906 with his family when he was eight, in the hopes that a dry climate would improve his father Charles's tuberculosis. Moody detailed his experiences in Colorado in the first book of the Little Britches series, Little Britches: Father and I Were Ranchers.

== Biography ==
After his father died, eleven-year-old Moody assumed the duties of the "man of the house". He and his sister Grace combined ingenuity with very hard work in a variety of odd jobs, including starting a street baking business, to help their mother provide for their family. The Moody clan returned to Boston some time after Charles's death because Ralph's mother, was served a subpoena but did not want to appear in court against a man she believed to be innocent. Ralph, however, had difficulty readjusting. Following more than two times that he got his name in the local "bad boy book," most of which were false charges, he left the family home in Boston to live on his grandfather's farm in Lisbon Falls, Maine, which is covered in the 1953 book, The Fields of Home. Ralph Moody's later books cover his subsequent travels through Arizona, New Mexico, Nebraska, and Kansas. He traveled west, intending to end up in Littleton, Colorado, before he succumbed to a diagnosed illness, diabetes. His books cover his experience during this time in the desert of the Southwestern United States and the Midwestern United States, including stints as a bust sculptor, a horse rider doing "horse falls" for motion pictures, and a farm hand - turned owner, as he worked his way back toward Colorado, while continuing to support his family financially.

After four years of the roving life, he remained in good health and decided the prognosis for his illness was wrong. According to the Littleton, Colorado Chamber of Commerce, he married Edna Hudgins of Boston in 1922. They moved to Kansas City, Missouri and had three children: Charles, Edna, and Andrew; and Ralph began a career with the Procter & Gamble Company. Soon afterward, he left Procter & Gamble to become partners with a former client, B/G Foods, Inc. He moved his family to California.' Moody's formal education was limited, but he had a lifelong interest in learning and self-education. At age 50, he enrolled in a writing class; this led to his first novel, Little Britches, which led to a series covering his diverse boyhood and overcoming the rigors of growing up in the American West. His books have been described as crude in the language of the times but are highly praised by his readership and have been in continuous publication since 1950. The "crude language" is solely used as an accurate portrayal of the common language of the times, being spoken by the real-life characters depicted in the books.

In the early 1970s, after his wife died Moody moved back to Massachusetts. His mother, Mary Emma, was still living then. She died in 1974 at the age of 102. Ralph then lived with his younger sister, Elizabeth, in Shirley, Massachusetts, until his death on June 20, 1982. According to his Boston Globe obituary, published June 21, 1982, his death was on June 20, 1982.

== Historical books ==
- Kit Carson and the Wild Frontier (1955)
- Geronimo, Wolf of the Warpath (1958)
- Riders of the Pony Express (1958)
- Wells Fargo (1961)
- Silver and Lead: The Birth and Death of a Mining Town (1961)
- American Horses (1962)
- Come on Seabiscuit (1963)
- The Old Trails West (1963)
- Stagecoach West (1967)

== Autobiographies ==
In historical order:

- Little Britches (also known as Father and I Were Ranchers) (1950)
- Man of the Family (1951)
- The Home Ranch (1956) (actually takes place within the same period of time covered in Man of the Family)
- Mary Emma & Company (1961)
- The Fields of Home (1953)
- Shaking the Nickel Bush (1962)
- The Dry Divide (1963)
- Horse of a Different Color (1968)

== Play ==
- The Valley of the Moon (1966)
