= August 1982 =

Month of 1982

<<	August 1982					>>
Su	Mo	Tu	We	Th	Fr	Sa
1	2	3	4	5	6	7
8	9	10	11	12	13	14
15	16	17	18	19	20	21
22	23	24	25	26	27	28
29	30	31

The following events occurred in August 1982:

== August 1, 1982 (Sunday) ==
- An attempt to overthrow Kenya's President Daniel Arap Moi failed, though not before Kenya Air Force private Hezekiah Ochuka led rebels in seizing several air bases and the headquarters of the government radio station. Private Ochuka, who had aspirations of becoming "the next president of Kenya", accepted a proposal by Joseph Ogidi Obuon and Pancras Oteyo Okumu to recruit soldiers for the coup to replace the Moi government with a People Redemption's Council. At 3:00 a.m., Eastleigh Air Base near Nairobi was seized, and by 6:00, Ochuka and Oteyo had seized the Voice of Kenya radio station. The fighting in the failed coup killed more than 100 soldiers and almost 200 civilians. Private Ochuka, Walter Odira Ojode, Corporal Brawell Injeni Njereman, Corporal Walter Odira Ojode and Pancras Okumuwere would all be convicted of treason and executed by hanging.
- Born: Caroline Shaw, American classical music composer, and winner of the 2013 Pulitzer Prize and two Grammy Awards; in Greenville, North Carolina

== August 2, 1982 (Monday) ==
- The Helsinki Metro, the first rapid transit system in Finland, opened to the general public.
- FBI special agent Joseph D. Pistone, who had infiltrated the Bonanno crime family for almost five years from 1976 to 1981 while posing as "Donnie Brasco", began his public testimony in the U.S. District Court for New York. The evidence he had collected had led to more than 100 convictions of members of the New York Mafia, and the expulsion of the Bonannos from the "Mafia Commission" by the other four families (the Genovese, Gambino, Luchesse and Colombo crime families).

== August 3, 1982 (Tuesday) ==
- In the Iran–Iraq War, Operation Ramadan, the three-week long campaign by Iran to capture the city of Basra from Iraq ended without the capture of Basra. In the largest land battle since World War II, Iran sustained the deaths of more than 12,000 of its 90,000 troops, and of nearly all of the 300 Iranian tanks used in the offensive.
- The Apaneca Pact was signed at Apaneca in El Salvador between representatives of the Salvadoran government and the Farabundo Martí National Liberation Front (FMLN) guerrilla rebels to establish the "Government of National Unity".
- The Christian advocacy and hunger relief organization Bread for the World was incorporated in the District of Columbia by Arthur Simon.
- The summit of Estonia's Tartu Ülikool 350, at 20,531 feet (6,258 m) the highest un-ascended mountain in the Soviet Union, was reached for the first time, as six mountaineers scaled the mountain as part of celebrations of the 350th anniversary of the University of Tartu.

== August 4, 1982 (Wednesday) ==
- Major League Baseball player Joel Youngblood became the first person to compete for two different teams in two different locations on the same day. He began the day as the starting centerfielder for the New York Mets at Chicago's Wrigley field against the Chicago Cubs, and drove in two runs with a single in the third inning. Youngblood was preparing to bat in the fourth inning when he was informed that he was no longer a player for the Mets in their 7 to 4 win, and that he had been traded to the Montreal Expos, who wanted him to play that night in Philadelphia against the Phillies. He caught a flight from Chicago to Philadelphia and, in the sixth inning, Youngblood reached first base on a single in a 5 to 4 loss.
- The first annual Great American Bike Race (now the Race Across America) began at the Santa Monica Pier in Santa Monica, California with four competitors— organizer John Marino, along with John Howard, Michael Shermer, and Lon Haldeman, a destination of the Empire State Building in New York City, and a goal of crossing the continental United States in less than 10 days. The distance of the first race— 2,968 miles (4,777 km)— would be covered in less than 10 days, ending after 240 hours on August 14, 1982.
- Soviet Ukrainian writer, Russian Orthodox Christian activist and dissident Zoya Krakhmalnikova was arrested at her dacha outside of Moscow on charges of publishing the journal Nadezhda and arranging to have printed copies smuggled back in the USSR after printing. She was imprisoned for one year at Lefortovo Prison in Moscow, and then exiled to Ust-Kan in Siberia, where she would remain for four more years before being pardoned in 1987.
- Ranulph Fiennes and Charles R. Burton, who had crossed the South Pole and North Pole in their journey to travel around the world on a south to north to south course, were able to reach their expedition ship, MV Benjamin Browning, almost four months after leaving the North Pole and being stranded on a drifting ice floe for 99 days.

== August 5, 1982 (Thursday) ==
- Australian aviator and entrepreneur Dick Smith began an attempt at the first solo helicopter flight around the world. Departing from Dallas, Texas and the U.S. in his Bell 206L-1 LongRanger II, the Spirit of Texas, Smith would complete the achievement, landing at Dallas on July 22, 1983, after traveling more than 26,000 miles (42,000 km), with 56 sops for refueling.
- Died:
  - Sir John Charnley, 70, English orthopedic surgeon and pioneer of the hip replacement operation.
  - Bushy Graham (ring name for Angelo Gerraci), 77, Italian-born American boxer who held the world bantamweight championship for seven months in 1928 and 1929

== August 6, 1982 (Friday) ==
- The film Pink Floyd – The Wall, based on the 1979 Pink Floyd studio album The Wall, premiered in the United Kingdom, and opened on August 13 in North American theaters.
- Born: Benjamin Bronfman, American businessman and rap artist, co-founder of the direct air capture Global Thermostat and Grammy Award winner; in New York City as the son of Edgar Bronfman Jr. and Sherry Brewer Bronfman.
- Died: S. K. Pottekkatt, 69 Indian Malayalam language writer of almost 60 books, including 10 novels and 18 nonfiction travel accounts

== August 7, 1982 (Saturday) ==
- Nine people were killed and 72 wounded when a pair of terrorists from the Armenian Secret Army for the Liberation of Armenia (ASALA) detonated a bomb at the crowded check-in area at the airport in Ankara, where passengers were standing in line to check in for a KLM airlines flight, then fired submachine guns into the crowd. The act was carried out as part of a retaliation for the Armenian genocide and the deaths of as many as 1.5 million people carried out by the Ottoman Empire from 1915 to 1917 against members of the Armenian minority. The gunmen then entered the airport cafeteria and took 20 people hostage before police killed Zohrab Sarkissian and arrested Levon Ekmekjian.
- Belisario Betancur took office for a four-year term as the new President of Colombia.
- In an all-star game of soccer football, organized by FIFA as a charity benefit for UNICEF and played in the U.S. before a crowd of 76,891 people at Giants Stadium in East Rutherford, New Jersey, the European All-Stars defeated "Rest of the World All-Stars"
- Jim Rice of the Boston Red Sox, saved a 4-year-old spectator, Jonathan Keane, who had been struck by a batted ball while sitting two rows up from the Red Sox dugout. Rice ran into the stands, grabbed the boy and carried him into the team clubhouse where medical staff began first aid until an ambulance arrived to rush the boy to a hospital for an emergency surgery for a fractured skull. Keane made a full recovery and would credit Rice years later with saving his life.
- Died: Jill Banner, 35, American actress who portrayed Virginia, the eponymous "spider baby" in the comedy horror film Spider Baby (1967), was killed when her car was hit by a truck on the Ventura Freeway near North Hollywood, California.

== August 8, 1982 (Sunday) ==
- The first elections for the new, 61-seat Corsican Assembly as the island of Corsica attained autonomy within France. A coalition of the Union for French Democracy, Rally for the Republic and Bonapartist political parties won 19 seats, with the other 42 seats divided among 14 other parties. Prosper Alfonsi was elected as the first president of the Corsican Assembly.
- Born: Fahadh Faasil, Indian film actor; in Alappuzha, Kerala state

== August 9, 1982 (Monday) ==
- Terrorists, later identified as being from the Abu Nidal Organization terrorist group killed six people and injured 22 others in an attack on the Chez Jo Goldenberg restaurant on Rue des Rosiers in Paris. The two assailants, who had targeted the business, known for its Jewish cuisine and began by throwing a grenade into the dining room, then firing submachine guns at random individuals. Although Abu Nidal had been suspected, identification of the actual perpetrators would not happen until 32 years later in 2015.
- A mass shooting killed six people and injured three others in Grand Prairie, Texas when a disgruntled employee of Western Transportation & Storage Company entered the company warehouse with a semi-automatic rifle, and two handguns, killed employees there, and then drove to the Jewel-T warehouse and killed others, before fleeing the scene and dying in a police shootout.
- August 9, 1982, had been the planned day for the landing of American astronauts on Mars, based on a project that had been approved by NASA, but then canceled along with other space missions because of budget cuts. The plan conceived was an opportune launch time of November 12, 1981, arrival on Mars for 10-week mission, a flyby of Venus on February 28, 1983, and a return to Earth on August 14, 1983.
- The CNN2 cable television news channel and companion to Cable News Network was renamed Headline News (HLN) more than seven months after its debut.
- The first International Day of the World's Indigenous Peoples was observed with the convening of the first meeting of the UN's Working Group on Indigenous Populations.
- Born: Tyson Gay, American sprinter and world champion 2006 and 2007 in the 100 meter dash, and 2007 champion in the 200m; in Lexington, Kentucky
- Died: Alexandre Alexeieff, 81. Russian expatriate filmmaker and illustrator, co-inventor of the pinscreen animation technique in the 1930s

== August 10, 1982 (Tuesday) ==
- All six members of a vacationing Canadian family were kidnapped and murdered near the Wells Gray Provincial Park in British Columbia. Bob and Jackie Johnson of Westbank, British Columbia, along with their two children Janet and Karen, and Jackie's parents George and Edith Bentley had gone on a two-week camping trip in the provincial park on August 2, and had been scheduled to return on August 16. On September 13, the bodies of all six were found in a car that had been set on fire. The crime would remain unsolved until the arrest of 24-year-old David William Shearing in the town of Dawson Creek. Shearing would confess that on August 10, he had stalked the family, shot the four adults with a .22 caliber rifle and kidnapped both girls and held them hostage before shooting Karen on August 16 and raping and shooting Janet the next day.
- In the first use of the electric chair in the U.S. state of Virginia since the reinstatement of the death penalty, the execution of convicted murderer Frank J. Coppola was mishandled. As Coppola was being put to death at the Virginia State Penitentiary in Richmond, his head and his leg caught fire.
- In Spain, the newest Statute of Autonomy granted self-government, within the Kingdom of Spain, to residents of Aragon, Castilla-La Mancha, the Canary Islands, and Navarre.
- Born: Shaun Murphy, English snooker player and winner of the 2005 World Championship; in Harlow, Essex

== August 11, 1982 (Wednesday) ==
- Pan Am Flight 830, which originated in Tokyo on a flight to Los Angeles, was flying at an altitude of 36,000 feet (11,000 m) with 270 passengers and 15 crew when a terrorist bomb exploded under one of the passenger seats. While the 16-year-old passenger sitting above the bomb was killed, and 16 other passengers ended, the crew, led by pilot Skipper O'Halloran, was able to make an emergency landing in Honolulu.
- Died:
  - Tom Drake, 64, American film actor known for Meet Me in St. Louis in 1944 and The Green Years (1946), died of lung cancer.
  - Paolo Giaconne, 53, Italian forensic pathologist and university professor, was murdered by the Sicilian Mafia

== August 12, 1982 (Thursday) ==
- The Dow Jones Industrial Average, Wall Street's base for measuring the performance of the New York Stock Exchange, reached a high of 776.92 points, beginning a steady climb that would continue for five years and pass 2,700 points on August 17, 1987, before a major downturn major downturn in 1987, but growing by more than 1,400 percent to a close of 11,722.98 points by January 14, 2000.
- A call for a forum to discuss the political abuse of psychiatry in the Soviet Union was issued in advance of the upcoming 1983 Congress of the member national governing bodies of the World Psychiatric Association (WPA), as the American Psychiatric Association sent a memo to all members. After the United Kingdom, France, Denmark, Norway, Switzerland and Australia issued their own resolutions of support, the All-Union Society of Neuropathologists and Psychiatrists of the USSR would announce on January 31, 1983, its resignation from the WPA under threat of expulsion.
- Mexico's secretary of finance, economist Jesús Silva Herzog Flores, announced that the nation was halting all foreign exchange of the Mexican peso for other currencies. The move came after the government found that it had insufficient funds to renew its bank loans to service foreign debt that was expected to rise the $65 billion at the end of 1982, and that its only recourse was to use $12 billion U.S. dollars from private deposits in Mexican banks. Foreign exchange resumed on August 17, at which time the value of the peso had changed from 26.5 pesos to the U.S. dollar to 120 pesos per American dollar. On August 1, in a speech at the city of Guanajuato, Silva Herzog had declared that austerity measures would be implemented with the withdrawal of consumer subsidies, resulting in prices for gasoline, electricity, gas and basic foods doubling. Mexico's crisis in paying its large foreign debt triggered the Latin American debt crisis that would spread throughout Central and South America.
- Died:
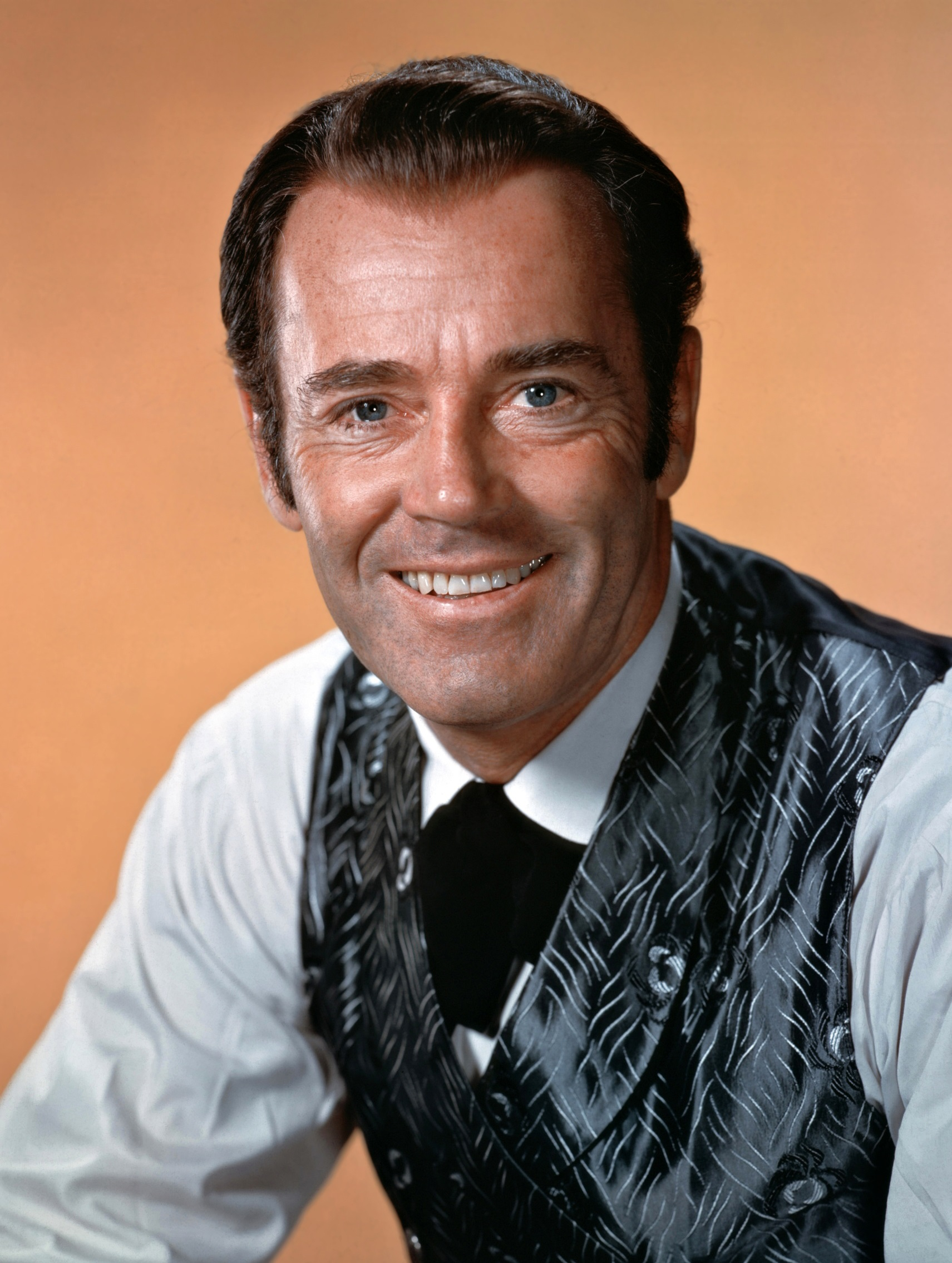
  Henry Fonda
  - Henry Fonda, 77, American film, stage and television actor and producer, 1940 Academy Award winner for On Golden Pond and 1948 Tony Award winner for Mister Roberts, known for being the producer of the film 12 Angry Men
  - Salvador Sánchez, 23, Mexican professional boxer who wasfeatherweight champion from 1980 until 1982 for both the World Boxing Council (WBC) and The Ringwas killed in a single-vehicle car accident, when he crashed his sports car along Mexico's federal highway.
  - Tomás Romero Pereira, 95, President of Paraguay for three months as a figurehead installed by General Alfredo Stroessner after a 1954 coup d'état until Stroessner qualified for the presidency in a single-candidate election

== August 13, 1982 (Friday) ==
- In Hong Kong, health warnings on cigarette packets became mandatory.
- The film Fast Times at Ridgemont High, based on a book of the same name by Cameron Crowe, premiered in theaters across North America after its release by Universal Pictures, and was a critical and financial success, grossing $50 million worldwide after being made on a budget of five million U.S. dollars. The film would be selected in 2005 for preservation in the United States National Film Registry by the Library of Congress as being "culturally, historically, or aesthetically significant".
- Born: Sarah Huckabee Sanders, American politician consultant, White House Press Secretary 2017–2019, and Governor of Arkansas since 2023; in Little Rock, Arkansas
- Died:
  - Joe E. Ross, 68, American actor, comedian, and voice actor for animation, he portrayed the police officer Gunther Toody in the sitcom Car 54, Where Are You?, died from a heart attack while performing at a comedy club.
  - Charles Walters, 70, American film director, choreographer and dancer noted for Easter Parade (1948) and The Unsinkable Molly Brown, died from lung cancer.
  - Air Chief Marshal Pratap Chandra Lal, 65, former Chief of Air Staff of the Indian Air Force during the Indo-Pakistani War of 1971, died from a heart attack while visiting London.
  - Lonnie Coleman, 62, American novelist and magazine editor known for Beulah Land and its two sequels.

== August 14, 1982 (Saturday) ==
- An accident at the Sukhumi-Babusheri Airport in the Soviet Union's Georgia SSR killed all 11 people on a Let L-410 jet that was cleared to taxi to a runway for departure on a flight to Kutaisi. At the same time, an Aeroflot Tu-134 with 82 people aboard was cleared for takeoff from another runway which the smaller jet was crossing, while the Tu-134 was accelerating past 120 miles per hour (190 km/h). The captain of the Tu-134 swerve to avoid the collision and the passengers and crew escaped injury, but the right wing of the Tu-134 "cut through the L-410 at the level of the windows" and killed everyone on the smaller plane.
- In Nicaragua, the crash of a Fuerza Aerea Sandinista airplane on takeoff from Managua killed 20 of the 22 people on board.
- Lon Haldeman won the first Race Across America (at the time, the Great American Bike Race), arriving at the Empire State Building in New York City 9 days, 20 hours and 2 minutes (236 hours) after he had departed from Santa Monica, California and becoming the first person to ride across the continental United States on a bike in less than 10 days. Haldeman traveled 2,966 miles (4,773 km) at an average speed of 12.57 miles per hour (20.23 km/h).
- Died: Patrick Magee, 60, Irish actor, he created the role of the Marquis de Sade in the original stage and screen productions of Marat/Sade, died from a heart attack

== August 15, 1982 (Sunday) ==
- Nilda Ernestina Lucca Oliveras of Puerto Rico became the first woman in Latin America to be ordained as a priest when she was installed a priest in the Episcopal Church of Puerto Rico.
- At a referendum regarding approval of a new constitution for the West African nation of Equatorial Guinea, almost 150,000 voters (93% of those registered) appeared at polling places, and 139,777 voted to approve the new constitution, with only 6,149 against. Under the document, the acting Chairman of the Supreme Military Council and head of state, Teodoro Obiang Nguema Mbasogo, who had overthrown and executed the dictator Francisco Macías Nguema, was approved for a seven-year term, and would enter his 48th year in office in 2026.
- The Kingdom of Rwenzururu, which had existed since June 30, 1962, as a traditional kingdom within the borders of Uganda, was granted autonomy by the Ugandan government, as King Irema-Ngoma I (Charles Mumbere, who had ruled since 1966), the "Omusinga", pledged allegiancce to Uganda. Mubere would be removed from office in 1984 after leaving Uganda to go to college in the United States, but return in 2009 in a ceremonial role.
- Died:
  - Hugo Theorell, 79, Swedish scientist who received the Nobel Prize in Physiology or Medicine in 1955 for discovering oxidoreductase enzymes and their effects
  - Ernie Bushmiller, 76, American cartoonist, creator of the comic strip character Nancy, he had previously taken over the older comic strip Fritzi Ritz
  - Maurice Gallay, 79, French footballer; he played as a defender for Olympique de Marseille and the French national team in the 1920s, he helped the OM team to win back-to-back Coupe de France titles in 1926 and 1927

== August 16, 1982 (Monday) ==
- The Palestinian autonomy talks that had been conducted since 1979 between Egypt and Israel for the creation of self-government for the Palestinian residents of Israel were permanently ended when the Egyptian government declined to renew negotiations until Israel withdrew from Lebanon.
- Salvador Jorge Blanco took office as the new President of the Dominican Republic after having been elected on May 16. Blanco succeeded Jacobo Majluta, who had taken office on July 5 the day after the suicide of President Antonio Guzmán Fernández
- In Spain, the autonomous province of Castilla–La Mancha was created for the first self-government there since the demise of the Crown of Castile.
- Born: Stefan Maierhofer, Austrian soccer football player and manager with 19 caps as a striker for the Austria national team; in Gablitz

== August 17, 1982 (Tuesday) ==
- The first compact disc (CD) was released by Polygram records of Langenhagen, and featured recordings of a concert of waltz music composed by Frederic Chopin and performed by pianist Claudio Arrau.
- Hong Kong serial killer Lam Kor-wan, who had kidnapped, murdered and dismembered four women since February 3, was arrested after taking photographs of one of his victims and then dropping off the film at a Kodak shop in the Mong Kok neighborhood. The shop manager who developed the photos called police, and two plainclothes officers waited for Lam to pick up the purchase. When police arrested Lam and searched his parents' apartment on Kwei Chau Street, their finds included plastic containers of women's sexual organs.
- Died: Ruth First, 57, South African anti-apartheid activist, was killed by a parcel bomb mailed to her office in Mozambique by South African police.

== August 18, 1982 (Wednesday) ==
- At Bangkok in Thailand, the "Royal Lao Democratic Government" was established as a government-in-exile by anti-Communist leaders of the Lao National Liberation Front. The Royal Lao leaders established control over some of the southern provinces of Laos with the military aid from the People's Republic of China

== August 19, 1982 (Thursday) ==
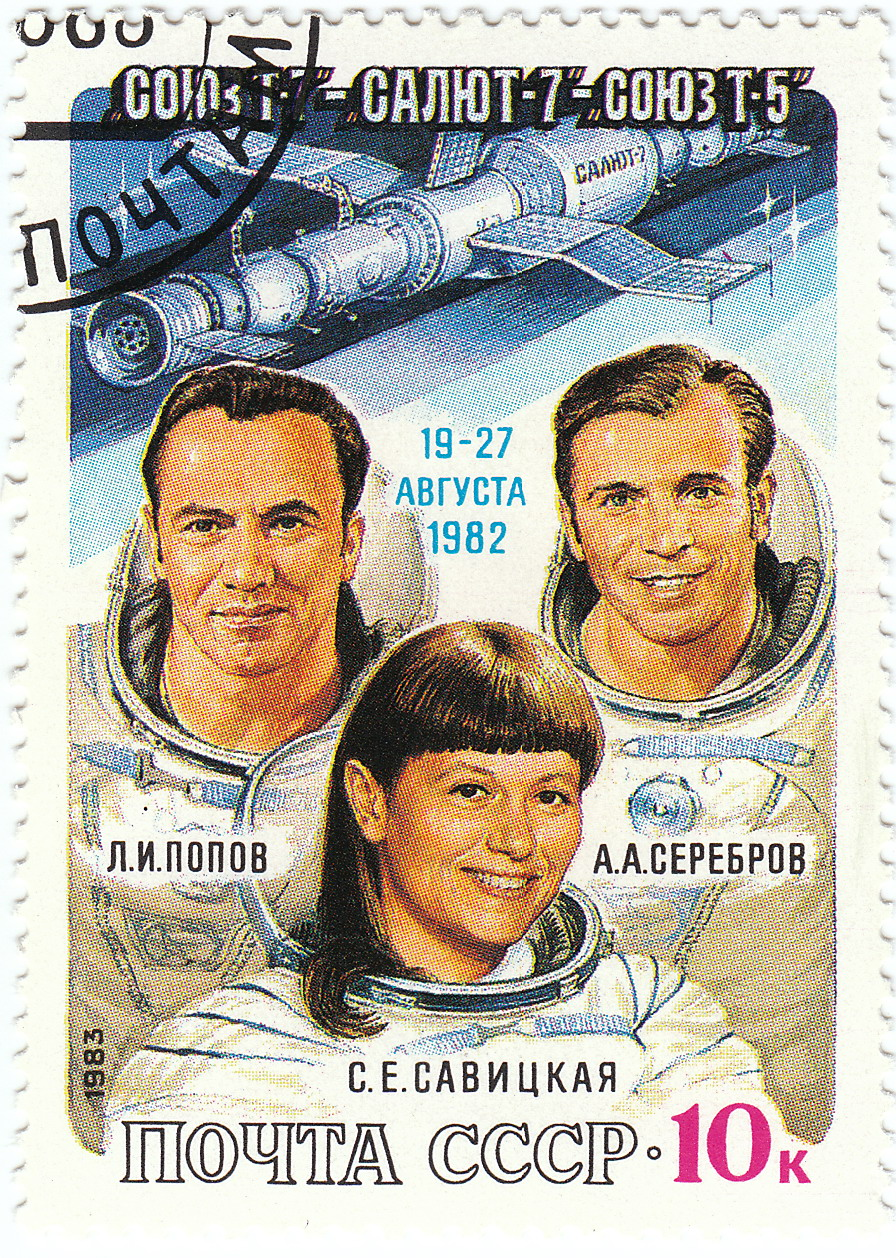
10-kopeck stamp of L.M. Popov, S.E. Savitskaya and A.A. Serebov

- Soviet cosmonaut Svetlana Savitskaya became the second woman to be launched into space, traveling aboard Soyuz T-7, with two other cosmonauts, Leonid Popov and Aleksandr Serebrov, to the Salyut 7 space station. Savitskaya's flight came more than 20 years after the launch of Valentina Tereshkova on Vostok 6 on June 6, 1963. The trio returned to Earth on August 27.
- A supernova in the galaxy NGC 521, SN 1982O, was observed from Earth for the first time by astronomer Miklós Lovas at least 224 million years after it had happened.

== August 20, 1982 (Friday) ==
- The 1st Battalion of Guatemalan Army's Airborne Troops concluded its "Operation Sofia", the eradication of 626 villages and the murder of thousands of Maya civilians in the El Quiché province.
- Carl Robert Brown, a schoolteacher at Miami's Drew Middle School, killed eight people at a repair shop and wounded three others before being killed by an eyewitness. Brown, on medical leave because of mental illness, purchased two shotguns, a semi-automatic rifle and ammunition from Garcia Gun Center, then entered Bpb Moore's Welding and Repair, where he had argued with an employee the day before over the cost of work on a lawnmower engine. Over the next several minutes, Brown moved through and shot 11 employees, eight fatally, before riding away on his bicycle toward Hialeah Junior High School, where he had previously worked. An employee from a nearby store pursued and shot Brown, who still had 20 shotgun shells in his pocket.
- The Hawaii Express, an airline with a single aircraft, began operations with a Boeing 747 that departed from Los Angeles to transport passengers to Honolulu, then refueled and took passengers from Honolulu back to Los Angeles. The airline, founded by Michael Hartley and employing pilots, crew, flight attendants and other personnel who had been laid off when Braniff Airlines went out of business, would operate for 16 months before filing for bankruptcy on December 20, 1983.

== August 21, 1982 (Saturday) ==
- The first troops of the United Nations Multinational Force arrived in Beirut in Lebanon to oversee the withdrawal of 22,000 fighters of the Palestine Liberation Organization (PLO) and of Syrian troops pursuant to a peace agreement mediated by the United States during the ongoing Lebanon War. With peacekeeping troops from France, Italy, the United Kingdom and the United States, the PLO fighters departed Lebanon and were resettled in the Arab nations of Algeria, Iraq, Jordan, Sudan, Syria, Tunisia, North Yemen, South Yemen, with the last PLO soldiers departing on September 2.
- Sobhuza II, King of Swaziland (now Eswatini) as since its attainment of independence in 1968, and as a tribal king since 1899 died at the age of 83 after 82 years and 254 days on the throne. The absolute monarchy was governed for four years by the southern African kingdom's Liqoqo, the Great Council of State, until the installation on August 21, 1986, of Sobhuza's son Mswati III as the new monarch.

== August 22, 1982 (Sunday) ==
- The El Calabozo massacre of more than 200 civilians, and possibly as many as 300, including women and children, was completed by a battalion of the Army of El Salvador.

== August 23, 1982 (Monday) ==
- Bachir Gemayel, commander of the Lebanese Forces, was elected as President of Lebanon after being the only candidate who was willing to govern the war-torn nation. He would be assassinated on September 14 before he was scheduled to take office.
- Pitcher Gaylord Perry of the Seattle Mariners, notorious throwing a spitball (i.e., applying saliva or another foreign substance to the ball to alter its path) and for never getting caught, was finally ejected from a game for that offense. Perry, who played for nine different teams in 22 seasons, was pitching for the Mariners against the Boston Red Sox when umpire Dave Phillips removed him, and he was subsequently suspended for 10 games. Perry would be inducted to the Baseball Hall of Fame in 1991.
- Died:
  - Stanford Moore, 68, American chemist, Nobel Prize laureate.
  - Alberto Cavalcanti, 85, Brazilian film director, producer, and set designer director of propaganda films for the Ealing Studios during the 1940s,

== August 24, 1982 (Tuesday) ==
- The General People's Congress was established as a political party in the Yemen Arab Republic (North Yemen) by President Ali Abdullah Saleh. After the reunification of Yemen in 1990, the GPC would become the ruling political party and would continue to control the Yemeni government from 1993 onward.

== August 25, 1982 (Wednesday) ==
- Operation Mebos, the South African Defence Force (SADF) attack against bases of the People's Liberation Army of Namibia (PLAN) in southern Angola, came to an end after 25 days with the deaths of 345 of the PLAN guerrillas and the destruction of PLAN bases at Ongiva, Xangongo, Cuvelai and Cassinga.
- U.S. Representative Fred Richmond of New York, who had served since 1975 and was one of the wealthiest members of Congress, resigned from office after being found guilty on federal corruption charges of making illegal payments to employees of the Brooklyn Naval Yard and of possession of marijuana, and sentenced to one year and one day in a federal prison, of which he would serve nine months.
- Died:
  - Claude Schaeffer, 84, French archaeologist who led the excavation of Ugarit and the discovery of the Ugaritic religious texts
  - Kazuo Iwama, 63, Japanese engineer and businessman who had been president of the Sony Corporation, died of colon cancer.
  - Hans van Tongeren, 27, Dutch actor who portrayed the suicidal motocrosser "Rien" in his debut film Spetters (1980) committed suicide

== August 26, 1982 (Thursday) ==
- The world's leading manufacturer of asbestos, the Johns Manville Corporation, though financially healthy, filed for Chapter 11 bankruptcy after getting overrun by thousands of lawsuits. Due to the complexity of the case, it emerged on November 28, 1988, majority-owned by a trust established to process injury claims.
- Atilla Altıkat, the military attaché for Turkey's Embassy to Canada, was assassinated in Ottawa while being driven to work on the Ottawa River Parkway. Altikat was stopped for a red light at the intersection with Island Park Drive, when a man approached the passenger window and fired nine shots from a 9mm handgun, then got back into a car and departed. Altikat was killed instantly, and although the Armenian terrorist group ASALA claimed responsibility, the identity of the perpetrator remains unknown.
- The UP Stock Exchange was inaugurated in Kanpur for trading of stock in companies in the Indian state of Uttar Pradesh at a ceremony conducted by India's Finance Minister, Pranab Mukherjee.

== August 27, 1982 (Friday) ==
- Ricky Henderson of the Oakland A's broke the Major League Baseeball record for most stolen bases in a season, held by Lou Brock since 1974 and would close the season with 130 stolen bases.
- Died: Anandamayi Ma, 86, Indian saint, teacher, and mystic, who was revered as an incarnation of Hindu goddess Durga.

== August 28, 1982 (Saturday) ==
- The Broadway musical Sugar Babies had its 1,208th and final performance after a run that began on October 8, 1979.
- U.S. Army private Joseph T. White, stationed near Kaesong in South Korea at the edge of the Korean Demilitarized Zone became the first U.S. soldier since 1965 to defect to North Korea. Using his rifle, White shot the lock of one of the gates leading into the DMZ with documents of the location of land mines on the South Korean side, surrendered to North Korean troops and asked for political asylum. He would live and work for almost three years in North Korea before accidentally drowning in August 1985.
- Born:
  - LeAnn Rimes, American country music singer; in Jackson, Mississippi
  - Kelly Thiebaud, American television soap opera actress and model, 2022 Daytime Emmy Award for Best Supporting Actress; for her role on General Hospital in El Campo, Texas
- Died:
  - George Hele, 91, Australian test cricket umpire
  - Edward "Bearcat" Wright, 50, African-American professional wrestler later inducted into the WWE Hall of Fame, died from complications of sickle cell anemia.

== August 29, 1982 (Sunday) ==
- Element 109, meitnerium, was synthesized in the GSI Helmholtz Centre for Heavy Ion Research in Darmstadt, West Germany, by a research team led by Peter Armbruster and Gottfried Münzenberg, with the bombardment of bismuth-209 by accelerated nuclei of the isotope iron-58 and detected a single atom of meitnerium-278, with a half-life of 4.5 seconds.
- The Transglobe Expedition, the first trip around the world from south to north to both poles, came to an end slightly less than three years after its start on September 2, 1979, as Ranulph Fiennes, Charles R. Burton, and Oliver Shepard returned to their starting point at London. They had reached the South Pole on December 15, 1980, and the North Pole on April 11, 1982, before traveling southward back to London.
- Pope John Paul II became the first pontiff of the Roman Catholic Church to visit "the world's oldest republic", the tiny nation of San Marino.
- Born: Zhang Bo, Chinese film and television actor; in Beijing.
- Died:
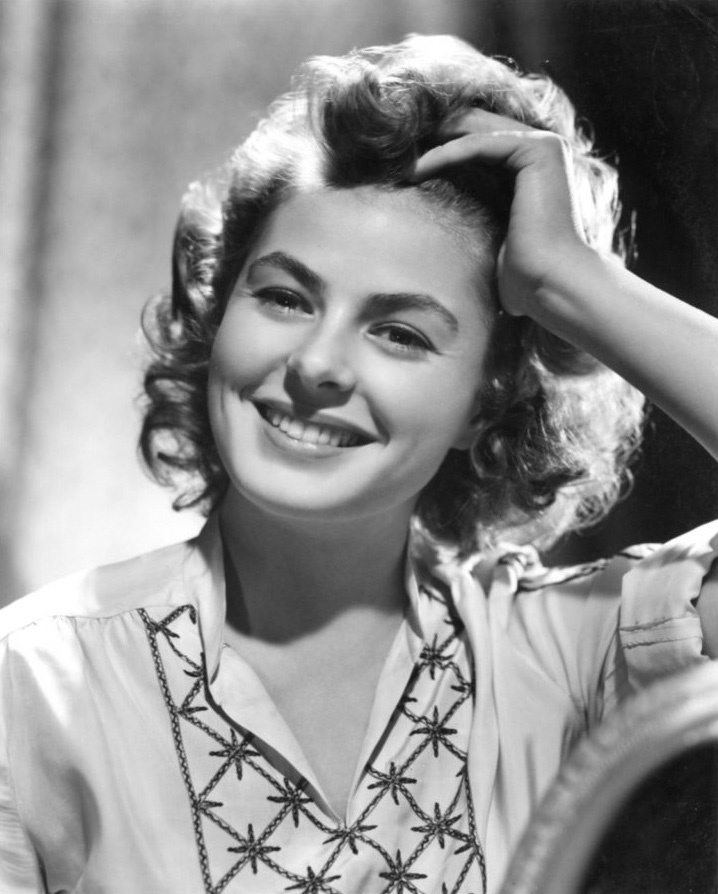
  Ingrid Bergman
  - Ingrid Bergman, 67, Swedish actress and autobiographer, died from breast cancer which had spread to her spine, collapsing her twelfth vertebra and retained only a small part of her left lung had not collapsed.
  - Nahum Goldmann, 87, Belarusian Zionist, founder of the World Jewish Congress who served as the organization's president from 1951 until 1978, president of the World Zionist Organization from 1956 until 1968

== August 30, 1982 (Monday) ==
- The leadership of the Palestinian Liberation Organization (PLO), led by Yasser Arafat, departed from Lebanon as Muslim members of the Multinational Peace Force moved in. Arafat and others flew from Beirut to relocation in Tunisia.
- Furukawa Electric defeated Yanmar Diesel, 3 to 2, to win the JSL Cup, the playoff tournament of the Japan Soccer League.
- The village of Tiki Island, Texas, with a population of more than 1,100 was incorporated on a man-made island that had been primarily constructed in Galveston Bay by land excavated from canals.
- Born: Andy Roddick, American professional tennis player ranked number one in the world by the Association of Tennis Professionals in 2003, when he won the U.S. Open; in Omaha, Nebraska In response to the broadcasting from the U.S. of anti-Castro news and commentary on Radio Marti, Cuba disrupted radio with high-powered wattage transmissions on five AM radio frequencies.

== August 31, 1982 (Tuesday) ==
- Mass protests, organized by the Solidarity trade union, took place in 66 cities in Poland against the state of martial law declared by the nation's Communist government. Street fights and rioting marked many of the protests, three protesters were shot and killed in Lubin, and one demonstrator each was killed in Wroclaw, Gdansk, Nova Huta and Torun, and police arrested 4,050 people.
- The crash of a U.S. Air Force Lockheed C-141 Starlifter cargo plane in Graham County, North Carolina killed all nine people on board while they were flying on a training mission from Charleston Air Force Base in South Carolina.
- Born: Alina Dumitru, Romanian judo champion and 2008 Olympic gold medalist
- Died: Sri Ramappa Balappa Bidari, 83, Indian lawyer and independence activist, and prime minister of the Aundh State principality prior to India's independence from 1941 to 1948; in Bucharest
