= UPSE =

UPSE may refer to:

- UP Stock Exchange
- University of the Philippines School of Economics
- Universidad Estatal Península de Santa Elena
