= September 1982 =

Month of 1982

<<	September 1982					>>
Su	Mo	Tu	We	Th	Fr	Sa
			1	2	3	4
5	6	7	8	9	10	11
12	13	14	15	16	17	18
19	20	21	22	23	24	25
26	27	28	29	30

The following events occurred in September 1982:

== September 1, 1982 (Wednesday) ==
- Near the end of his four-hour State of the Union address to the Mexican Congress at the close of his term, Mexico's outgoing President Jose Lopez Portillo announced that the Mexican government was closing all banks in the nation for five days, nationalizing private banking institutions within the nation, devaluing the nation's currency, the peso, and implementing strict controls. Lopez Portillo received a standing ovation from the members who had been looking for a solution to Mexico's worsening financial crisis.
- U.S. President Ronald Reagan, in a nationally televised address from Los Angeles, introduced the "Reagan peace plan", declaring that Palestinians in the Israeli-occupied West Bank and in Gaza should have "full autonomy" in some form, under supervision by the neighboring Kingdom of Jordan, to be implemented over five years in return for halting terrorist activities against the nation of Israel. Reagan also endorsed negotiations for "an 'undivided' Jerusalem with Palestinian control over East Jerusalem and Israel retaining West Jerusalem. The speech came after the last of the nearly 15,000 Palestinian guerrillas and Syrian troops had departed from West Beirut in Lebanon on a ship to return to Syria, and Palestine Liberation Organization chairman Yasir Arafat arrived in Athens.
- A crisis that would lead to the collapse of the West Germany's government took place at a cabinet meeting in Bonn, as Chancellor Helmut Schmidt argued with his coalition partner, Minister for Economic Affairs Otto Lambsdorff, over Lambsdorff's remarks published the day before in an interview with the daily newspaper Bild. Lambsdorff had told the newspaper that voters in an upcoming election in the state of Hesse should decide whether they wanted his Free Democrats to remain in their coalition with Schmidt's Social Democrats.
- Archaeologist Manolis Andronikos of Salonika University announced that he and a team had discovered the theater where King Philip II of Macedonia, father of Alexander the Great, had been assassinated in 336 BCE. Andronikos had found the burial grounds of King Philip in 1979, and said that the theater ruins were found only 100 milliseconds (0.10 s) from the central palace at Vergina, a village in northeastern Greece that was believed by archaeologist to be on the ruins of Aegae, the ancient Macedonian capital of Aegae. King Philip had been killed by an officer of his guard during a celebration before he was to embark on a new military campaign.
- Born: Jeffrey Buttle, Canadian figure skater and 2008 World Champion; in Smooth Rock Falls, Ontario
- Died: Wladyslaw Gomulka, 77, the de facto leader of Poland from 1956 to 1970 as General Secretary of the nation's Communist organization, the Polish United Workers' Party

== September 2, 1982 (Thursday) ==
- As United Nations peacekeeping forces moved out of the western part of Beirut in conjunction with the departure of Palestinian and Syrian troops from Lebanon, the Lebanese Army assumed control of West Beirut for the first time in six years. The "green line" between the Muslim western section and the Christian eastern section was opened by Prime Minister Shafik Wazzan, who said in a speech at the ceremony at the "Sodeco crossing" that there should be no more division between east and west Beirut, and Muslim residents visited the eastern section for the first time since 1978.
- Died:
  - Jay Novello (stage name for Michael Romano), American character actor on radio, film and television
  - Shelly Goudreau, 34, Canadian harness racing driver, died from injuries sustained on August 27 when he was thrown from his sulky by his horse, Regan's Lad, at a race in Hollywood Park in California, and never regained consciousness after the accident. Goudreau, one of North America's leading harness racers, had earned $12 million in 2,000 races in a career that had started in 1968.

== September 3, 1982 (Friday) ==
- Sicily's Cosa Nostra organized crime element ambushed and killed the police chief of Palermo, along with his wife and an escort police officer in the town of Mondello. General Carlo Alberto Dalla Chiesa and his wife Emanuela were passing the Via Isidoro Carini when four hit men, pulled alongside Dallas Chiesa's car in two vehicles and shot the couple, firing 30 shots from AK-47 rifles. The escort officer, Domenico Russo, died from his wounds 12 days later.
- Born: Sarah Jean Burke, Canadian freestyle skier, winner of the 2005 FIS Freestyle World Ski championship in the halfpipe, and five-time Winter X Games gold medalist (2007–2009, 2011); in Barrie, Ontario
- Died: Frederic Dannay, 66, American mystery writer who wrote, along with Manfred Bennington Lee, under the pseudonym Ellery Queen

== September 4, 1982 (Saturday) ==
- An arson fire killed 25 people at an apartment building and injured 30 others in Los Angeles, California. Humberto de la Torre had an argument with his uncle and used gasoline and one match to set fire to the Dorothy Mae Apartments building at 821 Sunset Boulevard. The building, with 43 units, housed almost 200 people, most of whom were immigrants in four families from the Mexican state of Zacatecas. De la Torre would be sentenced to 625 years in prison, with a 25-year sentence for each of 25 counts of murder. The blaze would also lead to the passage of the "Dorothy Mae Law" by the state of California, retroactively requiring fire sprinklers for all residential buildings, of at least three stories in height, that were built prior to 1943.
- The Oregon Journal, the afternoon newspaper for Portland, Oregon, published its final issue after 80 years.
- Kirkland Laing, a professional welterweight boxer who was little known outside of England, scored a major upset in a tune-up fight, defeated former WBC world welterweight champion Roberto Durán in a 10-round bout in Detroit.
- Born: Ning Chang (Chang Chun-ning, also known as Janine Chang), German-born Taiwanese film and TV actress, singer and film producer in both Taiwan and mainland China; in Munich, West Germany
- Died: Jim Shampine, 41, American supermodified car driver with 8 championships in the sport, was killed in a crash during a 200-mile race at the Oswego Speedway in Oswego, New York.

== September 5, 1982 (Sunday) ==
- At Croke Park in Dublin, Kilkenny GAA won the hurling championship of Ireland, defeating Cork GAA, 3–18 to 1–13, equivalent to 27 to 16 based on three-point goals an one-point kicks.
- Died: Sir Douglas Bader, 72, British flying age credited with 22 aerial victories in World War II, who returned to being an RAF pilot in 1939 despite having both legs partially amputated in 1931

== September 6, 1982 (Monday) ==
- China's 12th Communist Party Congress approved a new party constitution that eliminated praise for the late Chairman Mao Zedong (such as "the greatest Marxist-Leninist of our time") and for Mao's Cultural Revolution, and forbidding "all forms of personality cult". Specifically, the new party constitution declared that "No party members, whatever their position, are allowed to make decisions on major issues individually," and "No leaders are allowed to practice arbitrary individual rule or place themselves above the party organization."
- Died: Toddie Lee Wynne, 85, American real estate developer of Six Flags Over Texas and financier for the first private space rocket, died three days before the successful launch of his project, the Conestoga 1 rocket.

== September 7, 1982 (Tuesday) ==
- The bodies of eight people, two of whom were children, were found in a boat that had been set on fire off of the coast of the town of Craig, Alaska and the state's Prince of Wales Island. A coroner's jury determined that all eight of the people on the fishing boat Intrepid had been killed by a .22 caliber gun before the killer or killers set the vessel ablaze. A former crewman of the Intrepid owner, Mark Coulthorse (who had been killed along with his wife and two children) would be arrested for the eight murders, but acquitted in 1988, and the case would be closed.
- Born: Emese Szász, Hungarian fencer and 2016 women's fencing gold medalist; in Budapest
- Died: Ken Boyer, 51, American baseball player and 1964 National League MVP, died from cancer.

== September 8, 1982 (Wednesday) ==
- Elections were held in the Netherlands for all 150 seats of the Tweede Kamer, the "second chamber" or lower house of the Dutch parliament, the Staten-Generaal. While no party won the required 76-seat majority, the Christen-Democratisch Appèl (CDA), led by Ruud Lubbers, finished a close second with 45 seats and was able to form a coalition government with the Volkspartij voor Vrijheid en Democratie (the People's Party for Freedom and Democracy, known as the VVD or Volkspartij), which won 36 seats, replacing the government that had been led by outgoing Prime Minister Dries van Agt of the CDA.
- The Boeing 767 wide body airliner was used in commercial service for the first time, as United Airlines Flight 1767 departed from Chicago and landed in Denver.
- Died: Sheikh Abdullah, Indian politician and Chief Minister of Jammu and Kashmir since 1975

== September 9, 1982 (Thursday) ==
- Conestoga 1, the first successful privately funded commercial rocket in history, was launched by Space Services Inc. from Matagorda Island in the U.S. state of Texas. It reached an altitude of 192 miles (309 km) with a 40 pounds (18 kg) payload in a suborbital flight.
- The first of China's Long March 2C series of launch vehicle rockets was made from Jiuquan Satellite Launch Center in Gansu province, and placed a Fanhui Shi Weixing reconnaissance satellite into low Earth orbit. Of the 88 launches made of the Long March 2C (also known as the Chang Zheng 2C) as of August 17, 2026, 86 have been successful.
- The first accident of the Chernobyl Nuclear Power Plant, near Pripyat in the Ukrainian SSR of the Soviet Union took place with a partial core meltdown of Chernobyl reactor no. 1. Because a cooling valve had remained closed after maintenance, uranium in the reactor overheated, ruptured, and released radioactive steam for several hours before the operators noticed the problem. The accident would be kept secret until after the fall of Communism, and was followed at Chernobyl by a 1984 near accident, and the April 26, 1986 Chernobyl disaster that would kill 30 people and render the city of Pripyat uninhabitable.
- Born:
  - Ai Otsuka, Japanese singer known for her 2003 hit song "Sakuranbo; in Osaka
  - Aftab Pureval, American politician who became the 70th Mayor of Cincinnati, Ohio, in 2022; in Xenia, Ohio
  - Thami Mngqolo, South African television actor; in Johannesburg.
  - Jeffrey Patneau, American CIA officer assigned to Yemen; in Minneapolis (killed in a car accident, 2008)
  - Graham Onions, English cricketer; in Gateshead, Tyne and Wear,
- Died: Tee Tee Luce, 87, Burmese philanthropist and founder of the Home for Waifs and Strays in Yangon, died in exile in England.

== September 10, 1982 (Friday) ==
- The first rescue facilitated by the international Cospas-Sarsat network, a joint venture of the space agencies of Canada, France, the Soviet Union and the United States, took place after the Soviet COSPAS-1 satellite detected a distress beacon signal the night before from the Canadian province of British Columbia and relayed the coordinates of a crashed small aircraft to Canada's ground station Defence Research Establishment Ottawa (DREO), saving the planes pilot two passengers. In its first 40 years of operation, the system was credited with the rescue of 63,745 people from 19,883 satellite detections.
- Poul Schlüter took office as the new Prime Minister of Denmark as Anker Jørgensen and his minority cabinet of Social Democrats stepped down after announcing their resignation on September 2. Schlüter formed a cabinet of Conservative People's Party ministers that was approved by Queen Margrethe II, and would serve until 1993.
- The day after the Conestoga space launch, the Arianespace company made the first commercial space launch for Europe, though the flight of Ariane 1 failed to attain orbit because of a failure in the rocket's third stage.
- Born:
  - Misty Copeland, American ballet dancer and the first African-American principal dancer in the American Ballet Theatre; in Kansas City, Missouri
  - Bret Iwan, American voice actor known for voicing the role of Mickey Mouse on television since 2009; in Pasadena, California
  - Cat Marnell, American author and editor, known for How to Murder Your Life and The Bored and the Beautiful; in Washington, D.C.
- Died: Jane Ingham, 85, English botanist

== September 11, 1982 (Saturday) ==
- The crash of a U.S. Army helicopter in West Germany killed all 46 people on board. The CH-47C Chinook had lifted off from the Mannheim City Airport taking with five U.S. Army crew and 41 passengers in preparation for a jump in conjunction with the "International Parachuting Days" event and the 375th anniversary celebration for Mannheim and was carrying 39 skydivers, of whom 23 were from France, nine from Britain, six from Germany and one from the U.S., along with two reporters from the U.S. Armed Forces Network. At an altitude of 3,000 meters (about 9850 feet) the pilot reported tecchical problems with the synchronization of the two overlapping main rotors and was attempting to return to base when the two rotor blades collided with each other during the emergency descent. The Chinnook crashed near the intersection of the A 656 autobahn and the 38a Neckarau exit.
- The Multinational Force of peacekeeping troops withdrew from Lebanon and was replaced in West Beirut by the Lebanese Army, which took the responsibility of preserving order in West Beirut, but not at the Palestinian refugee camps there.
- In the course of the "Matanza" war within the Sicilian Mafia, Benedetto Busctta and Antonio Buscetta, sons of crime boss Tommaso Buscetta, disappeared and would never be found. The "lupara bianca" kidnapping and murder, believed to have been the work of the Corleone family against the Buscetta family, along with the subsequent killings of Tomasso's brother, four nephews, a son-in-law and a brother-in-law, would lead to Tomasso electing to become an informant and witness against the Sicilian Mafia.
- Debra Maffett, "Miss California', was crowned as the new Miss America at the U.S. beauty pageant held annually in Atlantic City, New Jersey.
- Carole Pappas, the wife of former Chicago Cubs baseball star and pitcher Milt Pappas, disappeared after driving away their home in Wheaton, Illinois. The mystery remained unsolved for almost five years until August 7, 1987, when the draining of a small pond, four blocks from the Pappas home, found her 1980 Buick automobile and her body, where she had drowned in an accident.
- Born:
  - Elvan Abeylegesse, Ethiopian distance runner who held the women's 5000m world record from 2004 to 2006; in Addis Ababa, winner of two Olympic silver medals in 2008, which were disqualified in 2009 for doping; in Addis Ababa
  - Shriya Saran, Indian film actress and star of Sivaji: The Boss

== September 12, 1982 (Sunday) ==
- Bachir Gemayel, who had been elected as president of Lebanon but had not yet been sworn into office, met secretly with Israel's Defense Minister Ariel Sharon at the town of Bikfaya in Lebanon. At that time Gemayel outlined plans to send the Lebanese Army into Palestinian refugee camps to disarm any remaining PLO fighters, and agreed for the Lebanese Army to join with the Israeli Defense Forces to attack any remaining Syrian Army positions in Lebanon. Two days later, Gemayel would be assassinated before he could implement any of the terms agreed upon with Israel.
- At Olympic Park in Melbourne, the NSL Cup, the championship tournament of Australia's National Soccer League, was won by APIA Leichhardt FC of the Sydney suburb of Leichhardt, New South Wales, 2 to 1, over Heidelberg United FC of the Melbourne suburb of Heidelberg West, Victoria, before a crowd of about 5,000 people. The Leichardt team had finished in 7th place in the 16 team NSL, with a record of 12 wins and 7 draws (12–7–11) while first-place finisher Sydney City (20–5–5) had lost in the quarter-finals.
- Born:
  - Isabelle Caro, French model, television actress and spokesperson for the campaign against anorexia nervosa (d.2010); in Aubergenville, Yvelines département
  - Max Hoff, German canoeist, 2016 Olympic gold medalist and seven world championship gold medals from 2009 to 2013, and 2018 to 2019; in Troisdorf, West Germany
- Died: Franz Grothe, 73, German composer of classical music, film scores and popular songs

== September 13, 1982 (Monday) ==
- The massacre of 166 Afghan civilians and opponents to communism was carried out by the Soviet Armed forces in the town of Pad Khwab-e Shanah in the Logar Province of Afghanistan, primarily by the pouring of a flammable liquid into a hideout and the setting of it ablaze.
- The crash of Spantax Flight 995 in Spain killed 50 of the 394 people on board. The McDonnell Douglas DC-10 jet was departing from Málaga after having originated in Madrid, and was on its way to New York when the pilot aborted the takeoff and the DC-10 overran the runway, striking numerous structures at the airport, crossing a highway and colliding with several vehicles, and then bursting into flames.
- Princess Grace of Monaco, formerly the film actress Grace Kelly, wife and princess consort of Rainier III, the reigning monarch of the principality of Monaco, and mother of the future monarch, Albert II, was fatally injured in an automobile accident. The 52-year old princess had been driving with her daughter Stephanie, returning from her vacation home at Mont Agel to the royal palace when she suffered a mild cerebral hemorrhage and lost control of her car and ran off of the side of a steep road. At the Monaco Hospital with a broken femur and a non-fatal brain injury, the princess had a more severe hemorrhage and would be declared brain dead, and removed from life support the next day.
- The 31-member Politburo of the Chinese Communist Party, which effectively rules the People's Republic of China, was elected by the Central Committee with former leader Hua Guofeng being dropped from membership, along with Chen Yonggui, Geng Biao, Ji Dengkui, Liu Bocheng, Peng Chong, Wang Dongxing and Xu Shiyou. They were replaced by Hu Qiaomu, Liao Chengzhi, Song Renqiong, Wan Li, Xi Zhongxun, Yang Dezhi, and Yang Shangkun.
- Italian terrorist Licio Gelli was arrested in Switzerland while trying to withdraw tens of millions of dollars from his Swiss bank account in Geneva.
- The asteroid 3199 Nefertiti was discovered from the Palomar Observatory in the U.S. state of California by astronomers Carolyn Shoemaker and Eugene Shoemaker. Though its orbit around the sun is 722 days, its distance from the Sun is as close as 1.1272 AU or 104,780,000 miles from the Sun.
- Born: Nenê Hilario, Brazilian men's professional basketball player for Brazil and from 2002 to 2020 for the NBA; as Maybyner Rodney Hilário in São Carlos, São Paulo state
- Died: Marcus Wallenberg Jr., 82, Swedish banker who had guided the financial reconstruction of Sweden's largest companies as CEO of the Stockholms Enskilda Bank

== September 14, 1982 (Tuesday) ==
- Nine days before his scheduled inauguration, Lebanese President-elect Bachir Gemayel was killed along with 26 other people when a bomb exploded at the Phalangist headquarters in Achrafieh, where he was addressing the Lebanese Forces for the last time as their commander. At 4:10 pm, the bomb, placed by Syrian terrorist Habib Shartouni of the Syrian Social Nationalist Party in an apartment directly above the meeting room, was detonated as Gemayel was addressing the delegates.
- U.S. President Ronald Reagan issued National Security Decision Directive 55, a Top Secret order for the Pegasus Project, the classified plan for continuity of government in the event of a national disaster. Also referred to as "Nine Naught Eight" (Project 908), the directive created the secret National Program Office and established a protocol in the event of a nuclear war. The directive would be declassified in 1994 after the end of the Cold War.
- Died:
  - Princess Grace of Monaco, 52, died the day after her auto accident.
  - Kristján Eldjárn, 65, the third President of Iceland from 1968 to 1980, died in Cleveland, Ohio, while recovering from heart surgery.
  - John Gardner, 49, American writer known for On Moral Fiction (1978), was killed in a motorcycle accident near his home in Susquehanna, Pennsylvania

== September 15, 1982 (Wednesday) ==
- The first issue of USA Today, a national newspaper for the United States, was published after being developed by Al Neuharth, the chairman of Gannett Company with initial distribution in the metropolitan areas of Washington, D.C. and Baltimore, at a cost of 25 cents per issue. Along with the opening headline "America's Princess Grace killed in car wreck", Neuharth published a letter to readers that began "Welcome to USA TODAY. This country's first nationwide, satellite-delivered, general interest daily newspaper is published by Gannett, the nationwide diversified information company," and added that the paper was designed and edited to be "enlightening and enjoyable...informative and impelling... challenging and competitive," and "refreshing and rewarding".
- Argentina and Chile renewed their 1972 bilateral treaty that had submitted, to the International Court of Justice, to arbitrate a conflict over ownership the Beagle Islands. Eight months earlier, on January 21, Argentina announced its withdrawal from the treaty.
- Joe McDonald, one of the FBI's Ten Most Wanted Fugitives since 1976 for armed robbery, escape from prison and murder, was arrested by the NYPD upon arriving at New York City's Penn Station. The FBI had received a tip that McDonald was transporting weapons to New York City for the Irish Republican Army (IRA) terrorist group, and a search of his luggage found three semiautomatic weapons, three silencers, and a quantity of ammunition. McDonald would plead guilty to federal racketeering charges, and other charges were dropped because of insufficient evidence, and he would serve less than five years in prison.
- Died: Sadegh Ghotbzadeh, 46, Foreign Minister of the Islamic Republic of Iran from November 1979 to August 1980, was executed by a firing squad after being convicted on charges of having conspired to assassinate the Ayatollah Khomeini, leader of Iran.

== September 16, 1982 (Thursday) ==
- Tne massacre of thousands of Lebanese Palestinian refugees by the Phalangists, a Lebanese Christian militia, began in the Sabra and Shatila refugee camps in West Beirut at 6:00 in the evening;, four days after the assassination of the president-elect, Bachir Gemayel.
- The Lebanese National Resistance Front was founded by Walid Jumblatt after the collapse of the Lebanese National Movement in the wake of Israel's invasion of Lebanon, and began guerrilla operations against the occupying Israel Defense Forces (IDF).
- Pole Position, the most popular video arcade game of 1983, made its debut in Japan after being created by the Namco corporation. Licensed to Atari for North American distribution, it would be introduced in arcades across the United States and Canada on November 30, 1982.

== September 17, 1982 (Friday) ==
- The military government of Bolivia, led by General Guido Vildoso since July, announced its resignation in the wake of a general strike throughout the South American nation, and issued an order reconvening the National Congress to validate the results of the 1980 presidential election that had been interrupted by a military coup on July 17, 1981.
- In West Germany, a crisis that would end in the removal of Chancellor Helmut Schmidt from office began with the collapse of a coalition between Schmidt's Sozialdemokratische Partei Deutschlands (SPD, the Social Democrats) and the Freie Demokratische Partei (FDP, the Free Democrats) that had been assembled after no party won a majority in the 1980 elections for the 497-member Bundestag. With the 218 SPD seats and the 53 FDP seats, the coalition surpassed the necessary 249 seats for a majority but on September 17, all four FDP members of the cabinet— Vice Chancellor and Foreign Minister Hans-Dietrich Genscher, Interior Minister Gerhart Baum, Economy Minister Otto Graf Lambsdorff and Agriculture Minister Josef Ertl— resigned. Schmidt then named four members of his own party as replacements, and was removed by vote of the Bundestag on October 1.

== September 18, 1982 (Saturday) ==
- Tne Sabra and Shatila massacre ended at 8:00 in the morning, after 38 hours during which the Phalangist Christian militia, led by Elie Hobeika, had carried out the torture and murder of at least 762 Palestinian civilians (and perhaps as many as 3,500) as retaliation for the assassination of the President-elect, Bachir Gemayel.
- Soccer Bowl '82, the championship of the highest-level professional soccer football league in North America, the North American Soccer League (NASL) was played in San Diego before a crowd of 22,634 spectators. In a rematch of Soccer Bowl '77, the defending NASL champions, the New York Cosmos, defeated the Seattle Sounders, 1 to 0, on a goal in the 31st minute by Italian star Giorgio Chinaglia.

== September 19, 1982 (Sunday) ==
- The first emoticons were posted by Scott Fahlman, a computer scientist at Carnegie Mellon University who recognized that punctuation marks (specifically, a colon, a hyphen and a parenthesis), looked at sideways, resembled a human facial expression. In an e-mail sent to his colleagues at 11:44 in the morning, Professor Fahlman wrote "I propose that the following character sequence for joke markers: :-)" and added. "Read it sideways. Actually, it is probably more economical to mark things that are NOT jokes, given current trends. For this, use :-("
- Elections were held for all 349 seats of the Riksdag, Sweden]'s lower house of parliament. While no party won the required 175 seats for a majority, the Sveriges socialdemokratiska arbetarepart of former prime minister Olof Palme won 166 seats to oust Prime Minister Thorbjörn Fälldin, whose Centerpartiet had lost its coalition government with the departure of the Moderata samlingspartiet led by Ulf Adelsohn. Palme would take office on October 9 and serve as the leader of Sweden's government until being assassinated on February 28, 1986.
- The championship of Gaelic football was won before a crowd of 62,309 at Croke Park in Dublin by Offaly GAA over Kerry GAA, 1–15 to 0–17, equivalent to 18 to 17. With less than two minutes to play, and Kerry ahead 17–15, Offaly's Séamus Darby scored a three-point goal past Kerry's goalkeeper Charlie Nelligan, and Seán Lowry was able to catch a last-second attempt by Kerry's Mikey Sheehy at a 3-point goal that would have given Kerry its fifth consecutive win.
- The Buffalo Courier-Express, the morning newspaper for Buffalo, New York, published its final issue after having been formed in 1926 by the merger of the Buffalo Courier and the Buffalo Morning Express. The demise of the Courier-Express, with the headline "Courier Prints Its Last Edition" and the subheadline "Paper's Fall Enguishes Employees", left the afternoon Buffalo Evening News as the city's only major daily newspaper. The Evening News subsequently moved to a morning edition as The Buffalo News.
- Orlando Mercado began an eight-year career in Major League Baseball for the Seattle Mariners, and became the first, and as of 2026, only MLB player to hit a grand slam on his first time up to bat. The four-run homer came in the fourth inning and helped the Mariners defeat the visiting Texas Rangers, 9 to 7.
- Born:
  - Shital Mahajan, Indian skydiver and extreme sports athlete with eight world records in women's parachuting; in Jalgaon, Maharashtra state
  - Elena Zamolodchikova, Russian gymnast, winner of two Olympic gold medals (2000) and two world championships in the women's vault (1999 and 2002); in Moscow, Russian SFSR, Soviet Union
  - Skepta (stage name for Joseph Adenuga Jr.), British grime music MC rapper; in London

== September 20, 1982 (Monday) ==
- The village of Muabanama, located in the Lugela District of the People's Republic of Mozambique, was destroyed by guerrillas of the Revolutionary Party of Mozambique in the course of the Mozambican Civil War.
- In Allentown, Pennsylvania, three unemployed men began a contest for a local radio station, WSAN, in which they agreed to climb up to the railing on a billboard and attempt to be the longest to remain, with the prize being a modular home. Although one of the contestants, Dalton Young, was arrested on a warrant after 184 consecutive days on the billboard, the other two— Ron Kistler and Mike MacKay would remain until June 7, 1983, on the condition that both would be declared winners and get the prize.
- The Indian Astronaut Corps selected its first astronauts to represent the nation's space program, picking two IAF pilots, Rakesh Sharma and Ravish Malhotra. On April 3, 1984, Sharma would become the first Indian citizen in outer space on the Soyuz T-11 mission while Malhotra was selected as a member of the backup crew without ever serving on a mission.
- Born: Hu Ge, Chinese television and film actor, twice Magnolia Award winner and one China TV Golden Eagle Award for Best Actor; in Xuhui, Shanghai, People's Republic of China

== September 21, 1982 (Tuesday) ==
- In the United States, the National Football League Players Association (NFLPA) called a strike the day after the last game of the second week of the season (a Monday Night Football on ABC, which the Green Bay won, 27–19, over the New York Giants). Although there had been labor strikes in the preseason, the strike was the first work stoppage in the 63-year history of the National Football League (NFL). The strike would last for 57 days, canceling seven weeks of the and 98 scheduled games of the 1982 season. and reduce the season from 16 games to 9.
- An elaborate plan by five thieves, to steal AUD $600,000 in cash (worth about $575,000 in USD at the time) from the Reserve Bank of Australia was foiled by porters at the airport in West Rockhampton, Queensland. Cargo was being unloaded from a Trans Australia Airlines (TAA) flight from Canberra when the baggage crew noticed a man's hand behind one of the freight boxes. The stowaway, Lance James Woolcock, had hidden inside the freight box, which carried AUD$200,000, and was unable to run far because of oxygen deprivation and air sickness. Other men were found in freight boxes on TAA flights that had landed in Mount Isa, Townsville and Brisbane.
- The first International Day of Peace was proclaimed by the United Nations.
- Died: Ivan Bagramyan, 84, Marshal of the Soviet Union during World War II

== September 22, 1982 (Wednesday) ==
- The publishers of the American monthly magazine Reader's Digest, noted for the feature of "condensing" books and reprinted articles into abridged versions by editing of content, published a "condensed" form for the Revised Standard Version (RSV) of the Holy Bible. The seven-year project was carried out by an editing team led by John Evangelist Walsh, with the final appraisal by a Presbyterian minister and Biblical scholar, Bruce M. Metzger. Overall, the Reader's Digest Bible expunged 40% of the RSV (55% of the Old Testament and 25% of the New Testament).
- The popular American situation comedy Family Ties made its debut on the NBC television network. Created and produced by Gary David Goldberg and starring Michael J. Fox as the conservative son of liberal parents Michael Gross (actor) and Meredith Baxter, the show would win multiple awards (including three Emmy Awards for Fox) and run for seven seasons, ending with a farewell episode on May 14, 1989.
- The largest American chain of hair salons and barber shops, Great Clips, opened its first of more than 4,500 locations under the name "Super Clips" in Rochester, Minnesota at the University of Minnesota.
- Born:
  - Masud Gharahkhani, Iranian-born Norwegian politician and President of Norway's Storting parliament since 2021; in Tehran
  - Kosuke Kitajima, Japanese swimmer and four-time Olympic gold medalist in 2004 and 2008; in Tokyo
  - Maarten Stekelenburg, Dutch soccer football goalkeeper with 63 caps for the Netherlands national team; in Haarlem
  - Billie Piper, English actress and singer; in Swindon, Wiltshire

== September 23, 1982 (Thursday) ==
- The National Congress of Bolivia held a vote for the nation's president that had originally been scheduled for August 6, 1980, but had been interrupted by a military coup 20 days before the vote had taken place. With the military government stepping aside and ordering the National Congress to resume its session, Hernán Siles Zuazo, the front-runner in 1980, was approved over former President Hugo Banzer by a margin of 113 to 29.
- Amine Gemayel, brother of the recently assassinated president-elected Bachir Gemayel, took office as the 8th President of Lebanon after having been selected unanimously (77–0) by the Lebanese parliament on September 21.
- A Doll's Life, a musical that was the largest failure of the year on Broadway, opened at the Mark Hellinger Theatre. Although one of its actors, Peter Gallagher, would win the 1983 Theatre World Award and the production would receive three nominations for a Tony Award, A Doll's Life closed three days later after only five performances and bad reviews from New York's theater critics, including the comment by Frank Rich of the New York Times who said that the producers had "inflated a spectacularly unpromising premise with loads of money, good intentions and hard work, only to end up with a show that collapses in its prologue and then skids into a toboggan slide from which there is no return."
- Born: Alyssa Sutherland, Australian television actress; in Brisbane
- Died: Jimmy Wakely, 68, American country and western singer with eleven No. 1 hits

== September 24, 1982 (Friday) ==
- Prime Minister of Margaret Thatcher of the United Kingdom was hosted in Beijing by Deng Xiaoping, the Vice-Premier and leader of the People's Republic of China, regarding the future of British Hong Kong, a territory that had been leased to Britain by the Chinese Empire for a term of 99 years, starting in 1898. In the meeting, Deng informed Thatcher that the Chinese government had decided to recover all of the Hong Kong region at the expiration of the lease on July 1, 1997, but that the communist government of China would preserve the autonomy of Hong Kong, which had one of the largest capitalist economies in Asia. Following negotiations, Britain and China would issue the Sino-British Joint Declaration on December 19, 1984, with the transfer of Hong Kong to China taking place at 12:00 a.m. on July 1, 1997.
- The "Wimpy Operation", the first act of armed resistance against Israeli troops in Beirut, began when Khaled Alwan of the Syrian Social Nationalist Party opened fire on Israeli officers dining at a Wimpy Hamburgers restaurant. An IDF officer was killed, and two soldiers were wounded.
- The Woolco discount department store chain announced that it would close all 336 of its remaining U.S. stores after years of deficits, although the chain would continue to operate its 120 stores in Canada. By the end of January 1983, all Woolco locations in the United States would be closed permanently and the company had made the largest liquidation of assets in U.S. history up to that time, with one billion dollars of inventory to be disposed of.
- The U.S. Centers for Disease Control (CDC) published its first definition of "a disease at least moderately predictive of a defect in cell-mediated immunity, occurring in a person with no known case for diminished resistance to that disease," and began using its official term for the illness, Acquired Immune Deficiency Syndrome, abbreviated thereafter to the acronym "AIDS".
- The popular American TV action series Knight Rider, starring David Hasselhoff as private detective Michael Knight, and including the voice of William Daniels as the voice of KITT, a computerized, artificially intelligent Trans Am sports car with numerous optional features, premiered on NBC. Produced by Glen Larson, the show would run for four seasons and 90 episodes, concluding on April 4, 1986.
- Died: Sarah Churchill, 67, English actress, author and poet who was the daughter of British statesman Winston Churchill

== September 25, 1982 (Saturday) ==
- In Israel, 400,000 marchers, or about 10% of Israel's population, organized by the Israeli Peace Now group, demanded the resignation of Prime Minister Menachem Begin and Defense Minister Ariel Sharon and demanded an investigation of Israel's role and failures in the recent massacre of more than 1,300 refugees in Lebanon.
- In Wilkes-Barre, Pennsylvania in the U.S., a mentally-ill man who had formerly been a prison guard, George Emil Banks, shot and killed 13 people with an AR-15 semi-automatic rifle. In the morning, Banks killed three former girlfriends and five children in his home, then shot two men (one fatally) who happened to be walking out of a home across the street, then went to a mobile home and killed two women and two children. Banks would be convicted of eight of the murders and sentenced to death, but never found to be competent enough to qualify for execution, and would die in prison in 2025.
- The Carlton Blues defeated the Richmond Tigers 14.19 to 12.13 (equivalent to 103 to 85, based on 6-point goals plus points after) to win the championship of the Victorian Football League (VFL), the highest-level of professional Australian football. The game between the two teams, both from suburbs of Melbourne, was watched by 107,536 spectators.
- The Des Moines Tribune, the afternoon paper for the largest city in the U.S. state of Iowa, published its final issue after its circulation had dropped to 68,000 readers. It was then absorbed by the morning newspaper, the Des Moines Register.
- Born: Hyun Bin (stage name for Kim Tae-pyung, South Korean film and television actor; in Seoul

== September 26, 1982 (Sunday) ==
- With all National Football League games canceled because of a players' strike, NBC provided live coverage of a Canadian Football League game, with the British Columbia Lions beating the Toronto Argonauts, 46–14, followed by the Edmonton Eskimos defeating the visiting Calgary Stampeders, 36–17.
- A thermal took Australian parachutist Rich Collins up to an altitude of 2,800 metres (9,200 ft) during a jump. Collins almost blacked from the lack of oxygen, but he was able to release his main parachute to fall to a lower altitude, after which he landed with reserve parachute.
- Born: Sun Li, Chinese film actress; in Shanghai

== September 27, 1982 (Monday) ==
- Pakistan's President, General Muhammad Zia-ul-Haq, created Martial Law Regulation 53 by executive decree, expanding the death penalty to "any offense liable to cause insecurity, fear or despondency amongst the public," which included "any act with intent to impair the efficiency or impede the working" of public property or the smooth functioning of government, or of abetting the commission of such acts "in any manner whastsoever" or failing to inform authorities about the location of an accused perpetrator. The regulation provided a "guilty until proven innocent" measure of proof ("A military court on the basis of police or any other investigation alone may, unless the contrary is proved, presume that this accused has committed the offense charged") and made the punishment retroactive to cover crimes committed on or after July 5, 1977.
- New Zealand's Prime Minister Robert Muldoon announced the nationwide freezing of wages and prices in order to reduce inflation and to offset the deficits from borrowing money to finance his government's "Think Big" industrial and energy related projects. Muldoon announced that the Wage Freeze Regulations would prevent the increase of employee wages or consumer product prices for almost nine months, to expire on June 22, 1983.
- Born:
  - Lil Wayne (stage name for Dwayne Carter Jr.), American rapper and record executive; in New Orleans
  - Markus Rosenberg, Swedish footballer with 33 caps for the Sweden national team; in Malmö

== September 28, 1982 (Tuesday) ==
- The government of Israel, led by Prime Minister Menachem Begin, created the Kahan Commission to inveestigate the Sabra and Shatila massacre of Palestinian refugees that had taken place 12 days earlier. The three-member commission, created in response to public criticism of the government's failure to respond to the murder of more than 1,200 civilians, was chaired by the chief judge of the Israeli Supreme Court, Yitzhak Kahan, and had fellow judge Aharon Barak and retired Major General Yona Efrat. The Kahan Commission would release its final report on February 8, 1983.
- The minor planet 100000 Astronautica was discovered by astronomer James B. Gibson of the Palomar Observatory, and provisionally designated "1982 SH_{1}". Though not the 100,000th asteroid discovered, it would be the 100,000th to be given a name, with the redesignation in 2007 to recognize the 50th anniversary of the 1957 launch of Sputnik into orbit and the beginning of the "Space Age".
- Born:
  - Ranbir Kapoor, Indian film actor known for Barfi! (2012) and Sanju (2018); in Mumbai
  - Emeka Okafor, American basketball player who was the 2005 NBA Rookie of the Year; in Houston
  - St. Vincent (stage name for Anne Erin Clark), American rock guitarist; in Tulsa, Oklahoma
  - Abhinav Bindra, Indian men's shooting champion, 2008 Olympic gold medalist and 2006 World Champion; in Dehradun, Uttarakhand state
  - Anderson Varejão, Brazilian basketball player in the NBA, for the Cleveland Cavaliers from 2004 to 2016; in Colatina, Espírito Santo
- Died:
  - Larry Breeding, 36, American television actor and comedian known for Who's Watching the Kids? (1978–79) and comedy The Last Resort (1979–80), was killed in a single-car traffic accident.
  - Mabel Albertson, 81, American stage, film, radio and television actress with a 47-year career in acting, primarily known for the TV show Bewitched as Phyllis Stephens, the mother-in-law of Samantha Stevens;

== September 29, 1982 (Wednesday) ==
- The first victim of the poisoning of Tylenol pills, 12-year-old Mary Kellerman, died in a hospital the day after she had swallowed a capsule of Extra-Strength Tylenol capsules with potassium cyanide. On the same day, six other people in the Chicago suburb of Arlington Heights, Illinois swallowed capsules from a bottle that had been purchased earlier that day at a local drugstore, and all six died. A public official, Helen Jensen, visited the household of Stanley and Theresa Janus and discovered the bottle, and saw that six pills had been taken. The perpetrator had tainted 10 of the 50 pills in a randomly-selected bottle of the nonprescription pain killer. As a result of the poisonings, tamper-resistant packaging would be implemented by the packagers of pharmaceutical products and other items designed to be swallowed.
- The Israel Defense Forces, which had invaded Lebanon almost four months earlier, on June 6, withdrew from Beirut to be replaced by a multinational peacekeeping force with troops from the U.S., the UK, France and Italy. Israel increased its occupation of southern Lebanon.
- The crash of Aeroflot Flight 343 killed seven people and injured the other 70 on board, when the Ilyushin Il-62 ran off the runway while landing at Luxembourg City. The flight had departed from the Sheremetyevo International Airport in Moscow three hours earlier, with a final scheduled destination of Lima in Peru, with stopovers in Luxembourg and in Havana in Cuba. Upon landing, the thrust reversers on Flight 343 failed and the pilot was unable to control the aircraft, which off of the runway and down a hill into a wooded ravine, where it caught on fire.
- The BBC Two documentary program Timewatch aired its first episode, "Windsors' War", and would continue for 29 years until November 15, 2011.
- Born: Amy Williams, English skeleton bobsled racer; in Cambridge
- Died: Monty Stratton, 70, American baseball pitcher for the Chicago White Sox from 1934 to 1938 until he lost his right leg from a hunting accident, later known for playing minor league baseball while adapting to a prosthetic limb

== September 30, 1982 (Thursday) ==
- The American situation comedy Cheers premiered on the NBC television network and starred Ted Danson and Shelley Long. Although it was one of the lowest-rated shows of the 1982–83 season, finishing in 74th place out of 77 shows for its premiere, it would continue for 11 seasons and 275 episodes until its season finale on May 20, 1993.
- Financier and co-pilot Ross Perot Jr., and pilot Jay Coburn became the first people to fly a helicopter, The Spirit of Texas around the world, landing in Dallas 29 days after their September 1 departure. The travelers were accompanied by an 11-member support and maintenance team that flew along in a separate Hercules airplane.
- Portugal's ruling Conselho da Revolução (Council of the Revolution), a 20-member body composed primarily of military officers, disbanded after seven years following its completion of Portugal's transition to democracy.
- The last telegram used in the United Kingdom was delivered by a courier, less than a year after the October 19 announcement by British Telecom that the service would be discontinued. The service was replaced by the company's "Telemessage" service, an overnight delivery mail of messages dictated over the telephone or sent by telex.
- Jos van Kemenade, who was attempting to become Prime Minister of the Netherlands by forming a coalition government at the request of Queen Beatrix, announced that he had failed to negotiate an agreement between his own Labor Party and the Christian Democratic Appeal (CDA). A new government would not be formed until November 4, when Ruud Lubbers of the CDA was able to secure participation of the People's Party (VVD).
- Born:
  - Stephen Cohen, American computer scientist, entrepreneur and multi-billionaire, president of Palantir Technologies
  - Li Xiaolu, also known as Jacqueline Li; Chinese film and television actress and singer; in Beijing
  - Lacey Chabert, American television actress known for Party of Five and for multiple Hallmark Christmas films; in Hattiesburg, Mississippi
  - Kieran Culkin, American actor on stage, film and TV; in New York City
