= 1982 Grand Prairie warehouse shootings =

Mass shooting in Texas, US

- Location of Grand Prairie in Texas
- Location: Grand Prairie, Texas, US
- Date: August 9, 1982 c. 8:02 a.m. – 8:27 a.m. (Central Time Zone)
- Attack type: Mass shooting, truck attack, shootout
- Weapons: M1 carbine.25-caliber semi-automatic pistol.38-caliber revolver
- Deaths: 6
- Injuries: 5 (three by gunshot, one by vehicular ramming, one indirectly)
- Perpetrator: John Felton Parish
- Motive: Dispute over payment

On August 9, 1982, a mass shooting and vehicle-ramming attack took place in Grand Prairie, Texas, United States. Six people were killed and three were injured at two warehouses before the perpetrator, 49-year-old John Parish, fled the scene in a stolen semi-trailer truck. Following a high-speed chase through the city's downtown area, Parish broke through a police barricade, injuring an officer, and crashed into a building. He was subsequently killed by police during a shootout.

It was the worst mass shooting in Dallas–Fort Worth history at that time.

== Incident ==
=== Western Transportation shooting ===
At approximately 8:00 a.m. on August 9, 1982, John Parish, armed with a shortened M1 carbine, a .25-caliber semi-automatic pistol, and a .38-caliber revolver, entered the Western Transportation Company building in the central business district of Grand Prairie, to discuss an unresolved payment dispute with his supervisor Eddie Ulrich. During the conversation, Parish killed Ulrich, as well as truck driver Martin Moran and operations manager Moody Smith, before stealing a bobtail truck and driving to the Western Transportation Company office half a block down the street. Inside, he killed executive secretary Wyvonne Kohler and wounded receptionist Ruth James with shots in her shoulder and neck, as well as operations manager Burnett Hart with a shot to the head. He also took office worker Vicki Smallwood hostage for a while, to find an executive named Mike, threatening: "If he's not in, you're dead." After failing to locate the executive, Parish recognized Smallwood as the wife of an acquainted mechanic and let her go.

=== Jewel-T shooting ===
Parish next drove to Jewel-T warehouse about four miles away, arriving there a few minutes later. There he killed district sales manager Dave Bahl, and then went to the shipping office, where he was confronted by warehouse supervisor Richard Svoboda. Parish put his revolver to Svoboda's jaw and killed him, and then shot him again in the face when he was lying on the floor. Parish also wounded shipping supervisor Robert Sarabia after chasing him.

=== Truck hijacking and car chase ===
Parish left the building and approached an 18-wheeler tractor-trailer loaded with cookies. Parish engaged in a scuffle with the truck's driver, Carl Lorentz, during which Lorentz broke his foot and fled. Hijacking the truck, Parish left the compound of Jewel-T warehouse and drove through downtown Grand Prairie, chased by police. After 1.5 miles (2.4 km), Parish neared a police barricade, where he was shot at by police officer Alan T. Patton, who was taking cover behind his patrol car. Parish intentionally crashed into Patton's vehicle at 70 miles per hour (110 km/h), flinging the patrol car 20 feet (6.1 m) back while Patton was thrown back between 50 feet (15 m) and 100 feet (30 m), sustaining a fractured ankle, a broken jaw, a punctured lung, and several lacerations to the face. The truck then knocked down a utility pole and crashed, together with another car, into a building owned by the E.L. Murphy Trucking Company. Upon hitting the wall the truck overturned. Parish crawled out of the stolen vehicle, shooting at the officers, and made his way into the building through a hole in a wall, where he was killed by police with seven or eight shots at 8:27 a.m. The shooting had lasted 25 minutes.

During the shooting, Parish had used all three of his weapons, mostly the M1 carbine (which he fired about 28 times) and his revolver; only one shot was fired with his semi-automatic pistol.

== Victims ==
All of the gunshot injuries and the run-down police officer had been seriously wounded. Within the day, Alan Patton was in stable condition, Ruth James and Burnett Hart were in guarded condition and Robert Sarabia remained in critical condition. According to Grand Prairie Police Chief David Kunkle, Parish had previously quarrelled with all of the male victims at the warehouses, noting that the two female victims "just happened to be in the wrong place at the wrong time".

=== Killed ===
- Eddie Eugene Ulrich, 40, supervisor at Western Transfer & Storage
- Martin Douglas Moran, 30, truck driver for Western Transfer & Storage
- Moody Charles Smith, 58, operations manager at Western Transfer & Storage
- Wyvonne Kohler, 45, executive secretary at Western Transfer & Storage
- Dave Bahl, 28, district sales manager at Jewel-T warehouse
- Richard T. Svoboda, 37, distribution manager at Jewel-T warehouse

=== Injured ===
- Ruth James, 19, receptionist for Western Transfer & Storage
- Burnett Hart, 42, operations manager at Western Transfer & Storage
- Robert Sarabia, 30, supervisor at Jewel-T warehouse
- Carl Lorentz, 57, truck driver for Jewel-T warehouse
- Alan T. Patton, 28, police officer

== Perpetrator ==

John Felton Parish was a resident of Dallas since 1980, after previously living in Indianapolis. Before his employment in Grand Prairie, he had worked as a truck driver for twenty years in Kansas City, Missouri, Kentucky, and Illinois. He provided a false address in public records.

Parish, who had no police record and was described by his supervisors as an easy-going person, worked for Jewel-T warehouse for eight months before joining the Western Transportation Company in September 1980. Staff at Jewel-T referred to Parish as a troublemaker, leading Jewel-T supervisor Richard T. Svoboda to have him taken off a contract job Western Transportation had with Jewel-T, resulting in Parish being banned from deliveries for said company.

Parish was married and had three children, though he was estranged from his wife and had lost a child-custody battle against her shortly before the shooting. Also the same year his brother needed a second kidney transplant and his older sister died from cancer. In the two weeks prior to the shooting Parish had a pay dispute with Western Transportation and had complained to supervisor Eddie Ulrich that he was owed $1,600 of outstanding pay. Ulrich rejected his claims, explaining that he had earned less because he had worked less. Parish told his brother of his plans to "go in and see and see them about [the money]" and that "they could work it out, if they talked to him like a man, and didn't treat him like a fool".
