= Kazuo Iwama (Sony) =

Kazuo Iwama (岩間 和夫, Iwama Kazuo; 1919–1982) was a Japanese engineer who became the president of Sony.

Iwama was born in Nagoya and studied geophysics. He worked in a seismology laboratory at the University of Tokyo until 1946, when Akio Morita hired him to work at a predecessor of Sony. By 1950, he was a director of the company. At Sony, he helped introduce the first Japanese transistor radio in 1954, and the first transistor television set in 1960. He headed the Sony Corporation of America from 1971 to 1973, and became president of Sony from 1976 until his death of colon cancer on August 25, 1982.
