= NGC 521 =

Spiral galaxy in the constellation Cetus

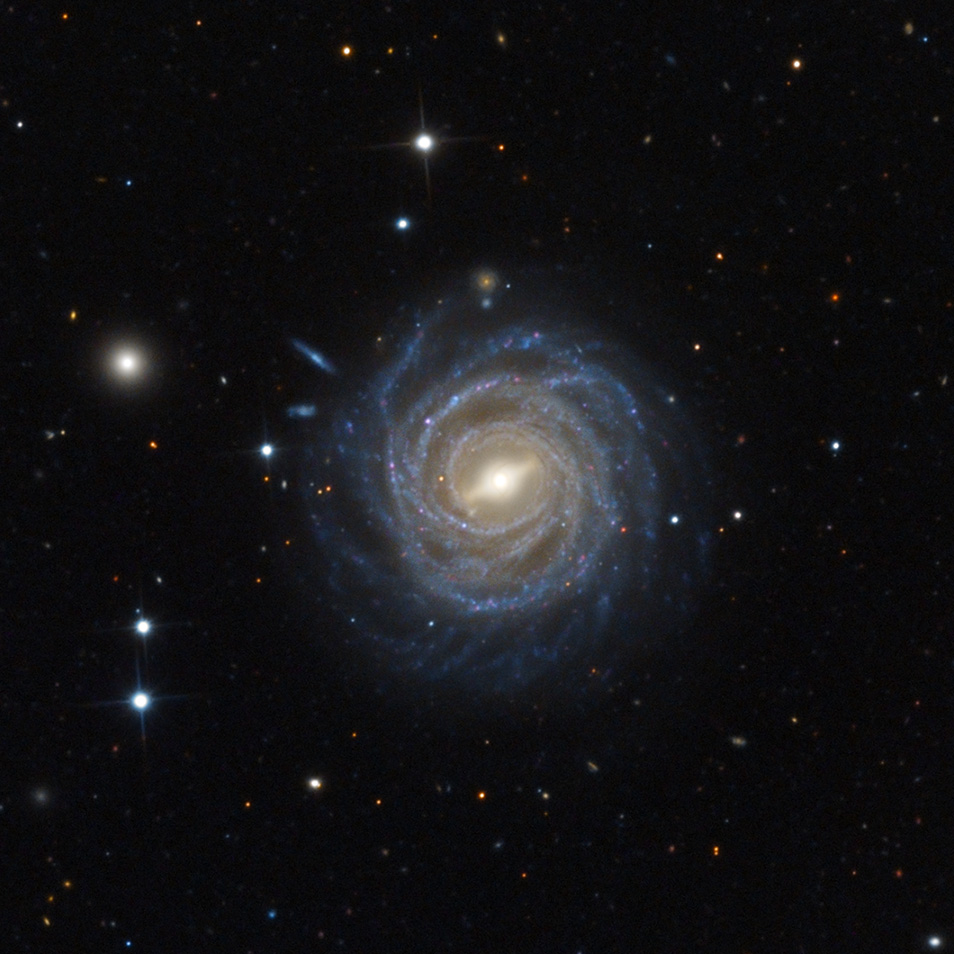
- NGC 521 as seen on an image recorded the Mount Lemmon Observatory using the 32-inch Schulman reflecting telescope in 2015

Observation data (J2000 epoch)
- Constellation: Cetus
- Right ascension: 01^{h} 24^{m} 33.8^{s}
- Declination: +01° 24′ 33.8″
- Redshift: 0.016902
- Heliocentric radial velocity: 5024.3 km/s
- Distance: 224 Mly
- Apparent magnitude (V): 11.7
- Apparent magnitude (B): 12.5

Characteristics
- Type: SB(r)bc
- Size: 127,500 ly (39.06 kpc) (estimated)
- Apparent size (V): 2.7' × 2.4'

Other designations
- PGC 5190, UGC 962, GC 304, MGC +00-04-118, 2MASS J01243377+0143532, h 115, IRAS 01219+0128

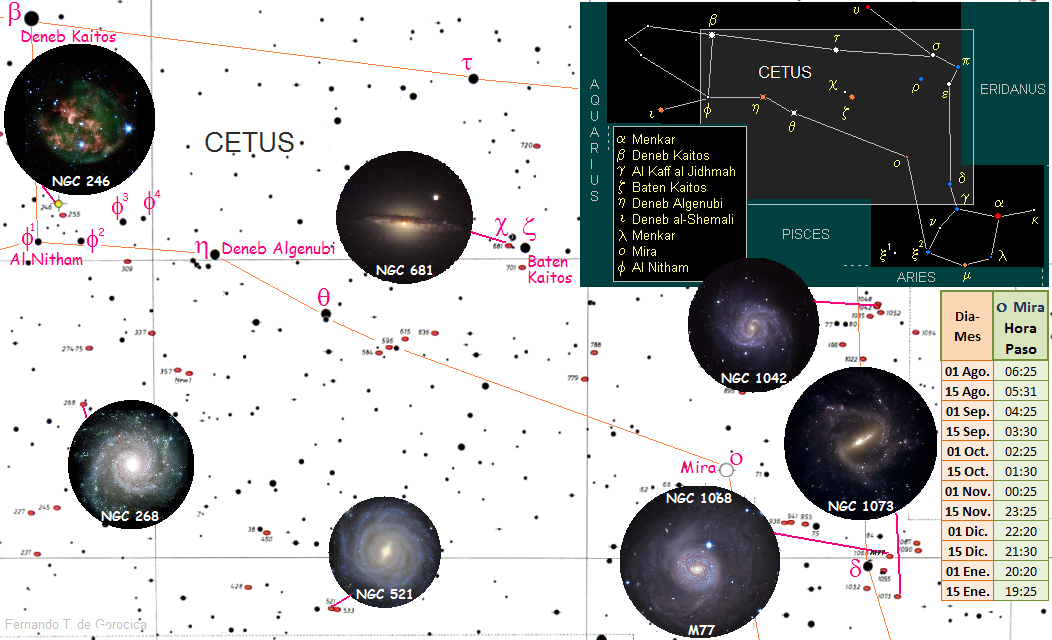
NGC 521's location in the Cetus constellation

NGC 521, also occasionally referred to as PGC 5190 or UGC 962, is a barred spiral galaxy located approximately 224 million light-years from the Solar System in the constellation Cetus. It was discovered on 8 October 1785 by astronomer William Herschel.

== Observation history ==
=== Historic observation ===
Herschel described his discovery as "faint, pretty large, irregular round, brighter middle". Further observations were made by both his son, John Herschel, who simply noted "big" on his first and "very faint" on his second observation, as well as R. J. Mitchell, who noted "pretty big, spiral galaxy, disc enveloped in faint outlying neby and looks like an unresolved cluster." NGC 521 was later catalogued by John Louis Emil Dreyer in the New General Catalogue, where the galaxy was described as "faint, pretty large, round, gradually brighter middle".

== Supernovae ==
Three supernovae have been observed in NGC 521:

- SN 1966G (Type Ia, mag. 15.5) was discovered by Dr. Gibson Reaves on 16 August 1966.
- SN 1982O (type unknown, mag. 15) was discovered by Miklós Lovas on 19 August 1982.
- SN 2006G (Type II, mag. 17.5) was discovered by the Lick Observatory Supernova Search (LOSS) on 13 January 2006.

== Description ==
The galaxy's large apparent size can be attributed to the fact that it is face-on. Despite its size, it only has an apparent visual magnitude of 11.7. It can be classified as spiral galaxy of type SBbc using the Hubble Sequence. The object's distance of roughly 220 million light-years from the Solar System can be estimated using its redshift and Hubble's law.

== See also ==
- List of NGC objects (1–1000)
