= Ramappa Balappa Bidari =

Indian politician

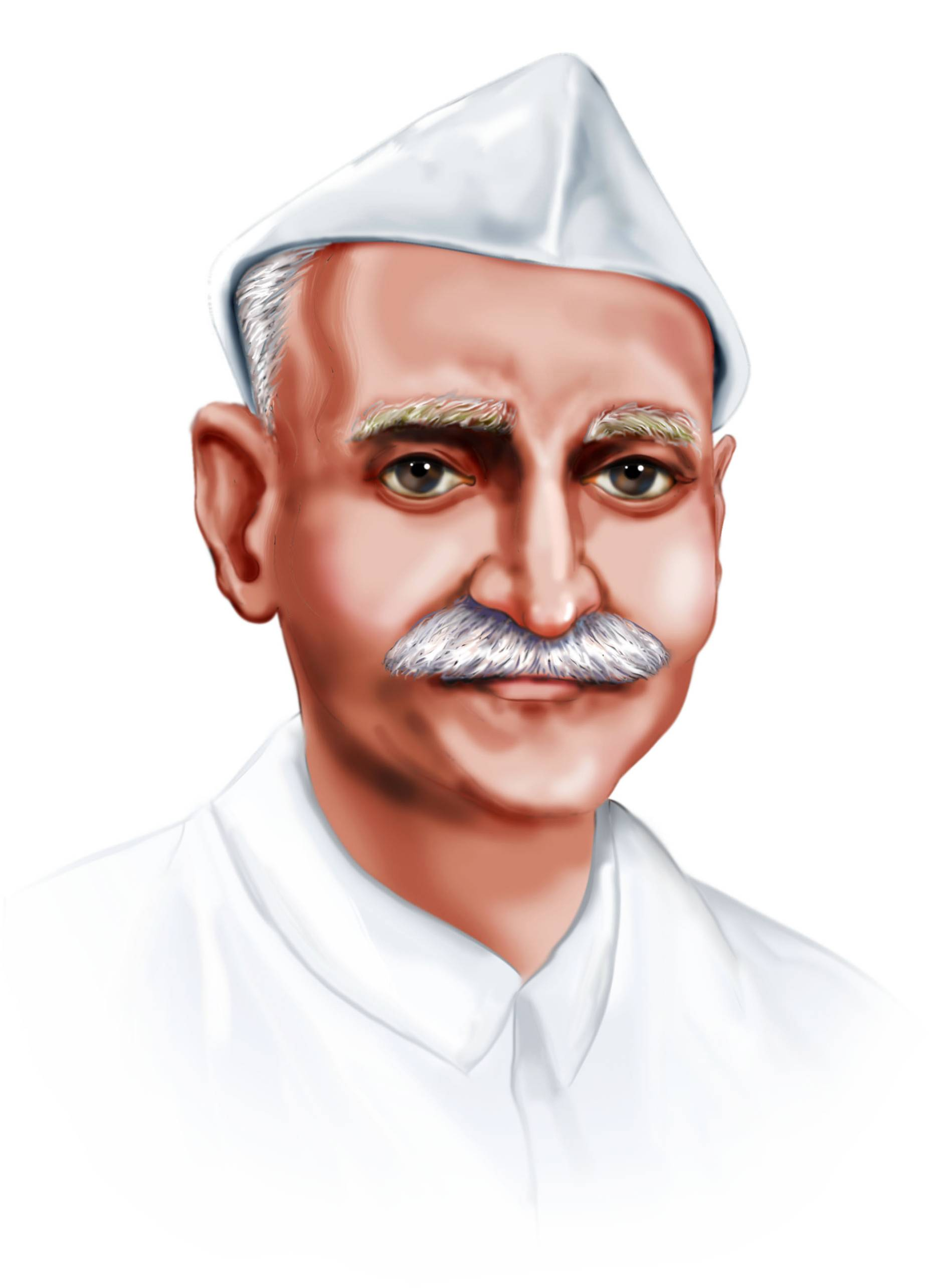

Prime Minister of Aundh
- In office 1941–1947
- Constituency: Bijapur, Karnataka

Member of Parliament
- In office 1952–1962
- Constituency: Bijapur, Karnataka

Vice President of BLDEA
- In office 1972–1980

Personal details
- Born: 3 October 1898 Budhni-Meerj, Mudhol Princely State
- Died: 31 August 1982 (aged 83) Bangalore
- Spouse(s): Chinnabai, Tarabai

Sri Ramappa Balappa Bidari (3 October 1898 – 31 August 1982) was an Indian freedom fighter, lawyer, Gandhian, social reformer, and politician who played a seminal role in shaping grassroots democratic governance in pre-independent India. He was the Prime Minister of the Princely State of Aundh (India), from 1941 until its merger with the Indian Union in 1948, during which he implemented India’s earliest experiment in Gram Swaraj, or village self-rule. Following independence, he served two terms as a Member of Parliament, representing Bijapura South (present-day Bagalkote), and remained an advocate of land reforms, cooperative banking, Panchayati Raj, and anti-corruption.

== Early years ==
Ramappa Balappa Bidari was born on 3 October 1898 in Mirji (Budhni) village of Mudhol Taluk, then part of the princely state of Mudhol, in present-day Bagalkote district, Karnataka. He hailed from the Konnappanavar family of Bidari, known for their wealth, landholdings, and service to the community. His father, Balappa, died during a plague outbreak, leaving young Ramappa to be raised by his mother, Kashibai, a woman of strength and foresight.

The early loss of his father imbued Ramappa with resilience and self-discipline. His mother played a central role in nurturing his education in a region where schooling was still uncommon. He completed his primary education in Bidari and matriculated from Bijapura Government Secondary School in 1919, securing a First Class. This academic achievement marked him out as an exceptional student.

He pursued higher education at Fergusson College, Pune, one of India’s leading institutions at the time, and graduated in 1923 with a degree in Political Science and Economics. He then completed a Law degree in 1926, also in Pune, making him one of the few formally educated professionals from his region during the colonial period.

== Legal Career and Agricultural Transformation ==
Upon returning to Karnataka, Bidari began practicing law in Bijapura and Bagalkote. However, his heart remained with rural India. He soon found the legal profession unfulfilling and withdrew voluntarily after only a few years. His decision to pivot towards agriculture was both ideological and practical.

In the late 1920s and early 1930s, he became an innovative agriculturalist, applying modern methods such as seed selection, manure blending, and irrigation experiments on his lands in Honaganahalli, Gunadala, Bidari, and Logaum. His model farms became centers of rural education, where he trained farmers, distributed reading material, and collaborated with the British Agricultural Department.

Bidari’s efforts caught the attention of the administration. He was appointed as a Class I Honorary Magistrate in 1937, even as he expanded his footprint in cooperative banking. He served as Secretary of the Bijapura Taluk Sahakari Abhivriddhi Sangha (1928), Vice President of the Bijapura District Central Co-operative Bank (1929), and later, Director of the D.C.C. Bank (1930).

== Political Awakening and Freedom Movement ==
Although he held a quasi-official position under British authority, Bidari’s soul aligned with the Indian national movement. The turning point came through his association with Sugandhi Murigeppa, a senior Congress worker in Bijapura. Murigeppa ceremonially replaced Bidari’s royal turban with a Gandhi cap, symbolising his transition from a privileged zamindar to a servant of the people.

Bidari formally joined the Indian National Congress, and by 1939, responded to Gandhi’s call for Satyagraha. Though he applied to become a Satyagrahi, Gandhi personally rejected his application, redirecting him toward a unique constitutional mission: to assist in establishing a model of Gram Swaraj in the Princely State of Aundh.

== The Aundh Experiment and the First Gram Swaraj Model ==
Historical Context The princely state of Aundh, located in present-day Maharashtra, was one of the few Indian states where progressive constitutional reform was attempted before Indian independence. Ruled by Maharaja Bhawanrao Shriniwasrao Pant Pratinidhi, the state came under national spotlight in the 1930s for voluntarily initiating self-rule, inspired by Mahatma Gandhi’s concept of Gram Swaraj. The state had a reputation for being reform-minded, but it was the convergence of visionary figures—Appa Saheb Pant, Ramappa Bidari, and Maurice Frydman—that propelled Aundh into history.

In 1937, during a tour of North Karnataka, Yuvaraja Appa Saheb Pant encountered Ramappa Bidari at Kotyal. The meeting between the prince and the Kannada-speaking lawyer-turned-reformer was fortuitous. The two men, bonded by a shared admiration for Gandhian ideals, stayed in touch and later began working together on a constitutional reform project under Gandhi’s mentorship.

== Role of Mahatma Gandhi and Maurice Frydman ==
Mahatma Gandhi played a direct advisory role in the Aundh reform initiative. He had long advocated that true independence must begin in the villages, through decentralised, self-sufficient, participatory governance. When Ramappa Bidari applied to join the Satyagraha Movement in 1939, Gandhi reportedly declined, stating that his services were needed elsewhere—specifically, in the implementation of Gram Swaraj in Aundh.

Working closely with Gandhi’s guidance was Maurice Frydman, a Polish engineer, inventor, and mystic who had renounced Western comforts to embrace Indian spiritual and social reform. Frydman helped frame the Aundh Constitution, a pioneering document that reimagined the state as a federation of autonomous, self-governing villages.

== Bidari’s Administrative Leadership ==
Ramappa Bidari initially joined the state as a minister, responsible for grassroots implementation of constitutional ideas. His administrative skills, deep understanding of rural India, and experience with cooperative banking made him indispensable. In 1941, he was appointed Prime Minister of Aundh, becoming the chief executive of India’s first laboratory of decentralized democracy.

During his tenure (1941–1948), Bidari overhauled Aundh’s governance along Gandhian lines: • Village Panchayats were established with real legislative powers. These were not merely advisory bodies but autonomous institutions empowered to make decisions on local budgets, disputes, education, and public works. • At the Taluk level, representative Samitis (committees) coordinated inter-village governance, ensuring coherence while respecting local autonomy. • Transparency and accountability mechanisms were instituted, including citizen audits and open village meetings, decades before these became part of Indian governance norms. • Education was prioritized with the establishment of primary schools in nearly every village, adult literacy programs, and mobile libraries. Bidari believed that an informed citizenry was a prerequisite for effective self-rule. • Healthcare saw decentralized improvements with community-funded dispensaries, midwife training, and hygiene awareness campaigns. • Public works like roads, wells, and irrigation canals were executed through Shramadana (voluntary labor), emphasizing collective responsibility over reliance on state machinery. Under Bidari’s stewardship, Aundh became debt-free, a rarity among princely states. Local taxes were efficiently collected and reinvested into development. Corruption was virtually absent, and state officials, inspired by Bidari’s personal austerity, adopted simple lifestyles.

== Social Dynamics and Bidari’s Unique Position ==
Although Aundh was a Marathi-speaking state with a largely Brahmin-dominated administrative structure, Bidari—a Kannada-speaking Lingayat—rose to the highest executive post. His acceptance was not driven by royal favor but by grassroots respect, ideological clarity, and administrative merit. His leadership style was soft-spoken, non-authoritarian, and deeply collaborative. Importantly, the Aundh model predated and influenced India’s Panchayati Raj system, which was formalized through the 73rd Constitutional Amendment only in 1992. Scholars have often noted that Bidari and Aundh implemented what Nehruvian planners would later merely theorize.

== Transition and Resignation ==
In 1948, following the Indian independence and the integration of princely states, Aundh merged with the Bombay Province. Unlike many princely officials who resisted or negotiated for privileges, Bidari resigned voluntarily, stating that he had merely been a caretaker for a mission entrusted by Gandhiji. He declined further administrative positions and returned to Karnataka, where he resumed his service through the Indian National Congress and grassroots organizations.

== Parliamentary Career and Continued Public Service ==
Ramappa Bidari returned to electoral politics after independence: • Member of the Land Reforms Committee (1948) • Elected to the 1st Lok Sabha from Bijapura South in 1952 • Re-elected to the 2nd Lok Sabha in 1957

In Parliament, Bidari devoted his efforts to a wide range of rural and structural reforms. He was a strong advocate for equitable land redistribution and tenancy rights, consistently raising the plight of small and marginal farmers. He emphasized the importance of minimum support pricing to safeguard agricultural incomes and prevent exploitation in volatile markets. Recognizing the transformative role of rural finance, he pushed for the expansion and modernization of cooperative institutions. Bidari also highlighted the need for soil conservation, sustainable agriculture, and minor irrigation schemes tailored to drought-prone regions like North Karnataka. As a committed Gandhian, he was a vocal proponent of decentralized governance, urging the institutional strengthening of Panchayati Raj bodies. During debates on state reorganization, he strongly defended the cultural and administrative unity of Kannada-speaking populations, advocating for their inclusion in a consolidated Karnataka state.

He served as President of the Bijapura Zilla Congress Committee (1952–1962) and was re-elected to the post (1967–1969). He later became Vice-President of the BLDEA (1972–1980), contributing to education and rural welfare. In 1962, he declined renomination to the Lok Sabha, protesting the imposition of an outsider candidate, thus ending his electoral career on a principled note.

== Bijapura District Congress Committee President (1952–1962, 1967–1969) ==
Bidari’s leadership within the Congress Party extended to the organizational level, where he served as President of the Bijapura Zilla Congress Committee for two terms. During his tenure, he played a key role in party-building, candidate selection, and maintaining ideological discipline at the grassroots. Unlike many regional leaders, he never used his party position for personal patronage. He was known for mentoring younger workers, encouraging women's participation in village panchayats, and ensuring the Congress remained connected to rural concerns.

== Vice President, BLDEA (1972–1980) ==
In the final decade of his public life, Bidari served as Vice-President of the Bijapur Lingayat District Education Association (BLDEA), one of North Karnataka’s premier educational institutions. He played a significant role in expanding BLDEA’s footprint in rural education, particularly in opening primary schools and vocational training centers for the underprivileged. His vision was to create “a self-reliant rural youth,” equipped with both technical skills and civic responsibility. Even in his eighties, he remained involved in curriculum oversight and scholarship allocation.

== Personal Life and Values ==
In 1919, Ramappa married Chinnamma, but after a decade without children, she urged him to marry her younger sister Tarabai. He did so in 1929, with the full support of both families—a practice not uncommon at the time. According to a local astrologer, Tarabai was destined to bear him a son within a year, which came true with the birth of Dr. Chandrashekara Bidari in 1930. Tarabai bore him six more children—Hanumantha, Laxmana (Thatha Saheba), and daughters Indrabai, Gangabai, Bhagirathi, and Shakuntala. The two wives lived in harmony and supported his social and political life. His household combined traditional Indian family structures with a progressive, service-oriented ethos.

== Legacy and Recognition ==
Ramappa Bidari lived a life of service rooted in truth, austerity, and Gandhian discipline. He never sought personal wealth or rewards. He: • Returned a land grant and ₹10,000 cash award received from the Aundh Maharaja • Donated a gold medal to the National Disaster Fund during the 1962 Indo-China War • Refused political favors, even declining a third term in Parliament on ethical grounds His vision of Gram Swaraj directly influenced India’s Panchayati Raj system, though his name is often absent from official histories. Scholars have described him as the "silent architect of grassroots democracy in India," and his contributions are now receiving belated attention.

== In Literature and Commemoration ==
His life is the subject of the biography Ramappa Balappa Bidari: The Unsung Champion of Gram Swaraj by Dr. Krishna Kolharkulkarni, published by Vachana Pitamaha Dr. P. G. Halakatti Research Centre, BLDEA, Vijayapura (2021). The book draws from archival documents, family accounts, and contemporary records. There have been calls to include his story in state textbooks, erect a memorial in Karnataka, and digitally archive his works and speeches.

== Death ==
Ramappa Balappa Bidari died on 31 August 1982. He was 83 years old.

== Books on Ramappa Bidari ==
Two biographies on Ramappa Bidari have been published - Prof. S. S. Baanad's Aparupada Rajakarani Ramappa Bidari and Dr. Krishna Kolharkulkarni's Ramappa Balappa Bidari - The Unsung Champion of Gram Swarajya
