= 1982 JSL Cup final =

Furukawa Electric	Yanmar Diesel
3	2
- Date: August 30, 1982
- Venue: Kusanagi Athletic Stadium, Shizuoka

1982 JSL Cup final was the seventh final of the JSL Cup competition. The final was played at Kusanagi Athletic Stadium in Shizuoka on August 30, 1982. Furukawa Electric won the championship.

== Overview ==
Furukawa Electric won their 2nd title, by defeating Yanmar Diesel 3–2.

== Match details ==
August 30, 1982

Furukawa Electric	3-2	Yanmar Diesel
? ?' ? ?' ? ?'		? ?' ? ?'

Kusanagi Athletic Stadium

== See also ==
- 1982 JSL Cup
