= UP Stock Exchange =

Kanpur-based stock exchange

Coordinates: 26.481699°N 80.344841°E

- Type: Stock Exchange
- Location: Padam Tower, VIP Road, Kanpur, Uttar Pradesh, INDIA
- Founded: 27 August 1982
- Key people: Dr. G.H.Singhania (Co-Founder) Mr. Padam Kumar Jain (Co-Founder)
- Currency: ₹
- Website: upsecindia.com

UP Stock Exchange (UPSE) was a Kanpur-based stock exchange. It occupied a prominent place among the Stock Exchanges in India. The Exchange was inaugurated on 27 August 1982 by the then Finance Minister Pranab Mukherjee. It played an important role in the development of the capital market of North India. Initially, it had only 350 members which grew up to 540.

UPSE is the only stock exchange in Uttar Pradesh and the membership is not restricted to the people of Uttar Pradesh only. Members living outside Kanpur has contributed a lot by creating the equity cult in whole of the Uttar Pradesh.

== See also ==
- List of stock exchanges in the Commonwealth of Nations
