= United Nations Security Council Resolution 879 =

UN Security Council Resolution 879
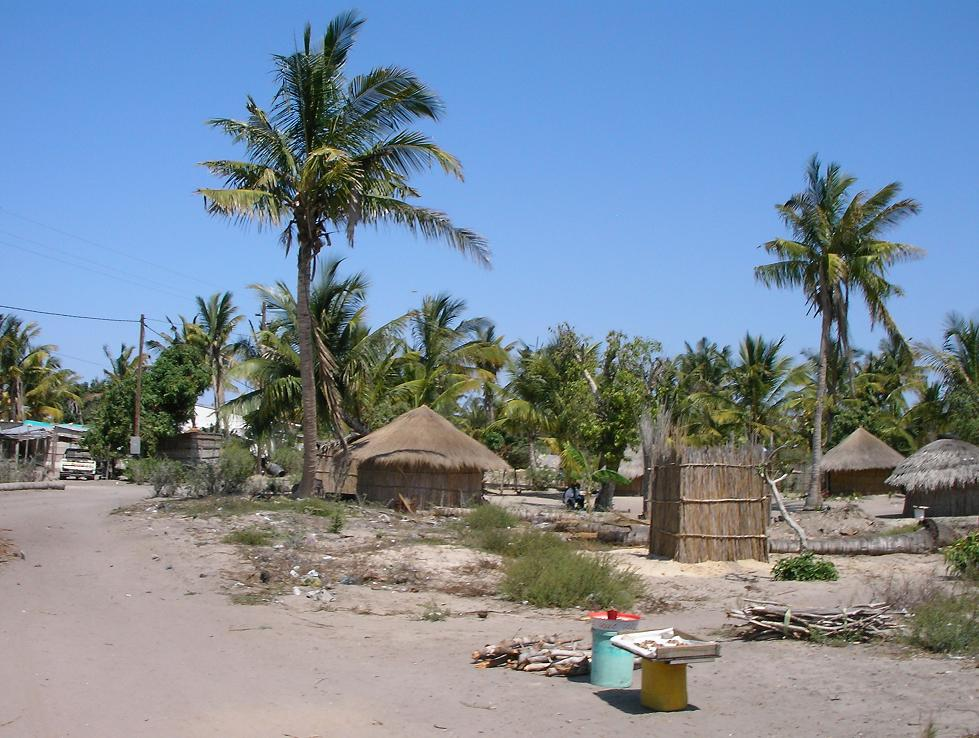
- Homes in Mozambique
- Date: 29 October 1993
- Meeting no.: 3,300
- Code: S/RES/879 (Document)
- Subject: The situation in Mozambique
- Voting summary: 15 voted for; None voted against; None abstained
- Result: Adopted

Security Council composition
- Permanent members: China; France; Russia; United Kingdom; United States
- Non-permanent members: Brazil; Cape Verde; Djibouti; Hungary; Japan; Morocco; New Zealand; Pakistan; Spain; Venezuela

United Nations Security Council resolution 879, adopted unanimously on 29 October 1993, after reaffirming resolutions 782 (1992), 797 (1992), 818 (1993), 850 (1993) and 863 (1993) on the situation in Mozambique, the Council reiterated the importance of the Rome General Peace Accords and extended the mandate of the United Nations Operation in Mozambique for an interim period ending 5 November 1993.

== See also ==
- History of Mozambique
- List of United Nations Security Council Resolutions 801 to 900 (1993–1994)
- Mozambican Civil War
