= United Nations Security Council Resolution 863 =

UN Security Council Resolution 863
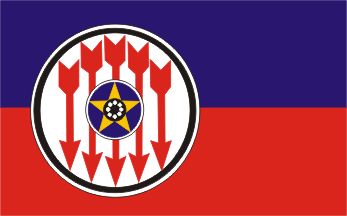
- The first flag of RENAMO
- Date: 13 September 1993
- Meeting no.: 3,274
- Code: S/RES/863 (Document)
- Subject: The situation in Mozambique
- Voting summary: 15 voted for; None voted against; None abstained
- Result: Adopted

Security Council composition
- Permanent members: China; France; Russia; United Kingdom; United States
- Non-permanent members: Brazil; Cape Verde; Djibouti; Hungary; Japan; Morocco; New Zealand; Pakistan; Spain; Venezuela

United Nations Security Council resolution 863, adopted unanimously on 13 September 1993, after reaffirming resolutions 782 (1992), 797 (1992), 818 (1993) and 850 (1993) on the situation in Mozambique, the council discussed the implementation of the Rome General Peace Accords.

The security council reiterated the importance of the General Peace Agreement for Mozambique and their timely implementation. It commended the efforts of the Secretary-General Boutros Boutros-Ghali, his special representative, the United Nations Operation in Mozambique (ONUMOZ) and the Organisation of African Unity (OAU) and welcomed the recent progress in the peace process and the specific agreement that resulted from direct talks between the President of Mozambique and of the group RENAMO. It was stressed that no conditions should be attached to the contraction and demobilisation of troops, or more time to gain concessions, and The resolution also expressed concern about the delay in implementing some important parts of the peace agreement and violations of the ceasefire.

The council stressed that the General Peace Accords had to be respected and the need for elections to be held by October 1994. It insisted that the two parties immediately agree a timetable for the implementation of the agreement, stressing also the immediate assembly and demobilisation of troops, urging RENAMO to join the Government of Mozambique in this manner. Meanwhile, the progress Commission for the new Mozambican Defence Force in relation to the training of instructors in Nyanga, Zimbabwe and demining.

RENAMO and other political parties were then called to join with the government of Mozambique in quickly agreeing on an election law which should include provisions for a national election commission, further calling on all parties to make the National Commission for Administration, the National Information Commission and the Police Affairs Commission operational. Agreements between both parties in Maputo concerning the reintegration into the state administration of all areas now under the control of RENAMO as well as on the request for monitoring of all police activities by the United Nations was praised. In this regard, the secretary-general was asked to examine the proposal to monitor police activities while his intention to send a survey team of experts regarding a proposed United Nations police contingent was welcomed.

The resolution concluded by urging both parties to ensure the momentum towards the full implementation of the Peace Accords is maintained, and the international community was urged to continue to provide humanitarian aid unimpeded by any party in Mozambique. The Secretary-General was requested to report back by 31 October 1993 on developments.

== See also ==
- History of Mozambique
- List of United Nations Security Council Resolutions 801 to 900 (1993–1994)
- Mozambican Civil War
