= List of awards and honours received by Nelson Mandela =

His Excellency Nelson Mandela OMP SBG SBS CLS DMG MMS MMB GCFR NPk OM RSerafO CC AC GCStJ OJ QC GCIH
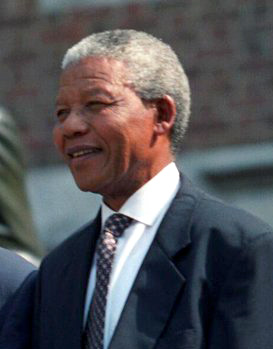
- Born: Rolihlahla Mandela; 18 July 1918; Mvezo, South Africa
- Died: 5 December 2013 (aged 95); Johannesburg, South Africa
- Resting place: Qunu, Eastern Cape; 31°48′17.15″S 28°36′48.7″E
- Known for: Anti-apartheid activism
- Notable work: Long Walk to Freedom
- Political party: African National Congress
- Website: nelsonmandela.org

This is a comprehensive list of awards, honours and other recognitions bestowed on Nelson Mandela. Mandela received more than 260 awards over 40 years, most notably the Nobel Peace Prize in 1993.

From 1994 to 1999, Mandela was President of South Africa. He was the first such African to be elected in fully representative democratic polls.

Before his presidency, Mandela was an anti-apartheid activist and leader of the African National Congress and its armed wing Umkhonto we Sizwe. He spent 27 years in prison, much of it in a cell on Robben Island. The rest of his incarceration was in Pollsmoor Prison, on convictions for crimes that included sabotage committed while he spearheaded the struggle against apartheid.

Following his release from prison on 11 February 1990, his advocacy of a policy of reconciliation and negotiation helped lead the transition to multi-racial democracy in South Africa. Since the end of apartheid, he was widely praised, even by former opponents.

Mandela died on 5 December 2013 as a celebrated elder statesman who continued to voice his opinion on topical issues. In South Africa he is often known as Madiba, an aristocratic title adopted by the elderly members of the royal clan that he belonged to. This title has come to be synonymous with Nelson Mandela.

== 1960s ==
- 1964 – Elected Honorary President of the Students' Union, University of Leeds

== 1970s ==
- 1973 – A nuclear particle discovered by scientists at the University of Leeds is named the "Mandela particle".
- 1975 – Honorary life membership of the Students' Union, University of London
- 1979 – Awarded Honorary Doctorate of Law, University of Lesotho, Maseru, 29 September
- 1979 – Jawaharlal Nehru Award for International Understanding, by the Indian Council for Cultural Relations New Delhi, India

== 1981 ==
- August – Freedom of the City of Glasgow
- The first UK road named in his honour – "Mandela Close" – is unveiled in the London Borough of Brent
- Bruno Kreisky Award for merit in the field of human rights, chosen by a panel of international judges, Vienna, Austria

== 1983 ==
- Honorary citizenship of Rome, February
- Honorary citizenship of Olympia, Greece, 17 March
- Honorary Doctorate of Laws, City College of New York, 22 March
- Ornamental gardens in Hull, United Kingdom, named "Nelson Mandela Gardens", May
- City Council of Dublin, Ireland, unveiled sculpture in Merrion Square by Elisabeth Frink dedicated to Nelson Mandela, 26 June
- Award of the order Star of International Friendship in gold by the German Democratic Republic, 18 July
- City Council of Harlow, United Kingdom, renamed one of its major roads in honour of Nelson Mandela, 18 July
- AUEW/TASS, one of United Kingdom's major trade unions, renamed their executive committee room the "Nelson Mandela Room", 18 July
- Freedom of London Borough of Greenwich, 20 July
- UNESCO awards its first Simon Bolivar International Prize jointly to Nelson Mandela and King Juan Carlos of Spain at a ceremony in Caracas, Venezuela, on the 200th anniversary of the birth of Simón Bolívar, 24 July
- City Council of Leeds, United Kingdom, names the Civic Hall "Nelson Mandela Gardens", 10 December
- Honorary Doctorate of Laws, Lancaster University, United Kingdom
- The Students Unions of Warwick University, Coventry Polytechnic (now Coventry University) and South Bank Polytechnic (now London South Bank University) named rooms in honour of Nelson Mandela
- New York City renamed square in front of South African mission to the United Nations 'Nelson and Winnie Mandela Plaza'

== 1984 ==
- Honorary Degree, Free University of Brussels, 13 January
- London Borough of Camden Council, names the street where the Anti-Apartheid Movement has its headquarters as "Mandela Street".
- London Borough of Hackney Council, renames a housing block after Nelson Mandela, April
- Order of Playa Girón, Cuba, awarded by Fidel Castro
- Honorary membership of National Association of Local Government Officers [NALGO] United Kingdom
- London Borough of Haringey Council, names housing development after Nelson Mandela
- Monument to Nelson Mandela unveiled in Merrion Square, Dublin
- Elected Honorary Member of the Students Association, University of Strathclyde, Scotland
- Freedom of the City of Wijnegem, Belgium
- Awarded Star of International Friendship, German Democratic Republic, 27 August
- Freedom of the City of Aberdeen conferred on both Nelson and Winnie Mandela, 29 November
- School in German Democratic Republic named 'Nelson Mandela School'
- Room at Edinburgh city chambers named in his honour

== 1985 ==
- Revenue Staff Federation, United Kingdom, names its Commonwealth trade union scholarship after Nelson Mandela
- London Borough of Southwark names new road 'Mandela Way'
- Nottingham City Council names a room in a sports centre
- The Third World Prize, awarded annually by the London-based Third World Foundation for Social and Economic Studies, awarded jointly to Nelson and Winnie Mandela
- Awarded freedom of the City of Hull, United Kingdom.
- Awarded Degree of Doctor of Laws by the University of Strathclyde, Glasgow, 3 July 1985
- Freeman of Midlothian, Scotland (accepted during his October 1993 visit)
- Awarded the Ludovic-Trarieux International Human Rights Prize by Human Rights Institute of The Bar of Bordeaux, Bordeaux, France, 29 March
- Nigerian writers organisation, Writers and Journalists Against Apartheid (WAJAAP), confers title of Life Patron
- Town of Huddersfield in West Yorkshire, United Kingdom, renames its speakers' corner Nelson Mandela Corner, September
- Freedom of the City of Rio de Janeiro, Brazil, October
- Honorary citizenship of the State of Rio de Janeiro, Brazil, October
- Diploma of Honour and Friendship from the University of Rio de Janeiro, Brazil, October
- Statue of Nelson Mandela erected in London by Greater London Council, unveiled by Oliver Tambo on 28 October
- Senegal's President Abdou Diouf inaugurates Soweto Square and Nelson Mandela Avenue in the centre of Dakar, Senegal, 6 December
- Awarded Doctor of Laws degree by Ahmadu Bello University in Nigeria, December

== 1986 ==
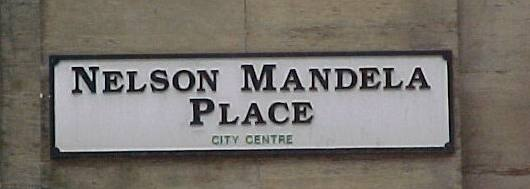
Street sign in Glasgow, Scotland

- Elected Honorary Life President of the National Union of Mineworkers of South Africa
- Awarded the W.E.B. DuBois International Medal by the National Association for the Advancement of Colored People (NAACP)
- Coventry City Council named new building after Mandela
- Presented with the Alfonso Comin Foundation Peace Award in Barcelona, Spain
- Freedom of the Borough of Islwyn, Wales, given to Winnie and Nelson Mandela
- International Peace and Freedom Award by the Workers International Centre, Stockholm Sweden
- Honorary Doctor of Literature, University of Calcutta
- Awarded, with Winnie Mandela, the Third World Prize by the Strategic and International Studies Group of Malaysia, 5 May
- Honorary Doctorate of Laws, University of Zimbabwe
- Nelson Mandela Park in Leicester, England, named after Mandela
- Honorary membership awarded to Winnie and Nelson Mandela by the National Union of Seamen, United Kingdom
- St George's Place in Glasgow, Scotland, the location of the South African consulate is renamed Nelson Mandela Place.
- Awarded the Cross of St. Andrew by Scotland.
- Made Honorary Freeman of Newcastle

== 1987 ==
- First person to receive the Freedom of the City of Sydney, Australia, 9 January.
- Honorary Degrees, Winnie and Nelson Mandela, United States Ross University School of Medicine in the Caribbean
- Named Patron of Isipingo and District Football Association, Natal
- Honorary Degree, University of Michigan, US
- Honorary Degree. University of Havana, Cuba
- Honorary Citizen, City of Florence, Italy
- Honorary Doctor of Laws, Trent University, Canada
- Honorary Doctorate, Karl Marx University of the German Democratic Republic, Leipzig, 11 November
- Archivio Disarmo Golden Doves for Peace International Award, IRIAD
- Dutch football player Ruud Gullit dedicates his European Footballer of the Year award to Nelson Mandela

== 1988 ==
- Park in Montreal named "Parc Winnie-et-Nelson-Mandela" (Winnie's name removed in 1998)
- Awarded Bremen Solidarity Prize, Federal Republic of Germany
- Nelson and Winnie Mandela given honorary membership of the National Union of Teachers, United Kingdom
- Awarded freedom of the City of Dublin, Ireland
- Awarded the Sakharov Prize for Freedom of Thought, by the European Parliament
- Honorary Doctorate conferred, University of Carabobo, Venezuela, June
- Awarded honorary degree from Western Michigan University from then-president Diether Haenicke, June
- People of Lefkada, Greece, award the Medal of Peace, August
- Honorary citizenship conferred by nine Greek municipalities Egaleo, Ellenikon, Glyfada, Ilioupolis, Daissariani, New Filadelfia, Nikaea, Preveza and Zogrofu
- Honorary degree in Political Science awarded by the University of Bologna, Italy, 12 September
- Honorary citizenship bestowed by the Town Council of the city of Bologna, Italy, September
- Awarded the United Nations Human Rights Fourth Award, 10 December
- Bachelor of Laws degree, University of South Africa

== 1989 ==
- Augusto César Sandino Award bestowed by Daniel Ortega, President of Nicaragua, Managua, 21 February
- Freedom of the Municipality of Kwekwe, Zimbabwe. Award received on his behalf by Oliver Tambo
- Awarded Peace Prize of the Tipperary Peace Committee, Ireland
- Nuremberg Platz renamed "Nelson Mandela Platz", Nuremberg, Germany, June
- Honorary Doctorate of Laws, York University, Toronto, Ontario, Canada, 16 June
- Square in Clayes-sous-Bois, France, named "Nelson Mandela Square", September

== 1990 ==
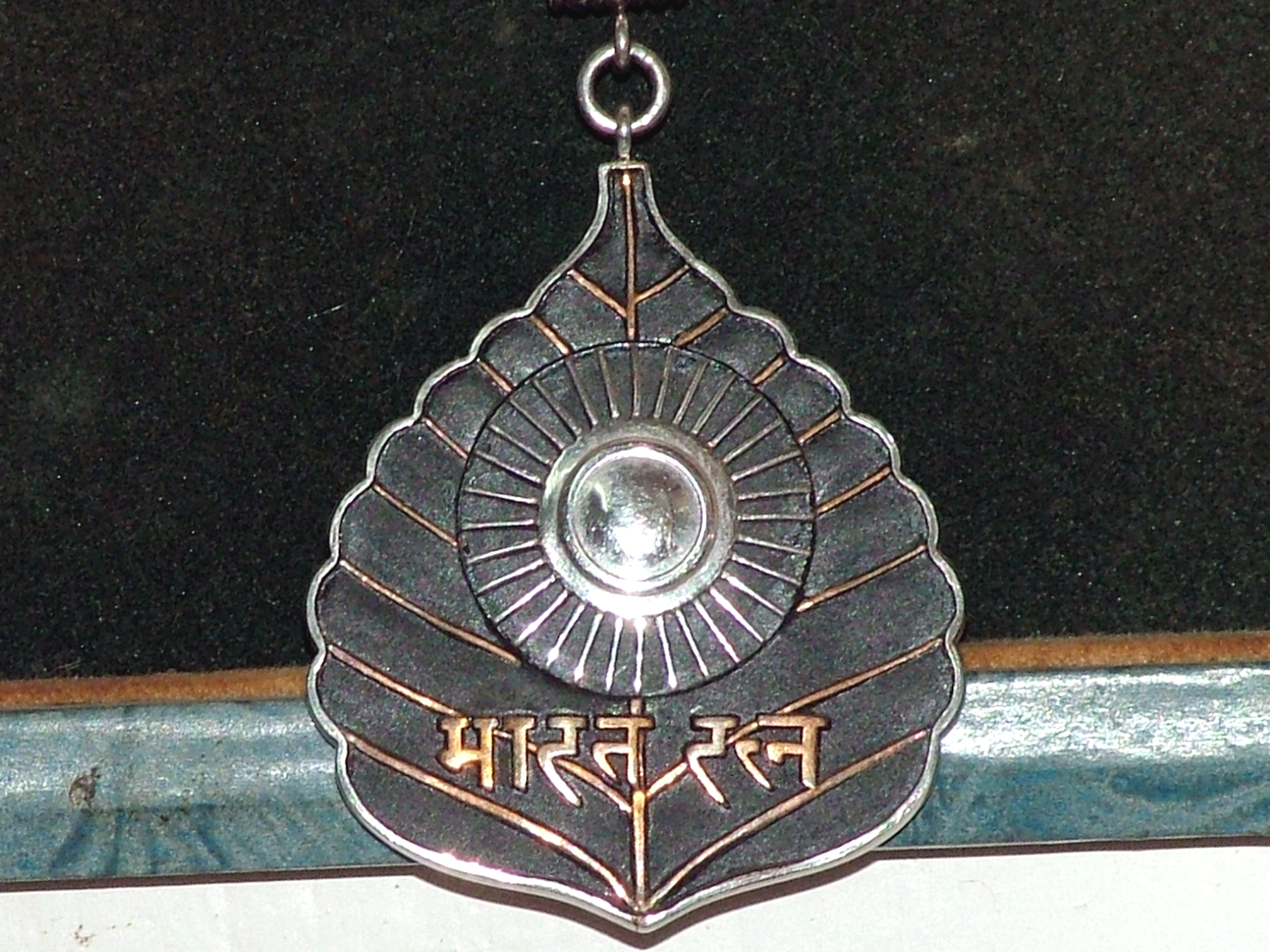
Bharat Ratna, awarded 1990

- Made Honorary Life President of National Union of Mineworkers when he addressed its Central Committee, 21 April
- Granted freedom of the City of Harare, Zimbabwe, March
- "Mandela Day", a public holiday declared in Zimbabwe on 5 March
- Awarded the Lenin Peace Prize for 1990, May. The last-ever recipient.
- Bestowed the Dr António Agostinho Neto Order, the highest honour of the People's Republic of Angola, 12 May
- Bestowed the award "Grand Commander of the Federal Republic of Nigeria", Lagos, 14 May
- Awarded the Al-Gaddafi International Prize for Human Rights in Tripoli, Libya, 19 or 20 May
- Honorary degree in political science by the Cairo University, Egypt, May
- Bestowed Bharat Ratna, India's highest civilian award, October
- Doctorate, honoris causa, conferred by University of Malaya, November
- Honorary Doctorate in law, University of the Western Cape, Bellville, Cape Town, 28 November
- Honorary Doctor of Laws, University of Cape Town

== 1991 ==
- Honorary LL.D Degree conferred, University of the Witwatersrand, Johannesburg, 6 September
- Awarded Carter-Menil Human Rights Prize, 8 December
- Awarded Félix Houphouët-Boigny Peace Prize by UNESCO
- Honorary Doctorate of Humane Letters from Texas Southern University in 1991.
- Honorary Doctor of Laws, The University of the West Indies, Jamaica, July

== 1992 ==
- Installed as Chancellor of the University of the North (now called University of Limpopo), 25 April
- Honorary LL.D Degree conferred by the University of Fort Hare, 9 May
- Honorary Doctorate conferred at the Cheikh Anta Diop University of Dakar, Senegal, 30 June
- Presented with the Freedom of Miami Beach Medallion of Honour, Johannesburg, 29 September
- Pakistan conferred the Nishan-e-Pakistan, 3 October
- Prince of Asturias Award for International Cooperation, Oviedo, Spain, 31 October
- Received the "Spirit of Liberty" award at the "People for the American Way" award ceremony, 8 November
- Received the Isitwalandwe Medal from the ANC.
- Awarded the Atatürk International Peace Prize by Turkey, but refused the award citing human rights violations committed by Turkey during that time. Mandela later accepted the award in 1999.

== 1993 ==
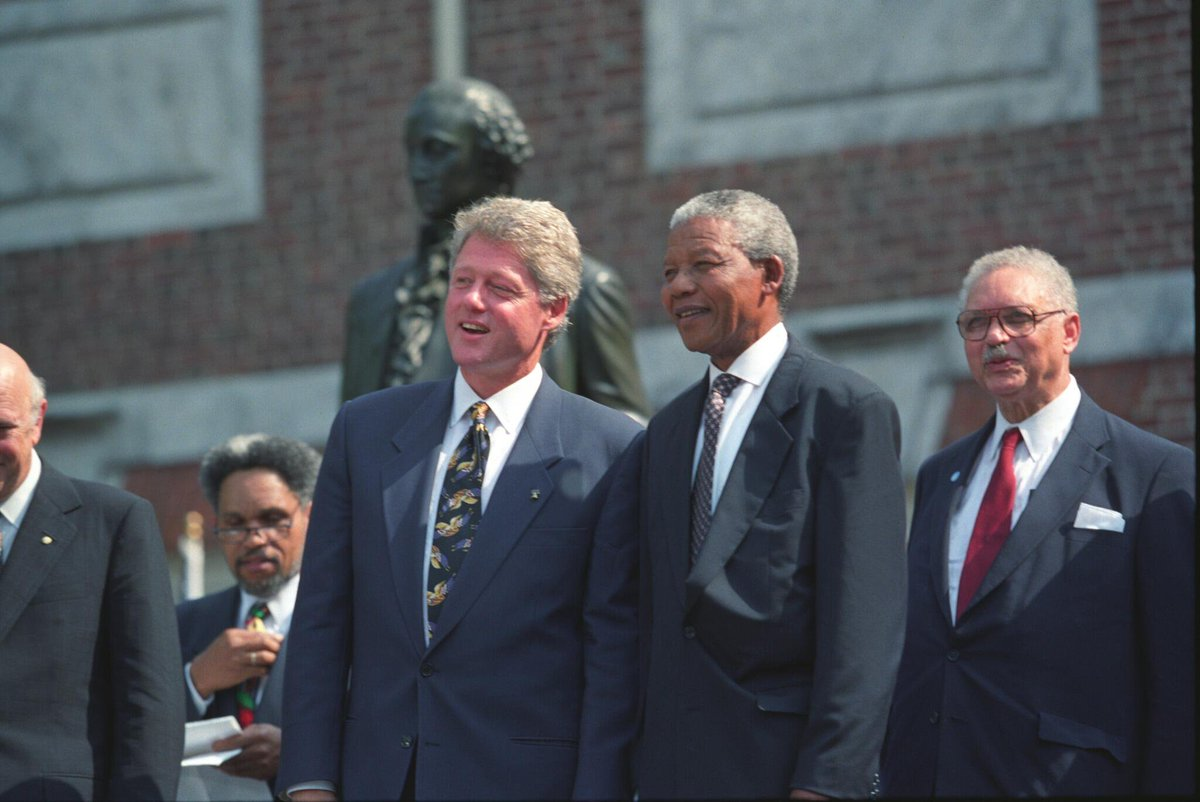
Bill Clinton presented Mandela with the Philadelphia Liberty Medal on 4 July 1993

- Received Gleitsman Foundation International Activist Award, Johannesburg, 12 May
- Received Philadelphia Liberty Medal. Presented by President of the United States Bill Clinton, Philadelphia, US, 4 July
- Honorary Degree conferred, Clark Atlanta University, 10 July
- Received Order of Brilliant Star with Special Grand Cordon, Taipei, Taiwan, 31 July
- Honorary Doctorate of Laws, Soochow University, Taiwan, 1 August
- Received Apostolic Humanitarian Award, Johannesburg, 15 September
- Awarded J. William Fulbright Prize for International Understanding, Washington, D.C., 1 October
- Received Honorary Degree from the Free University of Brussels, Belgium, 8 October
- Awarded Nobel Peace Prize Oslo, Norway, 10 December
- Named Person of the Year by Time magazine, together with F. W. de Klerk, Yasser Arafat and Yitzhak Rabin.

== 1994 ==
- Received the New Nation/Engen Man of the Year Flame of Distinction award, 24 March
- Received the Grand Cross of the Order of the Republic of Tunisia, 13 June
- Elected Newsmaker of the Year, with Deputy President F W de Klerk, by the Johannesburg Press Club, 25 May. Prof Kader Asmal received the award on 29 September
- Received the Hunger Project's 8th annual Africa Prize for Leadership for the Sustainable End of Hunger, London, 19 July
- Received Anne Frank medal for human rights and tolerance, Johannesburg, 15 August
- Received Sheikh Yusuf Peace Award from the Muslim Women's Federation, 10 September
- Received the Arthur A Houghton Star Crystal Award for Excellence from the African-American Institute, 6 October
- Received Bishop John T. Walker Distinguished Humanitarian Service Award from Africare, 6 October
- Honorary Doctorate, Howard University, 7 October
- Received freedom of the town of Tongaat, KwaZulu-Natal, 21 October (initially granted in 1989)
- Received the Olympic Gold Order from International Olympic Committee president, Juan Antonio Samaranch, Cape Town, 16 November
- Received Man of the Year Award from the Greek Chamber of Commerce and Industries of Southern Africa, Johannesburg, 19 November 1994
- Received the Grand'Croix degree of the National Order of the Legion of Honour of France, Paris, 28 December
- Honorary Doctorate awarded by University of South Africa
- Awarded the "Commonwealth Champion of Health" medal, received by South African athletes at the Commonwealth Games, Canada

== 1995 ==
- Africa Peace Award – sponsored jointly by the African Centre for the Constructive Resolution of Disputes (ACCORD) and the Organisation of African Unity (OAU) – presented at a ceremony in Durban, March
- Appointed an honorary member of the Order of Merit by Queen Elizabeth II
- "Nelson Mandela Road" to Katse, Lesotho, inaugurated, 13 July
- Received Pretoria Press Club's 1994 Newsmaker of the Year Award, Pretoria, 20 July
- Granted the Freedom of Uitenhage, 14 September
- Awarded Honorary Fellowship of the College of Medicine of South Africa, Johannesburg, 17 October
- Harvard Business School Statesman of the Year Award, 14 December
- Human Rights Institute, with President Mandela as honorary chairman, launched in London by the International Bar Association, December 1995
- The Wolf Award, presented in South Africa by Canadian aboriginal leaders Phil Fontaine and George Muswagon

== 1996 ==
- Awarded honorary fellowship of the Royal College of Surgeons in Ireland, Dublin, Ireland
- Indira Gandhi Award for International Justice and Harmony bestowed. Award received by Justice Minister Dullah Omar in New Delhi, India, January
- Received the World Citizenship Award of the World Association of Girl Guides and Girl Scouts
- U Thant Peace Award bestowed by Sri Chinmoy, 29 January
- Created Knight of the Order of the Elephant by the Danish Queen Margrethe II, Copenhagen, 18 February. By tradition of the order, the Knight's coat of arms is drawn on a plate and it is hung in the chapel of Frederiksborg Castle. If one hasn't a coat of arms (as was the case for Mandela), the Court heraldist composes one, with the Knight's cooperation. Mandela eventually chose the South African flag as his coat of arms to be used for this and other foreign orders. The elephant insignia that he received had previously been worn by Emperor Haile Selassie of Ethiopia.
- Awarded the National Order of Mali (Grande Croix), Mali's highest decoration, Bamako, 3 March
- Received the Honorary Freedom of the City of London, London, 10 July
- Received the Degree of Doctor of Civil Law by Diploma of the University of Oxford and honorary degrees from the Universities of Cambridge (LLD), London (London School of Economics), Bristol, Nottingham, and Warwick (LLD) and from De Montfort and Glasgow Caledonian Universities in the garden of Buckingham Palace, 10 July A photograph of the event is available on the Glasgow Caledonian University Archives website
- Received Honorary Doctorate from Pantheon-Sorbonne University, Paris, 15 July
- Received Honorary Doctorate from Stellenbosch University, 25 October
- Received the Freedom of Heidelberg, Heidelberg, 29 November
- Awarded The Battle of Adwa and the Victory of Adwa Centenary Medal by the Crown Council of Ethiopia in 1996

== 1997 ==
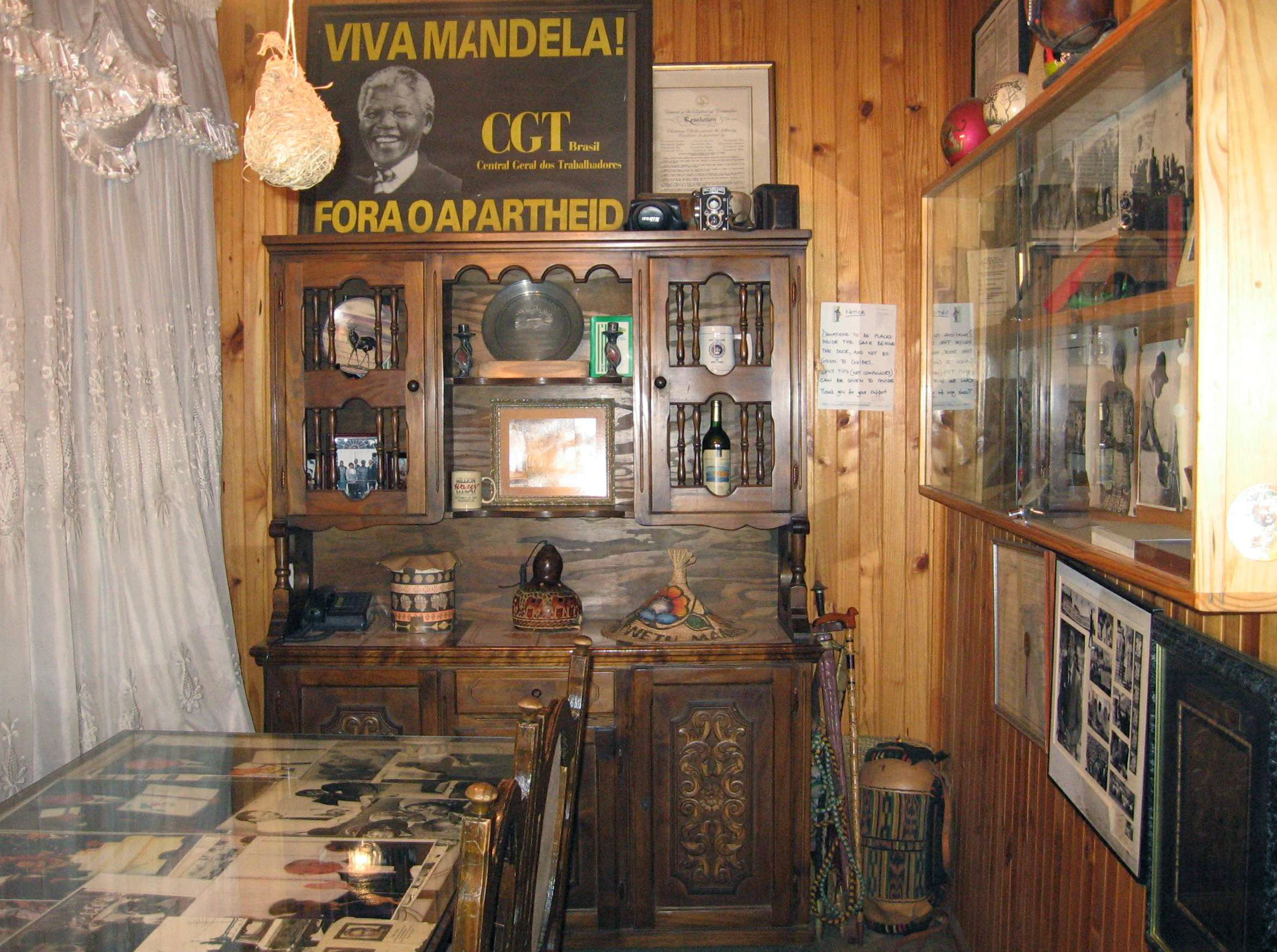
- Nelson Mandela's former house in Soweto, Johannesburg, now Mandela Family Museum.
- Mandela Family Museum opens in Soweto, 29 November
- Awarded Honorary Degree by the University of the Philippines Diliman, Quezon City, 2 March
- Created Knight of the Royal Order of the Seraphim, Stockholm, 3 February. By tradition of the order, the Knight's coat of arms is drawn on a plate and it is kept in the Hall of the Order of the Seraphim at the Royal Palace of Stockholm. If one hasn't a coat of arms, the Court heraldist composes one, with the Knight's cooperation. In this case, the Danish coat of arms was used as a starting point. By tradition, on the day of his funeral (15 December 2013), it was hung in Riddarholmen Church and the church bells rang constantly from 12:00 to 13:00 as a tribute.
- Received Freedom of the City of Pietermaritzburg, 25 April
- Received Freedom of the City of Bloemfontein, 16 May
- Baker Avenue in Central Harare, Zimbabwe, Renamed Nelson Mandela Avenue, 19 May
- Received Freedom of Boksburg, 26 June
- Received Freedom of Oxford, United Kingdom, 11 July
- Awarded Honorary Doctorate from Chulalongkorn University, Bangkok, Thailand, 17 July
- Awarded Honorary Doctorate by Ben-Gurion University of the Negev, Cape Town, 19 September
- Received the American Public Health Association Presidential Citation, Pretoria, 14 October
- Awarded the Collar of the Nile by President Hosni Mubarak of Egypt, Cairo, 21 October
- Received Freedom of City of Edinburgh, Scotland, 27 October
- Received Freedom of City of Cape Town, 27 November
- Received Honorary Degree from the University of Pretoria, Pretoria, 4 December
- Multi-purpose room at Binghamton University renamed Nelson Mandela's Room
- The National Stadium in Kampala, Uganda is named Mandela National Stadium, opened in 1997 with a concert by Lucky Dube.

== 1998 ==
- Received Honorary Doctoral Degree from the University of South Australia, University of Fort Hare, 23 April
- Awarded Honorary Doctorate, University of Zululand, 30 May
- Awarded the Freedom of the City and County of Cardiff, Cardiff, 16 June
- Awarded the Chris Hani Award at the 10th National Congress of the South African Communist Party, Johannesburg, 1 July
- Awarded Honorary Degree by the University of Mauritius, 11 September
- Park in Montreal named again "Parc Nelson-Mandela", 14 September
- Awarded Honorary Doctorate by Harvard University, Cambridge, Massachusetts, 18 September
- Awarded the Congressional Gold Medal, the joint-highest civilian award in the United States, presented by President Bill Clinton on behalf of the United States Congress, Washington, D.C., US, 23 September 1998.
- Appointed Honorary Companion of the Order of Canada by the Governor General of Canada on behalf of the Queen of Canada, 24 September.
- Nelson Mandela public school named in his honour in Toronto.
- Presented with Award in Recognition of his Contribution to Democracy, Human Rights and Freedom by the Supreme Council of Sport in Africa, 19 November
- Created a Knight Grand Cross of the Royal Norwegian Order of St Olav by the King of Norway.

== 1999 ==
- Received the Deutscher Medienpreis, Baden-Baden, Germany, 28 January
- Awarded the Oneness-Peace Earth-Summit-Transcendence-Fragrance Award, Pretoria, 9 March
- Received the Golden Medal of the City of Amsterdam, Netherlands, 10 March
- Received honorary doctorate from Leiden University, Netherlands, 12 March
- Awarded the Freedom of the City of Durban, Durban, 16 April
- Received Honorary Doctorate from the Russian Academy of Sciences, Moscow, 30 April
- Received Ukraine's Highest Decoration, the First Class of the Order of Prince Yaroslav the Wise, Cape Town, 5 May
- Received Jesse Owens Global Award, Johannesburg, 21 September
- Received insignia of Honour from the African Renaissance Institute, Johannesburg, 11 October
- Received an Honorary Doctorate of Laws from the University of Botswana, Gaborone, 14 October
- Received the Baker Institute Enron Prize for Distinguished Public Service at Rice University, Houston, 26 October
- Awarded the Freedom of the City of Lydenburg, Lydenburg, 3 November
- Appointed Honorary Companion of the Order of Australia, Canberra, 9 June; presented with the insignia by Australian Prime Minister John Howard in Pretoria on 15 November.
- Was among 18 included in Gallup's List of Widely Admired People of the 20th Century, from a poll conducted of the American people in December 1999.
- Presented with Temple of Understanding Annual Award to Religious and Political Leaders for Outstanding Service to Humanity, Cape Town, 5 December
- Presented with the Gandhi-King Award by the World Movement for Nonviolence at the World Parliament of Religions, Cape Town, 5 December
- Listed as one of the 100 most influential people of the 20th century by Time magazine
- Created Knight of the Dutch/Luxembourgian Order of the Gold Lion of the House of Nassau, Netherlands, 10 March
- Created a Knight of the Collar of the Spanish Order of Isabella the Catholic by King Juan Carlos in 1999. Members of the order at the rank of knight and above enjoy personal nobility and have the privilege of adding a golden heraldic mantle to their coats of arms. Those at the rank of the Collar also receive the official style of "His or Her Most Excellent Lord".
- Created Knight Grand Cross of the Royal Order of the Crown of Rwanda by King Kigeli V in 1999 (personal nobility, the official style "His Excellency").

== 2000 ==
- 5th recipient of the Zik Prize in honour of Nnamdi Azikiwe
- Honorary Juris Doctor degree from the Faculty of Law at Uppsala University, Sweden, 22 January
- The Nelson Mandela National Museum is officially opened in Soweto, 11 February
- Awarded honorary Doctorate of Laws by Trinity College Dublin, 11 April
- Appointed honorary Queen's Counsel by Queen Elizabeth II, 3 May
- Awarded SABS Gold Medal, Sandton, 10 June
- BT Ethnic Multicultural Media Award, London
- Received World Methodist Peace Award, London, 29 June
- International Freedom Award, Memphis, Tennessee, 22 November
- Elected an Honorary Member of the Bertrand Russell Society,
- Awarded Honorary Doctorate of Law from the University of Technology, Sydney, Australia
- Awarded Honorary Doctor of Letters from the Australian National University, 6 September
- Awarded the Benjamin Franklin Medal for Distinguished Public Service by the American Philosophical Society
- Honorary Doctor Honoris Causa from the University of São Paulo.

== 2001 ==
- International Gandhi Peace Prize, Presidential Palace, New Delhi, 16 March
- Made an Honorary Freeman of Leeds, 30 April
- Made an Honorary Fellow of Magdalene College, Cambridge, 2 May
- Awarded the first King Shaka Award in recognition of bravery, 25 July 2001
- Park Public School renamed Mandela Park Public School, Toronto, Ontario, Canada, 17 November
- Received honorary doctorate of law from Ryerson University, Toronto, Ontario, Canada, 17 November
- Granted Honorary Citizenship of Canada, 19 November
- Awarded the LLD Honoris Cause from the University of the Free State
- Awarded the D Tech Education Honoris Cause from the Technikon Free State
- Human Rights Lifetime Achievement award by the SA Human Rights Commission, Johannesburg, 11 December
- Made an Honorary Administrator For A Day at Binghamton University

== 2002 ==
- Awarded an honorary doctorate in law from the University of Hong Kong, Hong Kong, Hong Kong, 21 March
- Awarded an honorary doctorate in law from Rhodes University, Grahamstown, South Africa, 6 April
- New hall of residence at Rhodes University, Grahamstown, South Africa named 'Nelson Mandela Hall'
- Awarded an honorary doctorate by the University of Ghana, 24 April
- Awarded the Franklin Delano Roosevelt Freedom Medal, Middelburg, The Netherlands, 8 June.
- Awarded the Presidential Medal of Freedom, the United States' joint-highest civilian award, by George W. Bush, Washington, US, 9 July
- Awarded the Queen Elizabeth II Golden Jubilee Medal from Canada.
- Awarded the Order of Mapungubwe – Platinum Category by President Thabo Mbeki, Union Buildings, Pretoria, December 2002.
- Construction begins on Mandela Parkway in Oakland, California, replacing the Cypress Street Viaduct portion of the Nimitz Freeway that was demolished by 1989's Loma Prieta earthquake.

== 2003 ==
- Awarded an honorary doctorate in law by the National University of Ireland, Galway, 20 June
- Elected an Honorary Life member of the Literary and Debating Society, NUI, Galway.
- Named a Hero of Freedom by the libertarian magazine Reason
- Awarded Honorary Doctorate Degree – Doctor of Letters (Honoris causa) by The Open University of Tanzania
- British Red Cross Humanity Medal

== 2004 ==
Order of St John of Jerusalem Badge

- Sandton Square in Johannesburg, South Africa is renamed Nelson Mandela Square on 31 March with the unveiling of a 6-metre bronze statue.
- Listed as one of the 100 most influential people of 2004 by Time magazine
- Appointed Bailiff Grand Cross of the Most Venerable Order of St John of Jerusalem
- Africa Elephant Award by the Africa Scout Region
- Zoologists Brent E. Hendrixson and Jason E. Bond named a South African species of trapdoor spider in the family Ctenizidae as Stasimopus mandelai, "honouring Nelson Mandela, the former president of South Africa and one of the great moral leaders of our time."
- Presented with the Honorary Degree of Doctor of Laws from Open University. The award was presented to him at his home in Cape Town by Professor Brenda Gourley The Open University's Vice-Chancellor (2002–2008) and former Vice-Chancellor of the University of Natal.

== 2005 ==
- Amherst College honorary degree.
- Listed as one of the 100 most influential people of 2005 by Time magazine

== 2006 ==
- New Statesman – Listed as the number 2 in the 50 "Heroes of our time".
- Awarded Amnesty International's Ambassador of Conscience Award
- Made an honorary member of Manchester United as the club toured South Africa in the winter of 2006
- Conferred an honorary doctorate in government and politics by Universiti Teknologi Mara, the biggest public university in Malaysia, in recognition of his tireless efforts and triumph in struggling for the people's rights in his country and strengthening their socio-economy.
- Awarded the Giuseppe Motta Medal for support for peace and democracy.
- 6 July 2006 Included in "Names on the Wall" monument to freedom fighters at Oriel Chambers, the home of the Wilberforce Institute for the study of Slavery and Emancipation, University of Hull, Hull, UK
- South African Red Cross Society Humanitarian Award
- Conferred an honorary Doctorate of Humane Letters from the University of Massachusetts
- Awarded The Ahimsa Award by the Institute of Jainology, for his Gandhian principles of non-violence in Independence, UK

== 2007 ==
- The Westminster City Council agreed to erect a statue of Mandela opposite the Houses of Parliament in London.
- Honorary citizen of Belgrade, Serbia. "for his huge humanitarian past and contributions to mankind".
- Received the Order of the Smile, Poland, 26 October.

== 2008 ==
- Michigan State University LLD honoris causa.
- Order of Stara Planina First Class, awarded by Bulgaria (12 June 2008)
- Received an honorary doctorate from Queen's University Belfast on 1 July 2008
- Received the Freedom of the City of Tshwane on 13 May 2008.

== 2009 ==
- In July 2009, Mandela received the Arthur Ashe Courage Award, presented by Venus Williams and Serena Williams. Accepting on his behalf were his daughter and grandson.
- In November 2009, the United Nations General Assembly announced that Mandela's birthday, 18 July, is to be known as "Mandela Day" marking his contribution to world freedom.

== 2010 ==
- Received Honorary Degree from Queen's University at Kingston in Ontario, Canada on 28 October.
- Conferred an Honorary Doctorate Degree by six universities in the Laureate International Universities network.
- Conferred an Honorary Doctor of Laws Degree by Brown University in Providence, Rhode Island, United States.
- Received Orden del Águila Azteca. Presented by President of México Felipe Calderón, Johannesburg, South Africa, 11 June 2010.

== 2012 ==
- Received the Canadian version of the Queen Elizabeth II Diamond Jubilee Medal
- Received the Robben Island Alumnus Award in recognition of being a UNISA Robben Island Alumnus who has sacrificed so much for the liberation of South Africa.

== 2013 ==
- On 10 December 2013, the amphitheatre of the Union Buildings in Pretoria was renamed the Nelson Mandela Amphitheatre.
- On 16 December 2013, a 9-metre-high (30 ft) bronze statue of Mandela was unveiled at the Union Buildings in Pretoria.

== 2014 ==
- A plaque was dedicated in Monument Park at Yankee Stadium to commemorate his 1990 visit.

== 2015 ==
- Nelson Mandela was posthumously inducted into the World Rugby Hall of Fame.

== 2016 ==
- A quote of Mandela's from 1991, "I cherish my own freedom dearly, but I care even more for your freedom," is on a wall of the Contemplative Court, a space for reflection in the Smithsonian's National Museum of African American History and Culture; the museum opened in 2016.
- In 2016, a large Bronze statue of Mandela was unveiled in a square in Ramallah in the Israeli-occupied West Bank to honor his support to the Palestinians, where huge posters were installed with Mandela's statement: "We know too well that our freedom is incomplete without the freedom of the Palestinians."

== 2018 ==
On 24 September 2018, Heads of State and Government and representatives of States and Governments, met at United Nations Headquarters in New York, at the "Nelson Mandela Peace Summit" to reflect on global peace, in honour of the centenary of the birth of Nelson Mandela and to collectively hold themselves accountable to the values and principles of the declaration drafted and agreed upon at the summit, to strive for a just, peaceful, prosperous, democratic, fair, equitable and inclusive world. The world leaders called upon their people to celebrate the richness of our diversity and the collective creativity and wisdom of our elders, and the well-being and survival of Mother Earth, and called upon their youth, artists, sports personalities, musicians and poets to breathe new life into the values and principles of the United Nations and recognize the period from 2019 to 2028 as the Nelson Mandela Decade of Peace.

== 2019 to 2028 ==
The UN Nelson Mandela Decade of Peace, an intergovernmental honour.

== Summary of orders received ==
Order	Country / Org	Year
Star of People's Friendship	East Germany	1984
Medal of the Order of Playa Girón	Cuba	1984
Medal of the Order of Eduardo Mondlane	Mozambique	1988
Grand Cross of the Order of Manuel Amador Guerrero	Panama	1988
Grand Cross of the Order Augusto César Sandino	Nicaragua	1989
Recipient of the Bharat Ratna	India	1990
Star of the Republic of Indonesia, 1st Class	Indonesia	1990
Grand Commander of the Order of the Federal Republic	Nigeria	1990
Order of the Uhuru Torch (Second Class)	Tanzania	1990
Medal of the Order of Agostinho Neto	Angola	1990
Grand Officer of the Order of Rio Branco	Brazil	1991
Medal of the Order of José Martí	Cuba	1991
Grand Cross of the Order of Liberty	Portugal	1991
Collar of Nishan-e-Pakistan	Pakistan	1992
Order of Brilliant Star with Special Grand Cordon	Taiwan	1993
Order of Francisco de Miranda First Class	Venezuela	1993
Grand Cross of the National Order of the Legion of Honour	France	1994
Grand Cross of the Order of the Republic	Tunisia	1994
Collar of the Order of the Liberator General San Martín	Argentina	1995
Honorary Member of the Order of Merit	Commonwealth of Nations	1995
Grand Cordon of the Supreme Order of the Chrysanthemum	Japan	1995
Knight Commander of the Most Courteous Order of Lesotho	Lesotho	1995
Grand Collar of the Order of Prince Henry	Portugal	1995
Recipient of the Grand Order of Mugunghwa	South Korea	1995
Collar of the Order of Zayed	United Arab Emirates	1995
Presidential Order of Botswana	Botswana	1996
Grand Collar of the Order of the Southern Cross	Brazil	1996
Knight of the Order of the Elephant	Denmark	1996
Grand Cross Special Class of the Order of Merit of the Federal Republic of Germany	Germany	1996
Grand Cross of the National Order of Mali	Mali	1996
Knight Grand Cross of the Order of the Netherlands Lion	Netherlands	1996
Grand Cross of the National Order of the Lion	Senegal	1996
Knight of the Royal Order of the Seraphim	Sweden	1997
Grand Collar of the Order of the Nile	Egypt	1997
Honorary Companion of the Order of Canada	Canada	1998
Collar of the Order of Merit	Chile	1998
Companion of the Order of the Star of Ghana	Ghana	1998
Knight Grand Cross of the Royal Norwegian Order of St. Olav	Norway	1998
Knight Collar of the Order of Isabella the Catholic	Spain	1999
Knight of the Order of the Gold Lion of the House of Nassau	Luxembourg	1999
First Class of the Order of Prince Yaroslav the Wise	Ukraine	1999
Honorary Companion of the Order of Australia	Australia	1999
Civil Class of the Order of Oman	Oman	1999
Order of Islamic Republic	Iran	2001
Grand Commander of the Order of the Lion	Malawi	2002
Presidential Medal of Freedom	United States	2002
Order of Mapungubwe – Platinum Category	South Africa	2002
Bailiff Grand Cross of the Most Venerable Order of the Hospital of Saint John of Jerusalem	Commonwealth of Nations	2004
First Class Order of the Balkan Mountains	Bulgaria	2008
Order of the Aztec Eagle	Mexico	2010
Queen Elizabeth II Diamond Jubilee Medal (Canadian version)	Canada	2012
Grand Cordon of the National Order of the Republic	Burundi	2012
Service Medal in Bronze	South Africa	1996
Service Medal in Silver	South Africa	1996
Service Medal in Gold	South Africa	1996
Unitas Medal	South Africa	1996
Star for Bravery in Gold (SBG)	South Africa	1996
Star for Bravery in Silver (SBS)	South Africa	1996
Conspicuous Leadership Star (CLS)	South Africa	1996
Decoration for Merit in Gold (DMG)	South Africa	1996
Merit Medal in Silver (MMS)	South Africa	1996
Merit Medal in Bronze (MMB)	South Africa	1996

== Coat of arms ==
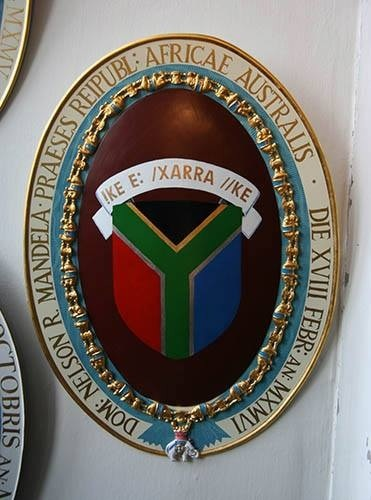
The coat of arms and motto used by Mandela as a knight of the Danish Order of the Elephant; he is not known to have any other coat of arms.

Coat of arms as a knight of the Swedish Order of the Seraphim, a difference of the achievement rendered above.
