= Nkwe =

Nkwe may refer to:

- Nkwe ya Gauta
- Nkwe ya Selefera
- Nkwe ya Boronse
- Nkwe Medal
- Enoch Nkwe, South African cricketer
- George Nkwe, Cameroonian pastor
- Malethola Maggie Nkwe, South African activist
