= Arthur Walker (pilot) =

South African Air Force pilot (1953–2016)

Arthur Walker HCG and Bar, SM
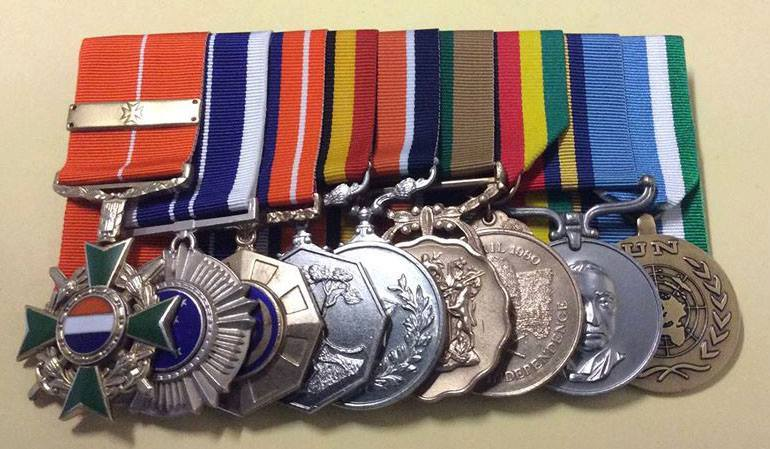
- Honoris Crux Gold and Bar, Southern Cross Medal, Pro Patria Medal, Southern Africa Medal, General Service Medal (South Africa), Good Service Medal, Bronze, Zimbabwean Independence Medal, General Service Medal (Rhodesia), ONUMOZ medal
- Born: 10 February 1953; Johannesburg, Transvaal Province, Union of South Africa
- Died: 28 March 2016 (aged 63)
- Military career
- Allegiance: South Africa
- Branch: South African Air Force
- Rank: Major
- Awards: Honoris Crux HCG & Bar Southern Cross Medal SM Pro Patria Medal Southern Africa Medal General Service Medal (South Africa) Good Service Medal Zimbabwean Independence Medal - 1980 General Service Medal United Nations Medal

Major Arthur Walker HCG and Bar, SM (February 1953 – 28 March 2016) was a South African Air Force helicopter pilot who was twice awarded the Honoris Crux Gold decoration during the South African Border War. The Honoris Crux Gold was the highest military award for bravery awarded to members of the South African Defence Force.

He matriculated from King Edward VII School in Johannesburg and went to the Army in 1971.

== Family ==
Walker was born in February 1953 in Johannesburg. His grandfather, Arthur Walker I, founded Walkerville, Gauteng and his father, Arthur Walker II, was a Springbok golfer.

== Military career ==
He obtained his pilot's wings in 1977 and flew for 7 Squadron, Rhodesian Air Force, before re-joining the South African Air Force in 1980.

While flying Alouette III helicopters based at AFB Ondangwa in 1981 he was awarded the Honoris Crux Gold for risking his life during a night operation in Angola, by turning on the lights of his helicopter to draw enemy fire away from another helicopter.

The citation for the Honoris Crux Gold reads:

During January 1981, two Alouettes, with Lieutenant Walker as flight leader, carried out close air support operations resulting in the Alouettes coming under intense enemy artillery and anti-aircraft fire. He only withdrew when ordered to do so. Later Lieutenant Walker returned to the contact area to provide top cover for a Puma helicopter assigned to casualty evacuation. Again he was subject to heavy enemy anti-aircraft fire. During the withdrawal, the second helicopter developed difficulties and called for assistance. Yet again Captain Walker returned to provide top cover, drawing virtually all the anti-aircraft fire to his Alouette. His courageous act prevented the loss of an Alouette and crew.

Lieutenant Walker's actions were not only an outstanding display of professionalism, devotion to duty and courage, but also constitutes exceptional deeds of bravery under enemy fire and makes him a worthy recipient of the Honoris Crux Gold.

In December 1981 he was cited for landing in enemy territory to search for and rescue the crew of a helicopter that had been shot down.

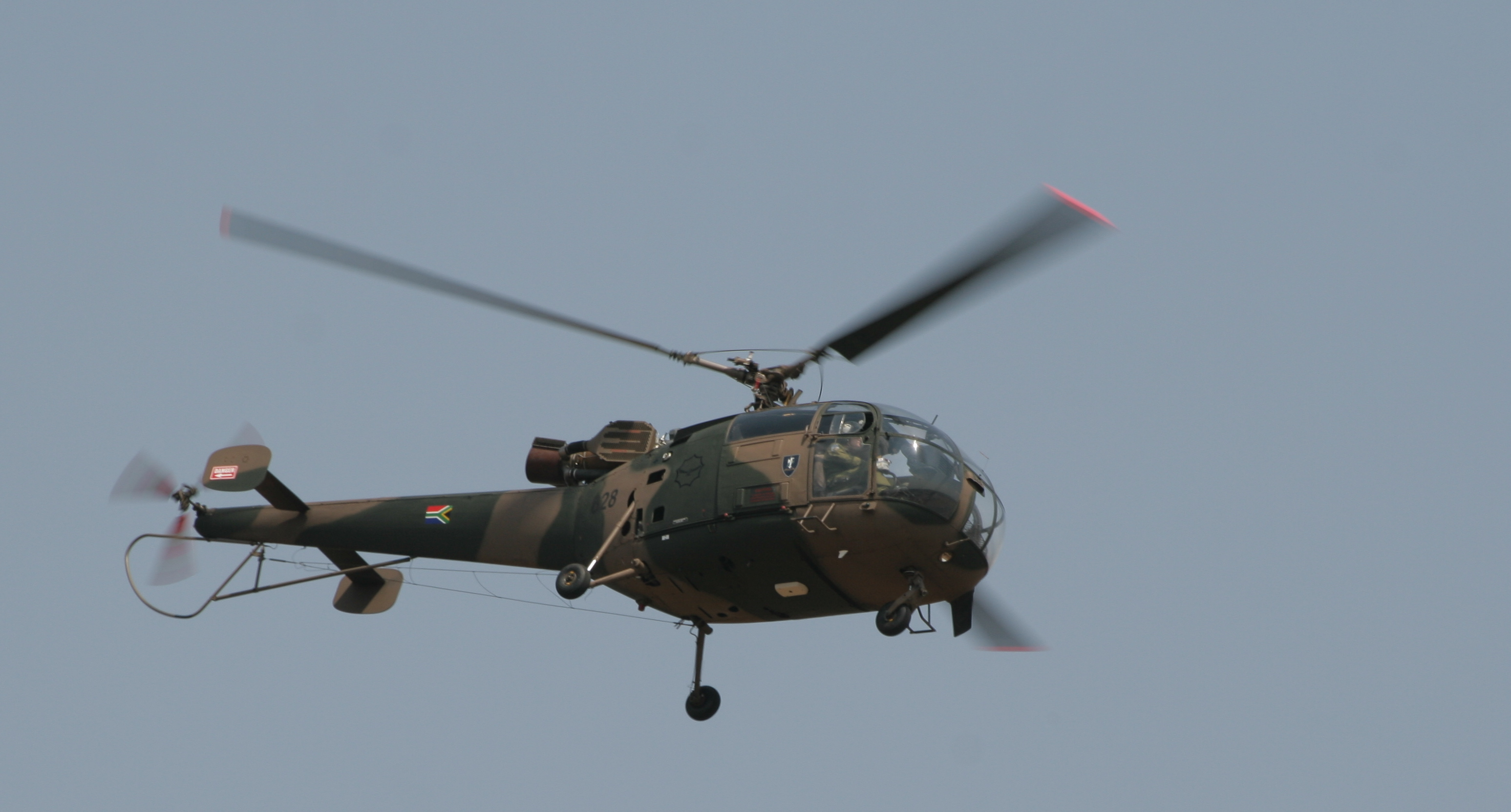
An Alouette III of the SAAF

The citation for the Bar to his Honoris Crux Gold reads:

During December 1981 Captain Walker was again requested to provide top cover for the evacuation of a seriously wounded soldier. On take-off with the evacuee his number two helicopter was hit and crash-landed. Without hesitation and with total disregard for his personal safety, Captain Walker landed near the wrecked helicopter and immediately searched for the crew. Eventually, the situation became suicidal, compelling Captain Walker and his crew to withdraw. When he was airborne he spotted the missing crew and yet again, without hesitation and despite the fact that virtually all enemy fire was now [aimed] in his direction, he landed and lifted the crew to safety.

Through this courageous deed he prevented the loss of two men. His distinguished actions, devotion to duty and courage make him a credit to the South African Defence Force in general, the South African Air Force in particular and makes him a worthy recipient of the Bar to the Honoris Crux Gold.

There was discontent amongst air force officers at Walker being awarded the Bar to the Honoris Crux Gold instead of the Honoris Crux Diamond. The Honoris Crux Diamond had never been awarded and there was rumoured opposition in defence headquarters to awarding this, the highest South African bravery award, to an English speaking officer.

He was later awarded the Southern Cross Medal for his work in developing Koevoet, a paramilitary-trained police counter insurgency unit in South West Africa.

=== Awards ===
Pilots Wings (Qualification)
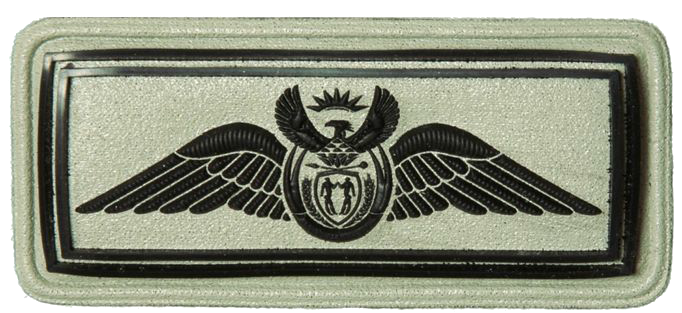
2500 plus hrs. Black on Thatch beige, Embossed. National Coat of Arms with large wings enclosed by two black rectangles

- Honoris Crux (Gold & Bar) (HCG & Bar)
- Southern Cross Medal (1975) (SM)
- Pro Patria Medal
- Southern Africa Medal
- General Service Medal (South Africa)
- Good Service Medal (Bronze (10 Years))
- Zimbabwean Independence Medal - 1980 (Bronze) (Zimbabwe)
- General Service Medal (Rhodesia)
- United Nations Medal (ONUMOZ - Mozambique) (United Nations)

== Executive Outcomes ==
After serving in the South African Air Force, Walker joined Executive Outcomes and flew Mi-17 and Mi-24 helicopters in Angola and Sierra Leone in support of Executive Outcomes operations.

== Death ==
Walker died of cancer on 28 March 2016 at the age of 63.
