= Bravery Star in Silver =

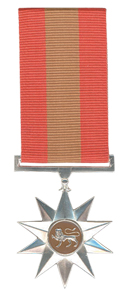
- Type: Military decoration for bravery
- Awarded for: Bravery
- Country: South Africa
- Presented by: the President
- Eligibility: Azanian People's Liberation Army cadres
- Post-nominals: BSS
- Campaign: The "struggle"
- Status: Discontinued in 2003
- Established: 1996
- Ribbon bar

APLA 1996 & SANDF post-2002 orders of wear
- Next (higher): APLA precedence: Gold Star for Bravery; SANDF precedence: Cross for Bravery
- Next (lower): APLA succession: Star for Conspicuous Leadership; SANDF succession: Star for Bravery in Silver

The Bravery Star in Silver, post-nominal letters BSS, was instituted by the President of the Republic of South Africa in April 1996. It was awarded to veteran cadres of the Azanian People's Liberation Army, the military wing of the Pan Africanist Congress, who had distinguished themselves during "the struggle" by performing acts of bravery.

== Azanian People's Liberation Army ==
The Azanian People's Liberation Army (APLA) was the para-military wing of the Pan Africanist Congress (PAC). It was established in 1961 to wage an armed "struggle" against the Nationalist government inside South Africa. On 27 April 1994 the Azanian People's Liberation Army was amalgamated with six other military forces into the South African National Defence Force (SANDF).

== Institution ==
The Bravery Star in Silver, post-nominal letters BSS, was instituted by the President of South Africa in April 1996. It is the middle award of a set of three decorations for bravery, along with the Gold Star for Bravery and the Star for Conspicuous Leadership.

The Azanian People's Liberation Army's military decorations and medals were modeled on those of the Republic of South Africa and these three decorations are the approximate equivalents of, respectively, the Honoris Crux Gold, the Honoris Crux (1975) and the Pro Virtute Decoration.

== Award criteria ==
The decoration could be awarded to veteran cadres of the Azanian People's Liberation Army who had distinguished themselves during "the struggle" by performing acts of bravery.

== Order of wear ==
The position of the Bravery Star in Silver in the official military and national orders of precedence was revised upon the institution of a new set of honours on 27 April 2003, but it remained unchanged.

Azanian People's Liberation Army

- Official APLA order of precedence:
  - Preceded by the Gold Star for Bravery (GSB).
  - Succeeded by the Star for Conspicuous Leadership (SCL).

South African National Defence Force until 26 April 2003

- Official SANDF order of precedence:

  - Preceded by the Cross for Bravery of the Republic of Transkei.
  - Succeeded by the Star for Bravery in Silver (SBS) of Umkhonto we Sizwe.
- Official national order of precedence:
  - Preceded by the Police Cross for Bravery (PCF) of the Republic of South Africa.
  - Succeeded by the Star for Bravery in Silver (SBS) of Umkhonto we Sizwe.

== Description ==
Obverse

The Bravery Star in Silver is a pair of five-pointed stars, superimposed one on the other and struck in silver to fit inside a circle with a diameter of 38 millimetres, displaying a silver lion on a ruby red enameled centre roundel.

Reverse

The reverse is smooth and displays the embellished pre-1994 South African Coat of Arms.

Ribbon

The ribbon is 32 millimetres wide and red, with a 12 millimetres wide gold band in the centre.

== Discontinuation ==
Conferment of the Bravery Star in Silver was discontinued upon the institution of a new set of honours on 27 April 2003.
