= Star for Conspicuous Leadership =

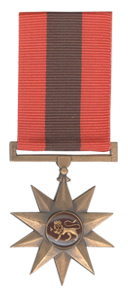
- Type: Military decoration for bravery
- Awarded for: Distinguished conduct and exceptional combat leadership
- Country: South Africa
- Presented by: the President
- Eligibility: Azanian People's Liberation Army cadres
- Post-nominals: SCL
- Campaign: The "struggle"
- Status: Discontinued in 2003
- Established: 1996
- Ribbon bar

APLA 1996 & SANDF post-2002 orders of wear
- Next (higher): APLA precedence: Bravery Star in Silver; SANDF precedence: Conspicuous Leadership Star
- Next (lower): APLA succession: Gold Decoration for Merit; SANDF succession: Defence Force Merit Decoration

The Star for Conspicuous Leadership, post-nominal letters SCL, was instituted by the President of the Republic of South Africa in April 1996. It was awarded to veteran cadres of the Azanian People's Liberation Army, the military wing of the Pan Africanist Congress, for distinguished conduct and exceptional combat leadership during the "struggle".

== Azanian People's Liberation Army ==
The Azanian People's Liberation Army (APLA) was the para-military wing of the Pan Africanist Congress (PAC). It was established in 1961 to wage an armed struggle against the Nationalist government inside South Africa. On 27 April 1994, the Azanian People's Liberation Army was amalgamated with six other military forces into the South African National Defence Force (SANDF).

== Institution ==
The Star for Conspicuous Leadership, post-nominal letters SCL, was instituted by the President of South Africa in April 1996. It is the junior award of a set of three decorations for bravery, along with the Gold Star for Bravery and the Bravery Star in Silver.

The Azanian People's Liberation Army's military decorations and medals were modeled on those of the Republic of South Africa and these three decorations are the approximate equivalents of, respectively, the Honoris Crux Gold, the Honoris Crux (1975) and the Pro Virtute Decoration.

== Award criteria ==
The decoration could be awarded to veteran cadres of the Azanian People's Liberation Army for distinguished conduct and exceptional combat leadership during the "struggle".

== Order of wear ==
The position of the Star for Conspicuous Leadership in the official military and national orders of precedence was revised upon the institution of a new set of honours on 27 April 2003, but it remained unchanged.

Azanian People's Liberation Army

- Official APLA order of precedence:
  - Preceded by the Bravery Star in Silver (BSS).
  - Succeeded by the Gold Decoration for Merit (GDM).

South African National Defence Force until 26 April 2003

- Official SANDF order of precedence:
  - Preceded by the Conspicuous Leadership Star (CLS) of Umkhonto we Sizwe.
  - Succeeded by the Defence Force Merit Decoration of the Republic of Bophuthatswana.
- Official national order of precedence:
  - Preceded by the Conspicuous Leadership Star (CLS) of Umkhonto we Sizwe.
  - Succeeded by the Police Star for Distinguished Service (SOO) of the Republic of South Africa.

== Description ==
Obverse

The Star for Conspicuous Leadership is a pair of five-pointed stars, superimposed one on the other and struck in bronze, to fit inside a circle with a diameter of 38 millimetres and displaying a bronze lion on a ruby red enameled centre roundel.

Ribbon

The ribbon is 32 millimetres wide and red, with a 12 millimetres wide dark brown band in the centre.

== Discontinuation ==
Conferment of the Star for Conspicuous Leadership was discontinued upon the institution of a new set of honours on 27 April 2003.
