= United Nations Security Council Resolution 850 =

UN Security Council Resolution 850
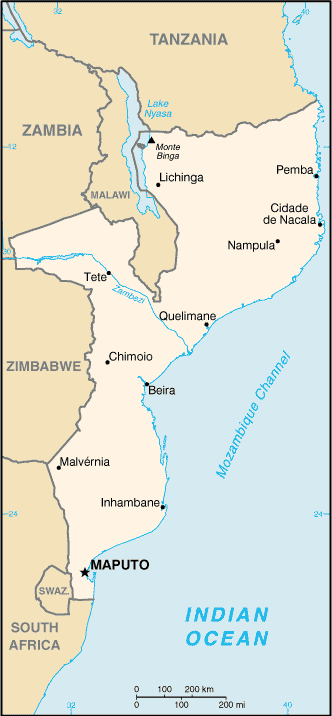
- Mozambique
- Date: 9 July 1993
- Meeting no.: 3,253
- Code: S/RES/850 (Document)
- Subject: Mozambique
- Voting summary: 15 voted for; None voted against; None abstained
- Result: Adopted

Security Council composition
- Permanent members: China; France; Russia; United Kingdom; United States
- Non-permanent members: Brazil; Cape Verde; Djibouti; Hungary; Japan; Morocco; New Zealand; Pakistan; Spain; Venezuela

United Nations Security Council resolution 850, adopted unanimously on 9 July 1993, after reaffirming resolutions 782 (1992), 797 (1992) and 818 (1993) on the situation in Mozambique, the Council discussed the implementation of the Rome General Peace Accords and the formation of a new armed forces in the country.

The Council reiterated the importance it attached to the Peace Accords, but expressed concern at the delays in implementing some aspects of them. At the same time, it was encouraged by the ceasefire held between the Government of Mozambique and RENAMO, and welcomed the Status of Forces Agreement between Mozambique and the United Nations and the full deployment of the military components of the United Nations Operation in Mozambique (ONUMOZ). The withdrawal of troops from Malawi and Zimbabwe was also welcomed.

Tributes were paid to the Special Representative of the Secretary-General, to the Force Commander of ONUMOZ, and to the military and civilian personnel of ONUMOZ for their dedication to helping the people of Mozambique achieve democracy in the country. Progress in implementing the peace agreement was welcomed though there was concern about the delays in particular the contraction and demobilisation of troops, the formation of a new army unit and the preparation for elections to be held no later than October 1994. A scheduled meeting between the Mozambican government and RENAMO on those issues was welcomed. Both parties were urged to begin the contraction and demobilisation of their forces and military personnel to Nyanga, Zimbabwe and to dispatch the first newly trained elements of the Mozambican Defense Force.

The recommendation of the Secretary-General that ONUMOZ should chair the Joint Commission for the Formation of the Mozambican Defence Force was approved, urging co-operation by RENAMO and on the understanding that it would not entail any obligation on the part of the United Nations for training or establishing the new armed forces. The importance of establishing the Commission of State Administration was stressed, as was the application throughout the country of the provisions of the Rome General Peace Accords concerning public administration. Meanwhile, all foreign donations in support of the peace process were welcomed, in particular the contribution of Italy to the Trust Fund.

The resolution concluded by requiring the Secretary-General Boutros Boutros-Ghali to report back by 18 August 1993, on the outcome of the discussions.

== See also ==
- History of Mozambique
- List of United Nations Security Council Resolutions 801 to 900 (1993–1994)
- Mozambican Civil War
