= Gold Star for Bravery =

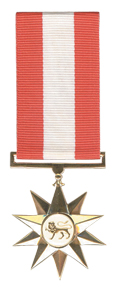
- Type: Military decoration for bravery
- Awarded for: Exceptional bravery in great danger
- Country: South Africa
- Presented by: the President
- Eligibility: Azanian People's Liberation Army cadres
- Post-nominals: GSB
- Campaign: The "struggle"
- Status: Discontinued in 2003
- Established: 1996
- Ribbon bar

APLA 1996 & SANDF post-2002 orders of wear
- Next (higher): SANDF precedence: Honoris Crux Gold
- Next (lower): APLA succession: Bravery Star in Silver; SANDF succession: Star for Bravery in Gold

The Gold Star for Bravery, post-nominal letters GSB, was instituted by the President of the Republic of South Africa in April 1996. It was awarded to veteran cadres of the Azanian People's Liberation Army, the military wing of the Pan Africanist Congress, who had distinguished themselves during the "struggle" by performing acts of exceptional bravery in great danger.

== Azanian People's Liberation Army ==
The Azanian People's Liberation Army (APLA) was the para-military wing of the Pan Africanist Congress (PAC). It was established in 1961 to wage an armed "struggle" against the Nationalist government inside South Africa. On 27 April 1994, the Azanian People's Liberation Army was amalgamated with six other military forces into the South African National Defence Force (SANDF).

== Institution ==
The Gold Star for Bravery, post-nominal letters GSB, was instituted by the President of South Africa in April 1996. It is the senior award of a set of three decorations for bravery, along with the Bravery Star in Silver and the Star for Conspicuous Leadership.

The Azanian People's Liberation Army's military decorations and medals were modeled on those of the Republic of South Africa and these three decorations are the approximate equivalents of, respectively, the Honoris Crux Gold, the Honoris Crux (1975) and the Pro Virtute Decoration.

== Award criteria ==
The decoration could be awarded to veteran cadres of the Azanian People's Liberation Army who had distinguished themselves during the "struggle" by performing acts of exceptional bravery in great danger.

== Order of wear ==
The position of the Gold Star for Bravery in the official military and national orders of precedence was revised upon the institution of a new set of honours on 27 April 2003, but it remained unchanged, as it had been until 26 April 2003.

Azanian People's Liberation Army

- Official APLA order of precedence:
  - Succeeded by the Bravery Star in Silver (BSS).

South African National Defence Force

- Official SANDF order of precedence:
  - Preceded by the Honoris Crux Gold (HCG) of the Republic of South Africa.
  - Succeeded by the Star for Bravery in Gold (SBG) of Umkhonto we Sizwe.
- Official national order of precedence:
  - Preceded by the Woltemade Cross for Bravery, Gold (WD) of the Republic of South Africa.
  - Succeeded by the Star for Bravery in Gold (SBG) of Umkhonto we Sizwe.

== Description ==
Obverse

The Gold Star for Bravery is a pair of silver-gilt five-pointed stars, superimposed one on the other, to fit inside a circle with a diameter of 38 millimetres and displaying a gold lion on a white enameled centre roundel.

Ribbon

The ribbon is 32 millimetres wide and red, with a 12 millimetres wide white band in the centre.

== Discontinuation ==
Conferment of the Gold Star for Bravery was discontinued upon the institution of a new set of military honours on 27 April 2003.
