= HCG =

HCG may refer to:

- Historic Centre of Guimarães, a UNESCO World Heritage Site
- Hickson Compact Group, a set of galaxies
- Hellenic Coast Guard, the coast guard of Greece
- Honoris Crux Gold, of the Republic of South Africa
- Hoppers Crossing railway station, Melbourne
- Human chorionic gonadotropin (hCG)
  - HCG pregnancy strip test
