= Conspicuous Leadership Star =

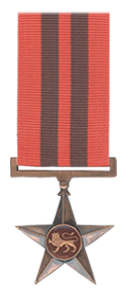
- Type: Military decoration for bravery
- Awarded for: Distinguished conduct and exceptional combat leadership
- Country: South Africa
- Presented by: the President
- Eligibility: Umkhonto we Sizwe cadres
- Post-nominals: CLS
- Campaign: Internal resistance to apartheid
- Status: Discontinued in 2003
- Established: 1996
- Ribbon bar

MK 1996 & SANDF post-2002 orders of wear
- Next (higher): MK precedence: Star for Bravery in Silver; SANDF precedence: Pro Merito Decoration
- Next (lower): MK succession: Decoration for Merit in Gold; SANDF succession: Star for Conspicuous Leadership

The Conspicuous Leadership Star, post-nominal letters CLS, was instituted by the President of the Republic of South Africa in April 1996. It was awarded to veteran cadres of Umkhonto we Sizwe, the military wing of the African National Congress, who have distinguished themselves during the struggle against apartheid by distinguished conduct and exceptional combat leadership.

== Umkhonto we Sizwe ==
Umkhonto we Sizwe, abbreviated as MK, Zulu for "Spear of the Nation", was the para-military wing of the African National Congress (ANC). It was established on 16 December 1961 to wage an armed "struggle" against the Nationalist government inside South Africa. On 27 April 1994, Umkhonto we Sizwe was amalgamated with six other military forces into the South African National Defence Force (SANDF).

== Institution ==
The Conspicuous Leadership Star, post-nominal letters CLS, was instituted by the President of South Africa in April 1996. It is the junior award of a set of three decorations for bravery, along with the Star for Bravery in Gold and the Star for Bravery in Silver.

Umkhonto we Sizwe's military decorations and medals were modeled on those of the South African Defence Force and these three decorations are the approximate equivalents of, respectively, the Honoris Crux Gold, the Honoris Crux (1975) and the Pro Virtute Decoration.

== Award criteria ==
The decoration could be awarded to veteran cadres of Umkhonto we Sizwe who have distinguished themselves during the "struggle" by distinguished conduct and exceptional combat leadership.

== Order of wear ==
The position of the Conspicuous Leadership Star in the official military and national orders of precedence was revised upon the institution of a new set of honours on 27 April 2003, but it remained unchanged.

Umkhonto we Sizwe

- Official MK order of precedence:
  - Preceded by the Star for Bravery in Silver (SBS).
  - Succeeded by the Decoration for Merit in Gold (DMG).

South African National Defence Force until 26 April 2003

- Official SANDF order of precedence:
  - Preceded by the Pro Merito Decoration (PMD) of the Republic of South Africa.
  - Succeeded by the Star for Conspicuous Leadership (SCL) of the Azanian People's Liberation Army.
- Official national order of precedence:
  - Preceded by the Pro Merito Decoration (PMD) of the Republic of South Africa.
  - Succeeded by the Star for Conspicuous Leadership (SCL) of the Azanian People's Liberation Army.

== Description ==
Obverse

The Conspicuous Leadership Star is a five-pointed star, struck in bronze, to fit inside a circle with a diameter of 38 millimetres, displaying a bronze lion on a ruby red enameled centre roundel.

Ribbon

The ribbon is 32 millimetres wide and red, with two 6 millimetres wide brown bands in the centre, spaced 4 millimetres apart.

== Discontinuation ==
Conferment of the Conspicuous Leadership Star was discontinued upon the institution of a new set of honours on 27 April 2003.
