= Star for Bravery in Gold =

- Type: Military decoration for bravery
- Awarded for: Exceptional bravery in great danger
- Country: South Africa
- Presented by: the President
- Eligibility: Umkhonto we Sizwe cadres
- Post-nominals: SBG
- Campaign: The "struggle"
- Status: Discontinued in 2003
- Established: 1996
- Ribbon bar

MK 1996 & SANDF post-2002 orders of wear
- Next (higher): SANDF precedence: Gold Star for Bravery
- Next (lower): MK succession: Star for Bravery in Silver; SANDF succession: Nkwe ya Gauta

The Star for Bravery in Gold, post-nominal letters SBG, was instituted by the President of the Republic of South Africa in April 1996. It was awarded to veteran cadres of Umkhonto we Sizwe, the military wing of the African National Congress, who have distinguished themselves during the "struggle" by performing acts of exceptional bravery in great danger.

== Umkhonto we Sizwe ==
Umkhonto we Sizwe, abbreviated as MK, "Spear of the Nation" in Zulu, was the para-military wing of the African National Congress (ANC). It was established on 16 December 1961 to wage an armed "struggle" against the Nationalist government inside South Africa. On 27 April 1994, Umkhonto we Sizwe was amalgamated with six other military forces into the South African National Defence Force (SANDF).

== Institution ==
The Star for Bravery in Gold, post-nominal letters SBG, was instituted by the President of South Africa in April 1996. It is the senior award of a set of three decorations for bravery, along with the Star for Bravery in Silver and the Conspicuous Leadership Star.

Umkhonto we Sizwe's military decorations and medals were modeled on those of the South African Defence Force and these three decorations are the approximate equivalents of, respectively, the Honoris Crux Gold, the Honoris Crux (1975) and the Pro Virtute Decoration.

== Award criteria ==
The decoration could be awarded to veteran cadres of Umkhonto we Sizwe who had distinguished themselves during the "struggle" by performing acts of exceptional bravery in great danger.

== Order of wear ==
The position of the Star for Bravery in Gold in the official military and national orders of precedence was revised upon the institution of a new set of honours on 27 April 2003.

Umkhonto we Sizwe

- Official MK order of precedence:
  - Succeeded by the Star for Bravery in Silver (SBS).

South African National Defence Force until 26 April 2003

- Official SANDF order of precedence:
  - Preceded by the Gold Star for Bravery (GSB) of the Azanian People's Liberation Army.
  - Succeeded by the Star of South Africa, Gold (SSA) of the Republic of South Africa.
- Official national order of precedence:
  - Preceded by the Gold Star for Bravery (GSB) of the Azanian People's Liberation Army.
  - Succeeded by the Order of the Southern Cross, Class I, Gold (OSG) of the Republic of South Africa.

South African National Defence Force from 27 April 2003

- Official SANDF order of precedence:
  - Preceded by the Gold Star for Bravery (GSB) of the Azanian People's Liberation Army.
  - Succeeded by the Nkwe ya Gauta (NG) of the Republic of South Africa.
- Official national order of precedence:
  - Preceded by the Gold Star for Bravery (GSB) of the Azanian People's Liberation Army.
  - Succeeded by the Nkwe ya Gauta (NG) of the Republic of South Africa.

== Description ==
Obverse

The Star for Bravery in Gold is a silver-gilt five-pointed star, to fit inside a circle with a diameter of 38 millimetres and displaying a gold lion on a white enameled centre roundel.

Ribbon

The ribbon is 32 millimetres wide and red, with two 6 millimetres wide white bands in the centre, spaced 4 millimetres apart.

== Discontinuation ==
Conferment of the Star for Bravery in Gold was discontinued upon the institution of a new set of South African honours on 27 April 2003.
