= United Nations Security Council Resolution 818 =

UN Security Council Resolution 818
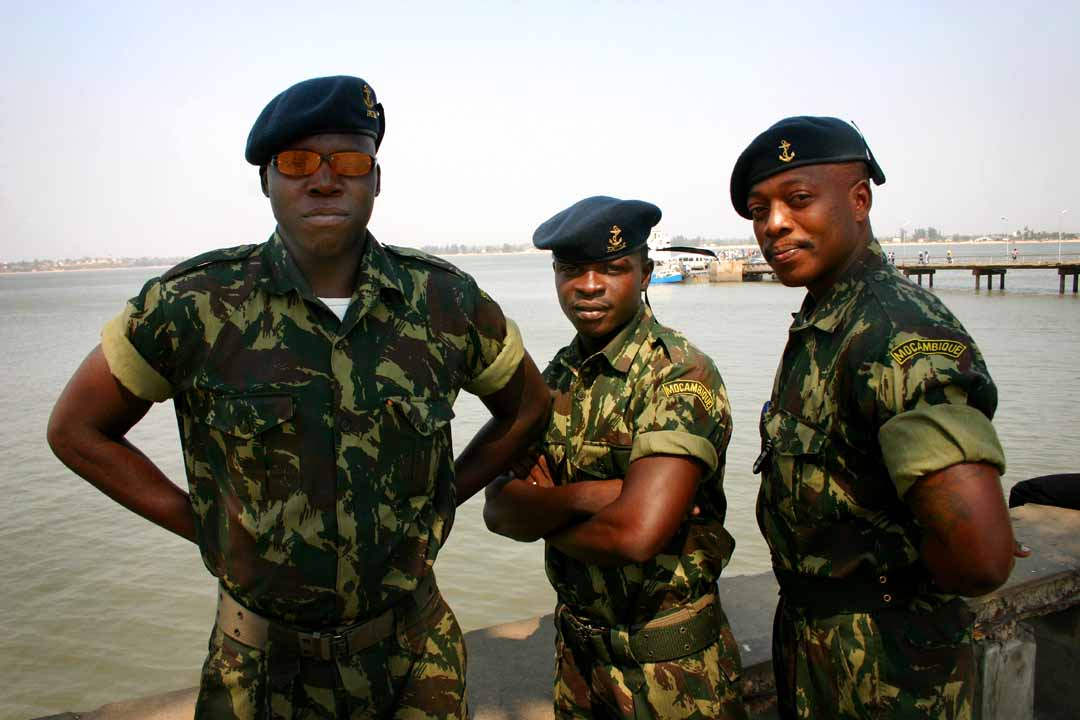
- Mozambican soldiers
- Date: 14 April 1993
- Meeting no.: 3,198
- Code: S/RES/818 (Document)
- Subject: Mozambique
- Voting summary: 15 voted for; None voted against; None abstained
- Result: Adopted

Security Council composition
- Permanent members: China; France; Russia; United Kingdom; United States
- Non-permanent members: Brazil; Cape Verde; Djibouti; Hungary; Japan; Morocco; New Zealand; Pakistan; Spain; Venezuela

United Nations Security Council resolution 818, adopted unanimously on 14 April 1993, after reaffirming resolutions 782 (1992) and 797 (1992) on the situation in Mozambique, the Council stressed its concern regarding the delays and difficulties affecting the implementation of the peace process envisaged in the Rome General Peace Accords during the Mozambican Civil War.

The resolution called upon the Government of Mozambique and RENAMO to co-operate with the Secretary-General Boutros Boutros-Ghali and the Special Representative during the implementation of the mandate of the United Nations Operation in Mozambique (ONUMOZ), and further urged both to comply with the commitments they entered into with the Peace Accords, particularly in relation to the concentration, assembly and demobilisation of their armed troops and the formation of a new armed forces. In this respect, it called for the training of the new Mozambican Defence Force as soon as possible.

Further addressing the two parties, the resolution welcomed the announcement of both to convene as soon as possible a meeting between the President of Mozambique and the President of RENAMO and at the same time appealed to RENAMO to ensure uninterrupted functioning of the joint Commissions and monitoring mechanisms and for both parties to respect the ceasefire and allow freedom of movement and goods. It also called for the freedom of movement of ONUMOZ, welcomed the Secretary-General's intention to deploy the peacekeeping force and stressed the importance of the early signature of the status of forces agreement between the Government of Mozambique and the United Nations to facilitate free, efficient and effective operation of ONUMOZ in the country. The agreement was signed on 14 May 1993.

The Council concluded by welcoming the efforts of Member States in Mozambique and requested the Secretary-General to submit, by 30 June 1993, a report on the situation in the country, including preparations for the elections and the demobilisation of Mozambican forces.

== See also ==
- Elections in Mozambique
- History of Mozambique
- List of United Nations Security Council Resolutions 801 to 900 (1993–1994)
