= Nkwe ya Gauta =

South African military bravery medal

Nkwe ya Gauta Golden Leopard
- Type: Military decoration for bravery
- Awarded for: Acts of exceptional bravery during military operations
- Country: South Africa
- Presented by: the President
- Eligibility: All ranks
- Post-nominals: NG
- Status: Current
- Established: 27 April 2003
- Ribbon bar

Order of wear
- Next (higher): Star for Bravery in Gold
- Next (lower): Star of South Africa, Gold

The Nkwe ya Gauta - Golden Leopard, post-nominal letters NG, is a military decoration for bravery which was instituted in 2003, to replace the Honoris Crux Gold (HCG). It is South Africa's highest military decoration for bravery.

== The South African military ==
The Union Defence Forces (UDF) were established in 1912 and renamed the South African Defence Force (SADF) in 1958. On 27 April 1994, it was integrated with six other independent forces into the South African National Defence Force (SANDF).

== Institution ==
The Nkwe ya Gauta - Golden Leopard, post-nominal letters NG, was instituted by the President of the Republic of South Africa on 16 April 2003 and came into effect on 27 April 2003. The bilingual title of the decoration is in Sesotho and English. This decoration replaced the Honoris Crux Gold (HCG) as South Africa's highest military decoration for bravery. It is the senior of a set of three military decorations for bravery, along with the Nkwe ya Selefera - Silver Leopard and the Nkwe ya Boronse - Bronze Leopard.

== Award criteria ==
The Nkwe ya Gauta - Golden Leopard can be awarded to all ranks of the South African National Defence Force and of any Auxiliary Service of the SANDF, and of any Armed Forces attached to, or serving with, or rendering any service to the SANDF, who have distinguished themselves by performing acts of exceptional bravery, on a single occasion or over a period of time, during military operations.

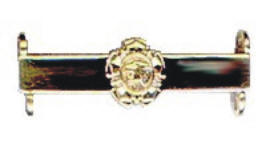
Bar to the Nkwe ya Gauta - Golden Leopard

A Bar may be awarded for every subsequent action which would make recipients eligible for the award of the same decoration. The decoration and bar may be awarded posthumously.

Guidelines consisting of appropriate phrases which may be useful when writing a citation for the award of the Nkwe ya Gauta - Golden Leopard have been published by the South African Defence Department.

- Deliberate but daring and courageous actions, on a single occasion or over a period of time.
- A single act of valour, or most conspicuous bravery, or daring or pre-eminent act of self-sacrifice, or extreme devotion to duty in the presence of an enemy.
- A real threat of loss of own life.
- Placing a high premium on the prevention of the loss of lives.
- Actions vital to attain success.
- Perseverance under extremely difficult situations.

== Order of wear ==
The position of the Nkwe ya Gauta - Golden Leopard in the official military and national orders of precedence is as follows:

Official military order of precedence

- Preceded by the Star for Bravery in Gold (SBG) of Umkhonto we Sizwe.
- Succeeded by the Star of South Africa, Gold (SSA) of the Republic of South Africa.

Official national order of precedence

- Preceded by the Star for Bravery in Gold (SBG) of Umkhonto we Sizwe.
- Succeeded by the Mendi Decoration for Bravery, Gold (MDG) of the Republic of South Africa.

== Description ==
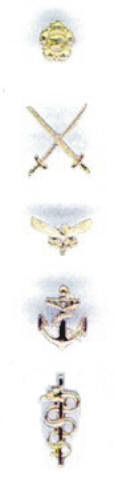
Bar button and insignia for the Army, Air Force, Navy and Military Health Service

Obverse

The Nkwe ya Gauta - Golden Leopard is a five-armed cross pattée struck in 9 carat gold, with a diameter of 38 millimetres. The arms of the cross are faceted per chevron, embowed throughout and the extremities also embowed, with each pair of arms of the cross separated by three short rays. In the centre of the obverse is a light blue enamel roundel, 19 millimetres in diameter, with a golden leopard's head.

Reverse

The reverse bears, in relief, the coat of arms of South Africa. The decoration is attached to a plain gold suspender, fixed to the upper arm of the decoration. The medal number is impressed or engraved below the coat of arms.

Ribbon

The ribbon is 32 millimetres wide and sky blue with 6 millimetres wide gold edges. The blue represents the feathers of the blue crane, which Xhosa kings used to present to brave warriors.

Bar

The Bar for subsequent conferments of the Nkwe ya Gauta - Golden Leopard is 33 millimetres wide and 5 millimetres high, struck in 9 carat gold and embossed in the centre with a replica of the decoration. When only a ribbon bar is worn, a button replica of the decoration, 8 millimetres in diameter and struck in 9 carat gold, is affixed to the ribbon bar.

Insignia

Award of the decoration for service in active military operations is indicated by distinguishing insignia which indicate the arm of the service in which the recipient was serving at the time of the action for which the decoration was conferred. These insignia are struck in 9 carat gold and are worn on the ribbon, above any bars which may have been awarded.

- Crossed swords for the South African Army.
- An eagle for the South African Air Force.
- An Anchor for the South African Navy.
- The Rod of Aesculapius for the South African Military Health Service.

== Recipients ==
In respect of those recipients about whom it is available, the actions they were cited for following below the table, since inclusion in the table itself is impractical.

Name	Rank	NG no.	Date of action	Unit	Service Arm
Ramdin, Amrithlall Tothara † (Note: Ramdin, Amrithlall Tothara – Awarded for his action in attempting to rescue three staff members of the Department of Public Works from a gas-filled sewage pit at the Durban Naval Base.)	LS	018	17 Feb 2017	Naval Base Durban	SA Navy
Borg, Able Seaman Henro ter Borg † (Note: Borg, Henro ter Borg – Awarded for his action in attempting to rescue three staff members of the Department of Public Works from a gas-filled sewage pit at the Durban Naval Base.)	AB	019	17 Feb 2017	Naval Base Durban	SA Navy
Mundell, Seaman Francois William Mundell † (Note: Mundell, Francois William – Awarded for his action in attempting to rescue three staff members of the Department of Public Works from a gas-filled sewage pit at the Durban Naval Base.)	SM	020	17 Feb 2017	Naval Base Durban	SA Navy

Note 1: † denotes a posthumous award.
