= Nkwe ya Selefera =

South African military decoration

Nkwe ya Selefera Silver Leopard
- Type: Military decoration for bravery
- Awarded for: Acts of conspicuous bravery during military operations
- Country: South Africa
- Presented by: the President
- Eligibility: All ranks
- Post-nominals: NS
- Status: Current
- Established: 27 April 2003
- First award: 2003
- Ribbon bar

Order of wear
- Next (higher): Star for Bravery in Silver
- Next (lower): Pro Virtute Decoration

The Nkwe ya Selefera - Silver Leopard, post-nominal letters NS, was instituted by the President of the Republic of South Africa on 16 April 2003 and came into effect on 27 April 2003. It is South Africa's second highest military decoration for bravery.

== The South African military ==
The Union Defence Forces (UDF) were established in 1912 and renamed the South African Defence Force (SADF) in 1958. On 27 April 1994, it was integrated with six other independent forces into the South African National Defence Force (SANDF).

== Institution ==
The Nkwe ya Selefera - Silver Leopard, post-nominal letters NS, was instituted by the President of South Africa on 16 April 2003 and came into effect on 27 April 2003. The bilingual title of the decoration is in Sesotho and English. This decoration replaced the Honoris Crux (HC) as South Africa's second highest military decoration for bravery. It is the middle award of a set of three military decorations for bravery, along with the Nkwe ya Gauta - Golden Leopard and the Nkwe ya Boronse - Bronze Leopard.

== Award criteria ==
The Nkwe ya Selefera - Silver Leopard can be awarded to all ranks of the SANDF and of any Auxiliary Service of the SANDF, and of any Armed Forces attached to or serving with or rendering any service to the SANDF, who have distinguished themselves by performing acts of conspicuous bravery on a single occasion or over a period of time during military operations.

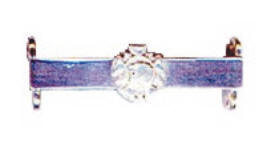
Bar to the Nkwe ya Selefera - Silver Leopard

A Bar may be awarded for every subsequent action which would make recipients eligible for the award of the same decoration. The decoration and bar may be awarded posthumously.

Guidelines consisting of appropriate phrases, which may be useful when writing a citation for the award of the Nkwe ya Selefera - Silver Leopard, have been published by the South African Defence Department.

- Deliberate but daring and conspicuous actions on a single occasion or over a period of time.
- A dangerous, serious and/or critical situation.
- A possibility of loss of own life and/or endangered own life for others.
- Actions contributory to success.
- Perseverance under trying circumstances.

== Order of wear ==
The position of the Nkwe ya Selefera - Silver Leopard in the official military and national orders of precedence is as follows:

Official military order of precedence

- Preceded by the Star for Bravery in Silver (SBS) of Umkhonto we Sizwe.
- Succeeded by the Pro Virtute Decoration (PVD) of the Republic of South Africa.

Official national order of precedence

- Preceded by the Star for Bravery in Silver (SBS) of Umkhonto we Sizwe.
- Succeeded by the Mendi Decoration for Bravery, Silver (MDS) of the Republic of South Africa.

== Description ==
Obverse

The Nkwe ya Selefera - Silver Leopard is a five-armed cross pattée, struck in silver, with a diameter of 38 millimetres. The arms of the cross are bordered and the extremities embowed, with each pair of arms of the cross separated by three short rays. In the centre of the obverse is a light blue enamel roundel, 19 millimetres in diameter, with a silver leopard's head.

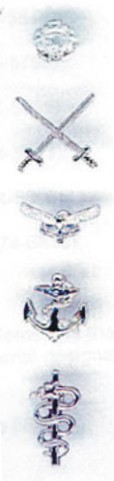
Bar button and insignia for the Army, Air Force, Navy and Military Health Service

Reverse

The reverse bears, in relief, the coat of arms of South Africa. The decoration is attached to a plain silver suspender, affixed to the upper arm of the decoration. The decoration number is stamped or engraved below the coat of arms.

Ribbon

The ribbon is 32 millimetres wide and sky blue, with 6 millimetres wide white edges. The blue represents the feathers of the blue crane, which Xhosa kings used to present to brave warriors.

Bar

The Bar for subsequent conferments of the Nkwe ya Selefera - Silver Leopard is 33 millimetres in length and 5 millimetres wide, struck in silver and embossed in the centre with a replica of the decoration. When only a ribbon bar is worn, a button replica of the decoration, 8 millimetres in diameter and struck in silver, is affixed to the ribbon bar.

Insignia

Award of the decoration for service in active military operations is indicated by distinguishing insignia, which indicate the arm of the service in which the recipient was serving at the time of the action for which the decoration was conferred. The insignia are struck in silver and is worn on the ribbon, above any bars which may have been awarded.

- Crossed swords for the South African Army.
- An eagle for the South African Air Force.
- An Anchor for the South African Navy.
- The Rod of Aesculapius for the South African Military Health Service.

== Recipients ==
In respect of those recipients about whom it is available, the actions they were cited for follow below the table, since inclusion in the table itself is impractical.

Name	Rank	NS no.	Date of action	Unit	Service Arm	Photo
Selvan, Vasudevan (Note: Selvan, Vasudevan – Awarded for his action in saving the life of a SANDF Special Forces Officer during Operation FIBRE, while stationed in Bujumbura, Burundi.)	Sgt	001	20 Feb 2002	15 Sqn	SAAF	
Lechoenyo, Solomon Sehularo MMM (Note: Lechoenyo, Solomon Sehularo – Awarded for actions during the Battle of Bangui in the Central African Republic from 22 to 24 March 2013.)	Lt Col	015	22 Mar 2013	5 SFR	SA Army	

Note 1: † denotes a posthumous award.
