= George Nkwe =

Cameroonian pastor

George Nkwe (fl. 1866) was the first Cameroonian pastor, ordained in 1866 by British Baptist missionary Alfred Saker. A native Bamileke, Nkwe was kidnapped and sold into slavery at a young age, eventually becoming a slave of King Mpondo Ngando Akwa II of the Duala.
