= Honoris Crux Diamond =

- Type: Military decoration for bravery
- Awarded for: Death-defying heroic deeds of outstanding valour
- Country: South Africa
- Presented by: the State President
- Eligibility: All Ranks
- Post-nominals: HCD
- Status: Discontinued in 1993
- Established: 1975
- First award: Never awarded
- Ribbon bar

The Honoris Crux Diamond (Diamond Cross of Honour), post-nominal letters HCD, was a military decoration for bravery that was instituted by the Republic of South Africa on 1 July 1975, but never awarded. The decoration was intended for award to members of the South African Defence Force for death-defying heroic deeds of outstanding valour.

== Institution ==
The Honoris Crux Diamond (Diamond Cross of Honour), post-nominal letters HCD, was instituted by the State President on 1 July 1975.

== Award criteria ==
The decoration could be awarded to members of the South African Defence Force for death-defying heroic deeds of outstanding valour. It was the most senior of a set of four classes of Honoris Crux decorations, the Honoris Crux Diamond, Honoris Crux Gold, Honoris Crux Silver and Honoris Crux, that together replaced the discontinued Honoris Crux of 1952.

== Description ==
Obverse

The Honoris Crux Diamond was a silver-gilt Maltese cross that fits in a circle 45 millimetres in diameter, with two swords in saltire surmounted by a circular protea wreath, the arms of the cross in green enamel, with a roundel in the centre tierced horizontally in the orange, white and blue bands of the national flag, framed in a double circle containing eight diamonds set in green enamel. Apart from the eight diamonds in the enameled circle, it is identical to the Honoris Crux Gold in all respects.

Reverse

The reverse had the pre-1994 South African Coat of Arms, with the decoration number underneath.

Ribbon

The ribbon was 32 millimetres wide and orange.

== Discontinuation ==
Since it was never awarded and now never will be, the Honoris Crux Diamond was no longer listed in the official order of precedence lists, as published in the Republic of South Africa Government Gazette, since 1993.

Only one Honoris Crux Diamond Decoration was ever struck. The Department of Defence donated it to the South African National Museum of Military History in Johannesburg on 21 May 2009.
