= Zimbabwean Independence Medal, 1980 =

Commemorative award in Zimbabwe

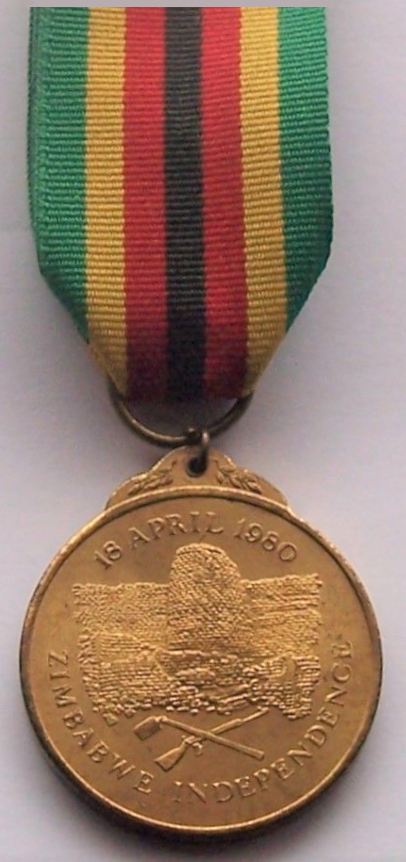
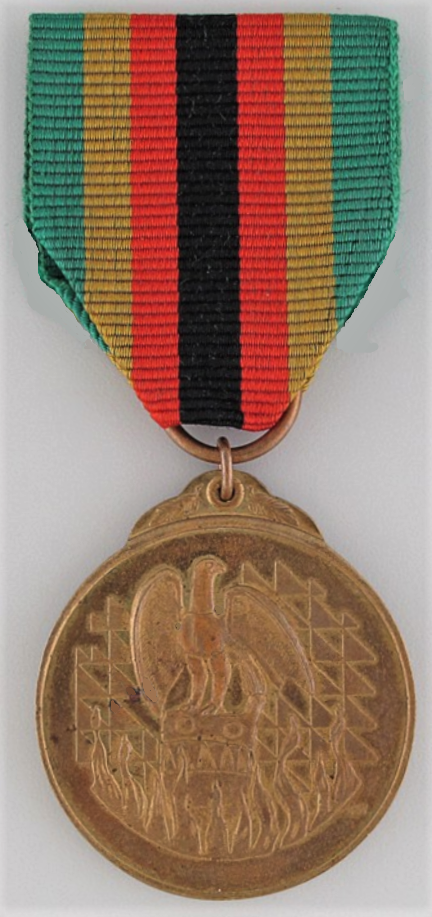
- Obverse and reverse of the medal in bronze
- Type: Commemorative medal
- Awarded for: Zimbabwean Independence
- Ribbon of the medal

The Zimbabwean Independence Medal, 1980 was instituted on 17 April 1980 for award to those who were involved in the Zimbabwean independence process or commemorations in some way.

== Description ==
The medal was awarded in silver and bronze.

The obverse depicts the Zimbabwe Ruins (Great Zimbabwe) in Masvingo Province; crossed gun and hoe; with the date of Zimbabwe's independence, 18 April 1980.

The reverse depicts a Zimbabwe bird rising from the fire.

Ribbon - 38mm divided into seven parts: Green (6mm), Gold (5mm), Red (5mm), Black (6mm), repeated in reverse. Award of a silver medal denoted by Silver rose emblem.

== Eligibility ==
Awarded to any person or group or category of persons nominated by the Prime Minister.

The medal is often seen on its own, but can be found in a pair with the British and Commonwealth Rhodesia Medal, since all recipients of the Rhodesia Medal also received the Zimbabwean Independence Medal. However, British personnel did not have permission to wear it in uniform, while New Zealand granted approval for restricted wear only. With regard to Rhodesian recipients, the Independence Medal is commonly found with the Rhodesian General Service Medal.

== Recipients ==
- Mark Kelly (Australian general)
- Arthur W. Walker, Rhodesian Air Force pilot
