= United Nations Security Council Resolution 782 =

UN Security Council Resolution 782
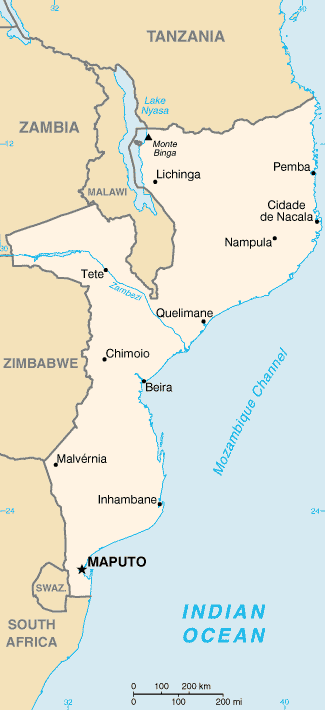
- Mozambique
- Date: 13 October 1992
- Meeting no.: 3,123
- Code: S/RES/782 (Document)
- Subject: Mozambique
- Voting summary: 15 voted for; None voted against; None abstained
- Result: Adopted

Security Council composition
- Permanent members: China; France; Russia; United Kingdom; United States
- Non-permanent members: Austria; Belgium; Cape Verde; Ecuador; Hungary; India; Japan; Morocco; Venezuela; Zimbabwe

United Nations Security Council resolution 782, adopted unanimously on 13 October 1992, after welcoming the Rome General Peace Accords signed on 4 October 1992, in Rome between the FRELIMO (government) and RENAMO (rebel) parties in the Mozambican Civil War, the council approved the appointment of an interim Special Representative and the deployment of up to 25 military observers to Mozambique. The Special Representative was an Italian, Aldo Ajello.

The resolution also welcomed an agreement by the President of Mozambique Joaquim Chissano and the President of RENAMO in which the two sides accepted the role of the United Nations in monitoring and guaranteeing the Rome Accords. It then expressed the council's expectation of a future report by the Secretary-General on the establishment of a United Nations Operation in Mozambique, which was officially established in Resolution 797.

== See also ==
- History of Mozambique
- List of United Nations Security Council Resolutions 701 to 800 (1991–1993)
