= United Nations Security Council Resolution 797 =

UN Security Council Resolution 797
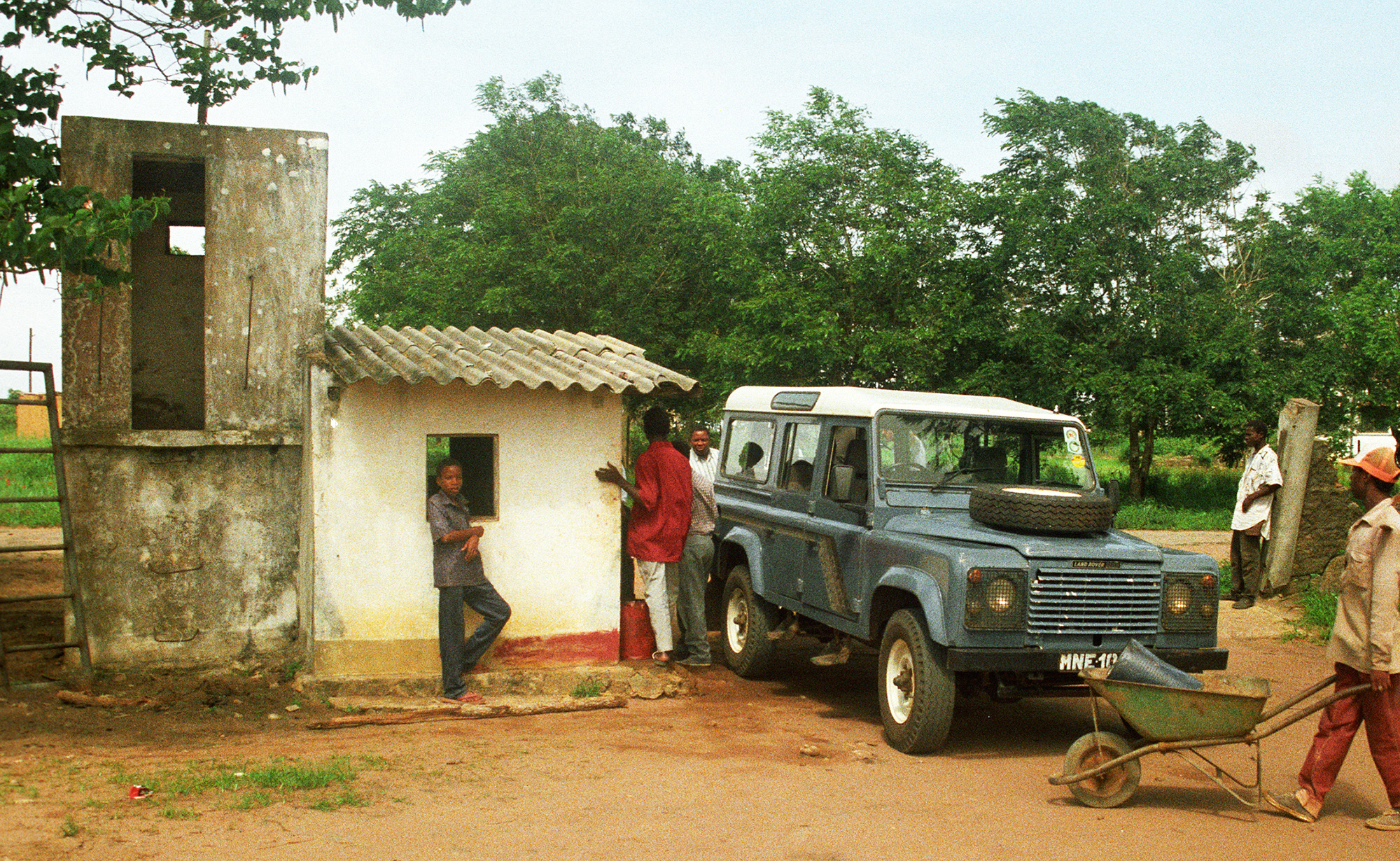
- United Nations vehicle in Mozambique
- Date: 16 December 1992
- Meeting no.: 3,149
- Code: S/RES/797 (Document)
- Subject: Mozambique
- Voting summary: 15 voted for; None voted against; None abstained
- Result: Adopted

Security Council composition
- Permanent members: China; France; Russia; United Kingdom; United States
- Non-permanent members: Austria; Belgium; Cape Verde; Ecuador; Hungary; India; Japan; Morocco; Venezuela; Zimbabwe

United Nations Security Council resolution 797, adopted unanimously on 16 December 1992, after reaffirming Resolution 782 (1992), the Council decided to establish the United Nations Operation in Mozambique (ONUMOZ) as proposed by the Secretary-General Boutros Boutros-Ghali in line with the peace agreement for Mozambique.

The Council requested the Secretary-General in planning and executing the deployment of the Operation to seek economies through phased deployment, with an initial mandate ending on 31 October 1993. It also demanded the Government of Mozambique and RENAMO to co-operate with the Special Representative of the Secretary-General and ONUMOZ, respecting the ceasefire and guaranteeing their safety.

ONUMOZ's mandate was to monitor disarmament, demobilisation, reintegration of the armies and irregular military and monitor the withdrawal of foreign forces. It would also authorise arrangements to protect vital infrastructure, United Nations personnel, election monitors and international operations, and monitor Mozambique's police, reporting human rights abuses. The first members of ONUMOZ arrived in early 1993.

The resolution then invited the Secretary-General to consult closely with all the parties on the precise timing of and preparations for the presidential and legislative elections as well as on a precise timetable for the implementation of the other major aspects of the Agreement, including demobilisation, and to report back to the Council no later than 31 March 1993.

Resolution then requested Member States to contribute personnel, equipment and to activities in support of the peace agreement.

== See also ==
- Elections in Mozambique
- History of Mozambique
- List of United Nations Security Council Resolutions 701 to 800 (1991–1993)
