= Honoris Crux Gold =

South African military decoration for bravery

- Type: Military decoration for bravery
- Awarded for: Outstanding bravery in extreme danger
- Country: South Africa
- Presented by: the State President
- Eligibility: All Ranks
- Post-nominals: HCG
- Campaign: 1966-1989 Border War
- Status: Discontinued in 1992
- Established: 1975
- First award: 1975
- Final award: 1991

Highlights
- Total: 5 and 1 Bar
- Ribbon bar

SADF pre-1994 & SANDF post-2002 orders of wear
- Next (higher): SADF precedence: Castle of Good Hope Decoration; SANDF precedence: Victoria Cross
- Next (lower): SADF succession: Star of South Africa, Gold; SANDF succession: Gold Star for Bravery

The Honoris Crux Gold (Gold Cross of Honour), post-nominal letters HCG, is a South African military decoration for bravery which was instituted in 1975. It was awarded to members of the South African Defence Force for outstanding acts of bravery while in extreme danger. It was the second most senior in a set of four classes of Honoris Crux decorations which replaced the discontinued Honoris Crux of 1952.

== The South African military ==
The Union Defence Forces (UDF) were established in 1912 and renamed the South African Defence Force (SADF) in 1958. On 27 April 1994 it was integrated with six other independent forces into the South African National Defence Force (SANDF).

== Institution ==
The Honoris Crux Gold (Gold Cross of Honour), post-nominal letters HCG, was instituted by the State President on 1 July 1975.

== Award criteria ==
The decoration could be awarded to members of the South African Defence Force for outstanding acts of bravery while in extreme danger. A Bar could be awarded for a further similar deed of bravery. It was the second most senior of a set of four classes of Honoris Crux decorations, the Honoris Crux Diamond, Honoris Crux Gold, Honoris Crux Silver and Honoris Crux, which together replaced the discontinued Honoris Crux of 1952.

== Order of wear ==
The position of the Honoris Crux Gold in the official order of precedence was revised four times after 1975 to accommodate the inclusion or institution of new decorations and medals, first with the discontinuation of the Honoris Crux Diamond (HCD) on 3 September 1993, then upon the integration into the South African National Defence Force on 27 April 1994, again in April 1996 when decorations and medals were belatedly instituted for the two former non-statutory forces, the Azanian People's Liberation Army and Umkhonto we Sizwe, and finally with the institution of a new set of awards on 27 April 2003.

South African Defence Force until 3 September 1993

- Official SADF order of precedence:
  - Preceded by the Honoris Crux Diamond (HCD).
  - Succeeded by the Star of South Africa, Gold (SSA).
- Official national order of precedence:
  - Preceded by the Honoris Crux Diamond (HCD).
  - Succeeded by the Woltemade Decoration for Bravery, Gold.

South African Defence Force until 26 April 1994

- Official SADF order of precedence, after the Honoris Crux Diamond (HCD) had been officially discontinued:
  - Preceded by the Castle of Good Hope Decoration (CGH).
  - Succeeded by the Star of South Africa, Gold (SSA).
- Official national order of precedence:
  - Preceded by the Castle of Good Hope Decoration (CGH).
  - Succeeded by the Woltemade Decoration for Bravery, Gold.

South African National Defence Force from 27 April 1994

- Official SANDF order of precedence, after the Castle of Good Hope Decoration (CGH) had been officially discontinued:
  - Preceded by the Victoria Cross (VC) of the United Kingdom.
  - Succeeded by the Star of South Africa, Gold (SSA) of the Republic of South Africa.
- Official national order of precedence:
  - Preceded by the Victoria Cross (VC) of the United Kingdom.
  - Succeeded by the Woltemade Decoration for Bravery, Gold of the Republic of South Africa.

South African National Defence Force from April 1996

- Official SANDF order of precedence:
  - Preceded by the Victoria Cross (VC) of the United Kingdom.
  - Succeeded by the Gold Star for Bravery (GSB) of the Azanian People's Liberation Army.
- Official national order of precedence:
  - Preceded by the Victoria Cross (VC) of the United Kingdom.
  - Succeeded by the Woltemade Decoration for Bravery, Gold of the Republic of South Africa.

South African National Defence Force from 27 April 2003

- Official SANDF order of precedence:
  - Preceded by the Victoria Cross (VC) of the United Kingdom.
  - Succeeded by the Gold Star for Bravery (GSB) of the Azanian People's Liberation Army.
- Official national order of precedence:
  - Preceded by the Order of Mapungubwe, Platinum (OMP) of the Republic of South Africa.
  - Succeeded by the Woltemade Decoration for Bravery, Gold of the Republic of South Africa.

== Description ==
Obverse

The Honoris Crux Gold is a silver-gilt Maltese cross which fits in a circle 45 millimetres in diameter, with two swords in saltire surmounted by a circular protea wreath, the arms of the cross in green enamel, with a roundel in the centre tierced horizontally in the orange, white and blue bands of the national flag, framed in a double silver circle containing 24 stones. Apart from being silver-gilt instead of silver and having a more ornate ribbon suspender, it is identical to the Honoris Crux Silver in all respects.

Reverse

The reverse has the pre-1994 South African Coat of Arms, with the decoration number underneath.

Bar

The bar is of silver-gilt with a miniature replica of the Maltese cross embossed in the centre. Only one bar was ever made, after the Bar to the HCG was awarded to Captain Arthur Walker HCG. In lieu of the Bar, he was initially presented with a Clasp for 40 years of service to the Permanent Force Good Service Medal, also in silver-gilt, until one was eventually manufactured especially for him in 1991.

Ribbon

The ribbon is 32 millimetres wide and orange, with a single 1 millimetre wide white band in the centre.

== Discontinuation ==
Conferment of the decoration was discontinued in 1992.

== Recipients ==
Since inclusion in the table itself is impractical, the actions cited for follow below the table.

Name	Rank	NS no.	Date of action	Unit	Service Arm	Photo
De Wet, Christoffel Hendrik (Note: De Wet, Christoffel Hendrik – Second Lieutenant De Wet was the first recipient of the Honoris Crux Gold. He was cited for clearing a road of landmines while under enemy fire in Angola.)	2 Lt	001	26 Dec 1975	2nd Fd Eng Rgt, SAEC	SA Army	
Wessels, David Eric (Note: Wessels, David Eric. – Second Lieutenant Wessels was cited for actions in Angola during Operation Savannah at Bridge 14. Wessels crossed the bridge under fire to rescue a wounded FNLA soldier whom he brought back to the South African side in a 10t vehicle he had recovered from the enemy side. He returned later the afternoon to recover a fuel tanker left on the enemy occupied side of the bridge. He was wounded during this action and was covered in fuel from the punctured tanker. He crawled back for 170m under enemy fire and was rescued by own forces and brought back to safety.)	2 Lt	002	28 Dec 1975	2nd Fd Eng Rgt, SAEC	SA Army	
Fernando, Gabriel (Note: Fernando, Gabriel. – Corporal Gabriel was cited for deeds of gallantry on five occasions in 1980.)	Cpl	003	1 Aug 1980	5 Recce Rgt, SAIC	SA Army	
Walker, Arthur (Note: Walker, Arthur – Lieutenant Walker was cited for risking his life during a night operation in Angola, by turning on the lights of his helicopter to draw enemy fire away from another helicopter. Official citation: "During January 1981, two Alouettes, with Lieutenant Walker as flight leader, carried out close air support operations resulting in the Alouettes coming under intense enemy artillery and anti-aircraft fire. He only withdrew when ordered to do so. Later Lieutenant Walker returned to the contact area to provide top cover for a Puma assigned to casualty evacuation. Again he was subject to heavy enemy anti-aircraft fire. During the withdrawal the second helicopter developed difficulties and called for assistance. Yet again Lieutenant Walker returned to provide top cover drawing virtually all the anti-aircraft fire to his Alouette. His courageous act prevented the loss of an Alouette and crew. Lieutenant Walker's actions were not only an outstanding display of professionalism, devotion to duty and courage, but also constitutes exceptional deeds of bravery under enemy fire and make him a worthy recipient of the Honoris Crux Gold.")	Lt	004	15 Jan 1981	AFB Ondangwa	SAAF	
Walker, Arthur HCG (Note: Walker, Arthur HCG. – Captain Walker HCG was cited for the award of the Honoris Crux Diamond, but was awarded the Bar to the HCG instead for landing in enemy territory to search for on foot and rescue the crew of a helicopter which had been shot down. He is the most highly decorated SADF member of the 1966-1989 Border War. Official citation: "During December 1981 Captain Walker was again requested to provide top cover for the evacuation of a seriously wounded soldier. On take-off with the evacuee his number two helicopter was hit and crash-landed. Without hesitation and with total disregard for his personal safety Captain Walker landed near the wrecked helicopter and immediately searched for the crew. Eventually the situation became suicidal compelling Captain Walker and his crew to withdraw. When he was airborne he spotted the missing crew and yet again, without hesitation and despite the fact that virtually all enemy fire was now directed in his direction, he landed and uplifted the crew to safety. Through this courageous deed he prevented the loss of two men. His distinguished actions, devotion to duty and courage make him a credit to the South African Defence Force in general, the South African Air Force in particular and makes him a worthy recipient of the Bar to the Honoris Crux Gold.")	Capt	Bar to HCG	29 Dec 1981	AFB Ondangwa	SAAF	
Whiley, Paul Burger (Note: Whiley, Paul Burger – Able Seaman Whiley was awarded the HCG for his action to search for possibly trapped passengers inside the listing and sinking ship MTS Oceanos off the Transkei Wild Coast on 4 August 1991.)	AB	028	4 Aug 1991	SAS Scorpion	SAN	

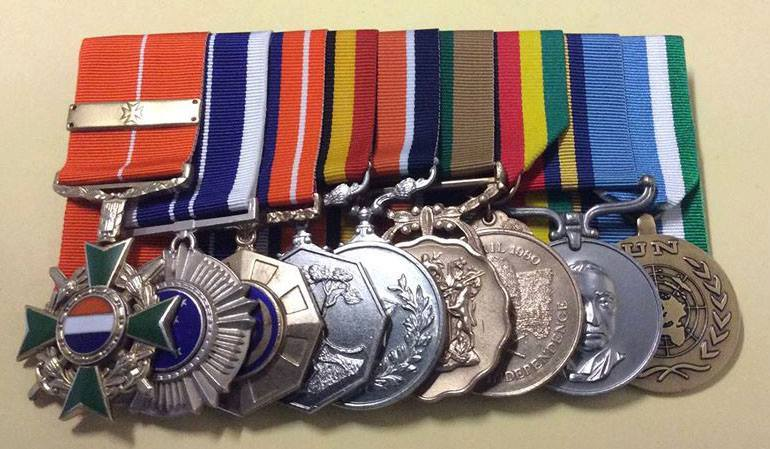
Major Arthur Walker HCG and Bar SM: Honoris Crux Gold and Bar; Southern Cross Medal; Pro Patria Medal; Southern Africa Medal; General Service Medal (South Africa); Good Service Medal, Bronze; Zimbabwean Independence Medal; General Service Medal (Rhodesia); United Nations Medal (ONUMOZ)
