= Pro Virtute Decoration =

Former South African military decoration

- Type: Military decoration for bravery
- Awarded for: Distinguished conduct and exceptional combat leadership in the field
- Country: South Africa
- Presented by: the State President and, from 1994, the President
- Eligibility: Officers
- Post-nominals: PVD
- Campaign: 1966-1989 Border War
- Status: Discontinued in 2003
- Established: 1987
- Ribbon bar

SADF pre-1994 & SANDF post-2002 orders of wear
- Next (higher): SADF precedence: Honoris Crux (1975); SANDF precedence: Nkwe ya Selefera
- Next (lower): SADF succession: Southern Cross Decoration; SANDF succession: Southern Cross Decoration

The Pro Virtute Decoration, post-nominal letters PVD, is a military decoration for bravery which was instituted by the Republic of South Africa in 1987. It was awarded to officers of the South African Defence Force for distinguished conduct and exceptional leadership during combat operations in the field.

== The South African military ==
The Union Defence Forces (UDF) were established in 1912 and renamed the South African Defence Force (SADF) in 1958. On 27 April 1994, it was integrated with six other independent forces into the South African National Defence Force (SANDF).

== Institution ==
The Pro Virtute Decoration, post-nominal letters PVD, was instituted by the State President in 1987. The equivalent award for other ranks was the Pro Virtute Medal.

== Award criteria ==
The decoration could be awarded to officers of the South African Defence Force for distinguished conduct and exceptional leadership during combat operations in the field. A Bar, instituted in 1993, could be awarded for a further similar deed of leadership in combat.

== Order of wear ==
The position of the Pro Virtute Decoration in the official order of precedence was revised three times after 1975, to accommodate the inclusion or institution of new decorations and medals, first with the integration into the South African National Defence Force on 27 April 1994, again in April 1996 when decorations and medals were belatedly instituted for the two former non-statutory forces, the Azanian People's Liberation Army and Umkhonto we Sizwe, and finally with the institution of a new set of awards on 27 April 2003.

South African Defence Force until 26 April 1994

- Official SADF order of precedence:
  - Preceded by the Honoris Crux (1975) (HC).
  - Succeeded by the Southern Cross Decoration (SD).
- Official national order of precedence:
  - Preceded by the Police Cross for Bravery (PCF).
  - Succeeded by the Southern Cross Decoration (SD).

South African National Defence Force from 27 April 1994

- Official SANDF order of precedence:
  - Preceded by the Cross for Bravery of the Republic of Transkei.
  - Succeeded by the Southern Cross Decoration (SD) of the Republic of South Africa.
- Official national order of precedence:
  - Preceded by the Police Cross for Bravery (PCF) of the Republic of South Africa.
  - Succeeded by the Southern Cross Decoration (SD) of the Republic of South Africa.

South African National Defence Force from April 1996

- Official SANDF order of precedence:
  - Preceded by the Star for Bravery in Silver (SBS) of Umkhonto we Sizwe.
  - Succeeded by the Southern Cross Decoration (SD) of the Republic of South Africa.
- Official national order of precedence:
  - Preceded by the Star for Bravery in Silver (SBS) of Umkhonto we Sizwe.
  - Succeeded by the Southern Cross Decoration (SD) of the Republic of South Africa.

South African National Defence Force from 27 April 2003

- Official SANDF order of precedence:
  - Preceded by the Nkwe ya Selefera (NS) of the Republic of South Africa.
  - Succeeded by the Southern Cross Decoration (SD) of the Republic of South Africa.
- Official national order of precedence:
  - Preceded by the Mendi Decoration for Bravery, Silver (MDS) of the Republic of South Africa.
  - Succeeded by the Southern Cross Decoration (SD) of the Republic of South Africa.

== Description ==
Obverse

The Pro Virtute Decoration is a 9 carat gold five-armed Maltese cross, with one arm pointing down, which fits in a circle 45 millimetres in diameter. The arms of the cross are in white enamel, with the pre-1994 South African Coat of Arms on a roundel in red enamel in the centre. Crossed proteas attach the upper two arms of the Maltese cross to the ribbon suspender, which is a bar decorated with leaves.

Reverse

The reverse is undecorated and bears the words "PRO VIRTUTE".

Pro Virtute Decoration and Bar

Bar

The Bar is silver-gilt and has an emblem depicting a Protea embossed in the centre. The same Bar was used to indicate multiple awards of the Pro Virtute Decoration, Southern Cross Decoration, Pro Merito Decoration and Ad Astra Decoration.

Ribbon

The ribbon is 32 millimetres wide, with a 21 millimetres wide orange centre band between two 5½ millimetres wide pale blue bands, and hangs on a rectangular bar-brooch which is, like the suspender bar, decorated with leaves.

== Discontinuation ==
Conferment of the Pro Virtute Decoration was discontinued in respect of services performed on or after 27 April 2003.

Since a situation such as the Battle of Bangui in the Central African Republic from 22 to 24 March 2013 was not foreseen, the decoration was not replaced by a similar honour to distinguish between leadership under fire and leadership under non-operational conditions. This engagement has been described as one of the hardest-fought actions which the South African military have ever experienced, during which two officers displayed exceptional combat leadership to defeat a well-armed force, estimated at between 4,000 and 7,000, with only 200 men.
