= United Nations Operation in Mozambique =

Peace mission, 1992–1994

United Nations Operations in Mozambique
- Abbreviation: ONUMOZ
- Formation: 13 October 1992
- Type: Peacekeeping
- Legal status: Ended 9 December 1994
- Parent organization: United Nations Security Council
- Website: United Nations Operation in Mozambique

The United Nations Operations in Mozambique (ONUMOZ, Portuguese: Operação das Nações Unidas em Moçambique) was a UN peace mission to Mozambique established in December 1992 under Security Council Resolution 797 with the assignment to monitor the implementation of the Rome General Peace Accords agreed upon by the Mozambican president Joaquim Chissano of FRELIMO, the Front for Liberation of Mozambique, and Afonso Dhlakama of RENAMO, the Mozambican National Resistance. The operation was one of the most significant and extensive UN operations and it sought to demobilize and disarm troops, provide humanitarian aid, and oversee the elections. The operation ended in December 1994.

== Background ==
After Mozambique gained its independence from Portugal, Frelimo whose leaders were now in power, sought to rebuild and expand the state's role. Yet this was not an easy task. At the time, there were very few trained Mozambican doctors or teachers, and 95% of the population was illiterate. To help the mission, the Eastern Bloc supplied them with medical staff, teachers, government advisers, and Western volunteers excited to engage in socialist state-building. They thus embarked on a mission to expand the state's social services, education, and hospital systems.

However, in the 1980s, the Mozambican Civil War seriously hindered the mission's efforts. Renamo sought to overthrow Frelimo with the support of external actors. White regimes in Rhodesia and South Africa were the movement's largest donors. After Mozambique gained its independence and Frelimo instituted an African and Marxist government, the white minority rule in Rhodesia could no longer rely on Mozambique for support. Therefore, the Rhodesian Central Intelligence Agency began an operation inside Mozambique with the goal of toppling the Frelimo government. They gathered former soldiers from the colonial army that supported their goal of removing Frelimo from power. Ultimately, this group of soldiers formed Renamo and persuaded many other Mozambicans from rural towns and the countryside to join them. Together, they introduced violence and destruction into the country. They destroyed many schools, roads, and hospitals the socialist state building project had built.

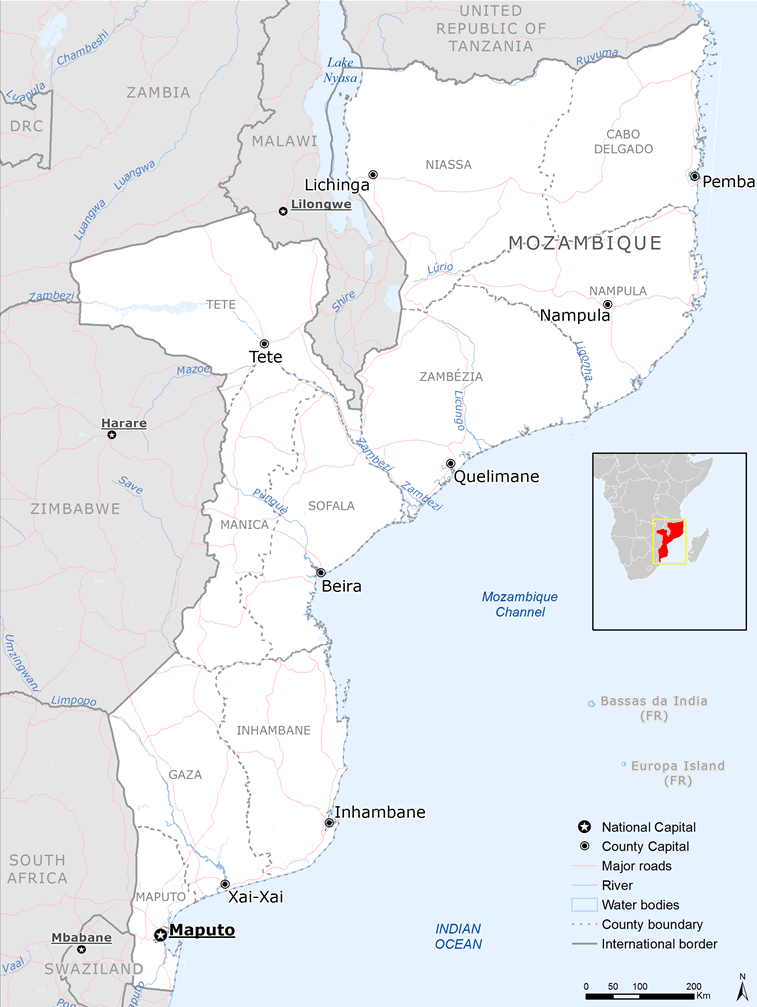
Map of Mozambique

Fighting the Renamo forces left the government, run by Frelimo, with enormous amounts of debt, especially since the Soviet Union was no longer funding them. The government turned to Western donors to escape the dire situation. In 1986 and 1987, they began receiving double the amount of foreign aid, and in 1988, foreign aid comprised 81.2% of their GDP. With the consent of the Mozambican government, the Bretton Woods institution implemented a Structural Adjustment Program. The institution provided debt relief and aid in exchange for a more liberal economy. Frelimo's political ideologies were initially socialist, but privatizing companies, reducing the role of the state, and cutting taxes, were the price they had to pay to save the country.

In addition to creating debt, the Civil War also had a devastating impact on people's lives. Around 1 million Mozambicans died, and 3 million had to flee their homes or move to another country as a result of the war. Medical facilities were no longer functioning, and infant mortality had risen to the second highest in the world: one in three children died before the age of five. Furthermore, severe droughts plagued the country in 1992, and hunger threatened countless lives.

=== The end of the war and the General Peace Agreement ===
In the late 1980s, both Renamo and Frelimo had become uninterested in fighting. The Mozambican government was recovering from debt and no longer wholeheartedly committed to a Marxist–Leninist government framework. Instead of ‘People’s Republic,’ Mozambique was now solely named ‘Republic.’ The government also instituted freedom of speech and separated the judiciary from the government. They were willing to allow for multi-party democracy and to give up total control of the state. As for Renamo, its funds were depleting. The white rule in Rhodesia ended, and South Africa began to transition toward majority rule in the 1990s. Thus, Renamo lost both of its supporters. Renamo's internal support was also waning as they were partially responsible for the ongoing famine. They had destroyed most of the country's infrastructure, which led the drought to have a greater impact on the country. Frelimo was also willing to allow Renamo, a place in government, and neither side had the funds to continue the war. Therefore, they decided to sign an agreement declaring a truce.

In July 1990, the two sides first sat down to talk in Rome. An Italian non-governmental organization, the Sant’ Egidio community, and Mario Rafaelli, an Italian politician, helped them write up an agreement. During their first meeting, they agreed only to end the violence in the Beira and Limpopo corridors. However, in later talks in July 1991 and October 1992, both sides agreed to demobilize before the parliamentary and presidential elections. On October 4, 1992, President Chissano, leader of Frelimo, and Afonso Dhlakama, leader of Renamo, signed the General Peace Agreement. As requested by both parties, The United Nations became responsible for ensuring that both sides would remain committed to the General Peace Agreement and that all soldiers would demobilize and disarm before the parliamentary and presidential elections.

Mozambique's government requested that the UN begin the operation immediately after the General Peace Agreement was signed, but the UN was only able to come up with a plan three months later. The parties continued to violate the cease-fire agreement making it impossible for the UN to deliver humanitarian aid. Finally, in December 1992, the UN Secretary-General Boutros-Ghali put forth a plan. The plan was composed of four components: political, military, humanitarian, and electoral. The political component had no specific goals other than overseeing that the operation ran smoothly. The military component directly aimed to promote peace, demobilize and disarm troops, and create a new national army. The humanitarian component assisted refugees and Mozambicans suffering from hunger, while the electoral component oversaw the upcoming elections.

== Mandate ==
ONUMOZ' mandate was:

- To monitor and verify the ceasefire, the separation and concentration of forces, their demobilization and the collection, storage and destruction of weapons;
- To monitor and verify the complete withdrawal of foreign forces and to provide security in the transport corridors;
- To monitor and verify the disbanding of private and irregular armed groups;
- To authorize security arrangements for vital infrastructures and to provide security for United Nations and other international activities in support of the peace process;
- To provide technical assistance and monitor the entire electoral process;
- To coordinate and monitor humanitarian assistance operations, in particular those relating to refugees, internally displaced persons, demobilized military personnel and the affected local population.

== Military ==
The military division was in charge of demobilizing active Frelimo and Renamo troops and aimed to do it before the elections. This was a top priority for the mission to ensure long lasting peace.

Demobilization was set to begin in March 1993, but several issues arose between June and September 1993 that stalled the process. Dhlakama declared that he did not think demobilization had to be achieved before the elections. Furthermore, Dhlakama insisted that its troops must wait to demobilize in order to avoid a Frelimo coup. If Renamo troops began to demobilize, they would become militarily vulnerable, and Frelimo would take advantage of the situation to regain complete control. Dhlakama thus requested that 65% of the UN troops be present in the country before he began demobilizing Renamo troops. Additionally, neither side was collaborating with the UN to provide inaccurate lists of troops, weapons, and base.

The UN dealt with such issues by posing threats to both sides. On a visit to Mozambique, Secretary General Boutros-Ghali said that if they continued to refuse to follow through with the plan to demobilize, the UN would withdraw its support. Aldo Ajello, the Interim Special Representative for Mozambique, also convinced Dhlakama to demobilize by telling him that all of the UN's funds would be directed to the government if he did not comply. Boutros-Ghali and Ajello's actions were successful, and the government and Dhlakama shared their final troop assembly location lists. The UN program ultimately demobilized 67,042 government troops and 24,648 Renamo troops.

=== The challenge of creating a national army ===
There were also significant challenges to creating the new Mozambican army, The Defence Forces of Mozambique, FADM. The Technical Unit and Reintegration Support Scheme, part of the UN, were in charge of transitioning soldiers out of their former position and into society. Their tasks included registering soldiers, creating documents, and giving them basic survival needs. Once demobilized, they were paid for the next eighteen months, and UNOHAC assisted them with finding new jobs. Such steps were intended to facilitate soldiers’ integration into society but ultimately delayed creating a national army since it was more beneficial for soldiers to demobilize. The due date for the lists of soldiers for the national army had been set for September 1994, yet only 10,000 soldiers were recruited at that point. In the end, there were 12,000 soldiers in the new army, but they initially expected 30,000 soldiers in total.

== Humanitarian assistance ==
According to the UN, humanitarian assistance was vital to maintaining peace between the two parties. UNOHAC, the Office of Humanitarian Aid Co-ordination, focused on reintegrating Mozambicans refugees and former Frelimo and Renamo soldiers who had demobilized back into society.

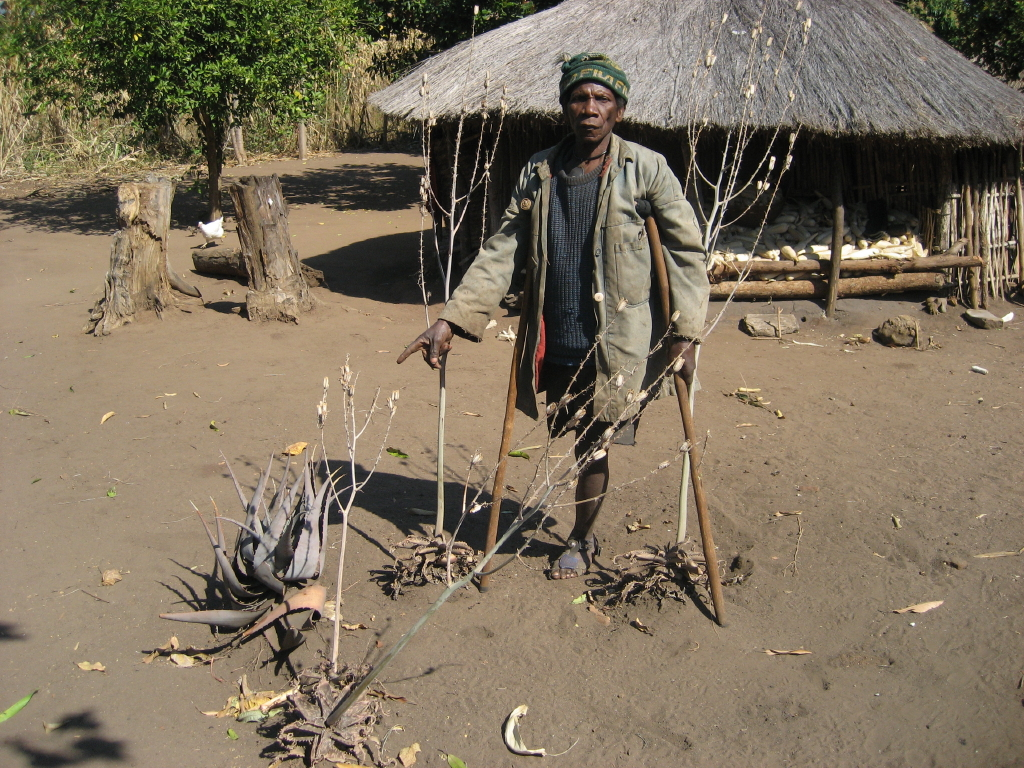
Pita Roque, Mozambican land mine victim

Once the GPA was signed, many Mozambicans living outside of the country or internally displaced began to return. The UNHCR assisted with preparing the country to receive the influx of people by repairing roads, health facilities, schools, and food production mechanisms. One challenge to the UN's operation was the presence of land mines scattered across the country. In order to properly welcome Mozambicans back into the country, the UN began a demining operation. Although the program initially faced bureaucratic hurdles and worked slowly, it eventually created a Mine Clearance Training Centre and cleared 5,790 kilometres of roads. By the time of the elections in October 1994 elections, 3 million internal displaced persons, 1.1 million refugees, and 200,000 ex-combatants were back in Mozambique.

=== The role of NGOs ===
NGOs played an essential role in the humanitarian assistance branch of the UN mission. Of the 663 million US dollars that UNOHAC received, 180.2 million US dollars were directed to NGOs, and more funds were distributed to NGOs from agencies other than the UN. Different from government agencies, NGOs were politically neutral and could thus access more areas of the country. Furthermore, many donors preferred to fund NGOs to distribute food and revitalize the country's education and hospital systems since the government relief agency, DPCCN, was accused of corruption.

NGOs were responsible for delivering food to Renamo-controlled areas. In such areas, international NGOs such as The World Food Programme and European Union, and one national NGO, The Mozambican Red Cross, were the only organizations allowed to enter. In May 1993, 3.8 million people received food aid; 500,000 resided in Renamo-controlled areas. Therefore, NGOs became responsible for delivering food to such restricted areas. By October 1994, 35 NGOs had delivered 116,000 tons of food to Renamo-controlled areas in 75 districts. NGOs were initially supposed to deliver 60% of the food, and the government relief agency, DPCCN, was to distribute 40%. However, since NGOs could access Renamo-controlled areas and had more funds, they ended up distributing 80% of the food.

In addition to distributing food, NGOs funded the country's overall development. They directed 25 million US dollars toward multi-sectoral rural projects, 33 US million dollars toward agriculture, 4.1 US million dollars for education, 9.7 US million for water, and 20 US million for health. They fixed roads, bridges, schools, and hospitals.

== Electoral ==
The last aspect of the UN intervention was monitoring the elections. The United Nations Development Programme hired 2,350 observers both foreigners and locals to implement the goal of free and fair elections. They began a civic education campaign where they televised videos explaining the electoral process and convincing people to vote. Furthermore, the UNDP issued photo-identity cards, and ultimately registered 6,363,311 voters, about 81% of the population of eligible voters.

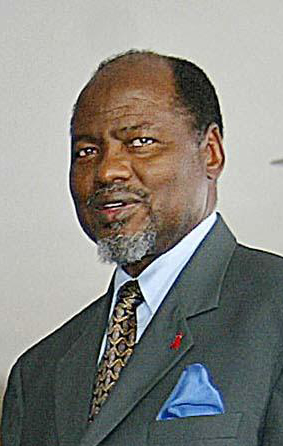
President Joaquim Chissano

For the first time in their history, Mozambicans elected parliamentary members and a president to represent them. In parliament, Frelimo got 129 seats, Renamo got 112, and the Democratic Union got 9 seats out of 250 seats. The Democratic Union was the only third party to get enough votes to be part of parliament. As for president, Chissano won with 53% of the vote and Dhlakama lost with 33% of the vote.

After losing, Dhlakama claimed the elections were frauded. He insisted that members of Frelimo had influenced the results and that certain voters were impeded from voting. However, the National Election Committee insisted that elections were free and fair and the outcome was ultimately accepted. This led the UN to declare its mission complete.

== The outcome of the intervention ==
Officially, the UN intervention came to a close and many considered it to be a largely successful operation for its breadth and depth. Some argue that what made it successful was that both Frelimo and Renamo were willing, for the most part, to comply with UN's demands, end the war, and transition to a multi-party democracy. Others emphasize that the success of this mission can be attributed to UN officials' flexibility and first-hand learning. While elections were set to happen in 1993, they pushed them back to 1994 since they knew holding elections a year earlier when all troops had not been demobilized would have been disastrous. Officials were responding directly to what was happening on the ground and updating their plans regularly to accommodate changes in the field.

== Source cited ==
- United Nations: ONUMOZ Mission
