= South African honours system =

The South African honours system consists of orders, decorations, and medals which are conferred on citizens, and others, to recognise a range of services and achievements. The system has developed since 1894.

== Historical development ==
The British honours system became applicable to South Africa as colonial rule was established in the region during the nineteenth century. From the 1870s onwards, colonial politicians and other public figures featured in the semi-annual honours lists, and during colonial wars and the Anglo-Boer War, the colonial military forces received decorations from the British government.

=== 1894 to 1952 ===
From 1894, the colonial governments were allowed to award military long service medals themselves. This system continued after the colonies became the Union of South Africa in 1910, and after World War I the Union government extended it to create entirely new medals, for Anglo-Boer War veterans (in 1920), the prisons department (in 1922), the police (in 1923), and the railways police (in 1934).

Between 1937 and 1952, King George VI, as the Union's head of state, instituted several civil and military decorations and medals for the Union, including the King's Medal for Bravery. During World War II, British military decorations were again awarded to the South African forces.

=== 1952 to 2002 ===
In 1952, to mark the 300th anniversary of European settlement, the South African government established its own honours system. It consisted of the existing civil, police, railways police and prisons medals, and a new series of military decorations. They were given precedence over British honours.

The honours system was enlarged during the 1960s, after South African had become a republic. New decorations were instituted for the police in 1963, for the railways police in 1966, for sports stars in 1967, for the prisons service in 1968, and for civilians in 1970.

Evidently the government was not satisfied, because during the 1970s and 1980s, it virtually re-created the honours system, scrapping most of the existing awards and creating new ones in their place. The number of decorations and medals granted was increased substantially.

New military decorations were introduced in 1975. They were followed by civil defence medals in 1976, additional police decorations in 1979, new prisons service medals and railways police decorations in 1980, and decorations for the intelligence service in 1981.

During this period too, the ten African homelands inside South Africa were granted self-government or, in four cases, independence. Each of them had its own decorations and medals quite separate from the mainstream honours system. The homelands and their decorations and medals became obsolete when South Africa was reconstituted in 1994.

The existing South African civil, military and police awards were continued after 1994. A series of decorations for the former liberation armies was added in 1996.

=== 2002 onwards ===
A new honours system was inaugurated in 2002, as part of the process of creating new national symbols. It was launched with civilian orders, to which a series of military decorations was added in 2003, a series of police decorations in 2004, a series of intelligence service decorations in 2005, and a series of municipal police decorations in 2008.

A new table of precedence was issued in 2005, to consolidate all the post-1952 South African and homeland awards (more than 300 of them) into a single system.

== Civil honours ==
The British honours system was used in South Africa for many decades, and South Africans featured regularly in the semi-annual British honours lists. South Africans also received British civilian decorations for bravery. The nationalist government stopped the conferment of titles and orders in 1925, and discontinued nominations for bravery awards after the Union's independence was recognised in 1931. It established its own bravery award a few years later, the principal award being the King's/Queen's Medal for Bravery (1939–61).

When South Africa established its own independent honours system in 1952, the Queen's Medal for Bravery was transferred to it. The medal issued to mark Queen Elizabeth II's coronation in 1953 was also ranked as a South African award, because she was Queen of South Africa as well as of the United Kingdom and her other realms and territories.

During the 1960s and 1970s, after South Africa had become a republic, the government developed a small range of civil honours to recognise bravery and meritorious service. The most important awards were the Woltemade Decoration for Bravery (1970–88) and the Decoration for Meritorious Service (DMS) (1970–86).

The civil honours system was enlarged during the 1980s. A series of five national orders was established in 1986, and a Chancery of Orders was established in the Office of the State President (now 'the Presidency') to administer them. The most important order was the Order of the Southern Cross (1986–2002).

The old South African honours were retained for a few years after the Republic was reconstituted as a fully representative democratic state in 1994. A new series of national orders was introduced in 2002, as part of the process of creating new national symbols, the senior order being the Order of Mapungubwe.

== Military decorations and medals ==
The colonial military forces received British military decorations in wartime. From 1894, the colonial governments awarded medals for distinguished conduct and for long service. This was the general practice in the British Empire at that time.

This system was continued by the Union Defence Forces, which replaced the colonial forces in 1912. British decorations for gallantry and distinguished service, including the Victoria Cross, were awarded during World War I and World War II.

In 1920, the government established a special series of awards for veterans who had fought in the Boer forces during the 1899–1902 Anglo-Boer War.

South Africa introduced its own honours system in 1952. Its largest component was a series of military decorations and medals, which not only replaced the existing long service medals, but provided substitutes for the decorations which the British government had awarded in wartime. The highest award was the Castle of Good Hope Decoration (1952–2003), which was the equivalent of the Victoria Cross.

A new system of awards was introduced in 1975. It retained seven of the existing decorations and medals. Innovations included a hierarchy of merit awards, cumulative long service medals, and colour-coded ribbons. As the South African Defence Force was engaged in military operations in South West Africa and Angola throughout the 1970s and 1980s, the number of awards granted each year increased significantly. Additional decorations were instituted between 1987 and 1991.

These awards were continued by the South African National Defence Force. which was established when South Africa was reconstituted in 1994. In 1996, following the precedent set in 1920, decorations and medals were established for veterans of the Azanian People's Liberation Army and Umkhonto we Sizwe who had fought in the liberation struggle between 1961 and 1994.

The current series of military decorations and medals was established in 2003. It is considerably smaller than the previous system, consisting of three decorations for bravery – the Nkwe ya Gauta (NG) being the highest – three for meritorious service, a campaign medal, a long service medal, and two emblems.

== Police decorations and medals ==
South African policemen were eligible for the British King's Police Medal from 1909 to 1933. Since 1923, South Africa has awarded its own police decorations and medals.

Until 1986, there were two police forces : the South African Police and the South African Railways Police Force. Both were eligible for the King's Police Medal (and for the South African version of the medal, which was instituted in 1937), and each had a long service medal which doubled as a decoration for bravery.

After South Africa became a republic in 1961, the government instituted an entirely new series of decorations and medals for the SAP. It was added to several times over the years, and eventually consisted of decorations for bravery, for distinguished leadership, and for outstanding service; a campaign medal; and long service medals. A similar series of decorations was established for the railways police in 1966.

In 1994, the SAP amalgamated with the police forces of the former homelands inside South Africa, to form the SA Police Service. The SAPS continued to use the SAP decorations and medals until they were replaced by the current series of awards in 2004. This comprises two decorations for bravery, three for meritorious service, and four long service medals. There are also commemorative medals, and a decoration for police dogs and horses.

A corresponding series of decorations and medals was established for municipal and metropolitan police forces in 2008.

== Prisons service decorations and medals ==
From 1922 to 1996, South Africa awarded decorations and medals to members of the prisons services.

At first (1922–68), there was only one medal, which could be granted for long service or for bravery. From 1968 to 1980, there were three awards : a decoration for bravery, a medal for meritorious service, and a medal for long service.

From 1980 to 1996, the prisons service had a military-type system of awards, consisting of two decorations for bravery, six for meritorious service, and three for long service. Decorations and medals were discontinued when the department discontinued its military culture in 1996.

== Intelligence service decorations and medals ==
Since 1981, South Africa has awarded decorations and medals to members of its official intelligence services. There have been two series of awards.

The first, used from 1981 to 1994, was for the National Intelligence Service and its associates. Awards consisted of two decorations for bravery, five for meritorious service by NIS personnel, three for meritorious service by members of foreign intelligence services, two for meritorious service by civilians, and three long service medals.

The current series, introduced for the National Intelligence Agency and the South African Secret Service in 2005, consists of a decoration for bravery, four for meritorious service, and three medals for long service.

== See also ==
- South African civil honours
- South African intelligence service decorations
- South African military decorations
- South African police decorations
- South African prisons decorations
- British and Commonwealth orders and decorations
- Transkeian honours system
