= Woltemade Cross for Bravery, Silver =

- Type: Civil decoration for bravery
- Awarded for: Acts of exceptional bravery
- Country: South Africa
- Presented by: the State President
- Eligibility: South African citizens and others
- Post-nominals: WDS
- Status: Discontinued in 2002
- Established: 1988
- Ribbon bar

Pre-1994 & post-2002 orders of wear
- Next (higher): Pre-1994 precedence: National Intelligence Service Cross for Valour, Gold; Post-2002 precedence: National Intelligence Service Cross for Valour, Gold
- Next (lower): Pre-1994 succession: King's/Queen's Police Medal for Gallantry or Distinguished Service; Post-2002 succession: King's/Queen's Police Medal for Gallantry or Distinguished Service

The Woltemade Cross for Bravery, Silver, post-nominal letters WDS, is the lesser of two classes of a South African civil decoration for acts of bravery. It replaced the Union of South Africa King's Medal for Bravery, Silver, Union of South Africa Queen's Medal for Bravery, Silver and Woltemade Decoration for Bravery, Silver, all of which ranked on par with each other and the award of which had been discontinued in 1952, 1961 and 1988 respectively.

== Institution ==
The Woltemade Cross for Bravery, Silver, post-nominal letters WDS, was instituted by Warrant of 16 September 1988, published in Government Gazette no. 11519 dated 30 September 1988.

It is the lesser of two classes of South Africa's highest civilian decoration for bravery and it replaced the Woltemade Decoration for Bravery, Silver.

The cross was named in memory of Wolraad Woltemade, an elderly servant of the Dutch East India Company, who gave his life while rescuing shipwrecked sailors in Table Bay on 1 June 1773. The ship De Jonge Thomas broke anchor in a gale force Northwestern and was driven ashore in the Salt River Mouth. Woltemade rode his horse into the sea seven times and brought surviving sailors ashore each time, but on the eighth excursion Woltemade and his exhausted horse were overladen by panic-stricken sailors and drowned.

== Award criteria ==
The Woltemade Cross for Bravery, Silver could be awarded to South African citizens who have distinguished themselves by exceptional bravery, by placing their own lives in great danger whilst trying to save the life of another person, or by saving or protecting property belonging to the state, within or beyond the borders of the Republic of South Africa. The cross could also be awarded to non-citizens who have distinguished themselves in this manner, by placing their own lives in great danger whilst trying to save the life of a South Africa citizen, or by saving or protecting property belonging to the state, within or beyond the borders of the Republic of South Africa.

== Order of wear ==
The position of the Woltemade Cross for Bravery, Silver in the official national order of precedence was revised three times after 1990 to accommodate the inclusion or institution of new decorations and medals, first with the integration process of 1994, again when decorations and medals were belatedly instituted in April 1996 for the two former non-statutory para-military forces, the Azanian People's Liberation Army and Umkhonto we Sizwe, and again with the institution of new sets of awards in 2002 and 2003, but it remained unchanged on all three occasions.

- Preceded by the National Intelligence Service Cross for Valour, Gold (CV).
- Succeeded by the King's/Queen's Police Medal for Gallantry or Distinguished Service (KPM/QPM).

== Description ==
The Woltemade Cross for Bravery, Silver is a breast decoration and consists of the cross, a silver rosette and, for evening dress, a miniature cross identical to the obverse design of the breast badge. The rosette would be worn on the left lapel of a jacket or as a brooch by ladies. When worn on uniform, the rosette would be attached to the ribbon bar.

The Cross is struck in silver and is 38 millimetres in diameter. It is in the form of a cross potent with a centre roundel bearing, in relief, a representation of Wolraad Woltemade on his horse saving a man from the sea.

The reverse of the full-size decoration has the embellished South African Coat of Arms and the engraved serial number of the cross. The reverse of the miniature decoration is smooth and impressed with a silver hallmark.

The ribbon is 32 millimetres wide and dark blue with 4 millimetres wide orange edges. Since the same ribbon is used for the Woltemade Cross for Bravery, Gold, the silver rosette would be worn on the ribbon bar when ribbons alone are worn.

A bar, struck in silver and decorated with laurel leaves, could be awarded to denote a subsequent award.

== Recipients ==
Altogether 39 decorations were awarded. The first recipient, in 1988, was Erasmus Hattingh.

== Discontinuation ==
The Woltemade Cross for Bravery, Silver was discontinued in 2002 and was replaced by the Mendi Decoration for Bravery, Silver (OMBS) during the following year.
