= List of medals for bravery =

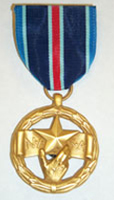
NASA Exceptional Bravery Medal

This list of medals for bravery is an index to articles about notable medals awarded for bravery or valor. These medals, usually associated with military forces, police forces, or other public safety entities, are given to personnel who have served with gallantry, often for those who have engaged in specific acts of bravery or valor.

== Bravery Medal ==
As a formal name in English, "Bravery Medal" may refer to:

- The Australian Bravery Medal
- The New Zealand Bravery Medal
- The Fiji Bravery Medal

== Medal of Bravery or Medal of Valor ==
Several English-speaking nations have a medal called the "Medal of Bravery" or the "Medal of Valor", including Canada and Tanzania. The three Canadian Bravery Decorations were created in 1972, to recognize people who risked their lives to try to save or protect the lives of others: the Cross of Valour (C.V.) recognizes acts of the most conspicuous courage in circumstances of extreme peril; the Star of Courage (S.C.) recognizes acts of conspicuous courage in circumstances of great peril; and the Medal of Bravery (M.B.) recognizes acts of bravery in hazardous circumstances. Non-English speaking nations which have or had a medal usually translated into English as "Bravery Medal" or "Medal of Bravery" include:

- Albania – Medalja e Trimërisë (1945–1982)
- Austrian Empire and Austria-Hungary – Tapferkeitsmedaille or Medal for Bravery (Austria-Hungary), awarded from (19 July 1789–1918)
- Bangladesh – Bir Sreshtha, Bir Uttam, Bir Bikram, Bir Protik (Only awarded for ultimate bravery in The 1971 Liberation War)
- Belgium – Médaille pour acte de courage, de dévouement et d'humanité
- Bosnia and Herzegovina – Republika Srpska – Medal for Bravery, named after Gavrilo Princip
- China – Hong Kong:
  - Medal for Bravery (Gold) (1997–)
  - Medal for Bravery (Silver) (1997–)
  - Medal for Bravery (Bronze) (1997–)
- Czechoslovakia – Československá medaile Za chrabrost před nepřítelem" (Czechoslovak Medal for Bravery Before the Enemy) (1940–)
- German states:
  - Bavaria – officially the Militär-Verdienst Medaille (Military Merit Medal), but commonly referred to as the Tapferkeitsmedaille (1794–1918)
  - Saxe-Altenburg – Tapferkeitsmedaille (1915–1918)
- Hungary – Vitézségi Érem (1922–1944)
- Iran – Medal for Bravery
- Iraq – Nut al-Shujat
- Ireland – Comhairle na Míre Gaile
- India:
  - Param Vir Chakra (wartime)
  - Ashoka Chakra (peacetime)
- Montenegro – Медаља за храброст (1841–1918)
- Poland – Cross of Valour (Krzyż Walecznych) (1920-)
- Russia – За отвагу (Medal for Bravery) (1938-)
- Saudi Arabia – Nut al-Shaja'at
- Serbia:
  - Medalja za hrabrost (1913–1918; 1990–)
  - Medal for Bravery (1912)
- South Africa:
  - Union of South Africa King's Medal for Bravery, Gold (1939–1952)
  - Union of South Africa King's Medal for Bravery, Silver (1939–1952)
  - Union of South Africa Queen's Medal for Bravery, Gold (1952–1961)
  - Union of South Africa Queen's Medal for Bravery, Silver (1952–1961)
- Sweden:
  - För tapperhet i fält (For Valour in the Field) andFör tapperhet till sjöss (For Valour at Sea) awarded in silver from 28 May 1789 to soldiers, seamen and non-commissioned officers.
  - From 1806 supplemented by medals in gold for officers.
- Thailand – เหรียญกล้าหาญ (The Bravery Medal) (1941-)
- United Arab Emirates – Nut al-Shaja'at
- Yugoslavia (Kingdom) – Medalja za hrabrost (1918–1941)
- Yugoslavia (SFRY) – Medalja za hrabrost (1943–1991)

== Medal of Valor ==
There are a number of other decorations of various countries which are customarily translated into English using other synonyms for bravery, but are occasionally translated as "bravery". These include the Soviet Medal "for Valor" and the Israeli Medal of Valor. Medals specifically including "valor" include:

Country	Award	Description
United States	9/11 Heroes Medal of Valor	Awarded by the government of the United States, created specifically to honor the public safety officers who were killed in the line of duty during the September 11 terrorist attacks in 2001 at the World Trade Center and The Pentagon
Germany	Bundeswehr Cross of Honour for Valour	The highest class of the Bundeswehr Cross of Honour awarded for "...an act of gallantry in the face of exceptional danger to life and limb whilst demonstrating staying power and serenity in order to fulfil the military mission in an ethically sound way."
United States	FBI Medal of Valor	Presented by the Federal Bureau of Investigation in recognition of an exceptional act of heroism or voluntary risk of personal safety and life
Italy	Gold Medal of Military Valour	Established on 21 May 1793 by King Victor Amadeus III of Sardinia
United States	Los Angeles Police Medal of Valor	The highest law enforcement medal given by the Los Angeles Police Department
United States	Maryland Medal for Valor	Awarded to members of the Maryland National Guard in recognition of acts of personal heroism
Canada	Medal of Military Valour	Canada's third highest award for military valor
United States	Medal of Valor (Civil Air Patrol)	A decoration that may be awarded to a member of the Civil Air Patrol, the official civilian auxiliary of the United States Air Force
Israel	Medal of Valor	An Israeli Military decoration
United States	New York City Police Department Medal for Valor	Conferred upon New York City police officers for acts of outstanding personal bravery
Philippines	Philippine Medal of Valor	The highest military award given by the Armed Forces of the Philippines
Singapore	Pingat Keberanian	Singaporean Medal of Valor, awarded for an act of courage and gallantry in circumstances of personal danger
United States	Public Safety Officer Medal of Valor	Awarded to American police officers, firefighters and other emergency services personnel by the United States Department of Justice
Italy	Silver Medal of Military Valor	An Italian medal established in 1833 by King Charles Albert of Sardinia
United States	Texas Medal of Valor	Awarded to members of the state military forces by the Governor of Texas for acts of personal heroism
Uzbekistan	Medal of Valor	Awarded to civilians and service members by the President of Uzbekistan for demonstrations of courage, professionality, and loyalty to Uzbekistan.

== See also ==
- Category:Courage awards
- Cross of Valour
- Star of Military Valour
- Lists of awards
- List of military decorations
- List of law enforcement awards and honors
