= Woltemade Cross for Bravery, Gold =

South African civil award (1988–2002)

- Type: Civil decoration for bravery
- Awarded for: Acts of outstanding bravery
- Country: South Africa
- Presented by: the president of South Africa
- Eligibility: South African citizens and others
- Post-nominals: WD
- Status: Discontinued in 2002
- Established: 1988
- Ribbon bar

Orders of wear
- Next (higher): Union of South Africa King's Medal for Bravery, Gold; Union of South Africa Queen's Medal for Bravery, Gold; Woltemade Decoration for Bravery, Gold
- Next (lower): Pre-1994 succession: Order of the Southern Cross, Class I, Gold; Post-2002 succession: Gold Star for Bravery

The Woltemade Cross for Bravery, Gold, post-nominal letters WD, is the senior of two classes of a South African civil decoration for acts of bravery. It replaced the Union of South Africa King's Medal for Bravery, Gold, Union of South Africa Queen's Medal for Bravery, Gold and Woltemade Decoration for Bravery, Gold, all of equal rank and the award of which had been discontinued in 1952, 1961 and 1988 respectively.

== Institution ==
The Woltemade Cross for Bravery, Gold, post-nominal letters WD, was instituted by Warrant of 16 September 1988, published in Government Gazette no. 11519 dated 30 September 1988.

It is the senior of two classes of South Africa's highest civilian decoration for bravery and it replaced the Woltemade Decoration for Bravery, Gold.

The cross was named in memory of Wolraad Woltemade, an elderly servant of the Dutch East India Company, who gave his life while rescuing shipwrecked sailors in Table Bay on 1 June 1773. The ship De Jonge Thomas broke anchor in a gale force Northwestern and was driven ashore in the Salt River Mouth. Woltemade rode his horse into the sea seven times and brought surviving sailors ashore each time, but on the eighth excursion Woltemade and his exhausted horse were overladen by panic-stricken sailors and drowned.

== Award criteria ==
The Woltemade Cross for Bravery, Gold could be awarded to South African citizens who have distinguished themselves by outstanding bravery, by placing their own lives in great danger whilst trying to save the life of another person, or by saving or protecting property belonging to the state, within or beyond the borders of the Republic of South Africa. The cross could also be awarded to non-citizens who have distinguished themselves in this manner, by placing their own lives in great danger whilst trying to save the life of a South Africa citizen, or by saving or protecting property belonging to the state, within or beyond the borders of the Republic of South Africa.

== Order of wear ==
The position of the Woltemade Cross for Bravery, Gold in the official national order of precedence was revised three times after 1990 to accommodate the inclusion or institution of new decorations and medals, first with the integration process of 1994, again when decorations and medals were belatedly instituted in April 1996 for the two former non-statutory para-military forces, the Azanian People's Liberation Army and Umkhonto we Sizwe, and again with the institution of new sets of awards in 2002 and 2003. The position of the cross only changed in 1996.

Official national order of precedence until April 1996

- Preceded by the Union of South Africa King's Medal for Bravery, Gold, the Union of South Africa Queen's Medal for Bravery, Gold and the Woltemade Decoration for Bravery, Gold.
- Succeeded by the Order of the Southern Cross, Class I, Gold.

Official national order of precedence from April 1996

- Preceded by the Union of South Africa King's Medal for Bravery, Gold, the Union of South Africa Queen's Medal for Bravery, Gold and the Woltemade Decoration for Bravery, Gold.
- Succeeded by the Gold Star for Bravery of the Azanian People's Liberation Army.

== Description ==
The Woltemade Cross for Bravery, Gold is a neck decoration and consists of the convex cross, a gold rosette and, for evening dress, a miniature cross identical to the obverse design of the neck badge. The neck badge would be worn pendent from the ribbon around the neck. The rosette would be worn on the left lapel of a jacket or as a brooch by ladies. When worn on uniform, the rosette would be attached to the ribbon bar.

The Cross is silver-gilt and is 38 millimetres (1.5 in) in diameter. It is struck in the form of a cross potent with a centre roundel bearing, in relief, a representation of Wolraad Woltemade on his horse saving a man from the sea.

The reverse has the embellished South African Coat of Arms and the engraved serial number of the cross.

The ribbon is 32 mm (1.3 in) wide and dark blue with 4 mm-wide (0.16 in) orange edges. Since the same ribbon is used for the Woltemade Cross for Bravery, Silver, the gold rosette would be worn on the ribbon bar when ribbons alone are worn.

A bar, struck in gold and decorated with laurel leaves, could be awarded to denote a subsequent award.

== Recipients ==
Altogether 27 decorations were awarded. The first recipient, in 1988, was Hendrik Boshoff who had rescued someone from the jaws of a leopard. In 1989, some of the survivors of the Westdene dam disaster were awarded for their heroic attempts at saving their classmates. Pieter Koen was the only one of the group awarded posthumously, for he had drowned during their rescuing efforts.

== Discontinuation ==
The Woltemade Cross for Bravery, Gold was discontinued in 2002 and was replaced by the Mendi Decoration for Bravery, Gold (OMBG) during the following year.
