= Woltemade Decoration for Bravery, Gold =

- Bowed silver decoration depicted
- Type: Civil decoration for bravery
- Awarded for: Acts of conspicuous bravery
- Country: South Africa
- Presented by: the State President
- Eligibility: South African citizens and others
- Status: Discontinued in 1988
- Established: 1970
- Ribbon bar

Pre-1994 & post-2002 orders of wear
- Next (higher): Pre-1994 precedence: Honoris Crux Gold; Post-2002 precedence: Honoris Crux Gold
- Equivalent: Union of South Africa King's Medal for Bravery, Gold; Union of South Africa Queen's Medal for Bravery, Gold
- Next (lower): Pre-1994 succession: Woltemade Cross for Bravery, Gold; Post-2002 succession: Woltemade Cross for Bravery, Gold

The Woltemade Decoration for Bravery, Gold is the senior of two classes of a South African civil decoration for acts of bravery. It replaced the Union of South Africa King's Medal for Bravery, Gold and Union of South Africa Queen's Medal for Bravery, Gold, the award of which had been discontinued in 1952 and 1961 respectively.

== Institution ==
The Woltemade Decoration for Bravery, Gold was instituted by Warrant of 20 May 1970, published in the South African Government Gazette no. 2718 dated 29 May 1970. The Warrant was amended twice, on 11 November 1971 and 30 May 1973.

It is the senior of two classes of South Africa's highest civilian decoration for bravery and it replaced and ranked on par with the King's and Queen's Medals for Bravery, Gold, the award of which was discontinued, respectively, upon the accession to the British Throne of Queen Elizabeth II in 1952 and upon the establishment of the Republic of South Africa in 1961.

The decoration was named in memory of Wolraad Woltemade, an elderly servant of the Dutch East India Company, who gave his life while rescuing shipwrecked sailors in Table Bay on 1 June 1773. The ship De Jonge Thomas broke anchor in a gale force Northwestern and was driven ashore in the Salt River Mouth. Woltemade rode his horse into the sea seven times and brought surviving sailors ashore each time, but on the eighth excursion Woltemade and his exhausted horse were overladen by panic-stricken sailors and drowned.

== Award criteria ==
The Woltemade Decoration for Bravery, Gold could be awarded to South African citizens who performed acts of conspicuous bravery within or beyond the borders of the Republic of South Africa, and also to non-citizens who had distinguished themselves in this manner in the Republic or in territories belonging to or administered by the Republic, or who elsewhere and in the face of extreme danger had saved the lives of South African citizens or protected property belonging to the Republic, or endeavoured to do so.

The decoration was, like the earlier King's and Queen's Medals for Bravery, Gold, mainly intended for civilians and its award to members of the uniformed services was restricted to acts of gallantry for which the decorations of the services are not normally awarded.

== Order of wear ==
The position of the Woltemade Decoration for Bravery, Gold in the official national order of precedence was revised three times after 1990 to accommodate the inclusion or institution of new decorations and medals, first with the integration process of 1994, again when decorations and medals were belatedly instituted in April 1996 for the two former non-statutory para-military forces, the Azanian People's Liberation Army and Umkhonto we Sizwe, and again with the institution of new sets of awards in 2002 and 2003, but it remained unchanged on all three occasions.

- Preceded by the Honoris Crux Gold (HCG).
- On par with the Union of South Africa King's Medal for Bravery, Gold and Union of South Africa Queen's Medal for Bravery, Gold.
- Succeeded by the Woltemade Cross for Bravery, Gold (WD).

== Description ==
Obverse
The decoration is silver-gilt and is 38 millimetres in diameter with a raised rim and a large ring suspender. The obverse depicts Wolraad Woltemade on his horse in the waves, with the words "FOR BRAVERY • VIR DAPPERHEID" around the perimeter at the top. This was the same design as used on the reverse of the earlier King's and Queen's Medals for Bravery, Gold.

Reverse
The reverse depicts the crest of the South African Coat of Arms, a lion holding four staves to represent the four provinces of the Republic of South Africa. The crest is encircled by a wreath of proteas which is, in turn, encircled by the inscription "REPUBLIEK VAN SUID-AFRIKA" above and "REPUBLIC OF SOUTH AFRICA" below.

Ribbon
The ribbon is 44 millimetres wide and blue with 4 millimetres wide light orange edges. The same ribbon was used for the Woltemade Decoration for Bravery, Silver.

== Recipients ==
Altogether eighteen decorations were awarded.

1984 (1 award)

- Bester, Dirk Uys — saved his family from an armed intruder in their home

1985 (8 awards)

- Koen, Petrus Lucas (aged 17) (posthumously) — died trying to rescue fellow school pupils from the Westdene dam disaster (27 March 1985)
- Du Toit, Daniel Sarel (aged 14) — rescued fellow pupils from the Westdene dam disaster
- Mahner, Alfred — rescued children from the Westdene dam disaster
- Opperman, Gotlieb Rudolf (aged 15) — rescued fellow pupils from the Westdene dam disaster
- Scheepers, Petrus Johannes Joubert — rescued children from the Westdene dam disaster
- Van Rensburg, Johann (posthumously) — died trying to save a girl from drowning at Cape Vidal (19 September 1984)
- Van der Merwe, Michiel Casparus (posthumously) — died trying to save a girl from drowning at Cape Vidal (19 September 1984)
- Louw, Abraham Jacobus (aged 15) — saved his brother from being electrocuted by high-tension cables

1986 (4 awards)

- Brown, Jacobus Johannes (posthumously) — drowned trying to save a man from a flooded drain (28 October 1978)
- Campbell, Gordon Victor (posthumously) — died trying to fight off an armed attacker near White River (9 March 1985)
- Ahlers, Willem Constantyn — fought off an armed attacker near White River (9 March 1985)
- Lloyd, Owen Hugh — saved his son from the jaws of a crocodile in the Zambesi river (May 1986)

1987 (5 awards)

- Darvel, Shaun (aged 17) (posthumously) — died trying to save his brother from drowning (26 December 1986)
- Human, Jacobus Johannes Daniel (posthumously) — died saved a woman from a gang of armed attackers in Johannesburg (October 1986)
- Van der Westhuizen, Willem Petrus — saved a woman from a gang of armed attackers in Johannesburg (October 1986)
- Jooste, Johannes Petrus (posthumously) — died saving a woman from an oncoming train at [Stellenbosch] (February 1986)
- Saint, Douglas Brett (aged 11) — rescued his sister from a burning boat (December 1984)

== Discontinuation ==
The Woltemade Decoration for Bravery, Gold was discontinued in 1988, when it was replaced by the Woltemade Cross for Bravery, Gold (WD).
