= Woltemade =

Woltemade may refer to:

== People ==
- Nick Woltemade (born 2002), German footballer
- Wolraad Woltemade (1708–1773), Cape Town farmer

== Other ==
- Woltemade Decoration for Bravery, decoration and orders awarded in South Africa
