= Gallantry Cross =

The Gallantry Cross or Cross of Gallantry may refer to one of several military decorations:

- The Conspicuous Gallantry Cross, awarded by the United Kingdom for "an act or acts of conspicuous gallantry during active operations against the enemy".
- The Police Cross for Conspicuous Gallantry, awarded by the British South African Police in Rhodesia.
- The South African Police Silver Cross for Gallantry, awarded by the South African Police for "conspicuous and exceptional gallantry".
- The Gallantry Cross (Vietnam) or Vietnamese Cross of Gallantry, awarded by South Vietnam to soldiers and units "accomplishing deeds of valor or displayed heroic conduct while fighting an enemy force".
  - The Air Gallantry Cross and Navy Gallantry Cross, awarded by South Vietnam for aerial and naval actions in which a Gallantry Cross may be awarded.
