= Woltemade Decoration for Bravery, Silver =

- Type: Civil decoration for bravery
- Awarded for: Acts of conspicuous bravery
- Country: South Africa
- Presented by: the State President
- Eligibility: South African citizens
- Status: Discontinued in 1988
- Established: 1970
- First award: 1973
- Final award: 1985

Highlights
- Total: 3
- Ribbon bar

Pre-1994 & post-2002 orders of wear
- Next (higher): Pre-1994 precedence: Louw Wepener Decoration; Post-2002 precedence: Louw Wepener Decoration
- Equivalent: Union of South Africa King's Medal for Bravery, Silver; Union of South Africa Queen's Medal for Bravery, Silver
- Next (lower): Pre-1994 succession: South African Police Cross for Bravery; Post-2002 succession: South African Police Cross for Bravery

The Woltemade Decoration for Bravery, Silver is the lesser of two classes of a South African civil decoration for acts of bravery. It replaced the King's Medal for Bravery, Silver and the Queen's Medal for Bravery, Silver, the award of which was discontinued in South Africa in 1961.

== Institution ==
The Woltemade Decoration for Bravery, Silver was instituted by the Republic of South Africa in 1970, by Warrant of 20 May 1970, published in Government Gazette no. 2718 dated 29 May 1970. The Warrant was amended twice, on 11 November 1971 and 30 May 1973, to expand the eligibility for the award.

It is the lesser of two classes of South Africa's highest civilian decoration for bravery and it replaced and ranked on par with the King's and Queen's Medals for Bravery, Silver, the award of which was discontinued upon the establishment of the Republic of South Africa on 31 May 1961.

The decoration was named in memory of Wolraad Woltemade, an elderly servant of the Dutch East India Company, who gave his life while rescuing shipwrecked sailors in Table Bay on 1 June 1773. The ship De Jonge Thomas broke anchor in a gale force Northwestern and was driven ashore in the Salt River Mouth. Woltemade rode his horse into the sea seven times and brought surviving sailors ashore each time, but on the eighth excursion Woltemade and his exhausted horse were overladen by panic-stricken sailors and drowned.

== Award criteria ==
The Woltemade Decoration for Bravery, Silver could be awarded to South African citizens who performed acts of conspicuous bravery within or beyond the borders of the Republic of South Africa. The eligibility for award was subsequently expanded to non-citizens who have distinguished themselves in this manner in the Republic or in territories belonging to or administered by the Republic, or who elsewhere and in the face of extreme danger have saved the lives of South African citizens or protected property belonging to the Republic or endeavoured to do so.

The decoration was, like the earlier King's and Queen's Medals for Bravery, Silver, mainly intended for civilians and its award to members of the uniformed services was restricted to acts of gallantry for which the decorations of the services are not normally awarded.

== Order of wear ==
The position of the Woltemade Decoration for Bravery, Silver in the official national order of precedence was revised three times after 1990 to accommodate the inclusion or institution of new decorations and medals, first with the integration process of 1994, again when decorations and medals were belatedly instituted in April 1996 for the two former non-statutory para-military forces, the Azanian People's Liberation Army and Umkhonto we Sizwe, and again with the institution of new sets of awards in 2002 and 2003, but it remained unchanged on all three occasions.

- Preceded by the Louw Wepener Decoration (LWD).
- Succeeded by the South African Police Cross for Bravery (PCF).

== Description ==
Obverse
The decoration was struck in silver and is 38 millimetres in diameter with a raised rim and a large ring suspender. The obverse depicts Wolraad Woltemade on his horse in the waves, with the words "FOR BRAVERY • VIR DAPPERHEID" around the perimeter at the top. This was the same design as used on the earlier King's and Queen's Medals for Bravery, Silver.

Reverse
The reverse depicts the crest of the South African Coat of Arms, a lion holding four staves to represent the four provinces of the Republic of South Africa. The crest is encircled by a wreath of proteas which is, in turn, encircled by the inscription "REPUBLIEK VAN SUID-AFRIKA" above and "REPUBLIC OF SOUTH AFRICA" below.

Ribbon
The ribbon is 44 millimetres wide and blue with 4 millimetres wide light orange edges. The same ribbon was used for the Woltemade Decoration for Bravery, Gold.

== Discontinuation ==
The Woltemade Decoration for Bravery, Silver was discontinued in 1988, when it was replaced by the Woltemade Cross for Bravery, Silver (WDS).

== Recipients ==
The Woltemade Decoration for Bravery, Silver was awarded 44 times.

1973 (1 award)

- Le Roux, Johannes Lodewikus (posthumously) — died helping two fellow schoolchildren to escape from a bus trapped in the path of an oncoming train at Henley on Klip (28 January 1970)

1978 (2 awards)

- Kolver, Johannes Petrus — rescued a man from the jaws of a crocodile in the Kruger National Park (21 November 1976)
- Olivier, Louis Pieter — rescued a man from the jaws of a crocodile in the Kruger National Park (21 November 1976)

1982 (2 awards)

- Marais, Andries Josephus — saved someone from a shark attack
- Taylor, Wendy Lorraine — saved two children from drowning in the sea at Glenmore Beach (23 January 1981)

1985 (27 awards)

- Cooke, James Edward — laid demolition charges on the burning oil tanker Castillo de Bellver
- De Beer, Frederick Coenrad — laid demolition charges on the burning oil tanker Castillo de Bellver
- Gardner, Michael John Andrew — landed a helicopter on the burning oil tanker Castillo de Bellver to rescue a trapped seaman (5 August 1983)
- Labuschagne, Casper Jeremiah — landed a helicopter on the burning oil tanker Castillo de Bellver to rescue a trapped seaman (5 August 1983)
- Winson, Alan Robert — landed a helicopter on the burning oil tanker Castillo de Bellver to rescue a trapped seaman (5 August 1983)
- Alexander, William Robert — rescued children from the Westdene dam disaster (27 March 1985)
- Botha, Johannes Jurgens — rescued children from the Westdene dam disaster
- Bouwer, Izak Zierk — rescued children from the Westdene dam disaster
- Brodie, James McKenzie — rescued children from the Westdene dam disaster
- De Kooker, Bernadus Theodorus (aged 17) — rescued fellow pupils from the Westdene dam disaster
- Gordon, John James (aged 15) — rescued fellow pupils from the Westdene dam disaster
- Jansen van Nieuwenhuizen, Ockert Machiel — rescued children from the Westdene dam disaster
- Lourens, Dirk Johannes — rescued children from the Westdene dam disaster
- Nell, Kenneth Roy — rescued children from the Westdene dam disaster
- Roelofse, Adriaan Christiaan — rescued children from the Westdene dam disaster
- Schuman, Lucas — rescued children from the Westdene dam disaster
- Steyn, Petrus Jacobus — rescued children from the Westdene dam disaster
- Swanepoel, Christiaan Jacobus — rescued children from the Westdene dam disaster
- Van Aswegen, Willem Herklaas (aged 14) — rescued fellow pupils from the Westdene dam disaster
- Van der Walt, Gert Albertus — rescued children from the Westdene dam disaster
- Van Deventer, Catrina Jacoba (aged 17) — rescued fellow pupils from the Westdene dam disaster
- Van Lelyveld, Martin Ernest (aged 17) — rescued fellow pupils from the Westdene dam disaster
- Van Wyk, Stephanus Johannes (aged 17) — rescued fellow pupils from the Westdene dam disaster
- Viljoen, Coenraad Rudolf (aged 15) — rescued fellow pupils from the Westdene dam disaster
- Waldeck, Petrus Gerhardus (aged 14) — rescued fellow pupils from the Westdene dam disaster
- Wehmeyer, Matthys Louis (aged 17) — rescued fellow pupils from the Westdene dam disaster
- McDonald, Victoria Petronella Martina — saved a friend from an attacker with a knife at Temba (4 December 1984)

1986 (3 awards)

- April, James
- Du Plessis, Andrew John — saved a woman from drowning in the sea at Llandudno (18 February 1984)
- Hutchison, Jonathan Roger — saved a child from drowning in the sea at Ballito bay (8 November 1985)

1987 (9 awards)

- Anthony, James John Rodger (posthumously) — died trying to save Rene and Karin Idas from drowning at Silwerstroom Beach (January 1987)
- Idas, Rene Edwina — saved her sister Karin, and tried to save Rodger Anthony, from drowning at Silwerstroom Beach (January 1987)
- Idas Karin Belinda — saved her sister Rene, and tried to save Rodger Anthony, from drowning at Silwerstroom Beach (January 1987)
- Canfield, Shahied — rescued a baby from a burning house in Bonteheuwel (November 1986)
- Klein, Yolande Anushka (aged 10) — saved her younger brother from electrocution (June 1986)
- Nkabinde, Goodwill — rescued four handicapped children from a burning bus in Johannesburg (1986)
- Oelofse, Nicolaas Jacobus — rescued two children from a burning car near Ventersdorp (October 1986)
- Crous, Derek — rescued two children from a burning car near Ventersdorp (October 1986)
- Hattingh, Barry Arnold — rescued a woman from a burning car seconds before it exploded (May 1986)
