= Cross of War for Valor (Peru) =

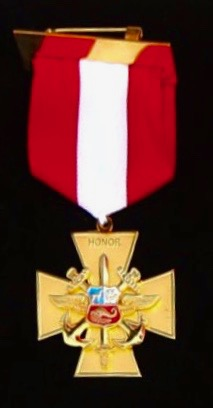
- Type: Military award
- Awarded for: Military bravery
- Description: Red and white ribbon
- Presented by: the Republic of Peru
- Status: Currently awarded
- Ribbon of the cross

The Peruvian Cross of War for Valor is awarded by the Republic of Peru to members of the Peruvian Armed Forces who have demonstrated tremendous acts of bravery.

== Recipients ==
- Operation Chavín de Huántar operatives
