= South African Police decorations =

An overview of South African police decorations and medals, which form part of the South African honours system.

== South African Police ==
The South African Police was established in 1913 as a national police force. It had a secondary military role, which came to the fore in World War I and again in World War II.

=== 1923-1963 ===
The SAP was eligible for the British King's Police Medal, which was awarded annually throughout the British Empire. This was discontinued in 1933, because South Africa had become independent as a member of the new British Commonwealth, and it was replaced in 1937 by a special South African issue of the medal. From 1923, the SAP also had its own long service medal, which doubled as a medal for gallantry. The medals available to the SAP between 1923 and 1963 were thus:

==== Decoration ====
- Queen's Police Medal (South Africa) (1937–61)

==== Campaign medal ====
- 1943: Africa Service Medal (WWII)

==== Long service medal ====
- Police Good Service Medal (1923–63)

Until 1952, they were incorporated into the British honours system. Thereafter they formed part of the new South African honours system.

=== 1963-2003 ===
After South Africa became a republic (in 1961), the government instituted an entirely new series of decorations and medals for the SAP. It was added to several times over the years:

==== Decorations ====
- 1979–1986: South African Police Star for Distinguished Leadership (SED)
- 1979–1986: South African Police Star for Distinguished Service (SOO) (Note: (SOO) - 2nd Type)
- 1963–1989: South African Police Cross for Bravery (PCF) (Note: (PCF) - 1st Type (1963-89))
- 1989–2004: South African Police Cross for Bravery (Gold) (PCFG)
- 1985–1989: South African Police Silver Cross for Gallantry (Silver) (SCG)
- 1989–2004: South African Police Cross for Bravery (Silver) (PCFS)
- 1989–2004: South African Police Cross for Bravery (PCF) (Note: (PCF) - 2nd Type (1989-2004))
- 1963–1979: South African Police Star for Distinguished Service (SOO) (Note: (SOO) - 1st Type)
- 1979–2004: South African Police Star for Outstanding Service (SOE)

==== Campaign medal ====
- 1974–1995: South African Police Medal for Combating Terrorism

==== Commemorative medals ====
- 1988: South African Police Seventy-Fifth Anniversary Commemorative Medal
- 1995: South African Police Service Amalgamation Medal

==== Long service medals ====
- 1963–2004: South African Police Star for Merit
- 1979–2004: South African Police Star for Faithful Service
- 1963–2004: South African Police Medal for Faithful Service

In 1994, the SAP amalgamated with the police forces of the former "homelands" inside South Africa, to form the South African Police Service.

== South African Railways Police ==
=== 1934-1966 ===
The South African Railways Police was established in 1934, to police the country's railways and harbours. It was later responsible for air services too. The SARP was modeled on the SAP, and shared the King's/Queen's Police Medal with it. It also had its own long service medal: the Railways Police Good Service Medal (1934–66).

=== 1966-1986 ===
An entirely new series of decorations and medals was instituted for the SARP in 1966, to match those established for the SAP in 1963. The series was enlarged in 1980, to correspond to the changes made to the SAP awards in 1979. The full range of honours was:

==== Decorations ====
- 1980–1986: South African Railways Police Star for Distinguished Leadership (SEE)
- 1980–1986: South African Railways Police Star for Distinguished Devotion (SDE)
- 1966–1986: South African Railways Police Cross for Valour (IF)
- 1966–1986: Decoration for Outstanding Service in the South African Railways Police Force (SMO)

==== Campaign medal ====
- 1980–1986: South African Railways Police Medal for Combating Terrorism

==== Long service medals ====
- 1966–1986: Star for Merit in the South African Railways Police Force
- 1980–1986: South African Railways Police Star for Faithful Service
- 1966–1980: Medal for Faithful Service in the South African Railways Police Force (Note: South African Railways Police - Faithful Service - 1^{st} Type)
- 1966–1980: Medal for Faithful Service in the South African Railways Police Force (Note: South African Railways Police - Faithful Service - 2^{nd} Type)

The SARP was amalgamated into the SA Police on 1 October 1986, with all its personnel, assets and equipment transferred to the SAP.

== South African Police Service ==
The South African Police Service, which was formed in 1994 by amalgamating the SAP and the police forces of the former homelands, used the SAP decorations and medals until 2004, when a new series of decorations was instituted:

=== Decorations ===
- South African Police Service Gold Cross for Bravery (PCFG)
- South African Police Service Silver Cross for Bravery (PCFS)
- South African Police Service Gold Medal for Outstanding Service (SOEG)
- South African Police Service Silver Medal for Outstanding Service (SOES)
- South African Police Service Commendation Medal

=== Commemorative medal ===
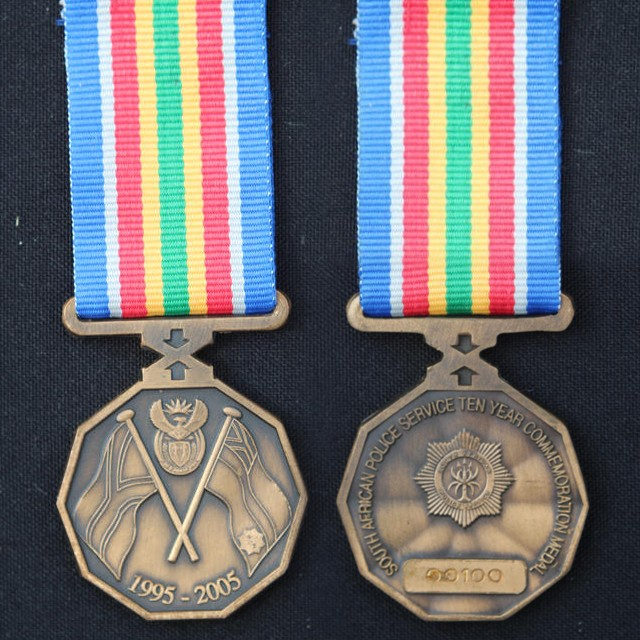
Ten Year Commemoration Medal

- 2005: South African Police Service Ten Year Commemoration Medal
- 2010: South African Police Service World Cup 2010 Support Award
- 2013: Centenary Medal - South African Police Service (Note: Celebrating 100 years of policing 1913–2013)

=== Long service medals ===
- South African Police Service Forty Year Loyal Service Medal
- South African Police Service Thirty Year Loyal Service Medal
- South African Police Service Twenty Year Loyal Service Medal
- South African Police Service Ten Year Loyal Service Medal

=== Animal decoration ===
- South African Police Service Canine & Equine Star for Bravery

== Municipal/Metropolitan Police Service ==
In 1998, the municipal and metropolitan council police forces were brought under the auspices of the SA Police Service Act, and became collectively known as the Municipal/Metropolitan Police Service. A series of decorations and medals was instituted for them in 2008.

=== Decorations ===
- Municipal/Metropolitan Police Service Gold Cross for Bravery (Gold) (MPBG)
- Municipal/Metropolitan Police Service Silver Cross for Bravery (Silver) (MPSB)
- Municipal/Metropolitan Police Service Gold Decoration for Outstanding Service (Gold) (MPGS)
- Municipal/Metropolitan Police Service Silver Decoration for Outstanding Service (Silver) (MPSS)
- Municipal/Metropolitan Police Service Commendation Medal

=== Commemorative Medal ===
- Municipal/Metropolitan Police Service Inauguration Medal

=== Long service medals ===
- Municipal/Metropolitan Police Service Forty Year Loyal Service Medal (40 Years)
- Municipal/Metropolitan Police Service Thirty Year Loyal Service Medal (30 Years)
- Municipal/Metropolitan Police Service Twenty Year Loyal Service Medal (20 Years)
- Municipal/Metropolitan Police Service Ten Year Loyal Service Medal (10 Years)

=== Animal decoration ===
- Municipal/Metropolitan Police Service Canine & Equine Cross for Bravery

== See also ==
- British and Commonwealth orders and decorations
- South African civil honours
- South African intelligence service decorations
- South African military decorations
- South African orders and decorations
- South African prisons decorations
