= South African Police Silver Cross for Gallantry =

SA Police Silver Cross for Gallantry
- Ribbon: 36mm, blue, with white-red-white edges
- Type: Decoration
- Awarded for: Conspicuous and exceptional gallantry
- Country: Republic of South Africa
- Presented by: South African Police
- Eligibility: All ranks
- Status: Discontinued 1989

The South African Police Silver Cross for Gallantry was a decoration that existed between 1985 and 1989.

== History ==
Instituted on 29 January 1985, the SCG was awarded to all ranks of the South African Police for conspicuous and exceptional gallantry while fighting terrorism (Note: "terrorism" being the then South African government's name for the military struggles being waged against white minority rule in apartheid-era South Africa and South West Africa)).

The SCG is a silver cross pattee, displaying a gold SAP badge enclosed in a laurel wreath. The reverse depicts the SAP Memorial at Berg-en-Dal. The ribbon is blue, with white-red-white edges.

The SCG was discontinued when the SA Police Cross for Bravery was expanded to three classes on 17 May 1989.

== See also ==
- South African civil honours
- South African police decorations
