= Union of South Africa King's Medal for Bravery, Silver =

- Type: Civil decoration for bravery
- Awarded for: Acts of conspicuous bravery
- Country: UK South Africa
- Presented by: the Monarch of the United Kingdom and the Dominions of the British Commonwealth, and Emperor of India
- Eligibility: South African citizens
- Status: Discontinued in 1952
- Established: 1939

Highlights
- Total: 34
- Ribbon bar

British & South African orders of wear
- Next (higher): UK precedence: Indian Distinguished Service Medal, Silver; SA precedence: Louw Wepener Decoration
- Equivalent: Union of South Africa Queen's Medal for Bravery, Silver; Woltemade Decoration for Bravery, Silver
- Next (lower): UK succession: Distinguished Service Medal; SA succession: South African Police Cross for Bravery

The Union of South Africa King's Medal for Bravery, Silver is the lesser of two classes of a South African civil decoration for acts of bravery that was in use from 1939 to 1952, when the country was a constitutional monarchy in the British Commonwealth. The medal was instituted by King George VI on 23 June 1939.

== Institution ==
The Union of South Africa King's Medal for Bravery, Silver, the lesser of two classes of South Africa's highest civilian decoration for bravery, was instituted by Royal Warrant of 23 June 1939, published in Government Gazette no. 2671 dated 25 August 1939, and amended by Royal Warrants of 18 February 1947, 24 October 1949 and 17 October 1950.

== Award criteria ==
The medal was awarded to recognise gallantry performed in the face of imminent and obvious peril by those residents of the Union of South Africa or its dependent territories who endangered their own lives in the act of saving, or endeavouring to save, the lives of others.

Although it was primarily a civilian award, it was also granted to military personnel for non-combatant acts of gallantry during the Second World War.

== Order of wear ==
In the British order of precedence, the Union of South Africa King's Medal for Bravery, Silver ranks as a third level decoration, equivalent to the Queen's Gallantry Medal. It is preceded by the Indian Distinguished Service Medal and succeeded by the Distinguished Service Medal.

In South Africa, the medal is ranked as a second level decoration and, despite its status, it has no post-nominal letters. It is preceded by the Louw Wepener Decoration and succeeded by the South African Police Cross for Bravery.

== Description ==
Obverse
The decoration is struck in silver and is a disk, 38 millimetres in diameter with a raised rim and a large ring suspender. The obverse depicts the crowned effigy of King George VI, facing left, surrounded by the words "GEORGIVS VI REX ET IMPERATOR".

Reverse
A public competition was held to find a suitable design for the reverse of the medal. The winning entry, by Miss Renee Joubert, depicts the 18th-century Cape hero Wolraad Woltemade on his horse, rescuing shipwreck survivors from a stormy sea. As a result, the medal became commonly referred to as the Woltemade Medal. The image is circumscribed with the words "FOR BRAVERY • VIR DAPPERHEID" around the top.

Ribbon
The ribbon is 44 millimetres wide and dark blue with 4½ millimetres wide orange edges.

== Discontinuation ==
Upon the accession to the British Throne of Queen Elizabeth II on 6 February 1952, the Union of South Africa King's Medal for Bravery, Silver was discontinued and replaced by the Union of South Africa Queen's Medal for Bravery, Silver.

== Recipients ==
The Union of South Africa King's Medal for Bravery, Silver was awarded to altogether thirty-four individuals, of whom eighteen were military personnel.

	Title/ Rank	Name	Gazette date	Action cited for
1	Mr	Dalling, William Tweeddale	29 Dec 1939	Tried to save a black man in a rock-burst, Rose Deep Mine
2	Mr	Nourse, Dennis	9 Aug 1940	Saved a man from being savaged by a shark, Warner Beach, Natal
3	Mr	Moubray, Robert John	31 Jan 1941	Jumped down a 50 feet waterfall near Tzaneen to save a friend, who had fallen and struck his head, from drowning in the pool below
4	Mr	Van den Berg, Michael Adriaan	4 Apr 1941	Saved an injured miner despite ignited dynamite fuses, Venterspost Gold Mine
5	Mr	Givana, son of Siqwayini	4 Apr 1941	Assisted Mr. M.A. van den Berg in the aforementioned rescue, Venterspost Gold Mine
6	Mr	Snell, Hendrik	28 Aug 1942	Tried to save the pilot in a crashed and burning aircraft, Landsdowne Road, Cape Town
7	Lt	Rabe, Arnold (SAAF)	30 Jul 1943	Saved a pilot from a burning aircraft
8	T/F Sgt	Brady, Martin Wilson Taylor Bellingham (SAAF)	17 Dec 1943	Saved a pilot from a burning aircraft, Youngsfield Base, Cape Town
9	Pupil Pilot	De Jong, Daniel Nicholaas (SAAF)	4 Feb 1944	Saved his instructor from a burning aircraft, Standerton
10	T/2 Lt	Fowles, Geoffrey Turner (SAAF)	4 Feb 1944	Saved a pilot from a burning aircraft, Pietersburg
11	A/M	Botes, Rudolph Daniel (SAAF)	4 Feb 1944	Attempted to save the crew of a burning aircraft, Wingfield, Cape Town
12	Mr	Mpotu	6 Apr 1944	Saved a miner in the face of exploding dynamite, Venterspost Gold Mine
13	A/Cpl	Faul, Joseph Piek (SAAF)	21 Apr 1944	Tried to save a man overcome by fumes in the fuel tank of a Catalina aircraft
14	T/Capt	Fisher, H.S. (UDF)	14 Sep 1945	Gallantry displayed on the occasion of an explosion on 14 March 1945 at the Grand Magazine, Pretoria
15	T/Capt	Warner, A.L.H. (UDF)	14 Sep 1945	Gallantry displayed on the occasion of an explosion on 14 March 1945
16	T/Lt	Solomon, H.I. (UDF)	14 Sep 1945	Gallantry displayed on the occasion of an explosion on 14 March 1945
17	T/WO2	Bruyns, H.C. (UDF)	14 Sep 1945	Gallantry displayed on the occasion of an explosion on 14 March 1945
18	WO2	Murcia, L. (UDF)	14 Sep 1945	Gallantry displayed on the occasion of an explosion on 14 March 1945
19	T/S Sgt	Du Plessis, P.F. (UDF)	14 Sep 1945	Gallantry displayed on the occasion of an explosion on 14 March 1945
20	Sgt	Pentz, C. (UDF)	14 Sep 1945	Gallantry displayed on the occasion of an explosion on 14 March 1945
21	L Cpl	Seholi, Peter (UDF)	7 Dec 1945	Rescued two men, gassed in a sewer, Maitland, Cape Town
22	Sgt	Ferreira, I.M. (UDF)	8 Feb 1946	Gallantry displayed on the occasion of an explosion on 14 March 1945
23	Sgt	Bronkhost, N.J. (UDF)	8 Feb 1946	Gallantry displayed on the occasion of an explosion on 14 March 1945
24	T/Cpl	Breet, W.S. (UDF)	8 Feb 1946	Gallantry displayed on the occasion of an explosion on 14 March 1945
25	Mr	Theron, Marthinus Jacobus	15 Feb 1946	Gallantry displayed on the occasion of an explosion on 14 March 1945
26	Mr	Hall, John Bassett	15 Feb 1946	Gallantry displayed on the occasion of an explosion on 14 March 1945
27	Mr	Sehlogo, Andries	15 Feb 1946	Gallantry displayed on the occasion of an explosion on 14 March 1945
28	Mr	Nel, Frederick	15 Feb 1946	Gallantry displayed on the occasion of an explosion on 14 March 1945
29	Mr	Clark, Edward George	15 Feb 1946	Gallantry displayed on the occasion of an explosion on 14 March 1945
30	Mr	Snyder, Erle Snider	15 Feb 1946	Gallantry displayed on the occasion of an explosion on 14 March 1945
31	Mr	Mpye, Amos	15 Feb 1946	Gallantry displayed on the occasion of an explosion on 14 March 1945
32	AB	Adlam, H.S.J. (SANF (V))	12 Apr 1946	Saved a black man from the sea and sharks, Durban
33	Mr	Lewis, Peter Thomas	23 Jan 1948	Saved a child from the path of a railway locomotive, Pretoria
34	Master	Hart, Jack Jacobus	22 Oct 1948	At age 14, rescued a child from a burning garden hut, Johannesburg
