= Orders, decorations, and medals of South Africa =

South African orders, decorations and medals are those military and civilian orders, decorations and medals issued by the Government of South Africa. The following is a (non-exhaustive) list of these:

== Union of South Africa ==
The Union of South Africa was formed in 1910, as a self-governing Dominion in the British Empire. A medal was issued to commemorate the event.

As a Dominion, the Union came under the British honours system, and South Africans featured in the semi-annual British honours lists. South Africans also received British civilian decorations for bravery. The nationalist government stopped the conferment of titles and orders in 1925, and discontinued nominations for bravery awards after the Union's independence was recognised in 1931. It established its own bravery awards a few years later.

The Union's civil honours thus consisted of:

- Decoration
  - King's/Queen's Medal for Bravery (1939–61)
- Commemorative Medal
  - Union of South Africa Commemoration Medal (1910)
- War service medal
  - South African Medal for War Services (1945)

When South Africa established its own independent honours system in 1952, the Queen's Medal for Bravery was transferred to it. The medal issued to mark Queen Elizabeth II's coronation in 1953 was also ranked as a South African award, because she was Queen of South Africa as well as of the United Kingdom and her other realms and territories.

== Republic of South Africa ==
South Africa became a republic outside the Commonwealth on 31 May 1961.

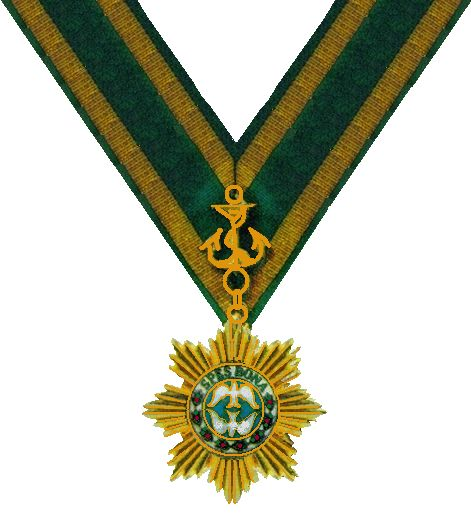
Order of Good Hope

=== 1967–1986 ===
During the 1960s and 1970s, the government developed a small range of civil honours to recognise bravery and meritorious service:

- Decorations and orders
  - Woltemade Decoration for Bravery (1970–88)
  - Order of the Star of South Africa (Civilian Division) (SSA/SSAS) (1978–2002)
  - Order of Good Hope (1973–2003)
  - Decoration for Meritorious Service (DMS) (1970–86)
  - Civil Defence Medal for Bravery (1976–??)
  - Civil Defence Medal for Meritorious Service (1976–??)

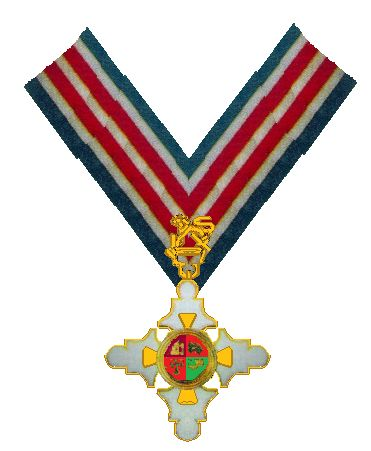
Order for Meritorious Service

- Sports awards
  - State President's Sports Award (1967–94)
  - South African Sports Merit Award (1971–94)

=== 1986–2002 ===
The civil honours system was enlarged during the 1980s. In 1986, the five orders were collectively dubbed the "national orders", and a Chancery of Orders was established in the Office of the State President to administer them. These were retained after South Africa's return to the Commonwealth of Nations in 1994. The expanded honours system comprised:

- Decorations and orders
  - Woltemade Cross for Bravery (WD/WDS) (1988–2002)
  - Order of the Southern Cross (OSG/OSS) (1986–2002)
  - Order of the Star of South Africa (Non-Military) (SSA/SSAS) (1978–2002)
  - Order for Meritorious Service (OMSG/OMSS) (1986–2002)
  - Order of Good Hope (1973–2003)
  - Civil Protection Medal for Bravery (1976–??)
  - President's Decoration for Distinguished Service (1987–??)
  - Civil Protection Medal for Meritorious Service (1976–??)
- Sports awards
  - State President's Sports Award (1967–94)
  - South African Sports Merit Award (1971–94)

==== Union of South Africa King's/Queen's Medal for Bravery ====
The Union of South Africa King's Medal for Bravery was instituted in 1939 to award South African citizens for exceptional gallantry in saving life.

The decoration had two grades (Gold and Silver) and had a blue ribbon with orange edges. The medal lapsed on 31 May 1961, when South Africa became a republic, albeit, outside the Commonwealth.

==== Woltemade Decoration for Bravery ====
The Woltemade Decoration for Bravery was a revived, republican version of the King's/Queen's Medal for Bravery. It was instituted in 1970 and was awarded until 1988, when it was replaced by the Woltemade Cross for Bravery.

==== Woltemade Cross for Bravery ====
The Woltemade Cross for Bravery (post-nominal letters: WD) was instituted in 1988, replacing the Woltemade Decoration, to award South African citizens for outstanding bravery in saving life. The cross had two grades (Gold and Silver) and had a blue ribbon with orange edges. The Woltemade Cross was discontinued in 2002.

== Current orders, decorations and medals ==
=== Military ===
==== Nkwe (Leopard) decorations for bravery ====
The three Nkwe (Leopard) Decorations for Bravery are awarded for bravery in military operations in place of the Honoris Crux Decorations in 2003.

The three Leopard Decorations are:

- Nkwe ya Gauta (Golden Leopard) (post-nominal: NG), for exceptional bravery during military operations.
- Nkwe ya Selefera (Silver Leopard) (post-nominal: NS), for conspicuous bravery during military operations.
- Nkwe ya Boronse (Bronze Leopard) (post-nominal: NB), for bravery during military operations.

==== Protea Decoration for Merit ====
The three Protea Decorations for Merit are for leadership, meritorious conduct or devotion to duty in place of the previous Southern Cross Decoration, Southern Cross Medal and Military Merit Medal.

The three Protea Decorations are:

- iPhrothiya yeGolide (post-nominal: PG), to officers for outstanding service of the highest order and utmost devotion to duty.
- iPhrothiya yeSiliva (post-nominal: PS), to officers for exceptionally meritorious service and particular devotion to duty.
- iPhrothiya yeBhronzi (post-nominal: PB), to all ranks of the SANDF who have distinguished themselves by performing services of the highest order.

=== Civilian ===
The "old" South African honours were retained for a few years after the Republic was reconstituted as a multi-racial democratic state in 1994. The sports awards were, however, replaced immediately. A new series of national orders was introduced in 2002, as part of the process of creating new national symbols. The current civil honours are:

- Sports awards
  - Presidential Sports Award (1994– )
- Provincial orders
  - Western Cape Golden Cross
  - Order of the Disa

==== Order of the Baobab ====
The Order of the Baobab (SCOB/GCOB/COB) was instituted in 2002 to award South African citizens for services to democracy, human rights, arts and sciences and community service.

The order has three grades: Gold, Silver and Bronze.

==== Order of Ikhamanga ====
The Order of Ikhamanga (OIG/OIS/OIB) was instituted in 2003 to award South African citizens who have excelled in the fields of arts, culture, literature, music, journalism and sport.

The order has three grades: Gold, Silver and Bronze.

==== Order of Luthuli ====
The Order of Luthuli was instituted in 2003 to award South African citizens who have made a meaningful contribution to the struggle for democracy, human rights, nation-building, justice, peace and conflict resolution.

The order has three grades: Gold, Silver and Bronze.

==== Order of Mapungubwe ====
The Order of Mapungubwe (OMP/OMG/OMS/OMB) was instituted in 2002 to award South African citizens for excellence and exceptional achievement. The order has four grades: Platinum, Gold, Silver and Bronze.

==== Order of the Companions of O. R. Tambo ====
The Order of the Companions of O. R. Tambo (SCOT/GCOT/COT) was instituted in 2002 to award heads of state and senior diplomats of other countries for showing friendship towards South Africa.

The order has three grades: Gold, Silver and Bronze.

==== The Order of Mendi for Bravery ====
The Order of Mendi for Bravery (OMBG/OMBS/OMBB) (originally the Mendi Decoration for Bravery) is awarded to South African citizens who have performed an extraordinary act of bravery that placed their lives in great danger, or who lost their own lives, including in trying to save the life of another person, or by saving property, in or outside the Republic of South Africa.

The order has three grades (post-nominal letters in brackets): Gold (OMBG), Silver (OMBS) and Bronze (OMBB). The ribbon is gold coloured and has cream-coloured lion footprints upon it.

==== The Order of South Africa ====
The Order of South Africa is awarded to foreign heads of state. It has one grade (Gold). It was first awarded to Xi Jinping in 2023.

== See also ==
- British and Commonwealth orders and decorations
- Evolution of the South African honours system
- Military history of South Africa
- South African civil honours
- South African intelligence service decorations
- South African military decorations
- South African orders and decorations
- South African police decorations
- South African prisons decorations

== Bibliography ==
- Alexander, E. G. M.; Barron, G. K. B.; Bateman, A. J. (1986). South African Orders, Decorations and Medals. Human and Rousseau. ISBN 9780798118958.
- Monick, S. (1990). South African Civil Awards 1910–1990. South African National Museum of Military History.
- Monick, Stanley (1988). Awards of the South African Uniformed Public Services, 1922-1987: The South African Police, South African Railways Police, South African Prisons Service. South African National Museum of Military History. ISBN 978-0-620-12747-9.
- Fforde, J. P. I.; Monick, Stanley (1986). A Guide to South African Orders, Decorations and Medals and Their Ribbons, 1896-1985. South African National Museum of Military History. ISBN 978-0-620-11344-1.
