= South African intelligence service decorations =

An overview of South African intelligence service decorations and medals, which form part of the South African honours system.

== National Intelligence Service ==
The National Intelligence Service was established in 1963 as Republican Intelligence, a branch of the South African Police. It became a separate service, the Bureau for State Security, in 1968, and was renamed the Directorate of National Security in 1979 and the National Intelligence Service in 1980.

A series of decorations and medals was instituted for the NIS in 1981. It was enlarged in 1987 and 1990.

- Decorations
  - NIS Decoration for Distinguished Leadership (ED) (1981–94)
  - NIS Cross for Valour (CV) (1981–94)
  - NIS Decoration for Outstanding Leadership (OD) (1981–94)
  - NIS Civil Decoration (1981–94)
  - NIS Decoration (1981–94)
  - NIS Medal for Distinguished Service (1981–94)
  - NIS Civil Medal (1990–94)
- Long service medal
  - NIS Medal for Faithful Service (1981–94)

The NIS was superseded in 1994 by the National Intelligence Agency and the South African Secret Service.

== National Intelligence Agency and SA Secret Service ==
A new series of decorations and medals was instituted in 2005 for members of the National Intelligence Agency and the South African Secret Service (collectively referred to as the "Intelligence Services"):

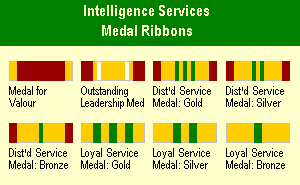

- Decorations
  - Intelligence Services Medal for Valour (South Africa) (MV) (2005- )
  - Intelligence Services Outstanding Leadership Medal (South Africa) (OLM) (2005- )
  - Intelligence Services Distinguished Service Medal (South Africa) (2005- )
- Long service medal
  - Intelligence Services Loyal Service Medal (2005- )

== See also ==
- British and Commonwealth orders and decorations
- South African civil honours
- South African military decorations
- South African orders and decorations
- South African police decorations
- South African prisons decorations
