= South African prisons decorations =

An overview of South African prisons service decorations and medals, which form part of the South African honours system.

== Prisons Department ==
=== 1922-1968 ===
The Prisons Department was established in 1911. It was a civil service department, with uniformed warders. In 1955, the department adopted military ranks, and in 1959 its uniformed branch was named the South African Prisons Service.

The department had only one medal:

- Long service medal
  - Faithful Service Medal of the Prisons Department (1922–68).

Until 1952, it was incorporated into the British honours system, as used in South Africa. Thereafter, it was part of the new South African honours system.

== South African Prisons Service (1968-1980) ==
After South Africa became a republic (in 1961), the government established new decorations and medals for the various services. A series of three was instituted for the SA Prisons Service in 1968:

=== Decorations ===
- 1968–1980: Decoration for Valour in the SA Prisons Service (Valour) (CPV)
- 1968–1980: Medal for Merit in the SA Prisons Service (Merit)

=== Long service medal ===
- 1968–1980: Medal for Faithful Service in the SA Prisons Service

== Department of Correctional Services (1980-1996) ==
A new, and more comprehensive, series of decorations and medals was instituted in 1980. The SA Prisons Service was renamed Department of Correctional Services in 1990.

=== Decorations ===
- 1980–1996: Department of Correctional Services Star for Excellence (SPE)
- 1980–1996: Department of Correctional Services Cross for Valour (Diamond) (CPV)
- 1980–1996: Department of Correctional Services Cross for Valour (Ruby) (CPF)
- 1980–1996: Department of Correctional Services Star for Distinction (SPO)
- 1980–1996: Department of Correctional Services Star for Merit (SPM)
- 1980–1996: Department of Correctional Services Cross for Merit (CPM)
- 1980–1996: Department of Correctional Services Medal for Merit (Officers)
- 1980–1996: Department of Correctional Services Medal for Merit (Non-Commissioned Officers)

=== Long service medal ===
- 1980–1996: Department of Correctional Services Medal for Faithful Service (Gold)
- 1980–1996: Department of Correctional Services Medal for Faithful Service (Silver)
- 1980–1996: Department of Correctional Services Medal for Faithful Service (Bronze)

In 1996, the department discontinued its military ranks and culture, including its decorations and medals.

== See also ==
- British and Commonwealth orders and decorations
- South African civil honours
- South African intelligence service decorations
- South African military decorations
- South African orders and decorations
- South African police decorations
