= South African Police Medal for Combating Terrorism =

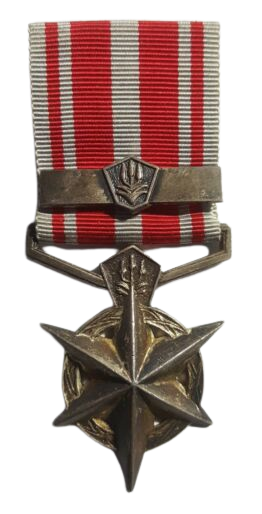
- Obverse of the medal.
- Type: Police campaign medal
- Country: South Africa
- Presented by: the State President
- Eligibility: All Ranks
- Campaign(s): Rhodesian Bush War, South African Border War

The South African Police Medal for Combatting Terrorism is a South African police campaign medal which was instituted by the Republic in 1974. It was awarded to members of the South African Police for service in an operational area or for engagement in armed combat with the enemy. It was also awarded for service against the People's Liberation Army of Namibia in South-West Africa, or for counter-terrorist operations in Rhodesia during the Rhodesian Bush War. Silver bars were used to denote subsequent awards.

== Award criteria ==
The medal could be awarded to serving members of all ranks of the South African Police. The conditions for award stipulated that the recipient had to have:

- been involved in combat or a skirmish or combat situation with terrorists, or
- been injured through terrorist activities, or
- completed 60 days of counter-insurgency duties in a designated area.

The medal was awarded with a certificate. The example pictured is to then-Major General M.C.W. Geldenhuys:

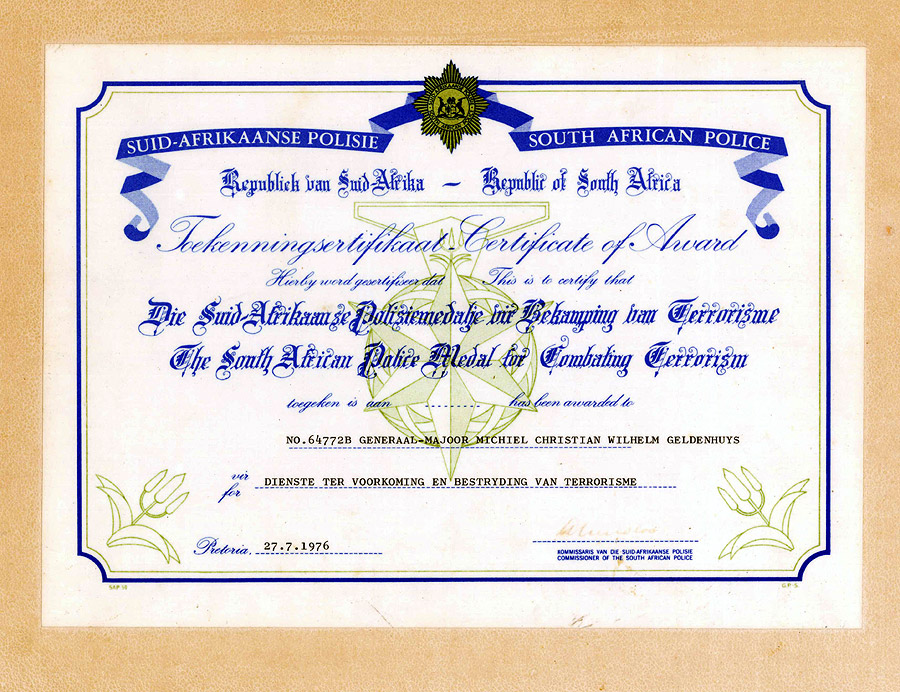

== Recipients ==
While no definitive roll of recipients of the South African Police Medal for Combating Terrorism is known to exist, a rough indication of how many were awarded per year is indicated by the Annual Report of the Commissioner of the South African Police for the Period 1 July 1978 to 30 June 1979. The report states that; "The South African Police Medal for Combating Terrorism was awarded to 231 White and 18 Non-White members, while 171 White and four Non-White members received bars." The report's wording is unclear as to if "non-white" refers only to mixed-race members of the force and members of Indian descent, or if it refers to black African members of the force too. Non-white members of the force, presumably including black Africans, made up 46% of the force's members during the same period.

== See also ==
- South African Police decorations
