= South African military decorations =

Part of South African honours system

An overview of South African military decorations and medals, which form part of the South African honours system.

== Colonial forces 1894–1913 ==
The colonial military forces received British military decorations in wartime. From 1894, the colonial governments awarded medals for distinguished conduct and for long service. This was the general practice in the British Empire at that time. The colonial medals were:

- Decorations
  - Volunteer Officers' Decoration (VD) (1894–1901)
  - Colonial Auxiliary Forces Officers' Decoration (VD) (1900–13)
  - Distinguished Conduct Medal (1894–1913)
  - Distinguished Conduct Medal (Natal) 1894–1913)
  - Distinguished Conduct Medal (Cape of Good Hope) (1894–1913)
  - Distinguished Conduct Medal (Transvaal) (1902–1913)
- Campaign medals
  - Cape of Good Hope General Service Medal (1900)
  - Natal Native Rebellion Medal (1907)
- Long service medals
  - Meritorious Service Medal (1845–1913)
  - Meritorious Service Medal (Cape of Good Hope) (1896–1913)
  - Meritorious Service Medal (Natal) (1896–1913)
  - Army Long Service and Good Conduct Medal (1830–1896)
  - Army Long Service and Good Conduct Medal (Cape of Good Hope) (1896–1910)
  - Army Long Service and Good Conduct Medal (Natal) (1896–1910)
  - Permanent Forces of the Empire Beyond the Seas Medal (1910–1913)
  - Volunteer Long Service Medal for India and the Colonies (1896–1901)
  - Colonial Auxiliary Forces Long Service Medal (1900–13).

== Union Defence Forces 1913–1952 ==
The colonial forces were replaced in 1912 by the Union Defence Forces, which continued the system. British decorations for gallantry and distinguished service were awarded during World War I and World War II, and the South African government granted the other categories of award. They were:

- Decoration
  - Distinguished Conduct Medal (1914–40)
- Campaign medals
  - Victory Medal (1919)
  - Africa Service Medal (1943)
- Long service medals
  - Permanent Forces of the Empire Beyond the Seas Medal (1913–1930)
  - Medal for Long Service and Good Conduct (Military) (1930–39)
  - Medal for Long Service and Good Conduct (South Africa) (1939–52)
  - Meritorious Service Medal (1914–40)
  - Colonial Auxiliary Forces Officers' Decoration (VD) (1913–39)
  - Colonial Auxiliary Forces Long Service Medal (1913–39)
  - Efficiency Decoration (ED) (1939–52)
  - Efficiency Medal (1939–52)
  - RNVR Volunteer Officers' Decoration Medal (VD) (1915–49)
  - RNVR Long Service & Good Conduct Medal (1915–49)
  - Air Efficiency Award (1950–52).

== Boer war veterans ==
In 1920, the South African government instituted a separate set of awards, for Boer veterans of the 1899–1902 Anglo-Boer War — neither of the Boer republics for which they had fought had had its own honours system. The awards were:

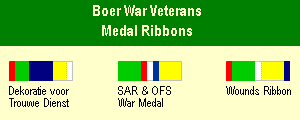

- Decoration
  - Dekoratie voor Trouwe Dienst (Decoration for Devoted Service) (DTD)
- Campaign medals
  - South African Republic & Orange Free State War Medal
  - Wounds Ribbon.

== South African Defence Force ==
=== 1952–1975 ===
South Africa introduced its own honours system in 1952. Its largest component was a series of military decorations and medals, which not only replaced the existing long service medals, but provided substitutes for the decorations which the British government had awarded in wartime:

Decoration Name	Post Nominals	Period current	Number awarded	Awarded for	Ribbon
Castle of Good Hope Decoration	CGH	1952–2003	Never awarded	Most conspicuous bravery	Castle of Good Hope Decoration CGH
Louw Wepener Decoration	LWD	1952–1975	7	Most conspicuous courage or greatest heroism	
Star of South Africa	SSA	1952–1975	20	Exceptionally meritorious service	
Van Riebeeck Decoration	DVR	1952–1975	2	Distinguished service in the field (officers)	
Honoris Crux (1952)	HC	1952–1975	5	Gallantry in action against the enemy	
Van Riebeeck Medal	VRM	1952–1975	5	Distinguished service in the field (other ranks)	
Louw Wepener Medal	LWM	1967–1975	8	Courageous or heroic deeds in saving lives	
Southern Cross Medal (1952)	SM	1952–75	587	Outstanding devotion to duty	
Pro Merito Medal (1967)	PMM	1967–75	374	Outstanding devotion to duty (other ranks)	
Danie Theron Medal		1970–2003		Diligent service in the Commandos	
Jack Hindon Medal		1970–1975	18	Diligent service in the Commandos (other ranks)	
Campaign medals
Korea Medal		1953		Service in the Korean War	
Commemorative Medals
Queen Elizabeth II Coronation Medal		1953		To commemorate the Coronation of Queen Elizabeth II	
Long Service Medals
Union Medal		1952–1961		18 years service in the Permanent Force	
Permanent Force Good Service Medal		1961–1975		18 years service in the Permanent Force	
John Chard Decoration	JCD	1952–2003		20 years service in the Citizen Force	
De Wet Decoration	DWD	1952–2003		20 years service in the Commandos	
John Chard Medal		1952–2003		12 years service in the Citizen Force	
Cadet Corps Medal		1966–1967		20 years service in school cadets	
Shooting Medals
Queen's Medal for Champion Shots		1953–1961		Winning the annual SADF shooting championships	
Commandant General's Medal		1965–1975		Winning the annual SADF shooting championships	
Emblems
Mentioned in dispatches		1967–2003			Pro Patria Medal (South Africa)
Commendation by the Chief of the SADF		1968–1974			

=== 1975–2003 ===
A new system was introduced in 1975. It retained seven of the existing decorations and medals. Innovations included a hierarchy of merit awards, cumulative long service medals, and colour-coded ribbons. As the South African Defence Force was engaged in military operations in South West Africa and Angola throughout the 1970s and 1980s, the number of awards granted each year increased significantly. Additional decorations were instituted between 1987 and 1991.

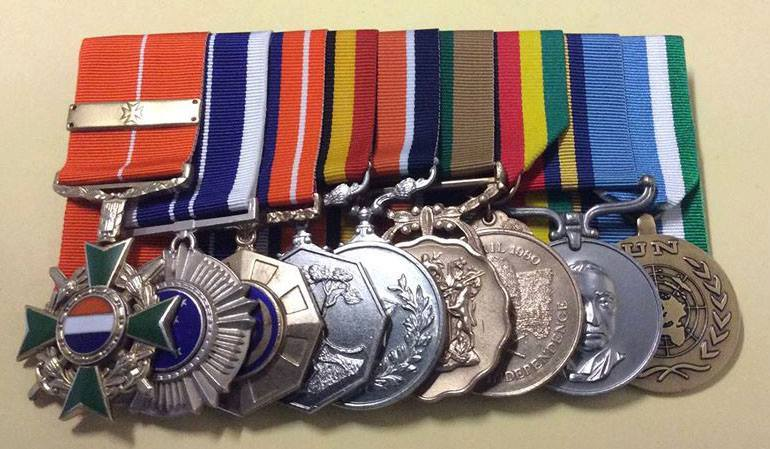
Major Arthur Walker HCG and Bar SM: Honoris Crux Gold and Bar, Southern Cross Medal, Pro Patria Medal, Southern Africa Medal, General Service Medal (South Africa), Good Service Medal, Bronze, Zimbabwean Independence Medal, General Service Medal (Rhodesia), and a United Nations medal for peacekeeping operations

Decoration Name	Post Nominals	Period current	Number awarded	Awarded for	Ribbon
Castle of Good Hope Decoration	CGH	1952–2003	Never awarded	Most conspicuous bravery	
Honoris Crux Diamond	HCD	1975–93	Never awarded	Death-defying heroic deeds of outstanding valour	
Honoris Crux Gold	HCG	1975–93	6	Outstanding bravery in extreme danger	
Star of South Africa, Gold	SSA	1975–2003		Meritorious military service.	
Star of South Africa, Silver	SSAS	1975–2003		Meritorious military service.	
Honoris Crux Silver	HCS	1975–2003	27	Exceptional bravery in great danger	
Honoris Crux (1975)	HC	1975–2003	201	Bravery while in danger	
Pro Virtute Decoration	PVD	1987–2003		Distinguished conduct and exceptional combat leadership (officers)	
Southern Cross Decoration	SD	1975–2003		Outstanding service of the highest order, and utmost devotion to duty (Officers)	
Pro Merito Decoration	PMD	1975–2003		Outstanding service of the highest order, and utmost devotion to duty (other ranks)	
Pro Virtute Medal	PVM	1987–2003	Never awarded	Distinguished conduct and exceptional combat leadership (other ranks)	
Ad Astra Decoration	AAD	1987–2003		Excellent flying skill or ingenuity by SA Air Force aircrew in emergencies or unusual situations	
Army Cross	CM	1991–2003		Exceptional courage, leadership, skill or ingenuity in dangerous or critical situations (army personnel)	
Air Force Cross	CA	1991–2003		Exceptional courage, leadership, skill or ingenuity in dangerous or critical situations (air force personnel)	
Navy Cross	CN	1991–2003		Exceptional courage, leadership, skill or ingenuity in dangerous or critical situations (naval personnel)	
Medical Service Cross	CC	1991–2003		Exceptional courage, leadership, skill or ingenuity in dangerous or critical situations (military health service personnel)	
Southern Cross Medal (1975)	SM	1975–2003		Exceptionally meritorious service and particular devotion to duty (officers)	
Pro Merito Medal (1975)	PMM	1975–2003		Exceptionally meritorious service and particular devotion to duty (other ranks)	
Danie Theron Medal	DTM	1970–2003		Exceptionally diligent and outstanding service in the Commandos	
Military Merit Medal	MMM	1974–2003		Service of a high order	
Campaign medals
Pro Patria Medal		1974–1992		Operational service in combating terrorism or in defence of South Africa	
Southern Africa Medal		1989		Service in military operations outside South Africa and South West Africa between 1976 and 1989	
General Service Medal		1992		Operational service inside South Africa from 1983	
Commemorative Medals
Unitas Medal		1994		To commemorate the amalgamation of the SADF, APLA, MK and the homeland defence forces to form the SA National Defence Force	
Long Service Medals
Medal for Distinguished Conduct and Loyal Service		1987–2003		40 years service in the Defence Force	
Good Service Medal, Gold		1975–2003		30 years service in the Permanent Force	
Good Service Medal, Silver		1975–2003		20 years service in the Permanent Force	
John Chard Decoration	JCD	1952–2003		20 years service in the Citizen Force	
De Wet Decoration	DWD	1952–2003		20 years service in the Commandos	
John Chard Medal		1952–2003		12 (from 1986, 10) years service in the Citizen Force	
Good Service Medal, Bronze		1975–2003		10 years service in the Permanent Force	
De Wet Medal		1987–2003		10 years service in the Commandos	
Shooting Medals
SADF Champion Shot Medal		1975–2003		Champion shots of the annual SADF Bisley in the categories of fullbore, smallbore, pistol and service shooting	
Cadet Corps Champion Shot Medal		1987–2003			
Emblems
Mentioned in Dispatches		1967–2003			
Emblem for Volunteer Service (South Africa)		1967–2003			

== Armed opposition organisations ==
In 1996, two separate sets of decorations were instituted for veterans who had served in the Azanian People's Liberation Army and Umkhonto we Sizwe during the armed campaign against the former government.

=== Azanian People's Liberation Army ===
Decoration Name	Post Nominals	Period current	Number awarded	Awarded for	Ribbon
Gold Star for Bravery	GSB	1996–2003		Exceptional bravery in great danger	
Bravery Star in Silver	BSS	1996–2003		Bravery	
Star for Conspicuous Leadership	SCL	1996–2003		Distinguished conduct and exceptional combat leadership	
Gold Decoration for Merit	GDM	1996–2003		Outstanding service and utmost devotion to duty	
Silver Medal for Merit	SMM	1996–2003		Exceptionally meritorious service and particular devotion to duty	
Bronze Medal for Merit	BMM	1996–2003		Service of a high order	
Campaign medals
Operational Medal for Southern Africa		1996–2003		Operational service outside South Africa	
South Africa Service Medal		1996–2003		Operational service inside South Africa	
Long Service medals
Gold Service Medal		1996–2003		30 years service in APLA	
Silver Service Medal		1996–2003		20 years service in APLA	
Bronze Service Medal		1996–2003		10 years service in APLA	

=== Umkhonto we Sizwe ===
Decoration Name	Post Nominals	Period current	Number awarded	Awarded for	Ribbon
Star for Bravery in Gold	SBG	1996–2003		Exceptional bravery in great danger	
Star for Bravery in Silver	SBS	1996–2003		Bravery	
Conspicuous Leadership Star	CLS	1996–2003		Distinguished conduct and exceptional combat leadership	
Decoration for Merit in Gold	GDMG	1996–2003		Outstanding service and utmost devotion to duty	
Merit Medal in Silver	MMS	1996–2003		Exceptionally meritorious service and particular devotion to duty	
Merit Medal in Bronze	MMB	1996–2003		Service of a high order	
Campaign medals
Operational Medal for Southern Africa		1996–2003		Operational service outside South Africa	
South Africa Service Medal		1996–2003		Operational service inside South Africa	
Long Service medals
Service Medal in Gold		1996–2003		30 years service in Umkhonto we Sizwe	
Service Medal in Silver		1996–2003		20 years service in Umkhonto we Sizwe	
Service Medal in Bronze		1996 –2003		10 years service in Umkhonto we Sizwe	

== South African National Defence Force ==
The South African National Defence Force, which was formed in 1994 by amalgamating the SADF, the liberation armies, and the military forces of the former homelands, used the SADF decorations and medals until 2003, when a new series of decorations was instituted:

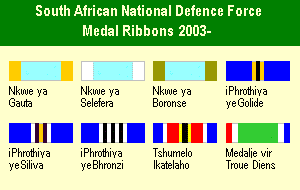

=== Bravery ===
- Nkwe ya Gauta (Golden Leopard) (NG)
- Nkwe ya Selefera (Silver Leopard) (NS)
- Nkwe ya Boronse (Bronze Leopard) (NB)

=== Superior Service ===
- iPhrothiya yeGolide (Golden Protea) (PG)
- iPhrothiya yeSiliva (Silver Protea) (PS)
- iPhrothiya yeBhronzi (Bronze Protea) (PB)

=== Campaign medal ===
- Tshumelo Ikatelaho (General Service Medal)

=== Commemoration Medal ===
- Commando Closure Commemoration Medal

=== Long service medal ===
- Medalje vir Troue Diens (Medal for Loyal Service) (10 Years)
- Medalje vir Troue Diens (Medal for Loyal Service) (20 Year Clasp)
- Medalje vir Troue Diens (Medal for Loyal Service) (30 Year Clasp)
- Medalje vir Troue Diens (Medal for Loyal Service) (40 Year Clasp)

=== Emblems ===
- Mentioned in Dispatches - Okhankanyiweyo (MID)
- Medal Ribbon for Loyal Service - with RD device (Reserve Distinction) (RD)
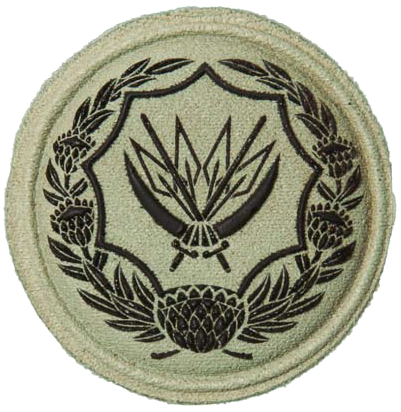
- Badge for Voluntary Reserve Force Service

=== Bars and Clasps ===
- Maluti Clasp (Operation BOLEAS)
- Tshumelo Ikatelaho (General Service Medal) (Peace Support clasp)
- Tshumelo Ikatelaho (General Service Medal) (Humanitarian Aid clasp)

== See also ==
- Orders, decorations, and medals of South Africa
- British and Commonwealth orders and decorations
- South African civil honours
- South African intelligence service decorations
- South African orders and decorations
- South African police decorations
- South African prisons decorations
