= Union of South Africa Queen's Medal for Bravery, Gold =

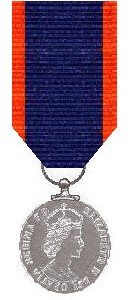
- Silver medal depicted
- Type: Civil decoration for bravery
- Awarded for: Acts of conspicuous bravery
- Country: UK South Africa
- Presented by: the Monarch of the United Kingdom and the Commonwealth realms
- Eligibility: South African citizens and others
- Status: Discontinued in 1961
- Established: 1952
- Ribbon bar

British & South African orders of wear
- Next (higher): UK precedence: Venerable Order of Saint John; SA precedence: Honoris Crux Gold
- Equivalent: Union of South Africa King's Medal for Bravery, Gold; Woltemade Decoration for Bravery, Gold
- Next (lower): UK succession: Distinguished Conduct Medal; SA succession: Woltemade Cross for Bravery, Gold

The Union of South Africa Queen's Medal for Bravery, Gold was the highest South African civilian decoration during the period from 1952 to 1961, while the country was still a constitutional monarchy in the British Commonwealth. The decoration was instituted by Queen Elizabeth II on 15 December 1952.

== Institution ==
The Union of South Africa Queen's Medal for Bravery, Gold, the senior of two classes of South Africa's highest civilian decoration for bravery, was instituted by Royal Warrant of 15 December 1952, published in Government Gazette no. 5013 dated 27 February 1953. The medal replaced the Union of South Africa King's Medal for Bravery, Gold, after the accession to the British Throne of Queen Elizabeth II on 6 February 1952.

== Award criteria ==
The earlier King's Medal for Bravery, Gold was awarded to recognise acts of gallantry performed in the face of imminent and obvious peril by those residents of the Union of South Africa or its dependent territories who endangered their lives in the act of saving, or endeavouring to save, the lives of others. Upon the institution of the Queen's Medal for Bravery, Gold, the conditions of eligibility that had applied to the King's Medal were expanded to include non-citizens of the Union for acts of gallantry within the Union or while saving or endeavouring to save the lives of citizens of the Union elsewhere.

== Order of wear ==
In the British order of precedence, the Union of South Africa Queen's Medal for Bravery, Gold ranks as a second-level decoration, equivalent to the George Medal. It is preceded by the Venerable Order of Saint John and succeeded by the Distinguished Conduct Medal.

In South Africa, the medal is ranked as a first-level decoration and, despite its status, it has no post-nominal letters. It is preceded by the Honoris Crux Gold and succeeded by the Woltemade Cross for Bravery, Gold.

The medal ranks on par with the earlier Union of South Africa King's Medal for Bravery, Gold and the subsequent Woltemade Decoration for Bravery, Gold (instituted in May 1970).

== Description ==
Obverse
The decoration is silver-gilt and is a disk, 38 millimetres in diameter with a raised rim and a large ring suspender. The obverse depicts the crowned effigy of Queen Elizabeth II, facing right and surrounded by the words "ELIZABETH II DEI GRATIA REGINA F. D."

Reverse
The reverse is identical to that of the King's Medal for Bravery, Gold and depicts the 18th-century Cape hero Wolraad Woltemade on his horse, rescuing shipwreck survivors from a stormy sea. The image is circumscribed around the top in English and Afrikaans with the words "FOR BRAVERY • VIR DAPPERHEID".

Ribbon
The ribbon is also identical to that of the King's Medal for Bravery, Gold, 44 millimetres wide and dark blue with 4½ millimetres wide orange edges.

== Discontinuation ==
The Union of South Africa Queen's Medal for Bravery, Gold was never awarded and the decoration was discontinued upon the establishment of the Republic of South Africa on 31 May 1961. It was succeeded by the Woltemade Decoration for Bravery, Gold that was instituted on 20 May 1970.
