= Vollrath (name) =

Vollrath is both a masculine German given name and a surname. Notable people with the name include:

- Calvin Vollrath (born 1960), Canadian fiddler and composer
- Jacob Vollrath (1824–1898), American businessman
- Patrick Vollrath (born 1985), German filmmaker
- Vollrath von Hellermann (1900–1971), German military officer
- Vollrath Lübbe (1894–1969), German military officer
- Vollrath Tham (1913–1995), Swedish military officer
- Frederick E. Vollrath (1940–2017), United States Army general
