= Castle of Good Hope Decoration =

Unused military decoration by the Union of South Africa

- Type: Military decoration for bravery
- Awarded for: Most conspicuous bravery
- Country: South Africa
- Presented by: the Monarch of the United Kingdom and the Commonwealth realms and, from 1961, the State President
- Eligibility: All Ranks
- Post-nominals: CGH
- Status: Discontinued in 2003
- Established: 1952
- First award: Never awarded
- Ribbon bar

The Castle of Good Hope Decoration was a military decoration for bravery which was instituted by the Union of South Africa on 6 April 1952, but never awarded. The decoration was intended for award to members of the South African Defence Force for a single act of valour or most conspicuous bravery or some daring or pre-eminent act of self-sacrifice or extreme devotion to duty in the presence of the enemy.

== Institution ==
The Castle of Good Hope Decoration was instituted by Queen Elizabeth II on 6 April 1952, during the Tercentenary Van Riebeeck Festival, as the most senior of a series of military decorations and medals which substituted many of the British and Commonwealth awards which had earlier been used.

== Award criteria ==
The Castle of Good Hope Decoration could be awarded to members of the South African Defence Force for a signal act of valour or most conspicuous bravery or some daring or pre-eminent act of self-sacrifice or extreme devotion to duty in the presence of the enemy in wartime. A Bar could be awarded for a further similar deed of bravery. It was the most senior of all South African orders, decorations and medals from 1952 to 2003. It was formally authorised by Queen Elizabeth II on 26 January 1953 as a South African substitute for the Victoria Cross (VC), for which South African servicemen had previously been eligible.

In 1986, during the undeclared 1966-1989 Border War, the restriction to wartime acts was removed to make the decoration available to reward actions during other military operations.

The Castle of Good Hope Decoration still appeared in the official order of precedence table which was published on 3 September 1993 but, since it was never awarded and was officially discontinued on 27 April 2003, it was no longer listed when a new table was published on 11 March 2005.

== Description ==
Obverse

The Castle of Good Hope Decoration was a gold pentagon representing the outline of South Africa's oldest military building, the Castle of Good Hope in Cape Town. The obverse shows Van Riebeeck's three ships sailing into Table Bay in 1652, framed in a double ring, the inner ring decorated with a wreath of proteas and the outer inscribed "CASTEEL DE GOEDE HOOP DEKORASIE" at the top and "CASTLE OF GOOD HOPE DECORATION" at the bottom.

Reverse

The reverse had the pre-2000 South African coat of arms and Queen Elizabeth's royal cipher (E II R) above the coat of arms. Only one decoration was struck.

Bar

The bar was of gold with a miniature replica of the Castle of Good Hope embossed in the centre.

Ribbon

The ribbon was 44 millimetres wide and green. The Castle of Good Hope Decoration was designed to be worn around the neck, but since a new specimen would have to be made without the royal cipher on the reverse in any event, should it ever be awarded, it was decided in 1991 to alter it to a chest decoration. The alteration never became necessary.

== Discontinuation ==
The Castle of Good Hope Decoration was never awarded and now never will be. Conferment of the decoration was discontinued in respect of services performed on or after 27 April 2003.
