= Orders, decorations, and medals of Transkei =

The Transkeian honours system was instituted after the South African bantustan of Transkei was declared independent in 1976.

A range of orders, decorations, and medals were instituted including the Military Rule Medal,1987

Since 1994, when Transkei was reincorporated into the Republic of South Africa, the obsolete Transkeian honours system has now been given a place within the South African order of wear.

== See also ==
- Military Rule Medal, 1987
