= Order of the Southern Cross (South Africa) =

South African order

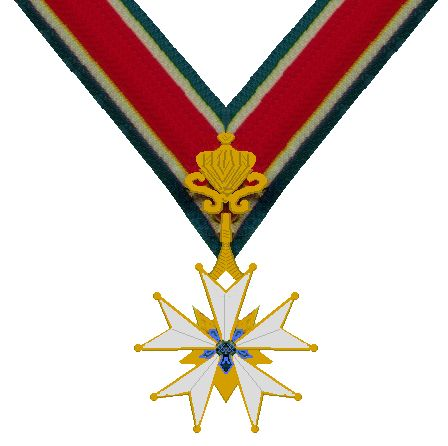
Insignia of the Order of the Southern Cross

The Order of the Southern Cross, also known as the Order of the Southern Star, is an award of the Republic of South Africa established in 1973. The order was discontinued in 2002. The ribbon is red with two broad white and blue stripes. This order of chivalry is awarded only to foreigners and is intended for "conspicuous and exceptional services to South Africa" (for singular and exceptional achievement).

Nobel Prize winners, physician Christiaan Barnard who was the first to successfully transplant a human heart, ANC chairman Oliver Tambo and Chief Luthuli wear or wore this cross in gold. The writer Nadine Gordimer, Es'kia Mphahlele and the palaeontologist Phillip Tobias received the silver cross.

The decoration has the shape of a white star with five arms and ten points and five golden points between the arms. A blue flower is placed in the middle. A golden ornament serves as a heightening and connection to the ribbon.
