= South African Railways Police =

The South African Railway Police was a specialised law enforcement agency in South Africa, originally established in 1934 to police the country's railways, harbours and later international airports.

== Other units ==
On 24 October 1975, a new unit within SARP was formed, the South African Railways Police Special Task Force, its mission to end hostage takeovers in ships, buses, aircraft, buildings, and trains. They were train at the South African Infantry School with the trained embers dispersed around the country. In 1980, a reorganisation of the unit and further special forces training was organised under Brigadier A.F. Horak, with unit spread around the country. The only operation the unit was known to be involved in was the ending of the Air India hijacking in Durban in 1981. The unit was disbanded in 1986 and integrated into the police service.

== Dissolution ==
On the 1st of October 1986, the South African Railway Police was disbanded. All its functions, personnel, and logistical assets were amalgamated into the South African Police. As a result, the specialised role once performed by the Railway Police was absorbed into the wider law enforcement framework of the country.
