= Westdene dam disaster =

1985 school bus accident in South Africa

Coordinates: 26°10′45″S 27°59′28″E

- Date: 27 March 1985
- Location: Johannesburg, South Africa
- Type: School bus accident
- Deaths: 42

The Westdene dam disaster was a bus crash that took place in Westdene, near Johannesburg, South Africa, on 27 March 1985. Of the 72 occupants, 42 drowned inside the submerged bus and two were declared deceased shortly after being taken to a nearby hospital. The remaining 30, including the bus driver, were rescued.

== Crash ==
The driver of a double-decker bus, 41-year-old Willem Horne, lost control and the bus crashed through barriers into the Westdene dam, a few kilometres from the centre of Johannesburg. A witness said it appeared that a tyre had blown out, sending the bus swerving into another vehicle before it smashed through a fence and plunged into the reservoir. The bus was transporting students, aged 13 to 17, from a local high school (Hoërskool Vorentoe). A student said the bus initially stayed upright but then sank almost immediately with everything happening in about 30 seconds.

A survivor recounted years later that the passengers were in high spirits and the bus seemed to be travelling at a higher than normal speed, when it suddenly swerved and went nose first into the dam. She swam out via a back window and made it to the top of the bus, which was covered by about 30cm of water, before attempting to turn around for her friends and sister, but stopped when she noticed they were pale and looked like mannequins. Another survivor said most of the students were hysterical and panicked, causing a turmoil of people trying to escape the bus.

A local who lived near the dam recounted that after the crash they had yelled to their grandmother: "A bus went into the dam: come and see" causing their grandmother to run towards the crash to help. Another local attempting to help said students were coming to the surface in ones and twos, but after a few minutes they stopped coming to the surface. Another, who lived opposite the dam and was doing their emergency medicine attachment, heard a woman yelling and saw a handful of people in the water and some on a submerged bus. About 3,000 people, including dozens of tearful and hysterical parents, gathered near the scene as doctors and nurses battled to revive children pulled from the submerged bus. Police said 40 students drowned in the bus and two died later in hospital. Children travelling in another bus said some students trapped on the upper deck managed to break windows and swim to safety.

The bus was hauled out of the water by a crane with the entire operation lasting about three hours. A team of divers retrieved bodies of those in the submerged bus, with schoolbags, briefcases and school books also being retrieved.

== Investigation ==
The driver, Willem Horne, could not remember what had happened and was acquitted.

== Casualties ==
A teacher made preliminary identifications of the deceased victims to attempt to spare the parents from having to view the bodies. The following children lost their lives in the disaster:

- Blignaut, Anna (13)
- Botha, Anne-Lize (15)
- Botha, Henrietta (16)
- Brown, Caroline (unknown)
- Coetzee, Denise (16)
- Dreyer, Hendrik Johannes (13)
- Du Plooy, Linda (15)
- Du Plooy, Reinett (16)
- Du Toit, Francois (13)
- Els, Jakobus (14)
- Erasmus, Karen (16)
- Fritz, Francina (14)
- Horn, Adriana (13)
- Hurwitz, Jacqueline (13)
- Jacobs, Anel (16)
- Jooste, Lelanie (14)
- Kleinhans, Adre (17)
- Koen, Petrus Lucas (17)
- Kruger, Clasina Inalize (16)
- Kruger, Maria Catharina (14)
- Lira, Riaan (unknown)
- Ludick, Madeleine (12)
- Mans, Cornelius (14)
- Marshall, Elmarie (16)
- Marx, Conrad (16)
- McLaughlin, Belinda (15)
- Meyer, Catharina Maria (14)
- Miles, Mary-Ann (16)
- Morris, Anna Jacoba (14)
- Ouwenkamp, Albertus (13)
- Pieters, Tanya (15)
- Pretorius, Connie (17)
- Pretorius, Elizabeth Marlene (15)
- Rautenbach/Buitendag, Thelma (unknown)
- Reynders, Hester (15)
- Strydom, Charl (13)
- Swanepoel, Vinette (13)
- Swart, Andries Johannes (13)
- Van Der Westhuizen, Petrus Coenrad (13)
- Van Heerden, Elsa (17)
- Van Tonder, Anna Christina (14)
- Venter, Deon Andre (16)

The minister of health and welfare, Nak van der Merwe, announced a special fund that was to be used to help cover funeral costs for parents of victims. Of the 42 fatalities, 39 were given a public mass funeral and buried in separate graves in the "Heroes Acre" at Westpark Cemetery on 1 April 1985, while two of the deceased were cremated and their ashes given to their families, and one victim was returned to her native Orkney, North West and interred at a cemetery there.

== Aftermath ==
The bus driver, Willem Horne, had to be placed under police protection when a father of one of the deceased victims showed up at the hospital and demanded to know where the driver was. The Johannesburg municipal bus depot had several African drivers who reported persistent insults by Caucasian passengers since the crash and they had received complaints about the quality of the African drivers.

== Legacy ==
An annual memorial service is held every 27 March at Johannesburg's Vorentoe High School, where most of the victims and survivors had attended school.

In 2013 an investigation was opened by the South African Human Rights Commission into comments posted by former Daily Sun journalist Zama Khumalo that mocked the incident, after Khumalo posted that he would hold a celebration over the tragedy. Khumalo later stated that he was unaware the victims were children and had recently read about the celebrations of the deaths of black people during apartheid and felt angry at the difference he saw between the historical events.
