= South African Police Cross for Bravery =

SA Police Cross for Bravery - 1st Type
- Ribbon: 44mm, blue, with a white-gold-white centre panel.
- Type: Decoration
- Awarded for: Conspicuous and exceptional gallantry
- Country: Republic of South Africa
- Presented by: South African Police
- Eligibility: All ranks
- Status: Discontinued 1989

The South African Police Cross for Bravery was a high-ranking decoration, that existed between 1963 and 2004. It initially had only one class, but it was expanded to three classes in 1988.

== First type ==
Instituted on 20 May 1963, retrospective to 31 May 1961, the decoration was awarded to all ranks of the South African Police, for conspicuous and exceptional bravery in the execution of duties, or in protecting or saving life or property. Recipients were entitled to the post-nominal letters PCF, standing for Praefecturae Crux Fortitudinis, the Latin form of the name.

The PCF is a gold cross, each arm built up in five stepped layers. In the centre is a narrow cross on a gyronny background inside a blue circlet inscribed Vivit Post Funera Virtus (Courage lives on after death) within a green laurel wreath. The reverse depicts the national coat of arms and the words "Vir Dapperheid" and "For Bravery". The ribbon is blue with a white-gold-white centre panel, and is worn around the neck.

== Second type ==
SA Police Cross for Bravery - 2nd Type
- Ribbon: 32mm, blue, with a gold centre stripe flanked by one (PCFG), two (PCFS) or three (PCF) white stripes.
- Type: Decoration
- Awarded for: Outstanding bravery (PCFG); or exceptional bravery (PCFS); or bravery (PCF)
- Country: Republic of South Africa
- Presented by: South African Police
- Eligibility: All ranks
- Status: Discontinued 2004

In 1989, the PCF was divided into three classes, corresponding to the military Honoris Crux, Honoris Crux Silver, and Honoris Crux Gold:

- SAP Cross for Bravery Gold (PCFG): for outstanding bravery while in extreme danger,
- SAP Cross for Bravery Silver (PCFS): for exceptional bravery while in great danger,
- SAP Cross for Bravery (PCF): for bravery while in danger.

The decoration was reduced in size to be worn on the chest, and additional white stripes were used to distinguish the ribbons of the new second and third classes.

The decoration was superseded by the SA Police Service Gold Cross for Bravery and SA Police Service Silver Cross for Bravery on 4 May 2004.

== See also ==
- South African civil honours
- South African police decorations
