= Jonge Thomas =

Dutch ship (1764–1773)

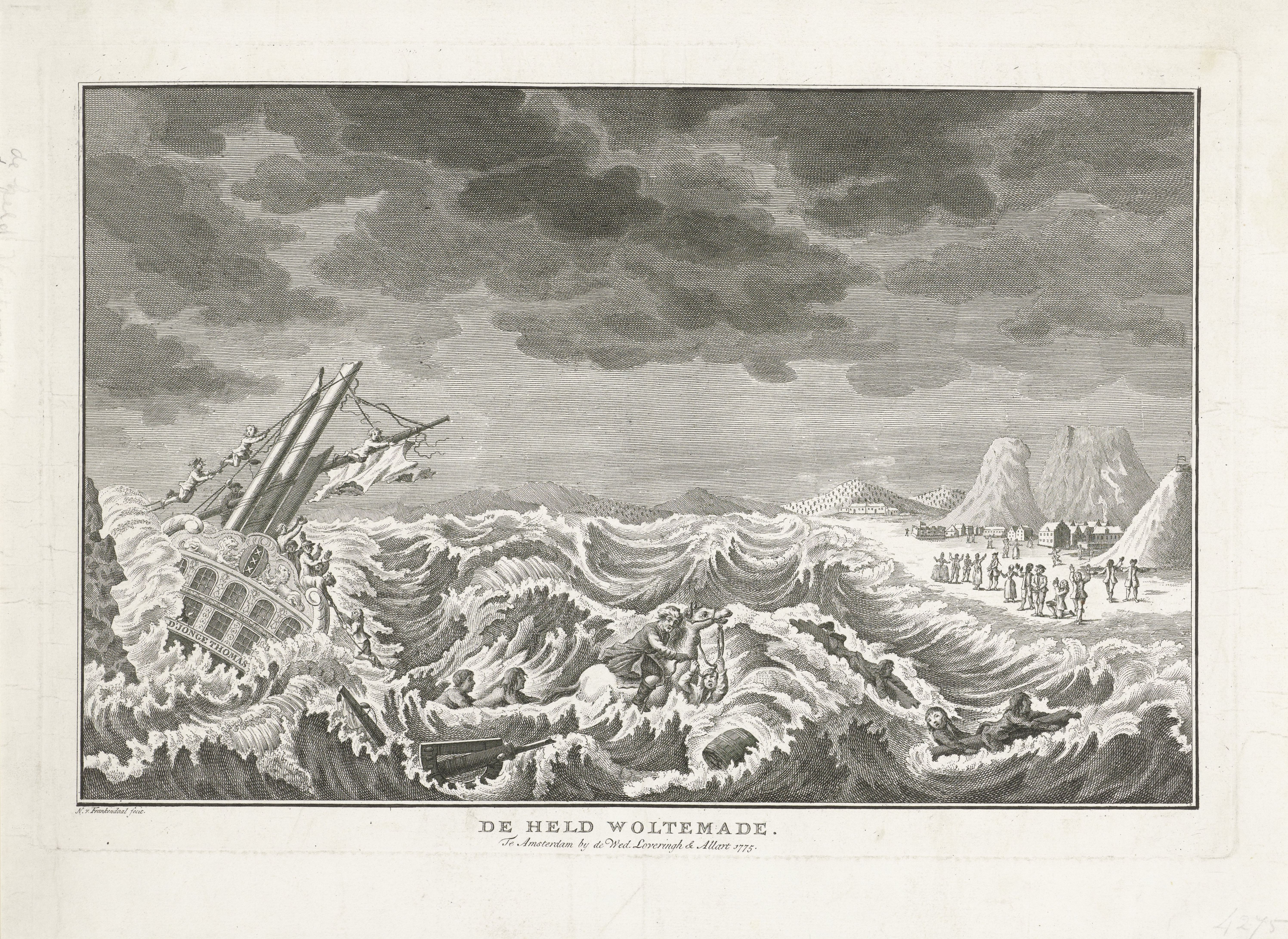
- Jonge Thomas in distress in 1773

History

Dutch Republic
- Name: Jonge Thomas
- Owner: Dutch East India Company; Chamber of Amsterdam
- Completed: 1764
- Fate: Wrecked on 25 July 1773

General characteristics
- Type: East Indiaman
- Length: 150 feet
- Capacity: loading capacity: 1150 tons
- Crew: 296-360

Jonge Thomas, also written as De Jonge Thomas was an 18th-century East Indiaman of the Dutch East India Company.

Jonge Thomas was a merchant ship who sailed several times to the Dutch East Indies and China. During her fourth voyage she wrecked at Table Bay. Wolraad Woltemade and his horse successfully entered the water seven times and rescued fourteen people. He and his horse died during the eighth attempt. The ship had 296-360 crew members, hundred of whom would have drowned.

A range of depictions were made of the sinking of the ship and the rescue operation; multiple of them are in the Yale Center for British Art collection and collection of the Rijksmuseum in Amsterdam.

== Ship details ==
Jonge Thomas was built in 1764 in Amsterdam for the Chamber of Amsterdam. She was made of wood and was 150 feet long. She had a loading capacity of 1150 tons and a capacity for up to 360 crew members.

== History and fate ==
On 25 October 1765 she made her first voyage to Batavia under command of Jacob Wiebe. She had an intermediate stop at Cape of Good Hope for two weeks in March 1766 and arrived at Batavia on 25 June 1766. She continued the same year to Canton, China.

In total the ship completed three voyages to the Dutch East Indies.

During her fourth voyage to the Dutch East Indies, storm she lost her anchors during a storm and ran aground on a sand bar at Table Bay near Cape of Good Hope. Many lives were lost as the ship started to break up but a substantial number of survivors were left clinging to the hull. The stricken ship was not too far from dry land and many sailors attempted to swim ashore. Most of those who did so perished; the water was cold and the current from the nearby Salt River too great. Except for the very strongest swimmers, those who headed for the shore were carried out to sea.

== Aftermath ==
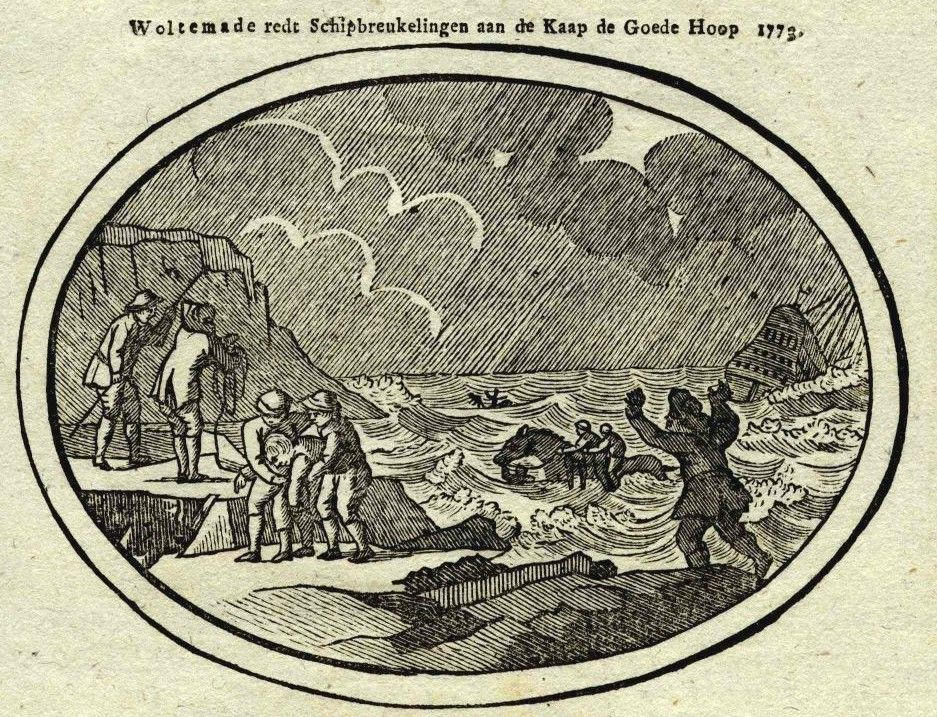
Catchpenny print: rescuing people with in the background the sinking Jonge Thomas

A crowd of spectators stood on the beach. Some came to watch, others to try to help and yet others were hoping to loot the cargo that was being washed ashore. A detachment of soldiers was in attendance to keep order among the spectators. Governor Joachim van Plettenberg sent 30 soldiers to the beach, to guard the ship and prevent washed-up cargo from being stolen. Wolraad Woltemade, father of one of the soldiers, went to the beach to bring him food. After seeing the sinking ship he went with his horse into the water. Seven times he returned out of the water rescuing fourteen people; two people every time. During the eight rescue attempt he drowned with his horse due to fatigue and due to desperate sailors who cling to the horse.

He became famous for his heroic deed. Among others in 1774 a VOC ship was named after him, and a statue was made of him.

== Depictions ==
A number of depictions were made of the disaster of Jonge Thomas, multiple of them are now in collections of museums, the Yale Center for British Art collection and collection of the Rijksmuseum in Amsterdam.

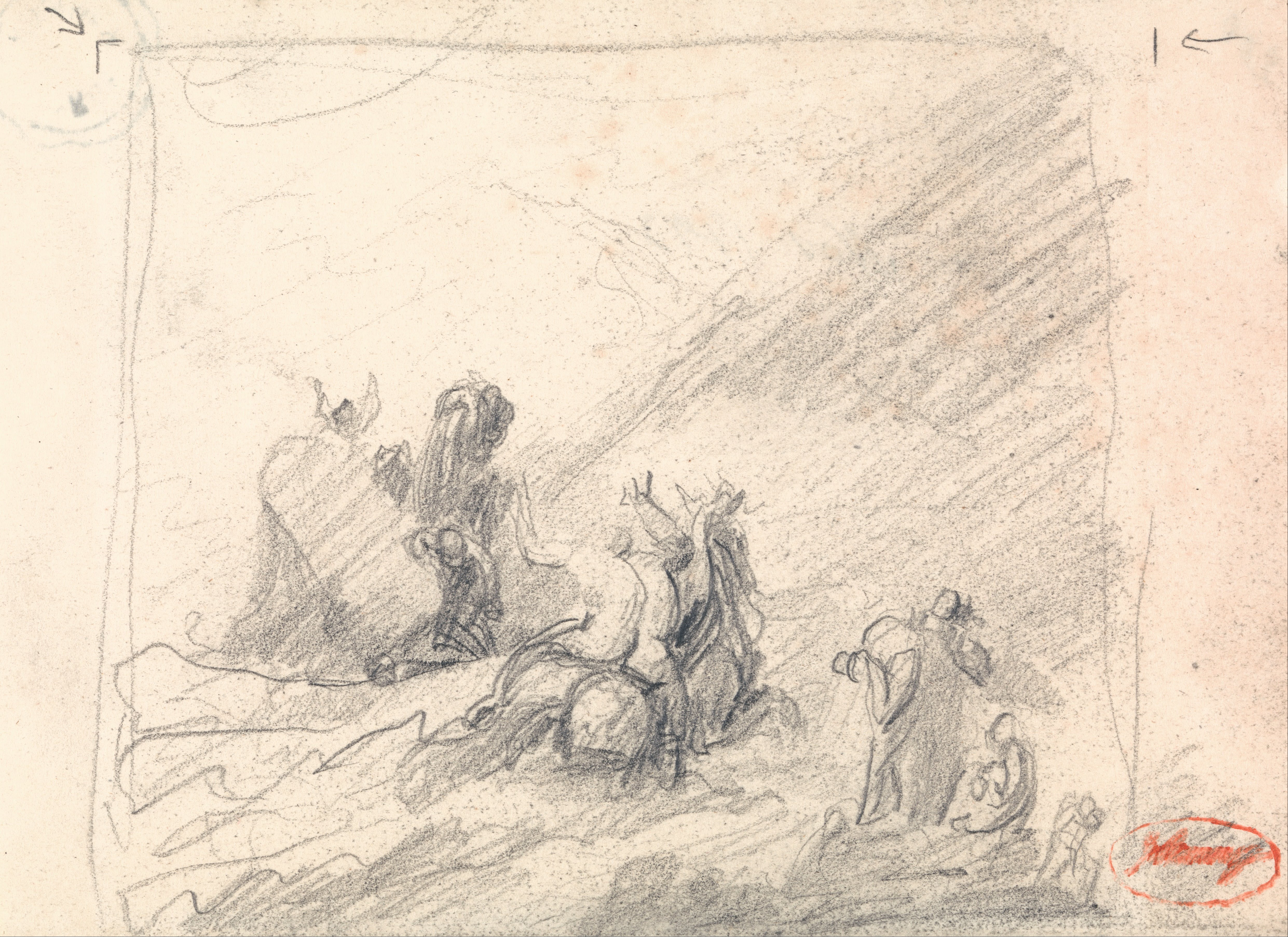
Drawing by George Romney
(Yale Center for British Art collection)

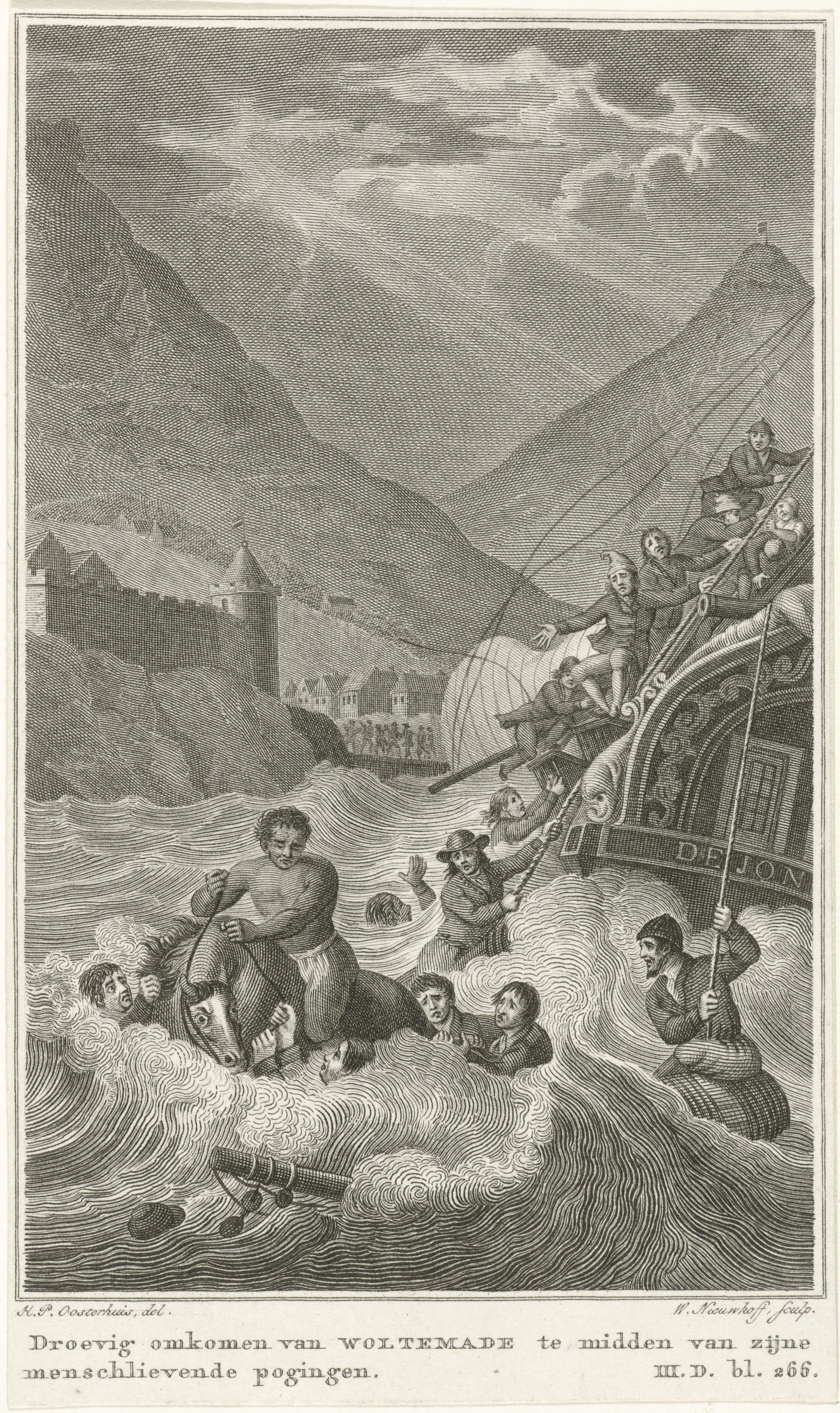
Drawing by Walraad Nieuwhoff, after Haatje Pieters Oosterhuis
(Rijksmuseum collection)

== Wreck ==
The wreck is protected under the National Heritage Resources Act, No. 25 of 1999. The wreck of Jonge Thomas was reportedly salvaged by the African Salvage Corporation Ltd. However more information about the salvaging has not been published.
