= Union of South Africa King's Medal for Bravery, Gold =

- Type: Civil decoration for bravery
- Awarded for: Acts of conspicuous bravery
- Country: UK South Africa
- Presented by: the Monarch of the United Kingdom and the Dominions of the British Commonwealth, and Emperor of India
- Eligibility: South African citizens
- Status: Discontinued in 1952
- Established: 1939

Highlights
- Total: 1
- Ribbon bar

British & South African orders of wear
- Next (higher): UK precedence: Venerable Order of Saint John; SA precedence: Honoris Crux Gold
- Equivalent: Union of South Africa Queen's Medal for Bravery, Gold; Woltemade Decoration for Bravery, Gold
- Next (lower): UK succession: Distinguished Conduct Medal; SA succession: Woltemade Cross for Bravery, Gold

The Union of South Africa King's Medal for Bravery, Gold was the highest South African civilian decoration during the period between 1910 and 1961, when the country was a constitutional monarchy in the British Commonwealth. The medal was instituted by King George VI on 23 June 1939.

== Institution ==
The (Union of South Africa) King's Medal for Bravery, Gold, the senior of two classes of South Africa's highest civilian decoration for bravery, was instituted by Royal Warrant of 23 June 1939, published in Government Gazette no. 2671 dated 25 August 1939, and amended by Royal Warrants of 18 February 1947, 24 October 1949 and 17 October 1950.

The decoration filled the gap left by the withdrawal of British awards such as the Albert Medal and the Edward Medal, which had ceased to be available to South Africans in 1934. It predated the institution of the George Cross and George Medal in 1940, for which South Africans were eligible.

== Award criteria ==
The medal was awarded to recognise great and exceptional gallantry performed in the face of imminent and obvious peril by residents of the Union of South Africa or its dependent territories who endangered their lives in the act of saving, or endeavouring to save, the lives of others.

== Order of wear ==
In the British order of precedence, the Union of South Africa King's Medal for Bravery, Gold ranks as a second level decoration, equivalent to the George Medal. It is preceded by the Venerable Order of Saint John and succeeded by the Distinguished Conduct Medal.

In South Africa, the medal is ranked as a first level decoration but, despite its status, it has no post-nominal letters. It is preceded by the Honoris Crux Gold and succeeded by the Woltemade Cross for Bravery, Gold.

== Description ==
Obverse
The decoration is silver-gilt and is a disk, 38 millimetres in diameter with a raised rim and a large ring suspender. The obverse depicts the crowned effigy of King George VI, facing left, surrounded by the words "GEORGIVS VI REX ET IMPERATOR" around the upper perimeter.

Reverse
A public competition was held to find a suitable design for the reverse of the medal. The winning entry, by Miss Renee Joubert, depicts the 18th-century Cape hero Wolraad Woltemade on his horse, rescuing shipwreck survivors from a stormy sea. As a result, the medal became commonly referred to as the "Woltemade Medal". The image is circumscribed with the words "FOR BRAVERY • VIR DAPPERHEID" around the top.

Ribbon
The ribbon is 44 millimetres wide and dark blue with 4½ millimetres wide orange edges.

== Discontinuation ==
Upon the accession to the British Throne of Queen Elizabeth II on 15 December 1952, the Union of South Africa King's Medal for Bravery, Gold was discontinued and replaced by the Union of South Africa Queen's Medal for Bravery, Gold.

== Recipient ==
The Union of South Africa King's Medal for Bravery, Gold was awarded only once, on 8 September 1944 to Luis Freixial. Luis was fourteen years old on 6 January 1943 when he rescued the two-year-old Cody Law from a 40 feet deep well with deep water into which he had fallen at Parys in the Orange Free State.
