= Wolraad Woltemade =

Cape Dutch dairy farmer; famous for saving lives in a shipwreck in 1773

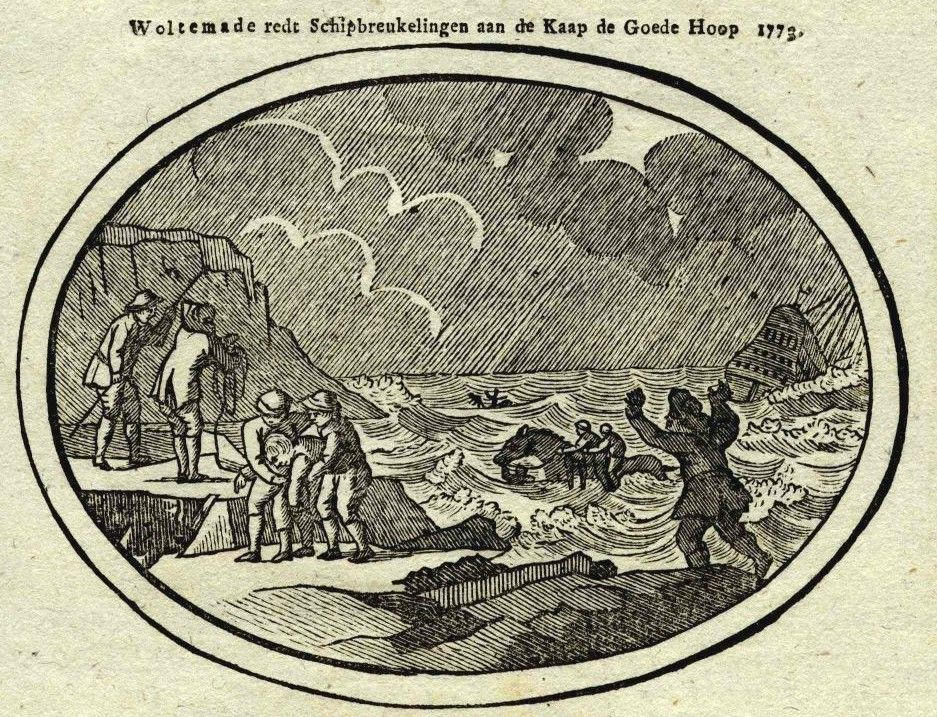
- 18th century drawing depicting Wolraad Woltemade's rescue of 14 sailors
- Born: 1708
- Died: 1 June 1773 (aged 64–65); At the mouth of the Salt River, near Cape Town, Dutch Cape Colony
- Monuments: Wolraad Woltemade statue, near Woltemade Trainstation, Cape Town
- Occupation: Dairy farmer
- Known for: Afrikaans folklore
- Spouse: Janna Charlotta Woltemade
- Children: 1

Wolraad Woltemade (1708 – 1 June 1773) was a Cape Dutch dairy farmer, who died while rescuing sailors from the wreck of the ship De Jonge Thomas in Table Bay on 1 June 1773. The story was reported by the Swedish naturalist Carl Peter Thunberg who was in South Africa as a surgeon for the Dutch East India Company at the time.

== Early life ==
Woltemade was born in 1701, part of present-day northwestern Germany. He migrated to the Dutch settlement at Cape Town (Kaapstad) and worked for the VOC as a soldier and after retirement as keeper of the menagerie of the company or as a dairyman. Many of the earliest European colonies were established by commercial companies, rather than through the direct intervention of the governments of European nations.

== Ship destruction ==
On the morning of 1 June 1773, the start of winter in the southern hemisphere, a sailing ship named De Jonge Thomas was driven ashore in a gale onto a sand bar at the mouth of the Salt River in Table Bay. Many lives were lost as the ship started to break up but a substantial number of survivors were left clinging to the hull. The stricken ship was not too far from dry land and many sailors attempted to swim ashore. Most of those who did so perished; the water was cold and the current from the nearby Salt River too great. Except for the very strongest swimmers, those who headed for the shore were carried out to sea.

A crowd of spectators stood on the beach. Some came to watch, others to try to help and yet others were hoping to loot the cargo that was being washed ashore. A detachment of soldiers was in attendance to keep order among the spectators. Corporal Christian Ludwig Woltemade, the youngest son of the elderly Wolraad, was among those standing guard. As daylight came, Wolraad left his home, Klein Zoar on horseback, taking provisions to his son.

== Rescue ==
As Woltemade reached the beach, he was filled with pity for the sailors marooned aboard the wreck. Seeing that nothing could be done by those on the beach, he mounted his horse, Vonk, and urged the animal into the sea. As they approached the wreck, Woltemade turned the horse and called for two men to jump into the sea and grasp the horse's tail. After a moment of hesitation, two men threw themselves into the water and did so, whereupon Woltemade urged the horse forward and dragged them to shore. Woltemade rode out seven times, bringing back fourteen men. By this time he and his horse were exhausted, but at that moment, as they rested, the ship began to collapse. Woltemade once more urged his horse into the water but by now the desperation amongst the sailors was tremendous. Seeing this as probably their last chance to escape before the ship was destroyed, six men plunged into the sea, grabbing at the horse. Their weight was too much for the exhausted steed; all were dragged below the waves and drowned.

Woltemade's body was found the next day, but the horse was not found.

Of the 191 souls on board, only 53 survived and of these 14 were saved by Woltemade.

== Honour ==
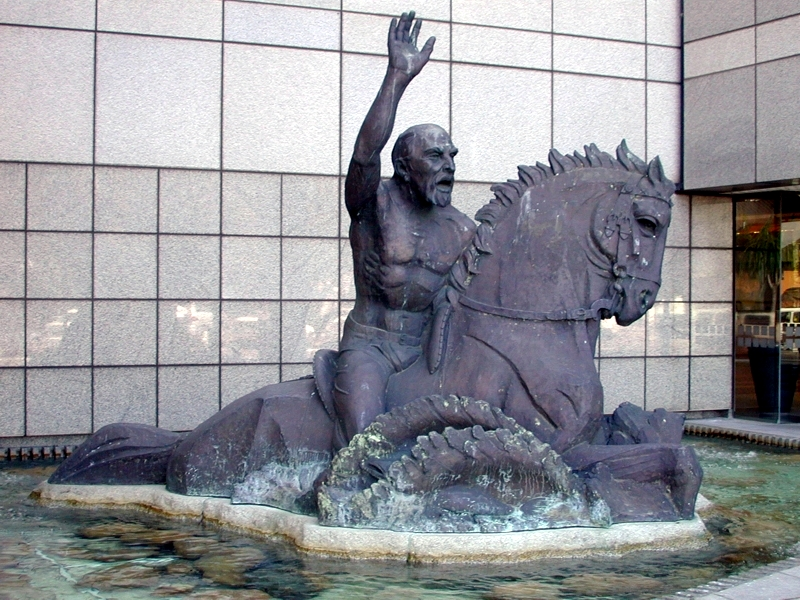
Statue of Wolraad Woltemade at Old Mutual Headquarters in Pinelands, South Africa.

Woltemade did not immediately become a hero. The Captain (van Lammeren) of de Jonge Thomas was given an official funeral, but there was nothing so grand for Woltemade. The general opinion at the Castle seems to have been that he was an officious fool who had lost his life unnecessarily. In the first report to Holland, his name is not even mentioned – though considerable space is devoted to the eighteen boxes of money providentially saved. This gold was the reason the flotilla had been allowed into Table Bay in the first place, as transporting it by land from Simons Town to The Castle would have been too dangerous given the poor roads, made worse (impassable) by the storm. However, Karl Thunberg, who had witnessed the event, did not forget Woltemade; nor did the formers countryman, Anders Sparrman, when he wrote his famous book "A Voyage to the Cape of Good Hope" in 1775." The VOC (Dutch East India Company) did eventually compensate his dependants, but it took a few years of public outcry to do so.

The Dutch East India Company provided amply for his widow and children and named a ship Held Woldemade, taken by the British fleet as prize during the battle in Saldanha Bay on 4 July 1781. A railway station in Cape Town is named after him. The Union of South Africa King's Medal for Bravery, instituted in 1939, bore a depiction of Woltemade's heroic act on its obverse. In 1970 the Woltemade Decoration for Bravery was instituted as the highest civilian decoration for bravery in South Africa. This was replaced in 1988 by the Woltemade Cross for Bravery. The Woltemade Cross was discontinued in 2002, as part of the move towards establishing a new South African honours system, following the advent of majority rule.

The name also was given to the S.A. Wolraad Woltemade, one of a pair of salvage tugs built in 1976, which at the time were the most powerful tugs in the world.

== The name ==
Wolraad is a version of the German name Vollrad (from "Volkrat"), sometimes also spelled Wolrad, and means "councillor of the people". Woltemad(e) is the spelling variation used by Thunberg for the Low German family name Woltemate ("Wohlgemut" in High German, meaning "light-hearted", or more literally "of a good disposition"), and a familiar connection with the Woltemate family of artists from the same region in Germany in which the name "Wolrad" one was written

== Gallery ==
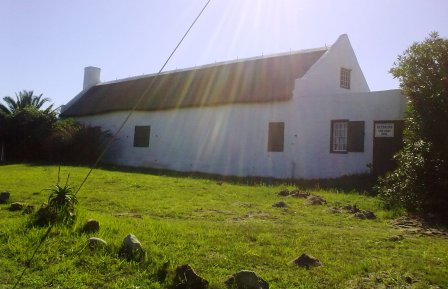
Klein Zoar is alleged to have been the house of Woltemade

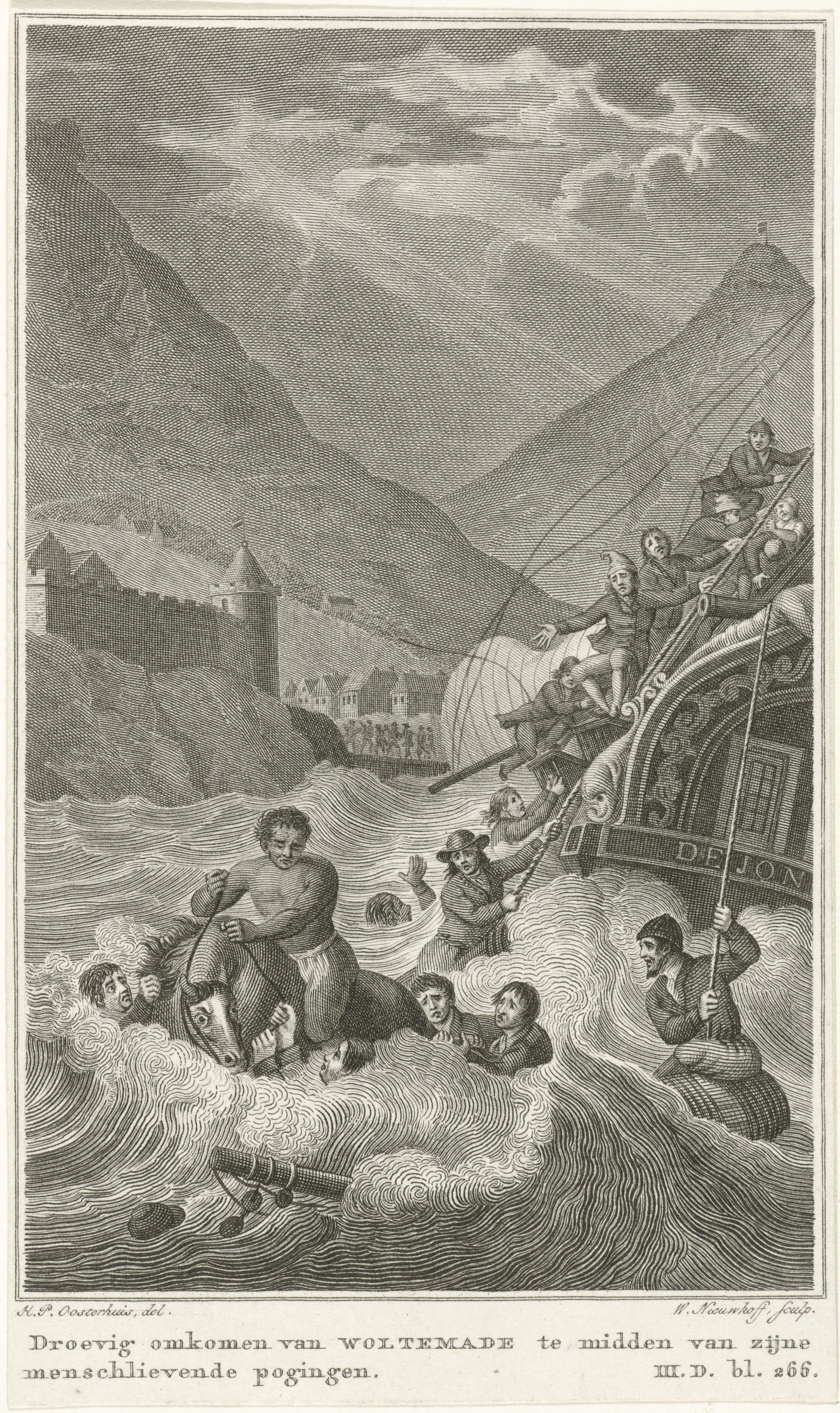
Heroic death of Woltemade at the Cape of Good Hope, 1773

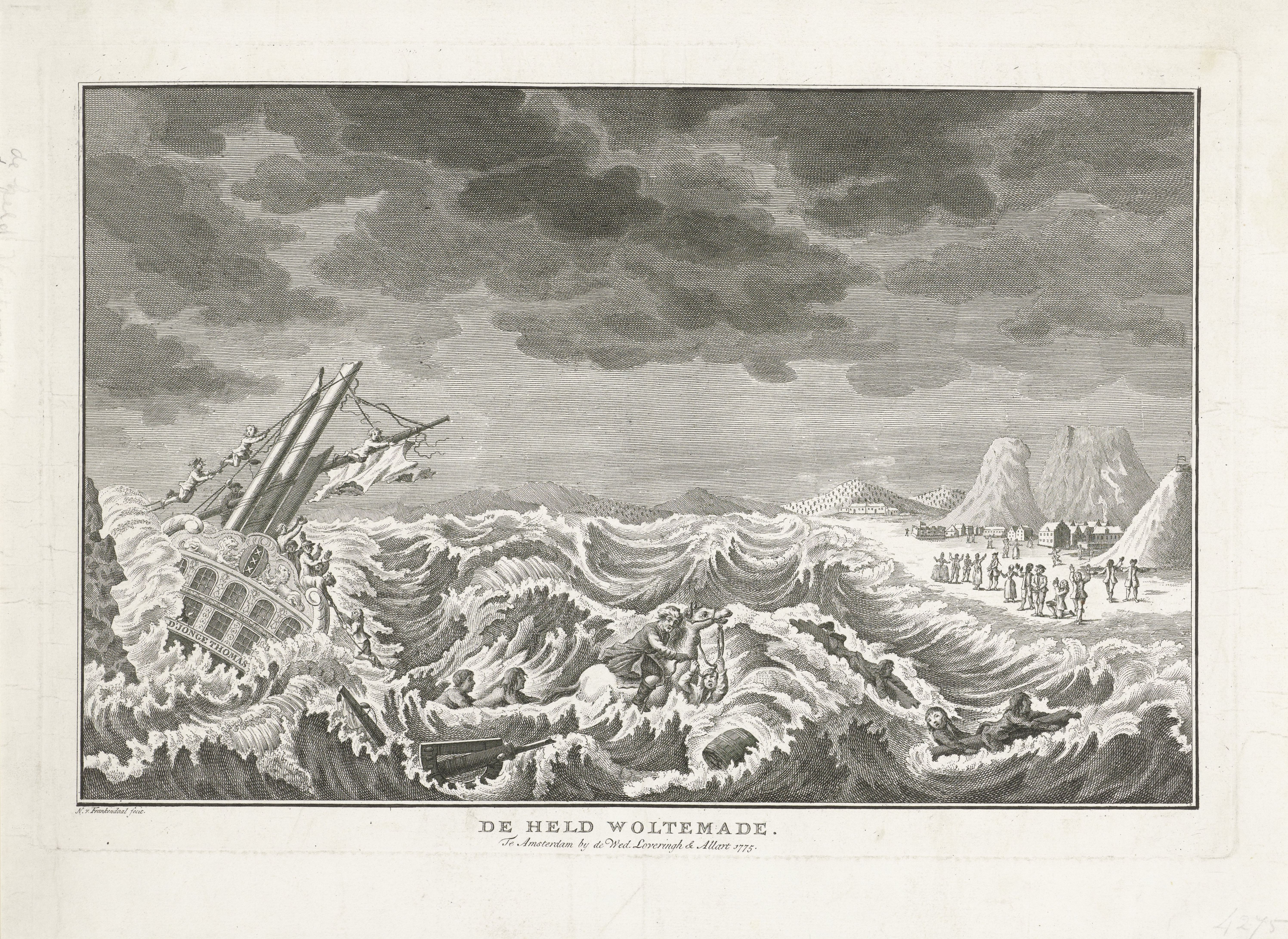
Heroic death of Woltemade at the Cape of Good Hope, 1773

== See also ==
- Afrikaans folklore
- Union of South Africa King's Medal for Bravery
- In A History of South Africa: From the Distant Past to the Present Day, edited by Fransjohan Pretorius, Pretoria: Protea Book House, 2014.
- Schirmer, P. 1980. The concise illustrated South African encyclopaedia. Central News Agency, Johannesburg, about 211pp
