= South African Police Service =

National police force of South Africa

South African Police Service Suid-Afrikaanse Polisiediens
- South African Police Service badge

- South African Police Service flag
- Abbreviation: SAPS

Agency overview
- Formed: 1995; 31 years ago
- Preceding agencies: South African Police; Homeland police agencies
- Employees: 187,681 (March 2025)
- Annual budget: R 113.6 billion (FY2024–25)

Jurisdictional structure
- National agency (Operations jurisdiction): South Africa
- Operations jurisdiction: South Africa
- Area: 1,219,090 km^{2} (470,690 sq mi)
- Population: 62,091,133 (2022 census)
- Legal jurisdiction: As per operations jurisdiction
- Governing body: Government of South Africa
- Constituting instruments: Constitution of the Republic of South Africa 1996, Chapter 11, Section 205; South African Police Service Act 68 of 1995
- General nature: Local civilian police

Operational structure
- Officers: 155,231 (March 2025)
- Civilians: 32,413 (March 2025)
- Minister responsible: Firoz Cachalia, Minister of Police
- Agency executive: General Sehlahle Fannie Masemola, National Police Commissioner
- Divisions: 6: Visible Policing; Cluster Coordination; Detective Service; Crime Intelligence; Criminal Record and Forensic Science Services; Protection and Security Services
- Provincials: 9: Eastern Cape; Free State; Gauteng; Kwazulu-Natal; Mpumalanga; Northern Cape; Limpopo; North West; Western Cape

Facilities
- Stations: 1,165 (March 2025)
- Motor vehicles: 43,699 (March 2025)
- Motorcycles: 904 (March 2025)
- Boats: 136 (March 2025)
- Helicopters: 26 (March 2025)
- Planes: 12 (March 2025)
- Dogs: 679 (January 2025)
- Horses: 181 (March 2025)

Website
- www.saps.gov.za

The South African Police Service (SAPS) is the national police force of the Republic of South Africa. Its 1,165 police stations in South Africa are divided according to the provincial borders, and a Provincial Commissioner is appointed in each province. The nine Provincial Commissioners report directly to the National Commissioner. The head office is in the Wachthuis Building in Pretoria.

The Constitution of South Africa lays down that the South African Police Service has a responsibility to prevent, combat and investigate crime, maintain public order, protect and secure the inhabitants of the Republic and their property, uphold and enforce the law, create a safe and secure environment for all people in South Africa, prevent anything that may threaten the safety or security of any community, investigate any crimes that threaten the safety or security of any community, ensure criminals are brought to justice and participate in efforts to address the causes of crime.

In 2013, Amnesty International expressed concern over South African police brutality, including torture and extrajudicial killings.

== History ==
=== Colonial years ===
The South African Police Service traces its origin to the Dutch Watch, a paramilitary organisation formed by settlers in the Cape Province in 1655 to protect civilians and to maintain law and order. In 1795, British officials assumed control over the Dutch Watch, and in 1825 established the Cape Constabulary (which became the Cape Town Police Force in 1840).

In 1854, a police force was established in Durban which would become the Durban Borough Police, and in 1935 the Durban City Police (DCP). Act 3 of 1855 established the Frontier Armed and Mounted Police Force in the Eastern Cape, restyled as the Cape Mounted Riflemen in 1878.

=== 1913-1994 ===
The South African Police (SAP) was created after the establishment of the Union of South Africa in 1910. Four years later, the Mounted Riflemen's Association relinquished its civilian responsibilities to the SAP as most of its riflemen left to serve in the First World War. The SAP and the military maintained a close relationship even after the SAP assumed permanent responsibility for domestic law and order in 1926. Police officials often called on the army for support in case of emergencies. During the Second World War, one SAP brigade served with the 2nd Infantry Division of the South African Army in North Africa.

When the National Party (NP) edged out its more liberal opponents in nationwide elections in 1948, the new government enacted legislation that strengthened the relationship between the police and the military. Police subsequently became heavily armed, especially when facing unruly or hostile crowds.

The Police Act (No. 7) of 1958 broadened the mission of the SAP beyond conventional police functions, and allowed police to quell civil unrest and conduct counterinsurgency operations. The Police Amendment Act (No. 70) of 1965 allowed police to detain any person, receptacle, vehicle, aircraft, or premises within one mile of any national border, and to seize anything found without a warrant. This search-and-seize zone was extended to within eight miles of any border in 1979 and to the entire country in 1983.

=== Post-apartheid (1994–present) ===
The new Minister of Safety and Security, Sydney Mufamadi, obtained police training assistance from Zimbabwe, the United Kingdom, and Canada and proclaimed that racial tolerance and human rights would be central to police training in the future. By the end of 1995, the SAPS had incorporated the ten police agencies of the former homelands, and had reorganised at both national and provincial level.

The Investigative Psychology Unit (IPU), also referred to as Investigative Psychology Section (IPS), was founded by forensic psychologist Micki Pistorius in 1996. Elmarie Myburgh was a founding member. It was then a division of the Serious and Violent Crimes Unit, later being moved to the Detective Service, and from June 2008 to the Criminal Record and Forensic Science Service (CRFSS). At that time, it comprised only three members at national head office level, led by Gerard Labuschagne.

== Organisation ==
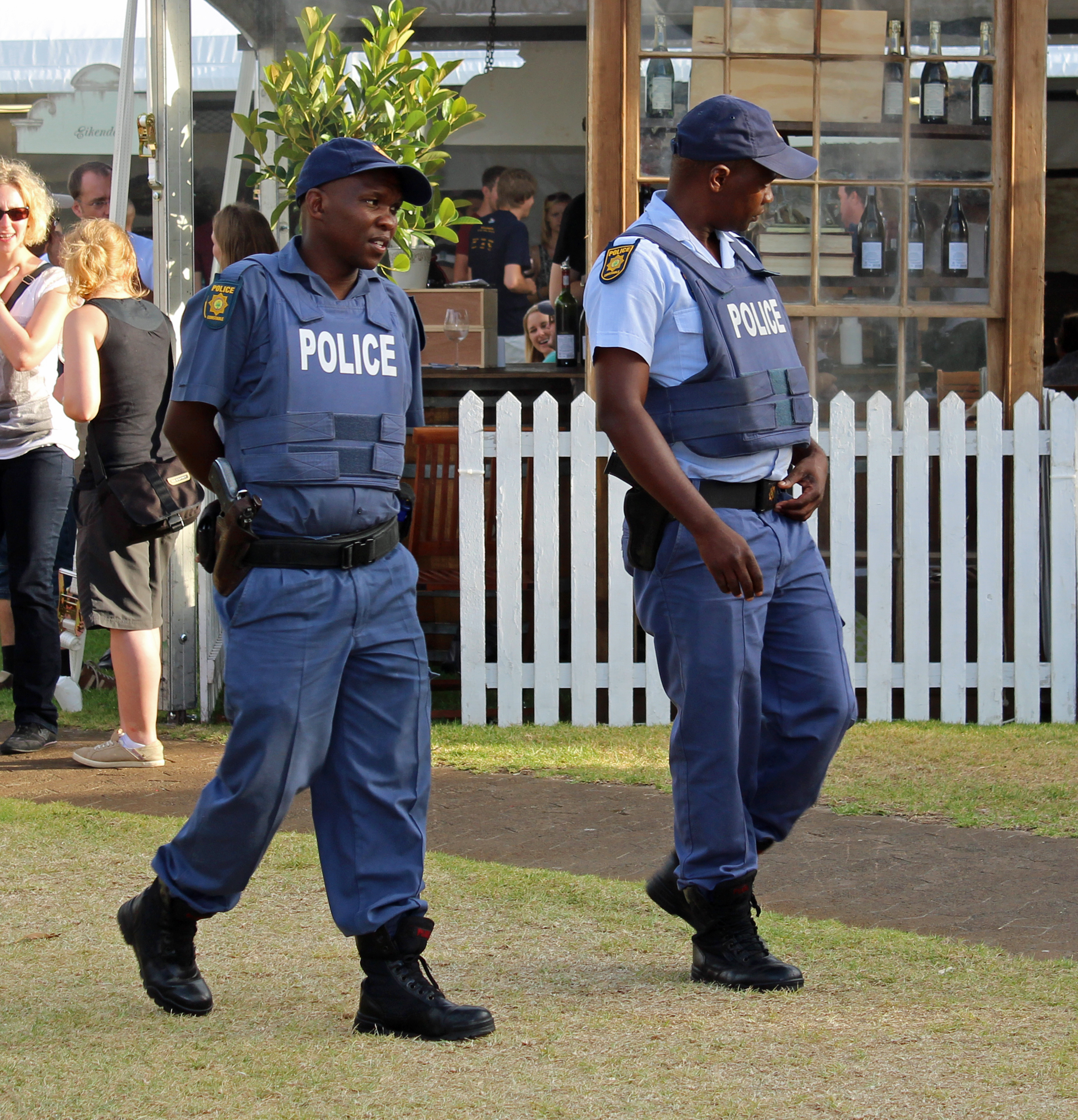
Patrol in Stellenbosch

South African Police Service headquarters in located in Pretoria.

=== Divisions ===
As of March 2023, there were three Deputy National Commissioners, with each of these split into divisions as follows:

- Policing:
  - Visible Policing and Operations
  - Protection and Security Services
- Crime Detection:
  - Detective and Forensic Services
  - Crime Intelligence
- Support Services
  - Human Resource Management
  - Human Resource Development
  - Legal and Policy Services
  - Technology Management Services

=== Rank structure ===
A new ranking system of the South African Police Service was adopted in April 2010. The change caused some controversy as new ranks like "general" and "colonel" have a military connotation. Furthermore, the new rank system mirrors the system used by the South African Police during the apartheid era. In 2009, Deputy Minister of Police Fikile Mbalula spoke of making the police a paramilitary force by changing the SAPS ranking system so that it would closely mirror the military ranking system. This created a significant amount of controversy from people critical of what they called the "militarisation" of the police.

The ranking system was amended in 2016. The role of regional police commissioner was introduced, with the rank of lieutenant general. The major and lieutenant ranks were eliminated, with lieutenants assuming the rank of captain and majors assuming the rank of lieutenant colonel.

==== Current senior staff ====
As of 2024 the National Commissioner is Lt. Gen. Sehlahle Fannie Masemola, who was appointed on 31 March 2022. Leon Mbangwa is Chief of Staff.

==== SAPS organisational profile ====
SAPS organisational profile
Rank	Number of officers/employees	
Rank	March 2023	March 2025
Ministerial personnel	30	34
National Commissioner (General)	1	1
Deputy National Commissioner (Lt. Gen.)	4	5
Div. Commissioners/National Head/Deputy Nat. Head (Lt. Gen.)	12	13
Provincial Commissioners (Lt. Gen.)	9	7
Major General	156	134
Brigadier	623	641
Colonel	2,417	2,504
Lieutenant Colonel	5,975	5,799
Captain	12,155	10,790
Non-commissioned officers	123,896	135,337
Public Service Act employees	34,226	32,413
Total employees	179,502	187,681

Police ranks of South Africa: Commissioned Officers
Group	Senior Management			
Rank	General (Gen)	Lieutenant General (Lt Gen)	Major General (Maj Gen)	Brigadier
Role	Designation of National Commissioner	Actg. National Commissioner, Deputy National Commissioner, Regional Commissioner, Provincial Commissioner, Divisional Commissioner		
Insignia				

Police ranks of South Africa: Commissioned Officers
Group	Junior Management		
Rank	Colonel (Col)	Lieutenant Colonel (Lt Col)	Captain
Insignia			

Police ranks of South Africa : Non-commissioned Officers
Group	Other Ranks		
Rank	Warrant Officer (WO)	Sergeant (Sgt)	Constable (Const)
Insignia			

== Resources ==
=== Vehicles ===
Through the early-1990s, the police were equipped with smoke and tear-gas dispensing vehicles, tank trucks with water cannons, vehicles that dispensed barbed wire or razor wire to cordon off areas, and a number of rotor and fixed wing aircraft for surveillance, ground force management, rapid deployment of Task Force and specialist teams to crime scenes and VIP personnel movements.

The RG-12 'Nyala' is one of the most commonly used armored vehicles of the service. The Casspir Mine-Resistant Ambush Protected Vehicle is another notable vehicle used by SAPS.

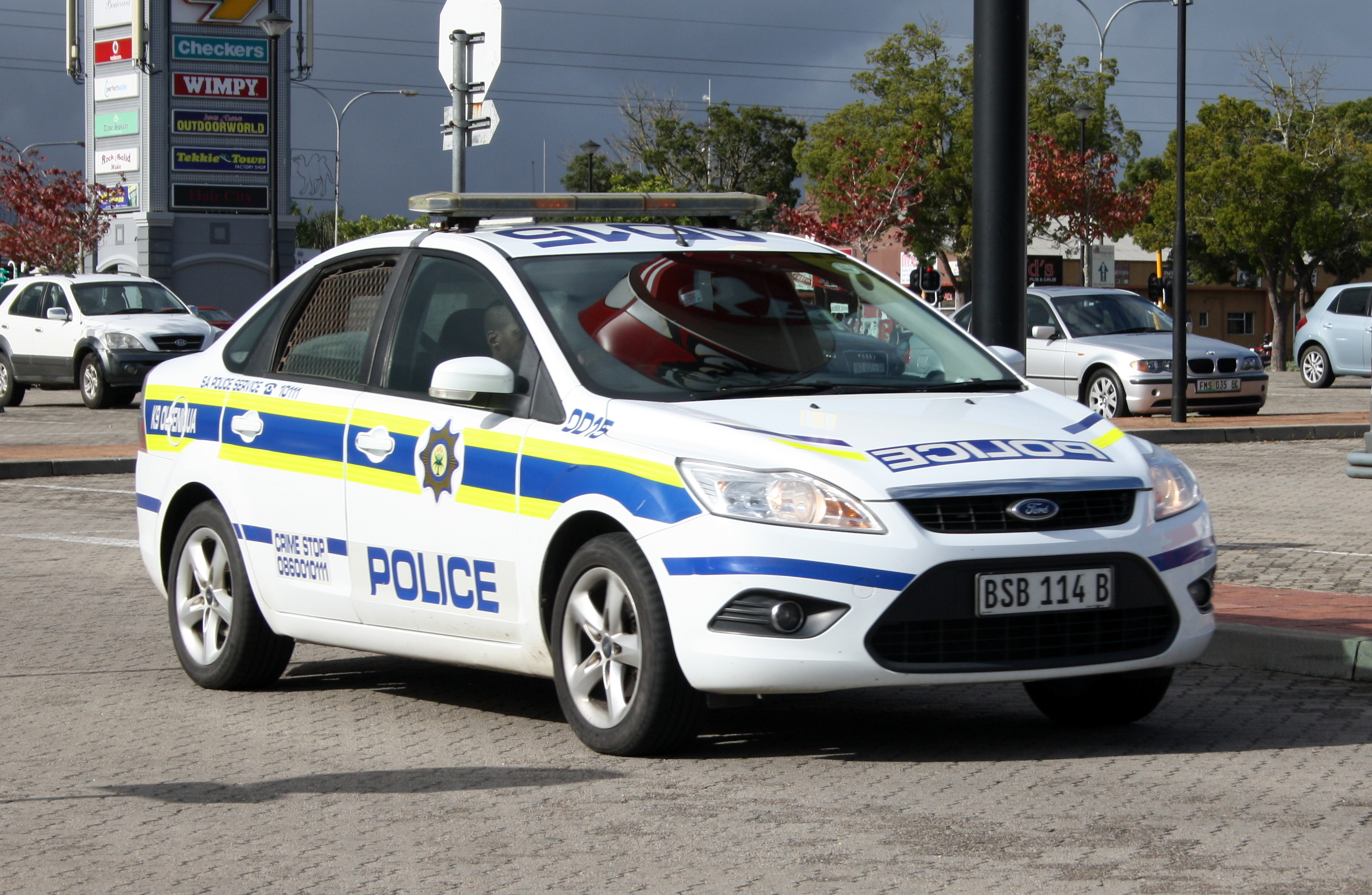
Ford Focus

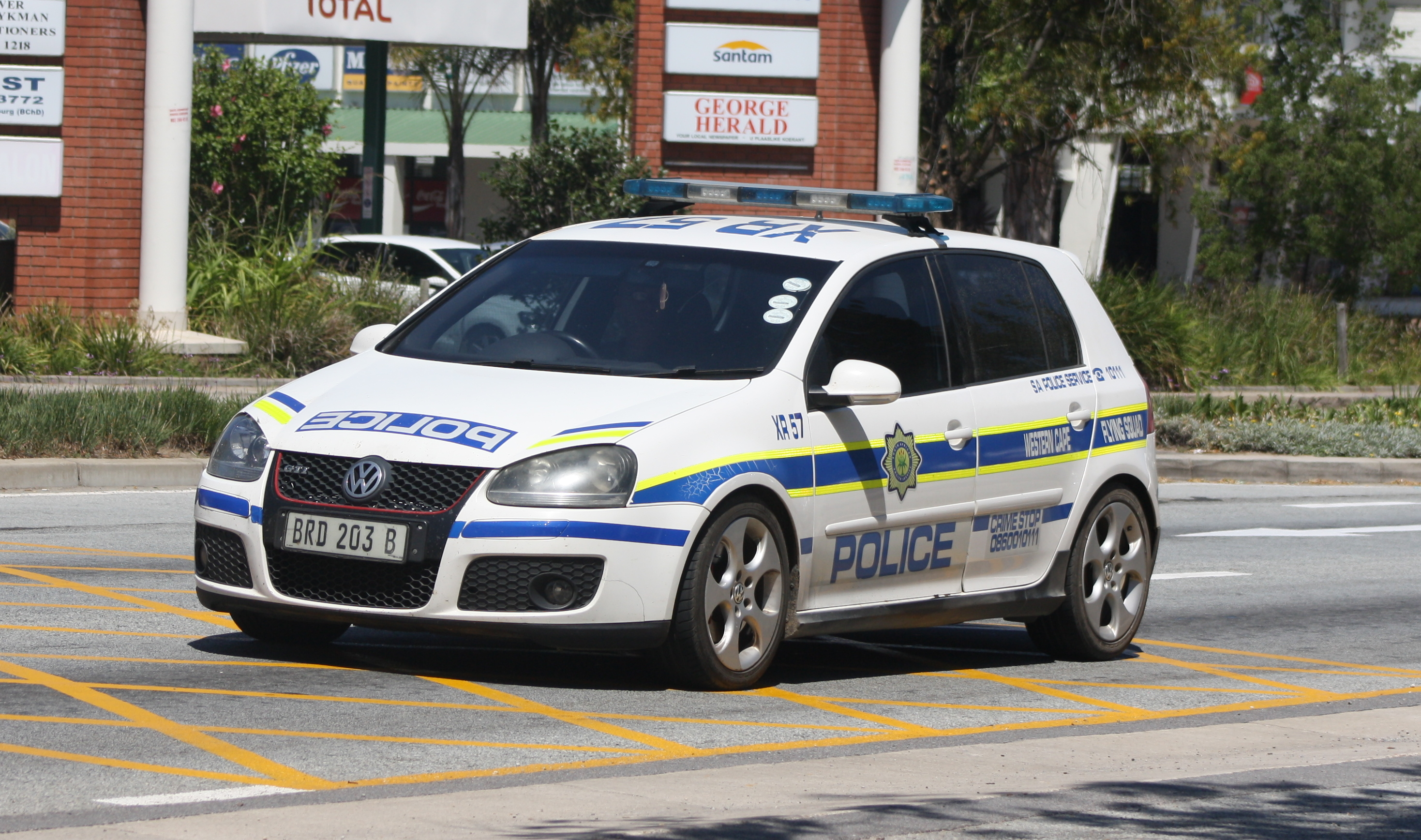
Volkswagen Golf GTI

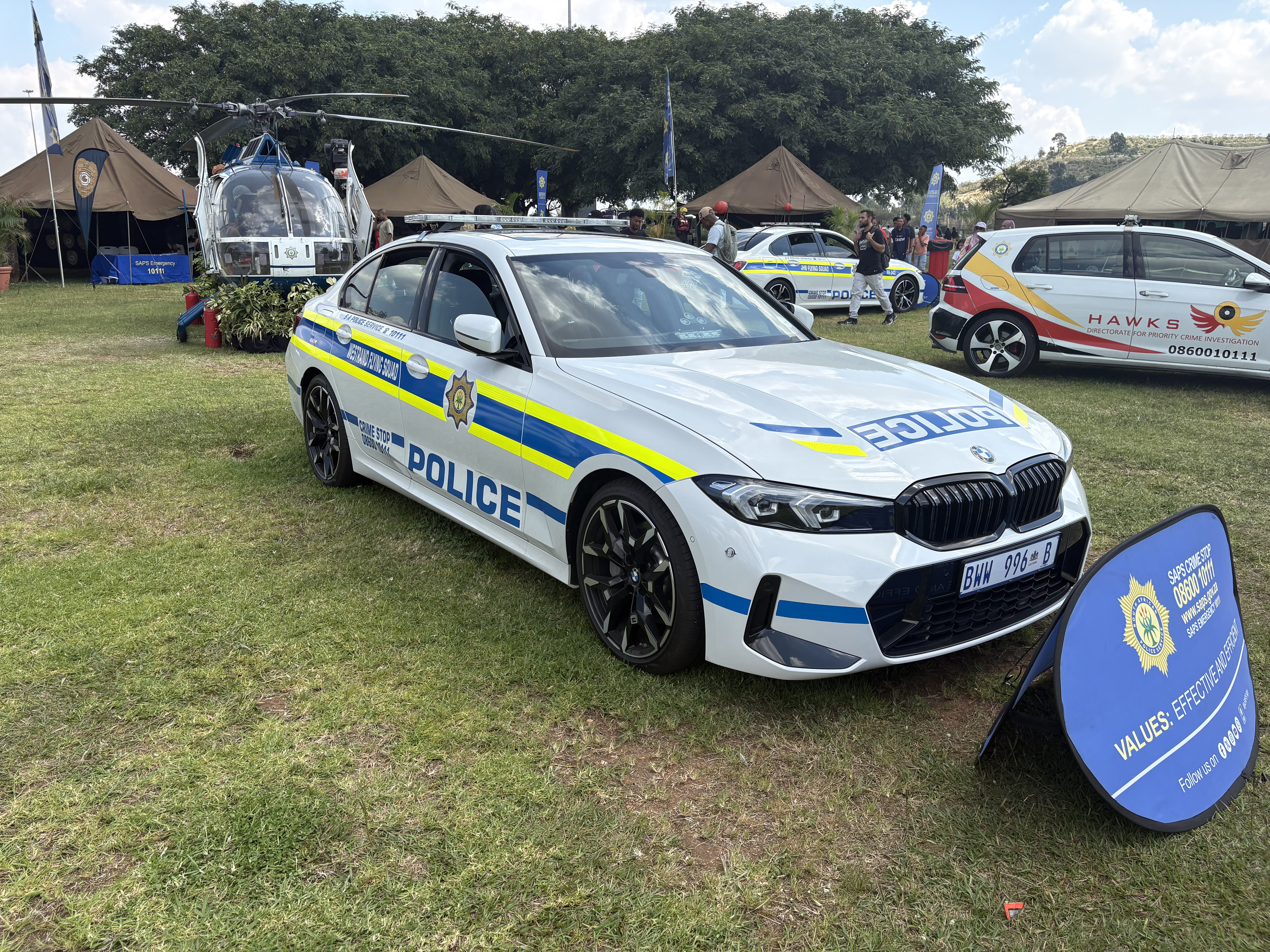
BMW 3 Series Highway Patrol

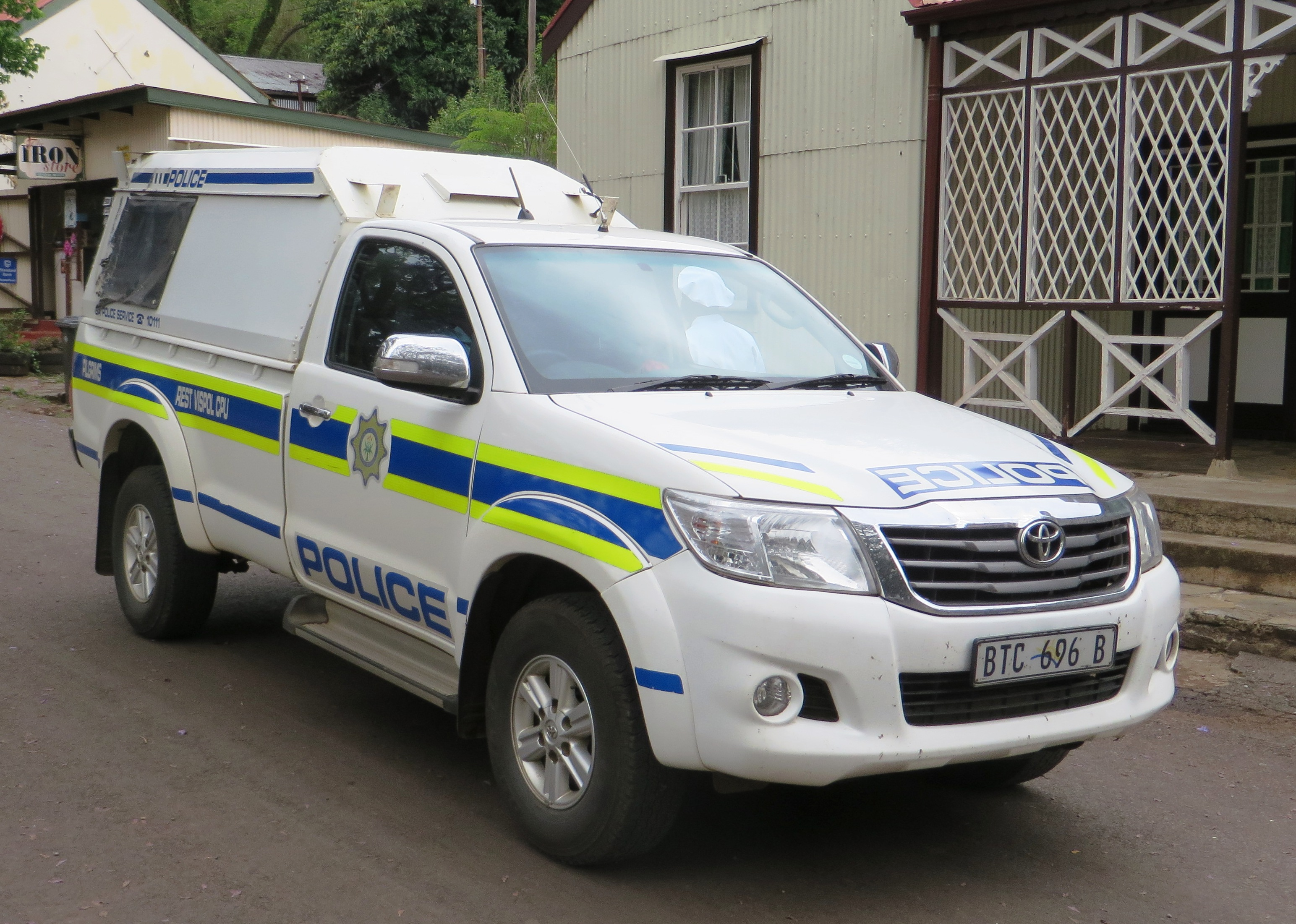
Toyota Hilux

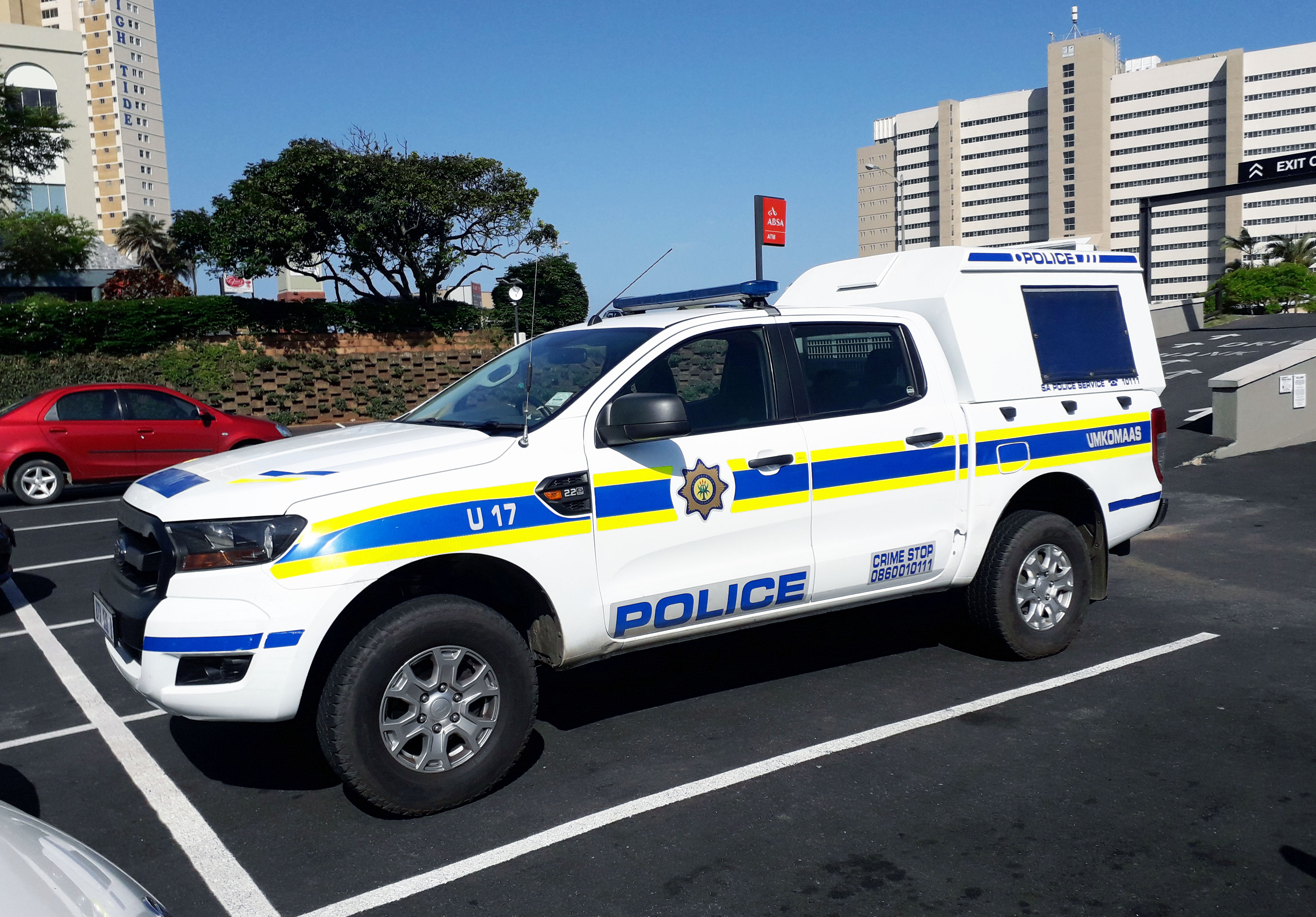
Ford Ranger

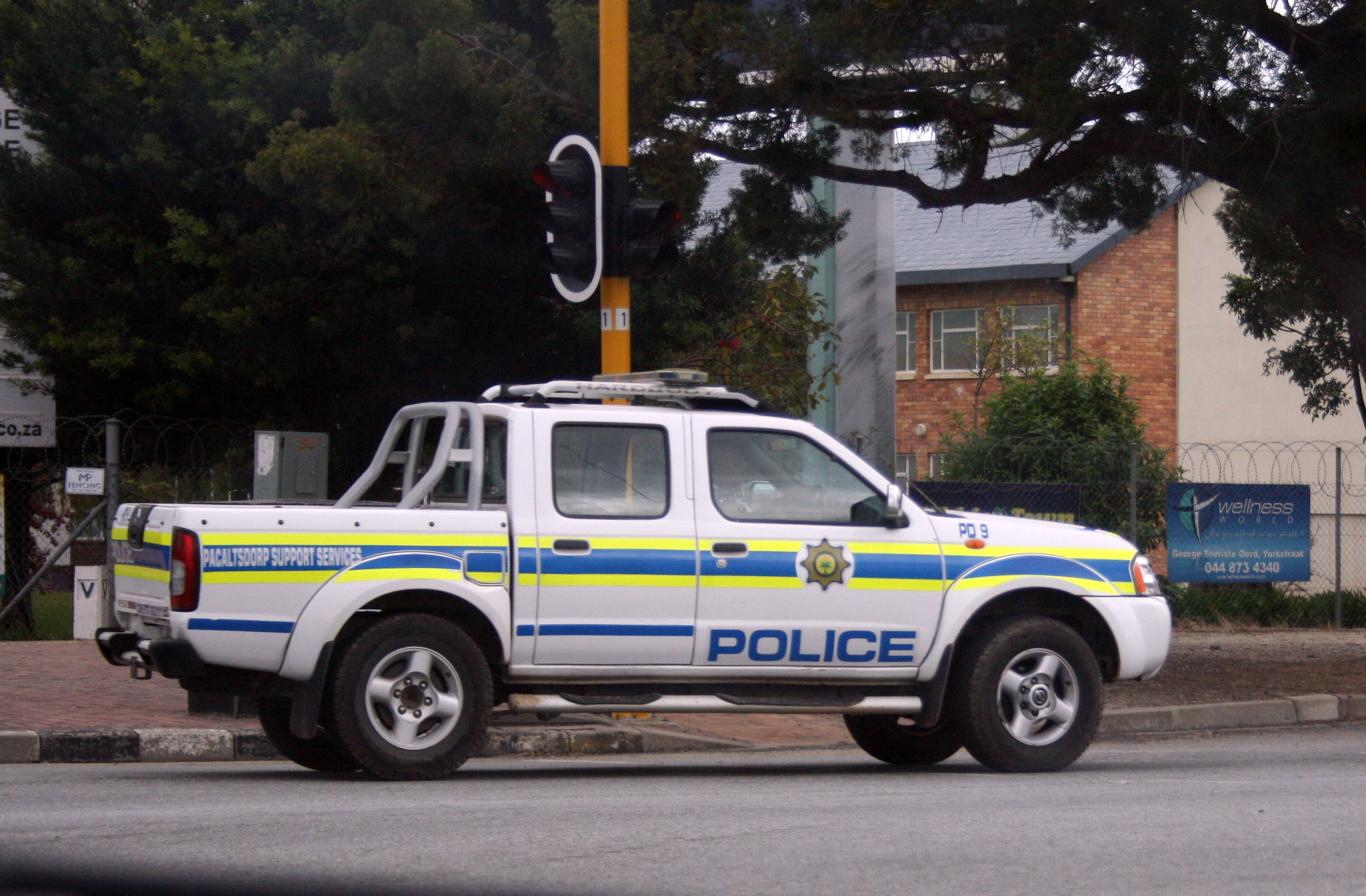
Nissan NP300

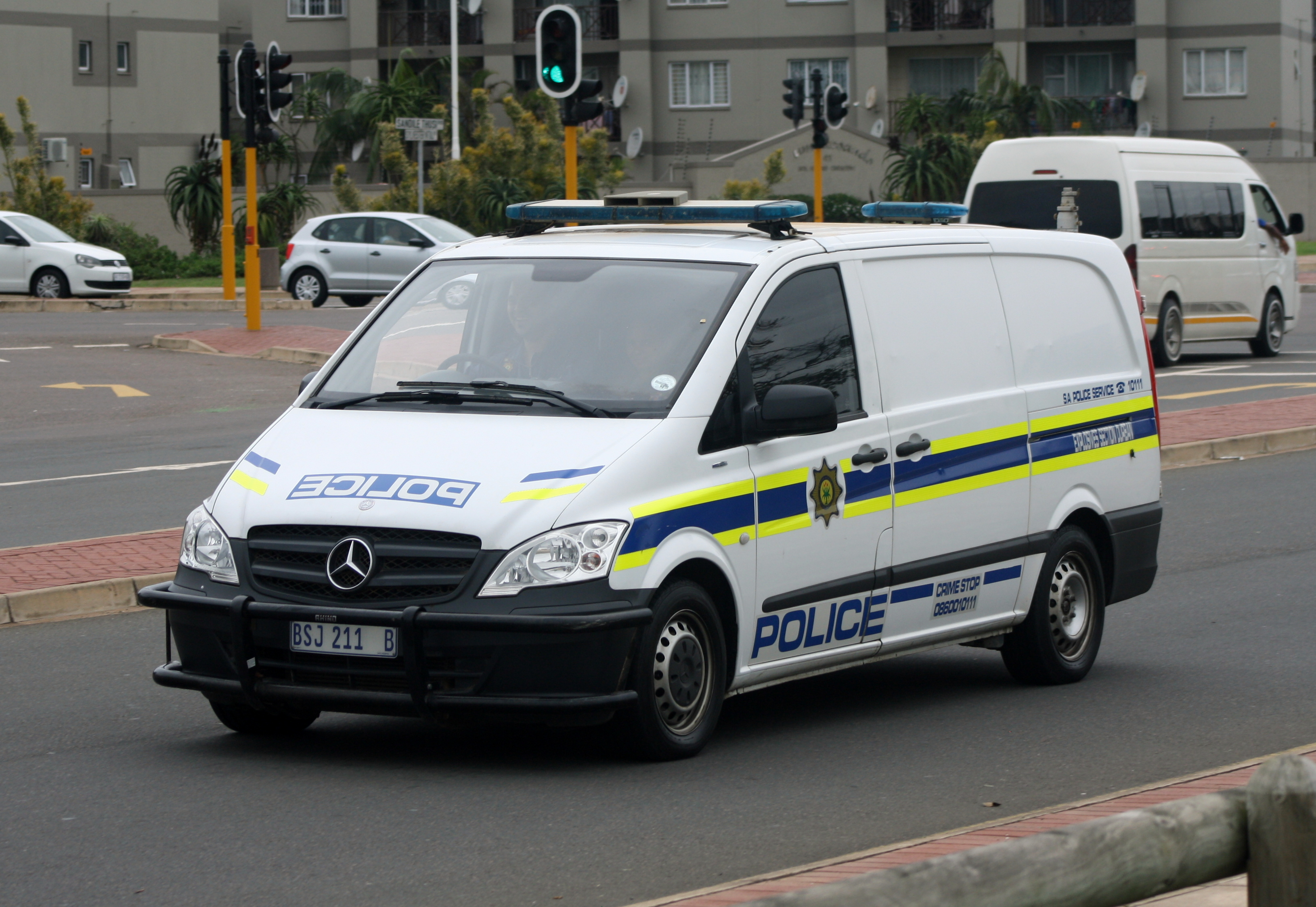
Mercedes-Benz Vito Explosives Section

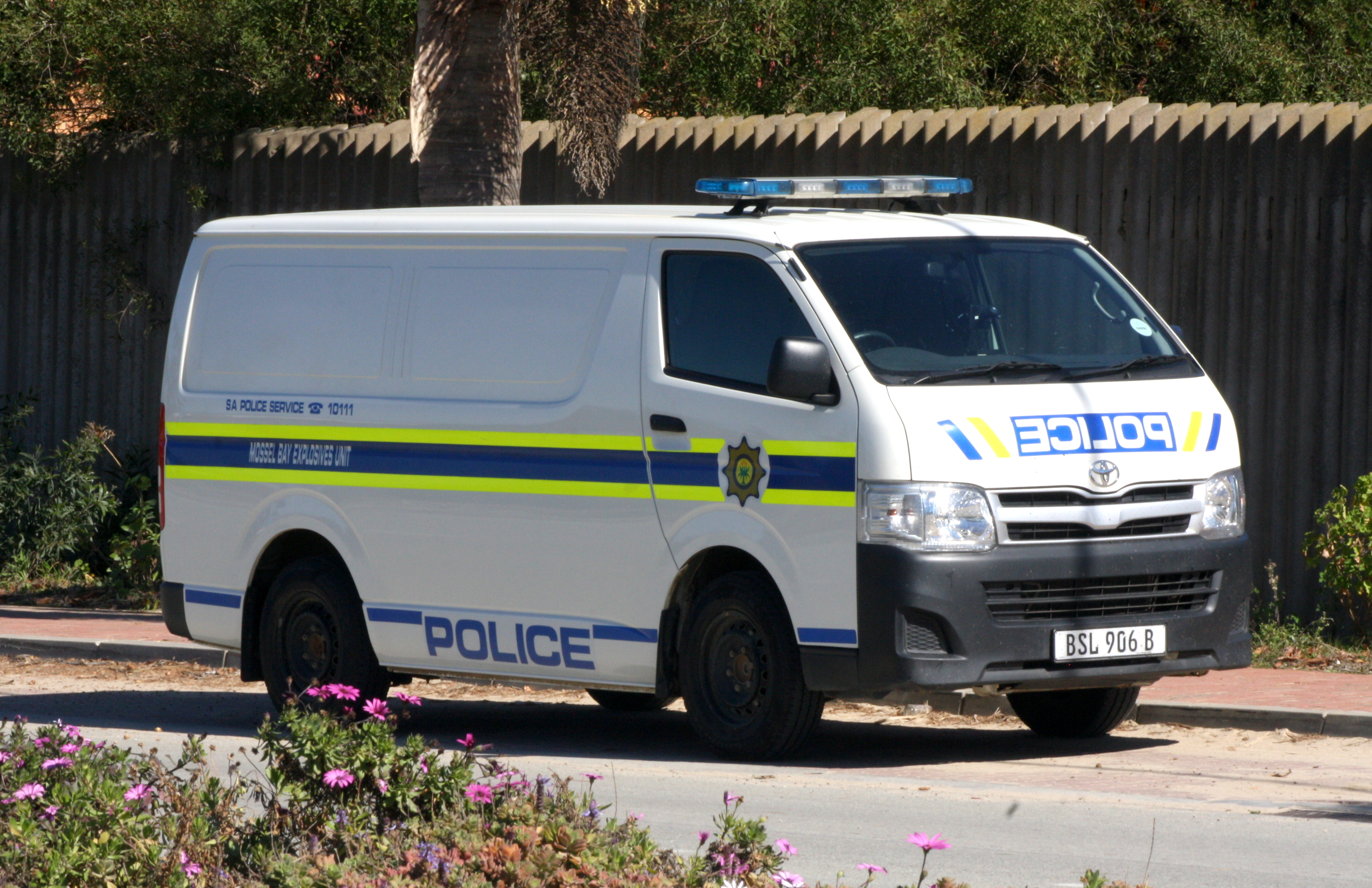
Toyota Quantum Explosives Section

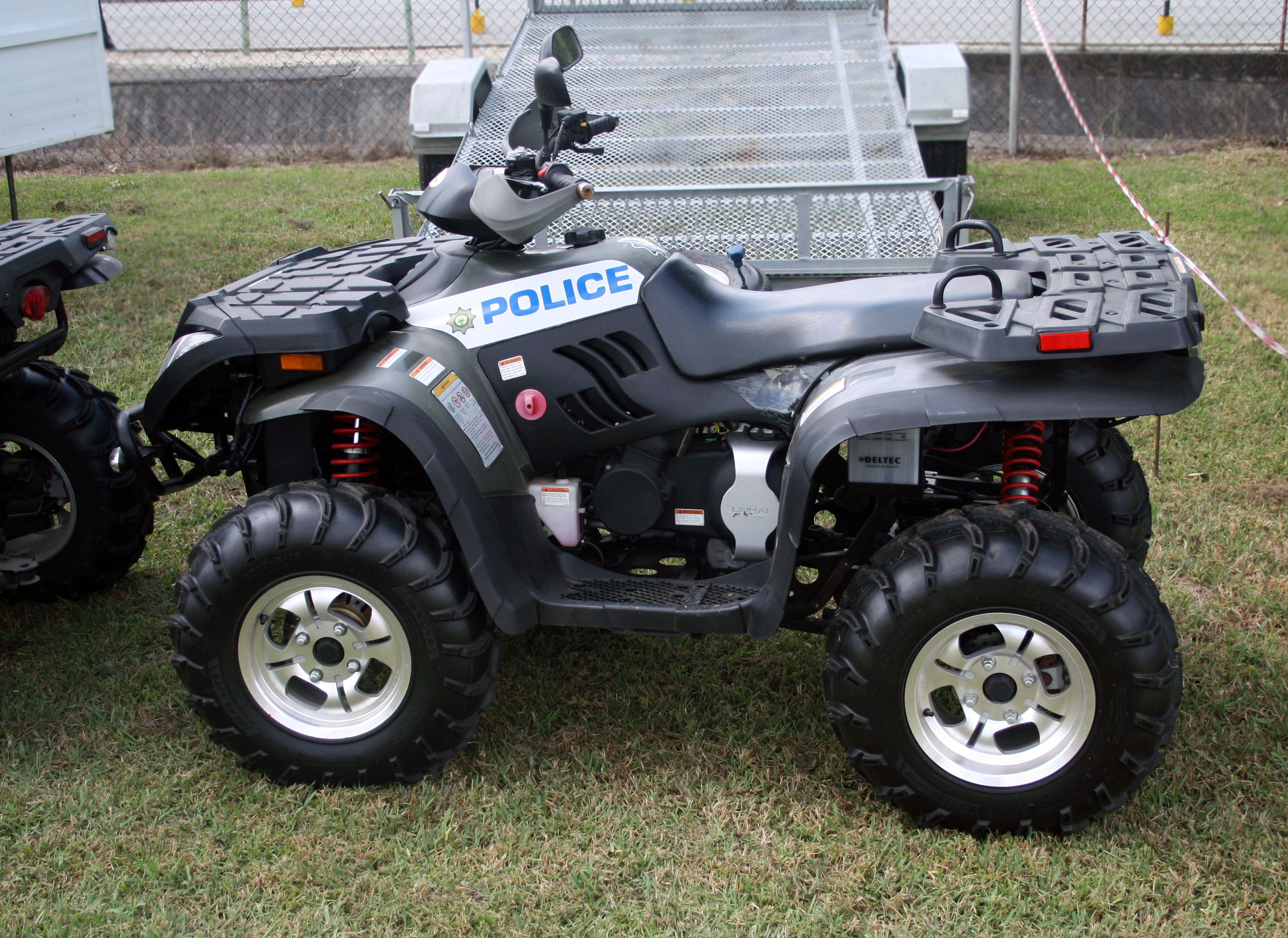
Linhai ATV

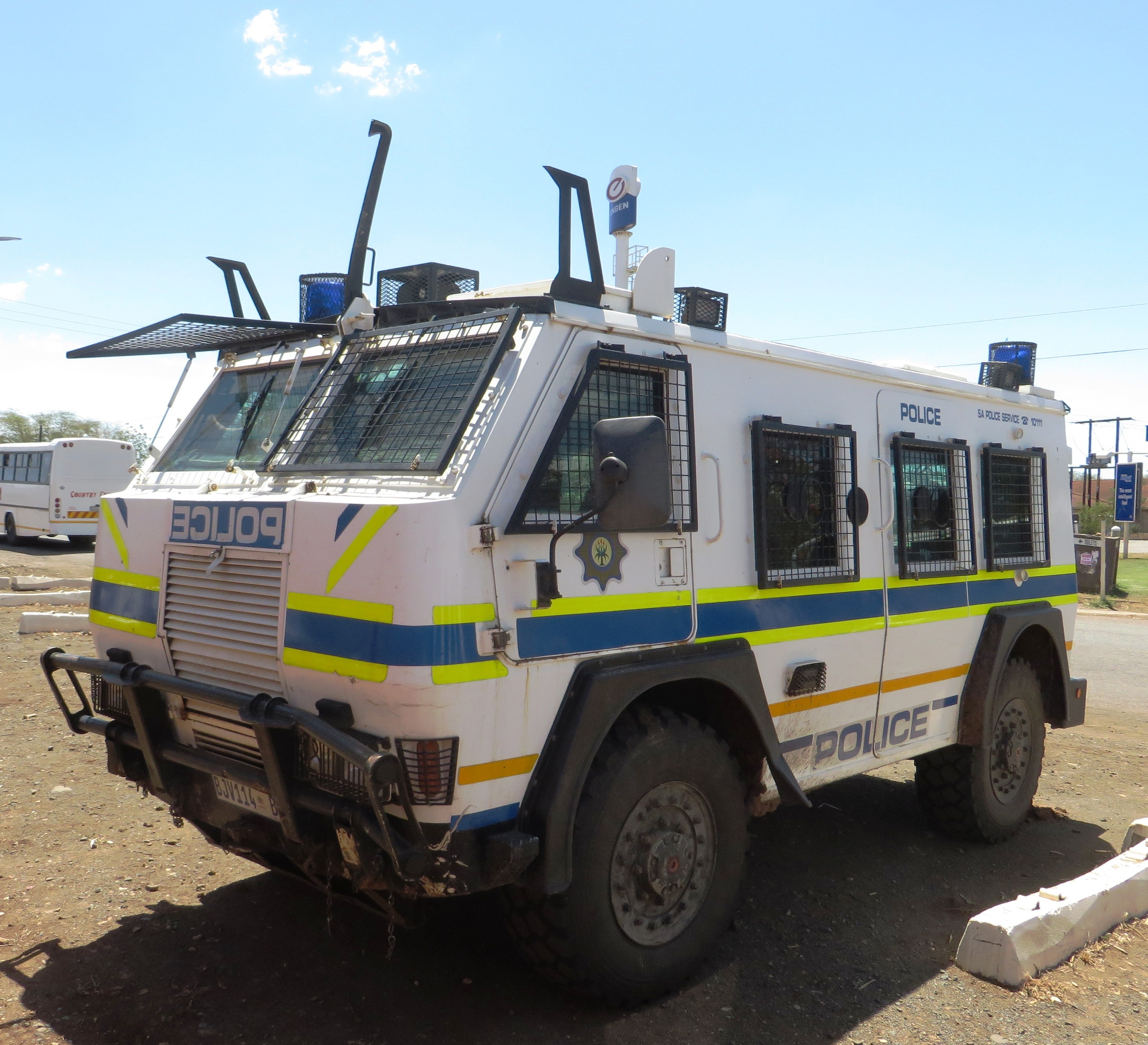
RG-12

=== Aviation ===
As of March 2025, the SAPS Air Wing operates a fleet of 38 aeroplanes and helicopters. The Air Wing has about 50 pilots and 300 other personnel.

==== Fleet ====
The SAPS Air Wing fleet consists of:

Airplanes

- 8 x Pilatus PC-6/B2-H4
- 1 x Beech King Air C90A
- 1 x Cessna 680 Citation Sovereign
- 1 x Pilatus PC-12/47

Helicopters

- 16 x Eurocopter AS350 B3
- 6 x Robinson R44
- 2 x McDonnell-Douglas 369E
- 1 x MBB Bk 117B1
- 2 × Airbus H125

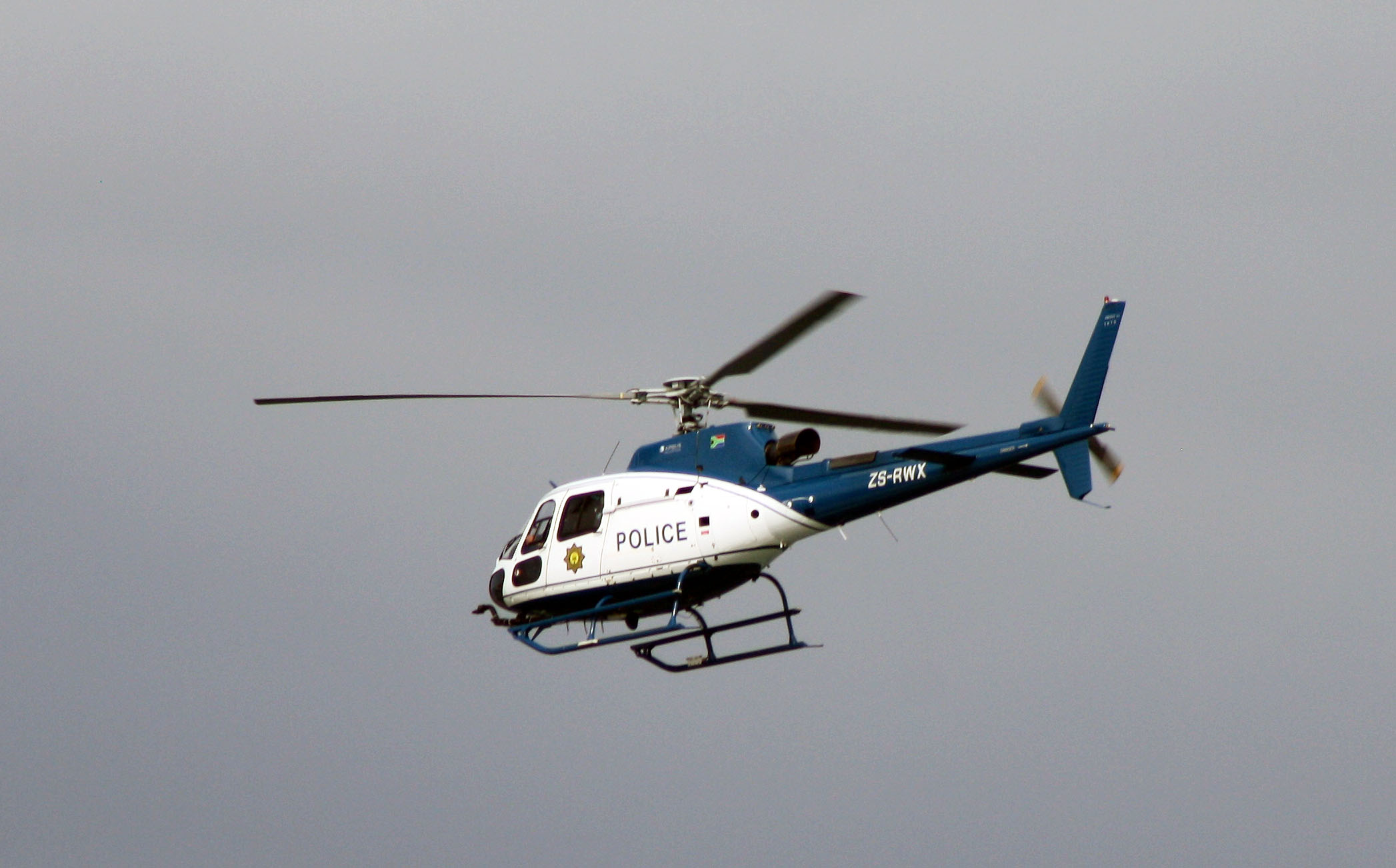
Eurocopter AS350

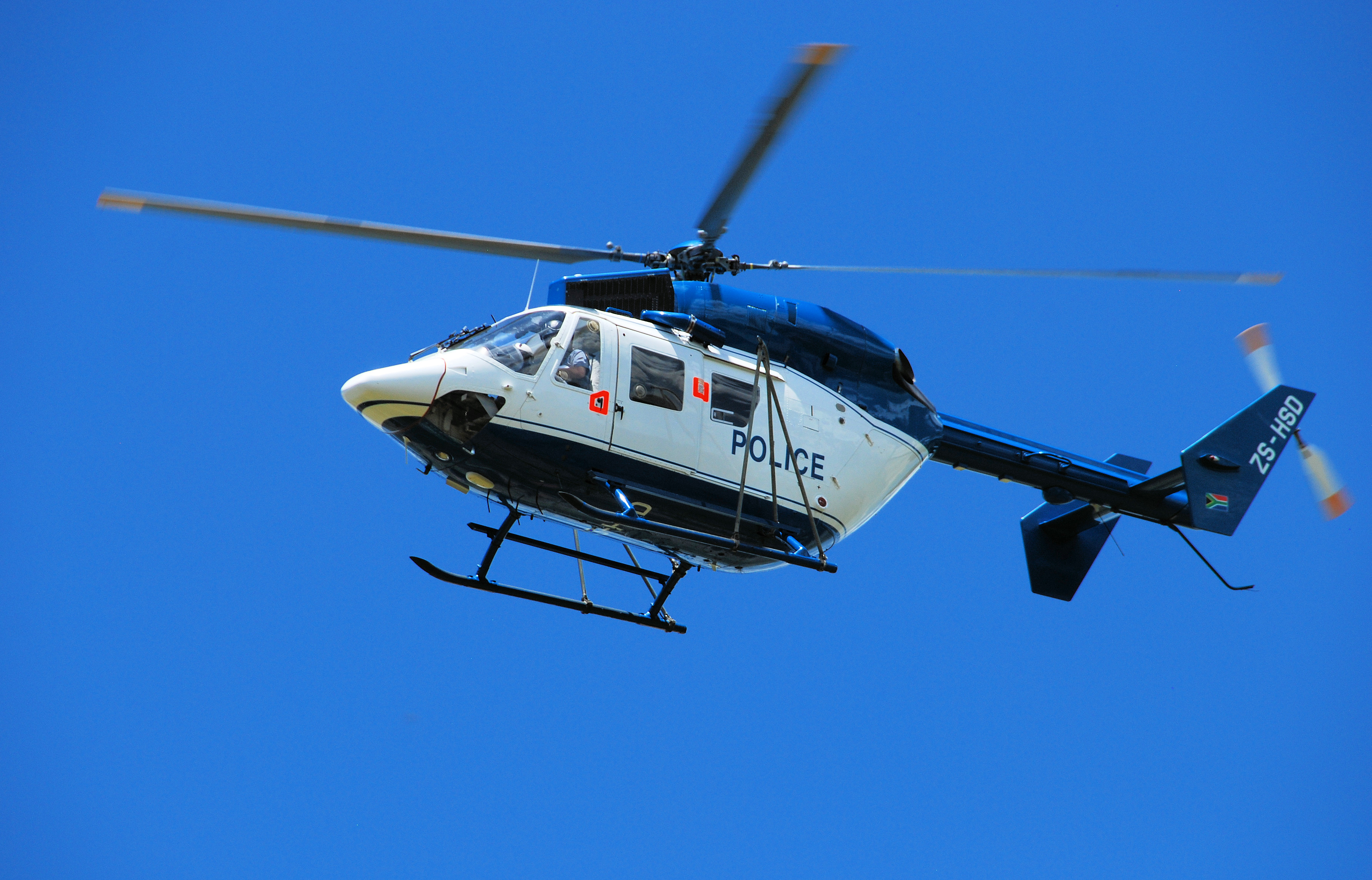
MBB/Kawasaki BK 117

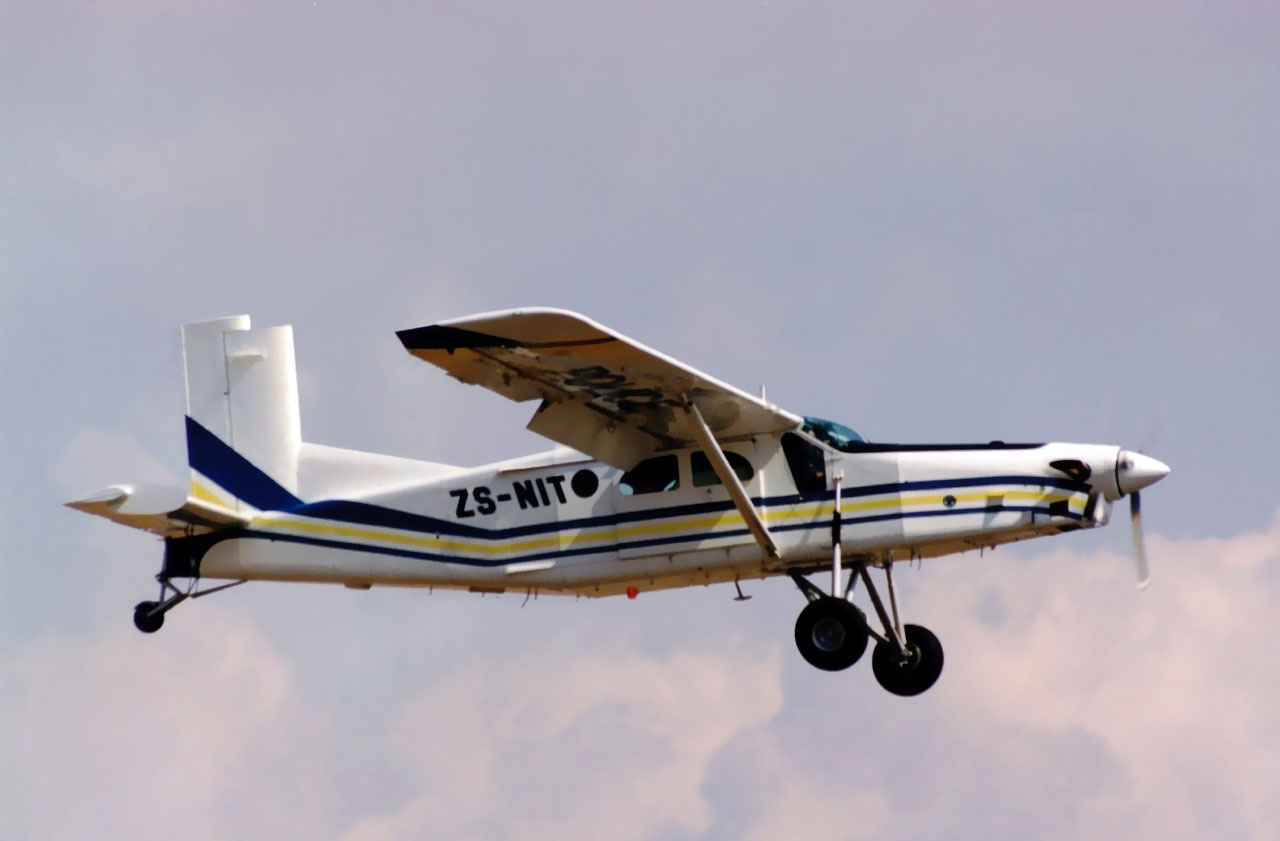
Pilatus PC-6/B2-H4

=== Firearms ===
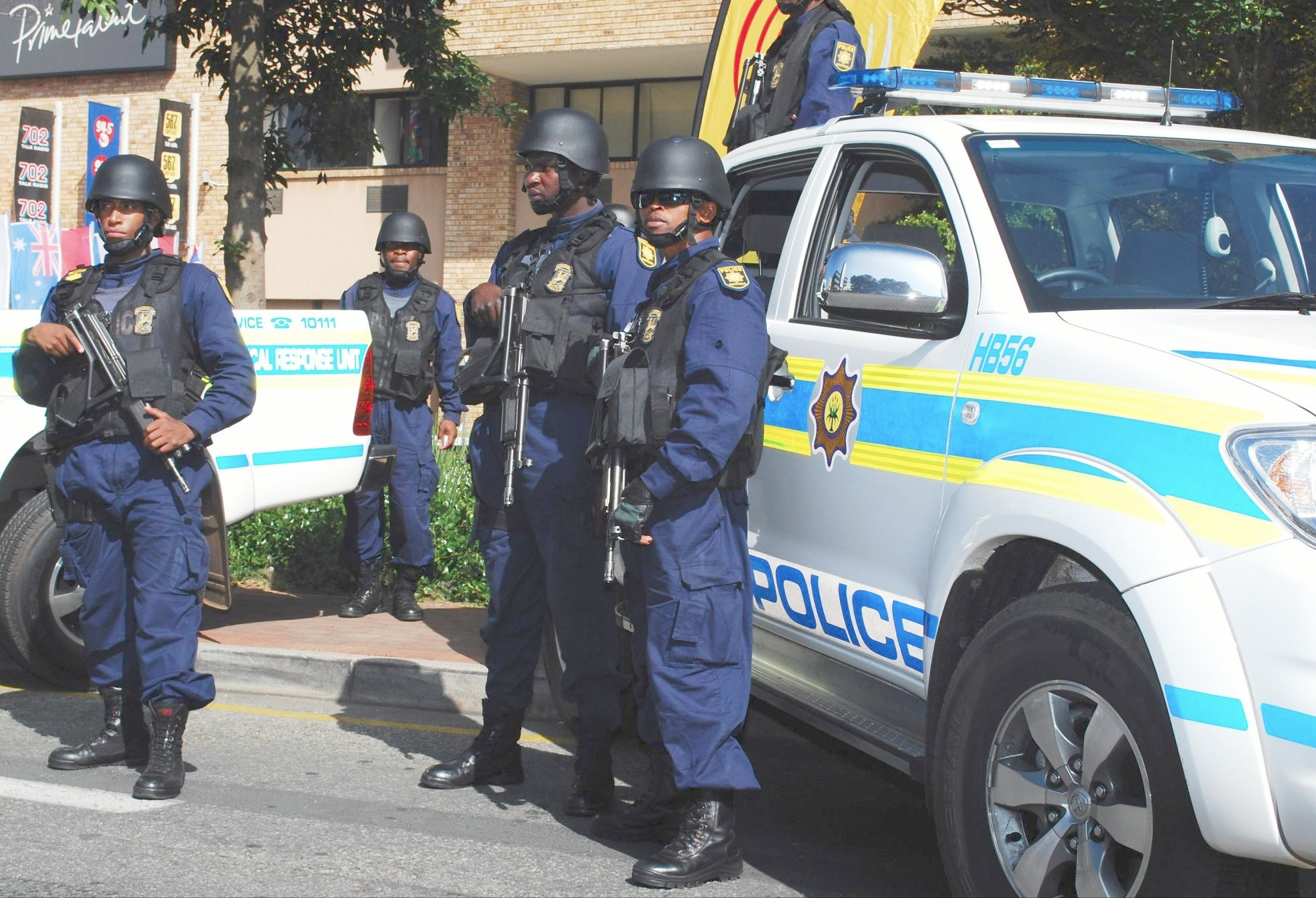
Officers with Vektor R5 rifles in Johannesburg, 2010

South African Police Service officers generally carry a Vektor Z88 9mm pistol and pepper spray. Each patrol car is usually also equipped a R5 rifle. To quell disturbances a variety of firearms are used, including BXP sub-machine gun, Musler 12 gauge shotgun (capable of firing anti-riot rubber bullets contained in standard 12 bore shotgun cartridges), as well as tear gas and pencil flares.

The R1 rifle has been withdrawn from all front-line police armories since the mid-1990s, but is still used by elements of the Special Task Force.

== Criticism and controversies ==
Public trust in the South African Police Service between 1998 and 2024. View chart definition.

=== Administration ===
Since the departure of democratic South Africa's first National commissioner George Fivaz in January 2000, a number of successive commissioners have been unable to complete a single term in office, most implicated in and charged with misconduct.

The distribution of personnel has been controversial, with local legislators questioning why areas most in need of policing resources are being neglected.

The department was criticised by the Western Cape Government for providing the lowest number personnel (adjusted for population) with a shortage of 2,392 officers, despite having the highest murder rate. This was the subject of the Khayelitsha Commission in 2012.

=== Brutality and repression ===
Amnesty International has expressed concerns about police brutality, including torture and extrajudicial killings, in South Africa. There has also been concern about brutal training methods for the police. According to Peter Jordi from the Wits Law Clinic "[Police] Torture is spiralling out of control. It is happening everywhere." Brandon Edmonds argues that "The cops prey on the poor in this country." Independent studies have confirmed that the SAPS has been used to repress peaceful marches.

In April 2009, SAPS attempted to ban unFreedom Day and was implicated in support for September 2009 ANC mob that attacked the elected leadership of the shack settlement at Kennedy Road, Durban. Police officers have also been accused of excessive policing in Blikkiesdorp in Delft, Cape Town, by suppression of freedom and ordering illegal curfews.

In 2011, 630 police officers from Gauteng Province were arrested for fraud and corruption, rape and murder. An April 2012 editorial in The Times opined: "It seems torture and outright violation of human rights is becoming the order of the day for some of our police officers and experts warn that the line between criminals and our law enforcement officers is "blurred"."

In February 2013, police in Daveyton, Gauteng were caught on video brutalising Mido Macia, a Mozambican taxi driver accused of parking illegally. Macia was handcuffed to a police van and dragged through the streets, later succumbing to his injuries. Eight police officers were arrested and later convicted of murder.

Three police officers were arrested for the controversial shooting of Nathaniel Julies, a 16 year-old boy with down syndrome, in Eldorado Park.

==== Marikana massacre ====
The Marikana Massacre, was a mass shooting that occurred when police broke up a gathering by striking Lonmin workers on a 'koppie' (hilltop) near the Nkaneng shack settlement in Marikana on 16 August 2012. 34 miners were killed and 78 miners injured, causing anger and public outcry, fueled by reports that most of the victims were shot from behind and many shot far from police lines.

It later emerged that the violence had actually started on 11 August when leaders from the National Union of Mineworkers opened fire on striking NUM members killing two. It is alleged that police did nothing in the aftermath thereby creating a situation in which workers felt that they would have to use other means to protect themselves.

Between 12 and 14 August, approximately 8 more people were killed including two policemen and two security guards. It is the country's deadliest incident between police and the civilian population since the Sharpeville Massacre of 1960, and has been referred to as a turning-point in post-1994 South Africa.

== Corruption ==
On 10 September 2007 an arrest warrant was issued by the National Prosecuting Authority (NPA) for National Police Commissioner Jackie Selebi (Interpol president from 2004 to 2008). On 23 September 2007, President Mbeki suspended NPA Head Vusi Pikoli, allegedly because of "an irretrievable breakdown" in the relationship between Pikoli and Justice Minister Brigitte Mabandla.

However, journalists at the Mail and Guardian, a major South African news publication, claim to have solid information supporting the widespread suspicion that President Mbeki suspended Pikoli as part of a bid to shield Police Commissioner Selebi. According to the Mail and Guardian on 5 October 2007 the NPA was investigating Selebi for corruption, fraud, racketeering and defeating the ends of justice. Selebi was found guilty of corruption in July 2010, but not guilty of further charges of perverting the course of justice.

In February 2011 Bheki Cele was implicated in unlawful conduct and maladministration with a R500m lease agreement for the new police headquarters in Pretoria. In October 2011, President Jacob Zuma announced that Cele had been suspended pending an investigation into the agreement. After recommendation from a board of inquiry, Zuma dismissed Cele and announced that Riah Phiyega, the first female commissioner, would replace him.

In February 2018, SAPS Lieutenant-General Khomotso Phahlane, who was also former acting SAPS Commissioner, and his wife appeared in court on charges of fraud and corruption. On 30 July 2020, Phahlane was dismissed from the police after three years on suspension. The same day, he was found guilty of dishonest conduct.

On 12 July 2019, it was announced the five North West Province police officers were arrested during the week in three separate corruption cases. On 4 June 2020, six senior Gauteng police officers where among 14 people arrested on corruption charges. Two other senior officers, now retired, were arrested as well. Among the Guateng-based SAPS officers charged with corruption included three brigadiers and a retired SAPS Lieutenant General,

On 12 October 2020, Lieutenant-General Bonang Mgwenya, the country's second-most senior police official, was arrested on charges of corruption, fraud, theft and money laundering involving about R200-million and afterwards appeared in Ridge Magistrates court. At the time of Mgwenya's arrest, she and Phahlane were among 14 fellow officers who were charged with corruption. Mgwenya was suspended on 15 October 2020 and was dismissed from SAPS on 13 November 2020.

On 23 December 2020, four Cape Town police officers attached to the national border control unit at Cape Town International Airport were arrested for extorting money from Chinese businesses.

On 23 December 2020, Peter Ntsime, Acting Deputy General Secretary of the South African Policing Union (SAPU), reported that Colonel Kamelash Dalip Singh, a senior SAPU policeman from the KwaZulu-Natal Provincial Anti-Corruption Unit, was arrested, and then released on bail, on a bribe charge. Ntsime criticised the arrest, stating Singh was at the forefront of arresting crooked police officers and was onto a big syndicate. Directorate for Priority Crime Investigation (Hawks) spokesperson, Captain Simphiwe Mhlongo, said that undercover Hawks officers caught Singh red-handed accepting a R5,000 bribe.

On 28 December 2020, three law enforcement officers who were employed by the Emalahleni Municipality were arrested in Mpumalanga on corruption and bribery charges which involved allegations of not issuing standard fines to motorists who committed traffic violations, but instead extorting them for bribes.

In 2022, two criminal charges were lodged by the Independent Police Investigative Directorate against the National Police Commissioner Khehla Sitole for refusing to cooperate with its investigation into the murder of Charl Kinnear. Kinnear was a police intelligence officer investigating organised crime within the SAPS.

On 6 July 2025, KwaZulu Natal Provincial Police Commissioner, Nhlanhla Mkhwanazi became a whistleblower against high-ranking police officials and politicians, including Police Minister, Senzo Mchunu, and members of the judiciary. He accused them of aiding criminal syndicates, involving themselves in investigations and obstructing justice.

On 13 July 2025, South African president Cyril Ramaphosa placed Senzo Mchunu on special leave. Deputy national commissioner is challenging the "unlawful" suspension against him.

== List of former National Commissioners ==
National Commissioners
From	Commissioners of the South African Police	To	Ribbon
1913	Col Sir Theodorus Gustaff Truter CMG,KBE,KPM	1928	Order of St Michael and St George CMG Order of the British Empire KBE King's Police Medal KPM
1928	Maj Isaac Pierre de Villiers CB,MC,KStJ	1940	Order of the Bath CB Military Cross MC Venerable Order of Saint John KStJ
1940	Brig George Robson Carruthers Baston KPM (Note: Brig George CR Baston was acting Commissioner of the South African Police Force (1940 - 1945) whilst Maj Gen IP de Villiers served in the Union Defence Force)	1945	King's Police Medal KPM
1 August 1945	Maj Robert John Palmer CVO,KPM,DSO & 2 Bars (Note: General Palmer was awarded the DSO and two bars, that is three awards of the DSO as well as the American Bronze Star.)	1951	Royal Victorian Order CVO King's Police Medal KPM Distinguished Service Order and two Bars DSO & 2 Bars
1951	Maj Jan-Kamas Brink	1954	
1954	Maj Corrie I. Rademeyer	1960	
1960	Lieutenant General Hendrik Jacobus du Plooy MVO	1962	Royal Victorian Order MVO
1962	Lieutenant General Johannes Martinus Keevy	1968	
1968	General Johannes Petrus Gous	1971	
1971	General G. J. Joubert SOO	1973	South African Police Star for Distinguished Service SOO
1973	General Theodorus J. Crous	1975	
1975	General Gert L. Prinsloo	1978	
1978	General Michiel Christian Wilhelm Geldenhuys SED,SOO,SOE,SD	1983	South African Police Star for Distinguished Leadership SED South African Police Star for Distinguished Service SOO South African Police Star for Outstanding Service SOE Southern Cross Decoration SD
1 June 1983	General Petrus Johann Coetzee SSA,SED,SOO,SOE,SD	1987	Star of South Africa SSA South African Police Star for Distinguished Leadership SED South African Police Star for Distinguished Service SOO South African Police Star for Outstanding Service SOE Southern Cross Decoration SD
1987	General Hennie G. de Witt	1989	
1990	General Johan Velde van der Merwe SSAS,SOE	1996	Star of South Africa SSAS South African Police Star for Outstanding Service SOE
From	Commissioners of the South African Police Service	To	Ribbon
29 January 1995	General John George Fivaz SSAG,SOE	31 December 1999	Star of South Africa SSAG South African Police Star for Outstanding Service SOE
1 January 2000	General J. "Jackie" S. Selebi	2009	
July 2009	General Bheki H. Cele (Note: Subsequently Minister of Police)	Oct 2011	
2011	Lieutenant General Nhlanhla Mkhwanazi	2012	
2012	General Mangwashi Victoria Phiyega SOEG	2015	South African Police Service Gold Medal for Outstanding Service SOEG
15 Oct 2015	Lieutenant General Khomotso Phahlane (Note: Acting)	1 June 2017	
1 June 2017	Lieutenant General Lesetja Mothiba (Note: Acting)	22 Nov 2017	
22 Nov 2017	General Khehla John Sitole SOE (Note: Term ended by mutual agreement between him and the president)	31 March 2022	South African Police Star for Outstanding Service SOE
31 March 2022	General Sehlahle Fannie Masemola //	present	

== Battle honours ==
Police units earned battle honours in both world wars and in border wars with Rhodesia.

=== First World War ===
Battle Honours
First World War
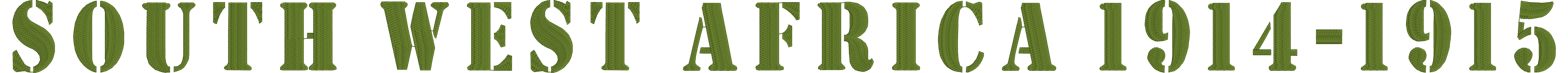
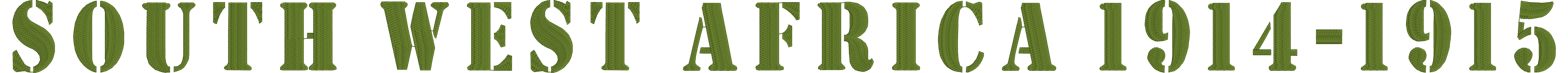
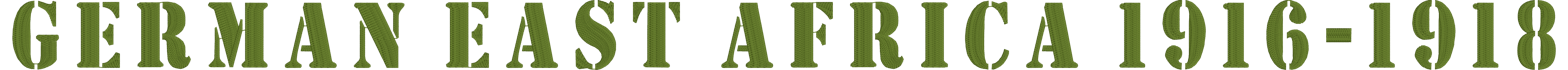

=== Second World War ===
Battle Honours
Second World War
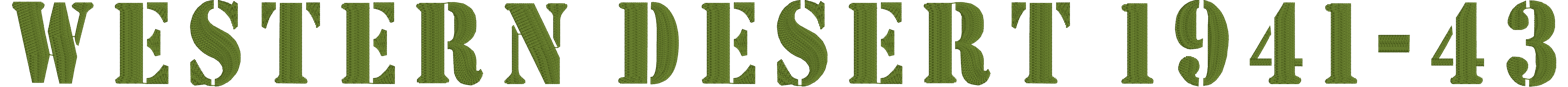
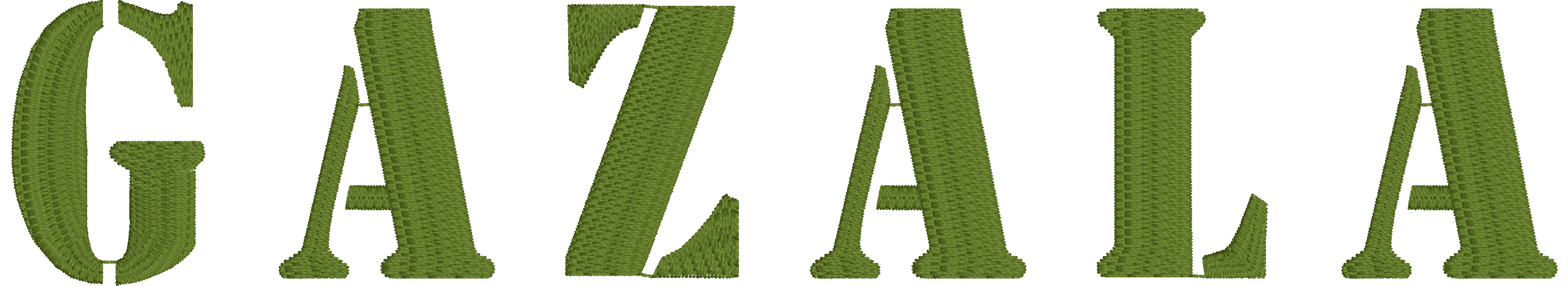
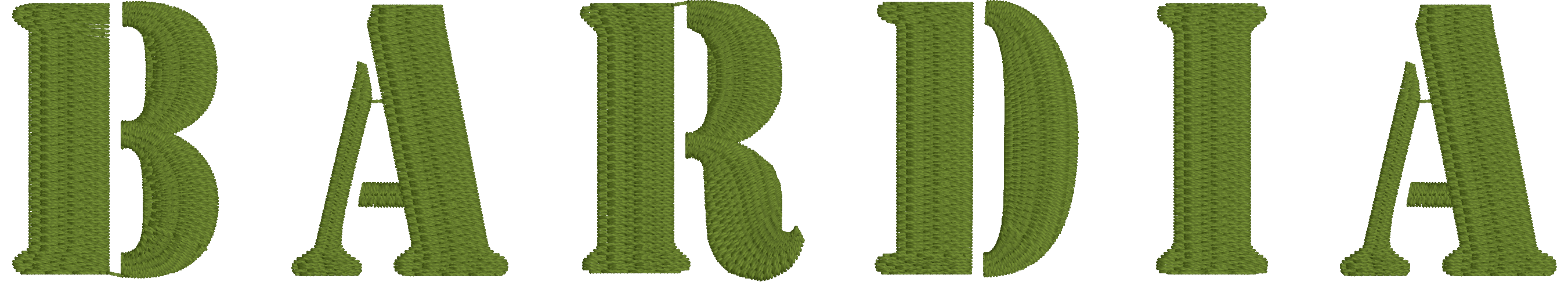
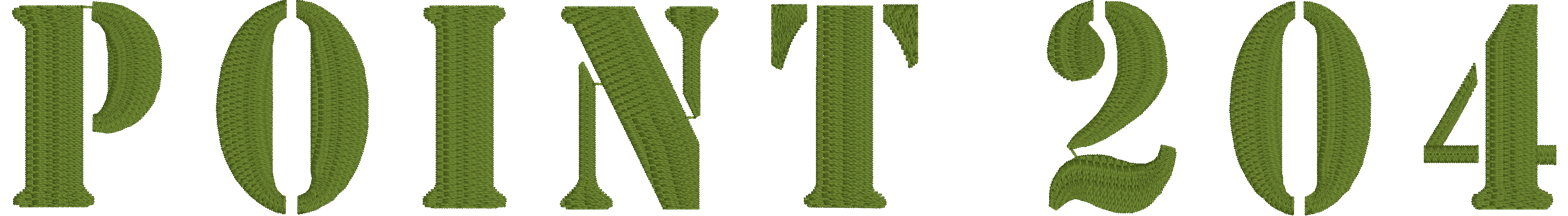
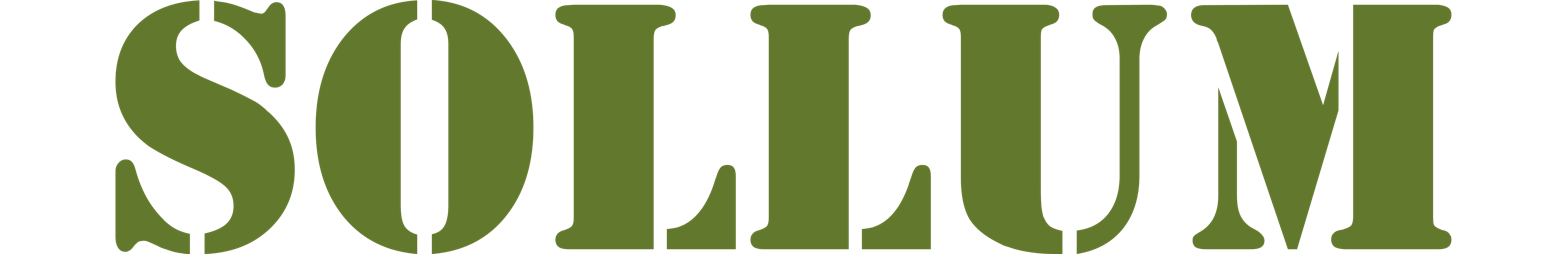
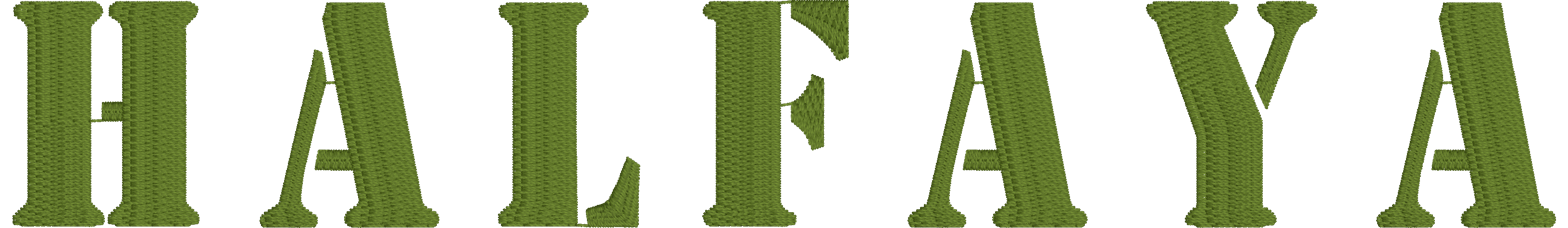
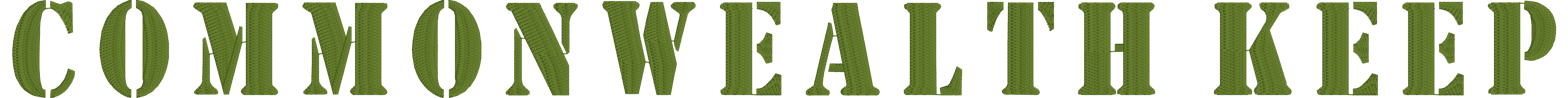
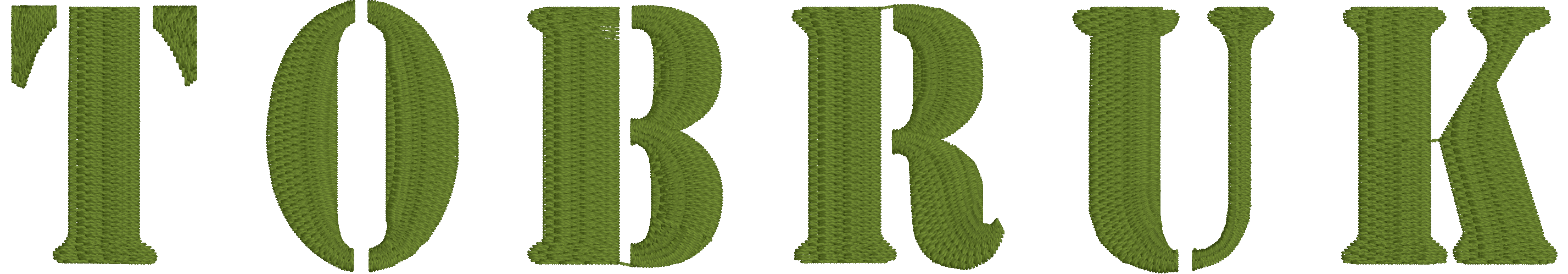

=== Other ===
Battle Honours
Others Awarded
Unknown code: Rhodesia_1967_77

== See also ==
- South African Police Service Occult-related Crimes Unit
- Hawks (Directorate for Priority Crime Investigation / SAPS)
- South African Police Service Special Task Force
- Political repression in post-apartheid South Africa
