= Petrus Johann Coetzee =

South African police officer

General Petrus Johann Coetzee SSA SED SOO SOE SD
- Born: 3 March 1928 (age 98); Smithfield, Free State
- Spouse: Yvonne van LeylevId (m. 1952)
- Police career
- Country: South Africa
- Allegiance: Republic of South Africa
- Branch: Republic of South Africa
- Service years: 1946–1987
- Rank: General
- Awards

General Johann Petrus Coetzee (born March 3, 1928) SSA SED SOO SOE SD is a South African police officer. He was Commissioner of the South African Police from 1983 to 1987.

== Personal life ==
Coetzee was born on the 3 March 1928 in Smithfield, Free State. He married Yvonne van Leylevid on 19 January 1952 in Johannesburg and has two children. He has degrees in political science and history.

== Career in the police ==
Coetzee joined the police on 10 May 1946 in Pretoria at the age of 16. He started his career in the Mounted Police, including as a member of the SA Police Royal Mounted Escort during the 1947 Royal visit to South Africa. Much of his career was spent in the Security Branch, where he co-ordinated the infiltration of anti-apartheid groups such as the South African Communist Party. As a young desk officer he recruited South Africa's first secret agent, Gerard Ludi, and as Security Chief he was the mentor of Major Craig Williamson, who had great success in infiltrating the International University Fund.

On 1 June 1983 he was made Commissioner of the South African Police; he was also a member of the State Security Council. He retired in May 1987.

While he was Commissioner, the South African Railway Police merged with the SA Police, a full-fledged Forensics branch was established and the SAP got a helicopter fleet.

"After the revolution, he will be my garden boy"

— Braam Fischer

Braam Fischer, the advocate who turned underground leader of the Communist Party, was ultimately unmasked by Coetzee, and arrested through the efforts of one of his agents, Gerad Ludi. Brigadiers Roelf van Rensburg and Kalfie Broodryk were the arresting Officers.

=== Awards ===
General Coetzee was awarded the South African Police Star for Outstanding Service for the bravery he showed when he walked into the bank, unarmed, to negotiate with the MK Cadres during the Silverton Siege in Pretoria in 1981.

- Star of South Africa (1952) (SSA)
- South African Police Star for Distinguished Leadership (SED)
- South African Police Star for Distinguished Service (SOO)
- South African Police Star for Outstanding Service (SOE)
- Southern Cross Decoration (SD)

== Truth and Reconciliation Commission ==
Coetzee, under cross-examination by George Bizos before the Truth and Reconciliation Commission, denied any involvement in several murders and other atrocities committed by the apartheid National Party government. He later applied for amnesty from the TRC in 2000.

== See also ==
- Johan Velde van der Merwe, fellow Commissioner of the South African Police
- South African Police
- Apartheid

Preceded by General Michiel Christian Wilhelm Geldenhuys	Commissioner of the South African Police; 1983–1987	Succeeded by General Hennie G. de Witt
