= Khehla John Sitole =

South African police official

General Khehla John Sitole SOE

National Commissioner of the South African Police Service
- In office 22 November 2017 – 31 March 2022 (Note: Term ended by mutual agreement between him and the president)
- President: Cyril Ramaphosa
- Preceded by: Lt General Lesetja Mothiba
- Succeeded by: Lt General Sehlahle Fannie Masemola

Personal details
- Party: African National Congress
- Police career
- Department: South African Police Service; South African Police
- Service years: 1986 – 2022
- Rank: General; Commissioner
- Awards: South African Police Star for Outstanding Service SOE South African Police Medal for Faithful Service South African Police Service Ten Year Commemoration Medal South African Police Service Twenty Year Loyal Service Medal South African Police Service World Cup 2010 Support Award South African Police Service Amalgamation Medal Centenary Medal - South African Police Service

General Khehla John Sitole SOE was National Commissioner of the South African Police Service from 2017 to 2022 when he left the post after consultation with the President of South Africa, Cyril Ramaphosa.

== Early life ==
He was born in Standerton, Mpumalanga and matriculated in 1984 from the Makhosana High School in Kwandebele.

== Career ==
Sitole joined the South African Police under the then-Apartheid government in 1986 as a Constable, initially part of the Armed Police in Orange Free State. He then served as a Detective in Johannesburg. In 1989, he was commissioned as a Lieutenant under a special programme and served in the Anti-Burglary Section of Johannesburg Police. From 1992 to 1995, he was a part of several Police Station forces in the Northern Province and Pretoria. In 1996, General Sitole was appointed as a senior manager with the rank of Captain and in 2000 was appointed as an Assistant Commissioner in Mpumalanga. In 2006, he was appointed as the Deputy Provincial Commissioner for Human Resource Management in the Northern Cape and in 2010 General Sitole was appointed as the Deputy Provincial Commissioner for Human Resource Management in the Free State.

From 2011 to 2013, General Sitole served as the Provincial Commissioner of the Free State with the rank of Lieutenant General and on the 1st October 2013 he was appointed as the Deputy National Commissioner, Policing.

On 1 March 2016, he was appointed as the Divisional Commissioner of Protection and Security Services, a post he held until 22 November 2017 when he was appointed by former South African president JG Zuma, as the National Commissioner of the South African Police Service.

He was embroiled in controversy almost from the beginning of his appointment. Sitole ultimately vacated the position after a scathing judgment handed down on 13 January 2021 by Judge Norman Davis in the Gauteng High Court.

=== Awards ===
He has received the following decorations:

- South African Police Star for Outstanding Service (SOE)
- South African Police Medal for Faithful Service
- South African Police Service Ten Year Commemoration Medal
- South African Police Service Twenty Year Loyal Service Medal
- South African Police Service World Cup 2010 Support Award
- South African Police Service Amalgamation Medal
- Centenary Medal - South African Police Service (Note: Celebrating 100 years of policing 1913–2013)

Unknown	Asst Commissioner: Mpumalanga Province; 2000–2006	Unknown
Unknown	Asst Commissioner: Northern Cape; 2006–2010	Unknown
Unknown	Asst Commissioner: Free State Province; 2010–2011	Unknown
Unknown	Provincial Commissioner: Free State Province (Lieutenant General); 2011–2013	Unknown
Unknown	Deputy National Commissioner: Policing; 2013–2016	Unknown
Unknown	Divisional Commissioner: Protection and Security Services; 2016–22 November 2017	Unknown
Preceded by Lt General Lesetja Mothiba	National Commissioner of the South African Police Service; 22 November 2017–31 March 2022	Succeeded by Lt General Sehlahle Fannie Masemola
