= Riah Phiyega =

South African Police Service commissioner

Commissioner Mangwashi Victoria Phiyega SOEG

Commissioner of the South African Police Service
- In office 12 June 2012 – 2015
- Preceded by: Bheki Cele
- Succeeded by: Khomotso Phahlane

Personal details
- Born: Burgersfort, Limpopo
- Education: University of the North
- Profession: Police officer
- Born: 29 May 1958 (age 68); Leolo, Limpopo, South Africa
- Other name: Riah
- Spouse: Elias Phiga (before 2012)
- Police career
- Allegiance: South Africa
- Department: South African Police Service
- Service years: 2012 – 2015
- Rank: Commissioner
- Awards: South African Police Service Gold Medal for Outstanding Service SOEG South African Police Service Ten Year Commemoration Medal South African Police Service World Cup 2010 Support Award South African Police Service Amalgamation Medal

Mangwashi Victoria Phiyega SOEG, commonly known as Riah Phiyega, was the National Police Commissioner of the South African Police Service. She was appointed to the office by South African President Jacob Zuma on 12 June 2012 and was the first woman to hold the post . Phiyega was suspended on 14 October 2015 by the President following a recommendation of the Farlam Commission of Inquiry into the deaths of protesting miners in Marikana in 2012.

== Early life and education ==
Phiyega was born on 29 May 1958 in the village of Leolo near Burgersfort and received her primary and secondary education at various schools in Limpopo.

She received a BA degree in Social Work from the University of the North (now called the University of Limpopo). She also received BA Hons degree in Social Sciences from Unisa, an MA degree in Social Sciences from the University of Johannesburg and a postgraduate diploma in Business Administration from the University of Wales in Cardiff.

== Career ==
=== Private sector ===
Phiyega was a Group Executive at Absa Bank Limited, a board member of Absa Actuaries and trustee of the Absa Foundation. She was also a Group Executive at Transnet and served on numerous Transnet subsidiaries. She was part of a team of senior executives who were responsible for the restructuring of the old Portnet into two major separate entities: Port Operations and Port Authority. Subsequent to the above restructuring, she became part of the Executive of the National Ports Authority of South Africa.

She served as Director for Development at the National Council for Child Welfare. She spent a few years at the Chamber of Mines as an employee well-being consultant. Prior to joining the South African Police Service, she was appointed as Chairperson of the Presidential State-Owned Enterprise Review Committee. The Committee was tasked with the responsibility of reviewing State-Owned Entities and to make recommendations for their future repositioning.

=== Government service ===
Phiyega was the vice chairperson for the Independent Commission for Remuneration of Public Office Bearers. She chaired the Road Traffic Management Corporation Investigation Task Team which looked into maladministration, corruption and poor corporate governance. The task team made major intervention and restructuring recommendations to the Minister of Transport, assisting to improve the corporation.

Phiyega has served in other significant national structures, which included serving as a board member of the 2010 Bid Committee that managed the hosting of the 2010 FIFA World Cup by South Africa and as commissioner for the Road Accident Fund Commission led by Judge Satchwell.

=== Police commissioner ===
Phiyega was appointed commissioner of the South African Police Service in 2012. At the time of her appointment the Mail and Guardian noted she had no prior police experience and "was sure to come under fire for this." Phiyega countered by explaining that her experience as a leader in the corporate world made her an effective manager and offered her a perspective that would be useful to the South African police.

==== Awards ====
In 2012 Phiyega's wearing of police medals was scrutinized by Democratic Alliance party spokeswoman Dianne Kohler Barnard The police ministry responded that they were satisfied that Phiyega met the requirements for the medals. Helmoed-Römer Heitman, an expert on South African military decorations, examined the specific medals and the conditions of issue at the request of media outlets and concluded he was "happy to accept that she deserves the medals.” Oscar Skommere, general secretary of the South African Police Union, however, criticized Phiyega's decorations and claimed that some police officers had been waiting to receive medals for which they qualified for more than 15 years.

- South African Police Service Gold Medal for Outstanding Service (SOEG)
- South African Police Service Ten Year Commemoration Medal
- South African Police Service World Cup 2010 Support Award
- South African Police Service Amalgamation Medal

=== Investigation ===
In 2015, following a three-year inquiry, the Farlam Commission, which had been charged with investigating the deaths of 34 miners shot to death by police in 2012 at a Lonmin mine in Marikana, recommended that Phiyega's fitness to hold office be investigated. Phiyega responded by noting she had only been on the job for two months at the time the killings occurred, having inherited an unworkable agency from her fired predecessor Bheki Cele. In a separate finding, the commission determined Phiyega had let "political considerations" influence her decisions as police commissioner, and had failed to act in an impartial manner. Provincial police commanders issued an open letter affirming their support of Phiyega.

=== Suspension ===
President Jacob Zuma suspended Phiyega on October 14, 2015. Subsequent to her suspension an investigation by a "reference group" appointed by police minister Nkosinathi Nhleko found Phiyega to have committed perjury and ignored internal processes when demoting, suspending and removing several senior officials.
