= Johan Velde van der Merwe =

South African police officer (1936–2022)

General Johan Velde van der Merwe SSAS SOE
- Born: 25 August 1936; Ermelo, Transvaal Province, South Africa
- Died: 27 August 2022 (aged 86)
- Police career
- Country: South Africa
- Allegiance: Republic of South Africa
- Department: South African Police
- Service years: 1953 – 1995
- Status: Deceased
- Rank: General

General Johan Velde van der Merwe SSAS SOE (25 August 1936 – 27 August 2022) was a South African police officer. He held senior positions in the Security Branch and was Commissioner of the South African Police from 1990 to 1995. He was implicated in the use of death squads, torture, and other human rights abuses as part of the apartheid government's crackdown on the then opposition.

== Early life ==
Van der Merwe was born in Ermelo in August 1936 to a family of conservative National Party supporters. He attended Ermelo High School and enjoyed sport. After leaving school, he joined the South African Police in 1953.

== Career in the police ==
=== Early career ===
Interviewed after retirement, van der Merwe related that he enjoyed his initial training. In 1961 he was posted to Standerton and placed in charge of administration of the new headquarters. From 1963 to 1966 he worked in an administrative role at Security Headquarters.

From 1966 to 1970, he commanded a border post at the South Africa-Lesotho border. When interviewed, he said that the Lesotho government under Leabua Jonathan enjoyed far less support than his superiors thought.

In 1970, he was transferred to the Security Branch in Bloemfontein. He eventually took command of all police operations in the Orange Free State. He claimed to have helped to prevent unrest during the Soweto uprising in the Free State due to his close relationships with parents of schoolchildren.

From 1979 he was posted to South West Africa, now Namibia, which South Africa then illegally controlled. He recalled in an interview that he had “almost unlimited legal powers” in Namibia due to the co-operation of the region's Administrator General; recalling his time in Namibia, he said that he “would not [have] miss[ed it]…for all the money in the world”.

=== Time in the Security Branch and as Commissioner ===
In 1983 he was transferred to Pretoria, where he rose initially from second in command of the Security Branch to Head of Security, before becoming Deputy Commissioner and then in 1990 Commissioner of the South African Police.

In 1985 he sent a report to the Minister of Police, Louis le Grange, requesting further powers, but was rebuked by the Minister. In van der Merwe's view, the apartheid government's response to the United Democratic Front (UDF) was hobbled by several factors: arrestees had the right to have the evidence against them furnished before the court, which would frequently identify informers, and it was very difficult to detain children who participated in the unrest. He says that at that time “the main drive for us as a Security Branch [was] to protect our people” and to maintain law and order.

The Truth and Reconciliation Commission (TRC) made a number of findings about his activities during this period.

- In 1985, van der Merwe took personal command of an operation to supply defective grenades to Congress of South African Students members with a view to killing any user who threw one.
- In collaboration with Adriaan Vlok, van der Merwe ordered the bombing of the headquarters of the Congress of South African Trade Unions in 1987; in their view, the bombing was the only viable means of responding to strikes, attacks on police, and other forms of resistance in which Cosatu had a role. Given its General Secretary had successfully challenged his detention in court, and use of that method drove family and friends of the detainee to opposition to the government, they did not consider lawful means to be effective.
- In 1988, van der Merwe ordered a cover-up of the unlawful killings of Stanza Bopape and Bheki Nkosi. Bopape was interrogated on 12 June 1988, during the course of which an "electric shock instrument" consisting of "two cords… pushed… against his body"; after repeated electrocution, he appeared to have died. Bopape's body was pushed into a crocodile hole.
- In that same year, in a meeting with other senior officials, it was decided to disrupt the screening of the movie Cry Freedom by use of bomb threats, after the government found it impossible to convince a committee it had itself appointed to ban it. The Commissioner of Police then banned the film under the State of Emergency regulations, claiming the film posed a danger to "public order and security".
- Another police general and van der Merwe "must have at least attempted to defeat the ends of justice" in "obtain[ing] bail [for] and…remov[ing]" members of "hit squads" trained at the instruction of the State Security Council and Mangosuthu Buthelezi's Inkatha Freedom Party.

Official support for these hit squads continued into van der Merwe's term as Commissioner.

Despite the handover of power from the National Party to a government of national unity under the provisions of an negotiated interim constitution, van der Merwe remained Commissioner until 1995.

== Retirement and death ==
In 1995 van der Merwe resigned from the police force. The Mail & Guardian newspaper reported that he was pressured to resign by the then Safety and Security Minister Sydney Mufamadi over accusations that he was obstructing investigations into other apartheid-era officers and alleged so-called Third Force activity.

With several other security policemen, van der Merwe successfully applied for amnesty from the TRC for various offences.

In 2007, van der Merwe along with Adriaan Vlok, an apartheid-era Minister of Law and Order, and several others was convicted of the attempted murder of Frank Chikane, an anti-apartheid priest, in 1989, and received a suspended prison sentence.

In 2016 van der Merwe demanded that the then president Jacob Zuma, former president Thabo Mbeki, and former senior ANC member Mac Maharaj should be charged for murder.

On 27 August 2022, van der Merwe died.

== See also ==
- South African Police
- Apartheid
- Petrus Johann Coetzee, a previous Commissioner of the South African Police

Preceded by General Hennie G. de Witt	Commissioner of the South African Police; 1990 – 1995	Succeeded by General John George Fivaz
