= Khomotso Phahlane =

South African police officer

National Commissioner of the South African Police Service
- In office 15 October 2015 – 1 June 2017
- Preceded by: Riah Phiyega
- Succeeded by: Lesetja Mothiba
- President: Cyril Ramaphosa
- Minister: Senzeni Zokwana

Personal details
- Party: African National Congress
- Police career
- Department: South African Police Service
- Service years: 2015–2017
- Rank: Acting Commissioner

Khomotso Johannes Phahlane is the former acting National Commissioner of the South African Police Service (SAPS), serving from 15 October 2015 to 1 June 2017. He was appointed after the suspension of Riah Phiyega. He was previously head of the SAPS Forensic Service from 2012 to 2015.

In February 2018, Phahlane and his wife appeared in court on charges of fraud and corruption.

On 30 July 2020, Phahlane was dismissed from the police after 3 years on suspension, after being found guilty of dishonest conduct. On 12 October 2020, Lieutenant-General Bonang Mgwenya, the country’s second-most senior police official and Phalane's former second-in-command, was arrested on charges of corruption, fraud, theft and money laundering involving about R200-million and afterwards appeared in Ridge Magistrates’ court. At the time of Mgwenya's arrest, she and Phahlane were among 14 fellow officers who were charged with corruption.

In September 2025, Phahlane returned to the Labour Appeal Court to get his job back.

Preceded by Riah Phiyega	National Commissioner of the South African Police Service	Succeeded by Lesetja Mothiba
