= Isaac Pierre de Villiers =

Major General Isaac Pierre de Villiers CB MC KStJ
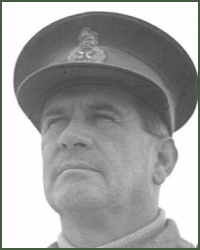
- Born: 20 August 1891; Somerset East, Cape Colony
- Died: 11 October 1967 (aged 76); Pretoria, Transvaal
- Spouse: Vivienne Marais (m. 1936))
- Military career
- Allegiance: South Africa
- Branch: South African Army
- Service years: 1914–1945
- Rank: Major General
- Service number: 254100
- Unit: Royal Field Artillery (WWI)
- Commands: GOC 2nd South African Infantry Division (1940–42); GOC Coastal Area Command (1942–45)
- Conflicts: North African campaign
- Awards: Order of the Bath CB Military Cross MC Venerable Order of Saint John KStJ
- Other work: Attorney; Commissioner, South African Police; Chairman, Immigrants Selection Board

Major-General Isaac Pierre de Villiers CB MC KStJ (20 August 1891 – 11 October 1967) was a South African military commander and police official. Originally an attorney by profession, he served in the Royal Field Artillery during World War I, and was awarded the Military Cross. In 1928, he was appointed a lieutenant colonel in the South African Police, later succeeding to the post of Commissioner.

== Early life ==
He was born in Somerset East, Cape Colony on 20 August 1891 to Jan S. de Villiers of Cape Town. He was educated at the South African College School in Cape Town and the University of Cape Town.

== Military service ==
He was commissioned in the Royal Artillery during World War I, serving in German South-West Africa and the Western Front. He was awarded the Military Cross while serving in the 68th Brigade.

Back in South Africa in 1919, he joined his father's law firm but in 1928, was appointed Commissioner of Police for the Union of South Africa.

He volunteered for military service in World War II, and served as General Officer Commanding 2nd South African Infantry Division from 1940 to 1942. He trained the division, which incorporated a police battalion, and commanded them in internal security operations at the beginning of the war, then commanded the division in North Africa in 1941 and 1942, for which he was made a Companion of the Bath (CB). During this campaign units under his command, including New Zealand cavalry, were responsible for the capture of Bardia, but many of the South African division's personnel were taken prisoner of war at Tobruk.

From 1942 to 1945, he commanded the Coastal Area Command, responsible for the coastal defence of South Africa. In this capacity he was called upon to co-operate with the Royal Navy, and made a name both by his determination to make a success of his command and by his scrupulous fairness in dealing with individuals.

In addition to the honours for his military service, he was appointed a Commander in the Venerable Order of Saint John in 1936, and a Knight in the same order in 1943.

=== Awards ===
- Order of the Bath (Companion) (CB)
- Military Cross (MC)
- Venerable Order of Saint John (Gr II - Knight of Justice or Grace) (KStJ)

== Family life ==
He married Vivienne Marais in 1936. He retired in 1945, but was chairman of the Immigrants Selection Board from 1946 to 1948. He died in Pretoria on 11 October 1967.

== See also ==
- "Militaria". Official Professional Journal of the SADF. 12 (2). 1982.
- Brewer, John D. (1994). Black and Blue: Policing in South Africa. Oxford University Press. ISBN 0198273827.

Military offices
Preceded by Colonel Sir Theodorus Gustaff Truter CMG KBE KPM	Commissioner of the South African Police; 1928–1940	Succeeded by Brigadier George Robson Carruthers Baston
Unknown	GOC 2nd South African Infantry Division; 1940–1942	Unknown
Unknown	GOC Coastal Area Command; 1942–1945	Unknown
