= South African Police =

Law enforcement agency from 1913 to 1994

South African Police Suid-Afrikaanse Polisie
- South African Police badge

- Flag of the South African Police (1981–1994)
- Common name: South African Police
- Abbreviation: SAP

Agency overview
- Formed: 1913
- Preceding agency: Various
- Dissolved: 1994
- Superseding agency: South African Police Service
- Employees: 130,000 (April 1994); 65,000 (1975)

Jurisdictional structure
- Operations jurisdiction: RSA
- Legal jurisdiction: South Africa
- Governing body: Department of Police (South Africa)
- General nature: Local civilian police

Operational structure
- Units: Criminal Investigation Department; Crime Scene; C1

The South African Police (SAP) was the national police force and law enforcement agency in South Africa from 1913 to 1994; it was the de facto police force in the territory of South West Africa (Namibia) from 1939 to 1981. After South Africa's transition to majority rule in 1994, the SAP was reorganized into the South African Police Service (SAPS).

== History ==
The South African Police were the successors to the police forces of the Cape Colony, the Natal Colony, the Orange River Colony, and the Transvaal Colony in law enforcement in South Africa. Proclamation 18 formed the South African Police on 1 April 1913 with the amalgamation of the police forces of the four old colonies after the founding of the Union of South Africa in 1910. The first Commissioner of Police was Colonel Theo G. Truter with 5,882 men under his command. The SAP originally policed cities and urban areas, while the South African Mounted Riflemen (SAMR), a branch of the Union Defence Force, enforced the state's writ in rural areas. The SAMR maintained law and order in the Transkei and parts of the Eastern Cape, in Natal other than Durban and Pietermaritzburg, parts of the Orange Free State, Northern and North-west Transvaal, and Griqualand West, Bechuanaland and the Gordonia district. During World War I, the SAP took over the Riflemen's jurisdiction, and most Riflemen personnel were transferred to the SAP by the end of the 1910s. The SAMR resumed their policing duties in 1920. By 1926, the South African Mounted Riflemen were disbanded and their duties were taken over by the South African Police.

In 1927, independent police forces in Pietermaritzburg were amalgamated with the South African Police and in 1936, Durban's police force followed suit. On 1 June 1939, the SAP took over the South West African Police and became responsible for policing South West Africa, which was under South African administration at that time.

Police officials often called on the army for support in emergencies. In turn, one SAP brigade served with the 2nd Infantry Division of the South African Army in North Africa during World War II. After the war, the South African Police joined INTERPOL on 1 January 1948.

When the conservative National Party edged out liberal opponents in South Africa's elections in 1948, the new government enacted legislation strengthening the relationship between the police and the military. The police were heavily armed after that, especially when facing unruly or hostile crowds. The Police Act (No. 7) of 1958 broadened the mission of the SAP beyond conventional police functions, such as maintaining law and order and investigating and preventing crime and gave the police extraordinary powers to quell unrest and to conduct counterinsurgency activities. The Police Amendment Act (No. 70) of 1965 empowered the police to search without warrant any person, receptacle, vehicle, aircraft, or premise within one mile of any national border and to seize anything found during such a search. This search-and-seize zone was extended to within eight miles of any border in 1979 and to the entire country in 1983. Among the SAP's spies during the apartheid era was the infamous Craig Williamson and his best-known female recruit Olivia Forsyth.

The SAP relinquished its responsibility for South West Africa in 1981. It took over the South African Railways Police Force in 1986.

== Leadership ==
The following people have served as the Commissioner of the South African Police:

Commissioners of the South African Police
From	Commissioners	To	Ribbon
1913	Col Sir Theodorus Gustaff Truter CMG,KBE,KPM	1928	Order of St Michael and St George CMG Order of the British Empire KBE King's Police Medal KPM
1928	Maj Isaac Pierre de Villiers CB,MC,KStJ	1940	Order of the Bath CB Military Cross MC Venerable Order of Saint John KStJ
1940	Brig George Robson Carruthers Baston KPM (Note: Brig George CR Baston was acting Commissioner of the South African Police Force (1940 - 1945) whilst Maj Gen IP de Villiers served in the Union Defence Force)	1945	King's Police Medal KPM
1 August 1945	Maj Robert John Palmer CVO,KPM,DSO & 2 Bars (Note: General Palmer was awarded the DSO and two bars, that is three awards of the DSO as well as the American Bronze Star.)	1951	Royal Victorian Order CVO King's Police Medal KPM Distinguished Service Order and two Bars DSO & 2 Bars
1951	Maj Jan-Kamas Brink	1954	
1954	Maj Corrie I. Rademeyer	1960	
1960	Lieutenant General Hendrik Jacobus du Plooy MVO	1962	Royal Victorian Order MVO
1962	Lieutenant General Johannes Martinus Keevy	1968	
1968	General Johannes Petrus Gous	1971	
1971	General G. J. Joubert SOO	1973	South African Police Star for Distinguished Service SOO
1973	General Theodorus J. Crous	1975	
1975	General Gert L. Prinsloo	1978	
1978	General Michiel Christian Wilhelm Geldenhuys SED,SOO,SOE,SD	1983	South African Police Star for Distinguished Leadership SED South African Police Star for Distinguished Service SOO South African Police Star for Outstanding Service SOE Southern Cross Decoration SD
1 June 1983	General Petrus Johann Coetzee SSA,SED,SOO,SOE,SD	1987	Star of South Africa SSA South African Police Star for Distinguished Leadership SED South African Police Star for Distinguished Service SOO South African Police Star for Outstanding Service SOE Southern Cross Decoration SD
1987	General Hennie G. de Witt	1989	
1990	General Johan Velde van der Merwe SSAS,SOE	1996	Star of South Africa SSAS South African Police Star for Outstanding Service SOE

== Ranks ==
=== Officers ===
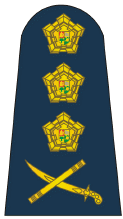
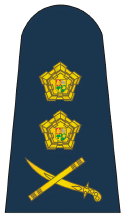
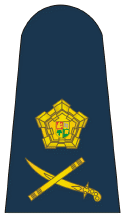
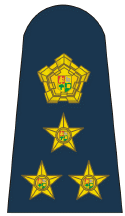
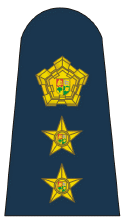
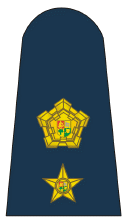
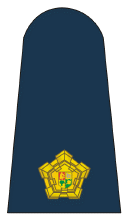
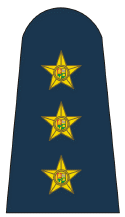
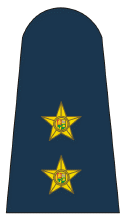
Rank group	General / flag officers				Senior officers			Junior officers
South African Police (1961–1994)
South African Police (1961–1994)	General; Generaal	Lieutenant general Luitenant-Generaal	Major general Generaal-Majoor	Brigadier; Brigadier	Colonel; Kolonel	Lieutenant colonel Luitenant-Kolonel	Major; Majoor	Captain; Kaptein	Lieutenant; Luitenant

=== Other ranks ===
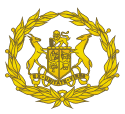
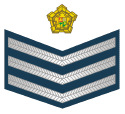
Rank group	Senior NCOs			Junior NCOs	Enlisted
South African Police (1961–1994)
South African Police (1961–1994)	Warrant Officer; Adjudant-Offisier	Sergeant; Sersant	Lance Sergeant; Ondersersant		Constable; Konstabel

== Special Units ==
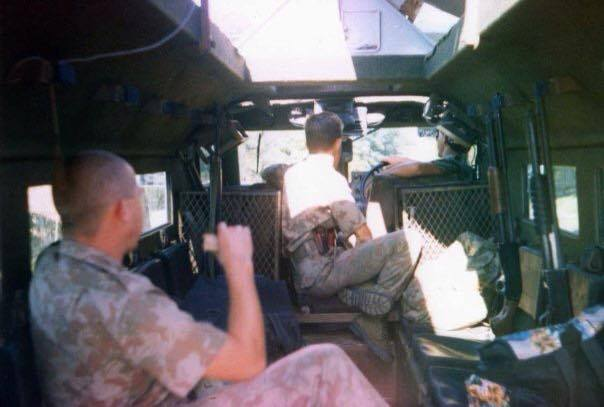
Members of the Internal Stability Division inside a Casspir armoured vehicle in 1993

There were a number of special units within the police, formed either to carry out a specific task or to deal with a particular area of crime.

=== Koevoet ===
Koevoet, translated into English as 'crowbar', but officially known as the Police Counter-Insurgency Unit (COIN) or 'Operation K' was a major paramilitary police unit in South African-administered South West Africa, now the Republic of Namibia. Active during the Namibian War of Independence from 1979 to 1989, they were held responsible for committing multiple human rights violations, and alongside the South West African Police, they were disbanded following Namibian independence in 1989, and were essentially replaced by the Special Field Force in modern-day Namibia.

=== Special Task Force ===
Formed following a need to defend the border between South Africa and Rhodesia during the Rhodesian Bush War, the Special Task Force was unofficially founded in 1967, and began to be trained to use advanced tactics, such as survival and bush skills, to carry out COIN operations, and drastically reduce police casualties – this unit was nicknamed 'the Bliksems'. By 1975, support for creating the Special Task Force reached the Bureau of State Security, following both the Fox Street Siege, in which the police were unable to deal with a hostage crisis at the Israeli embassy in Johannesburg, and the outbreak of the conflict in South West Africa, stretching the demand of COIN operatives. Finally, authorization of creating the Specialist Task Force was given, following multiple recommendations, and the issues described beforehand. This unit is still in action in modern-day South Africa.

=== Division: Internal Stability ===
Formed in 1992 in the run-up to the 1994 South African election following the end of Apartheid, 'Division: Internal Stability' were tasked with the important role of combating violence in the turbulent years leading up to and after the elections. The unit consisted of 41 divisions, and proved invaluable to preventing potentially thousands of killings during major political violence.

== Upholding apartheid ==
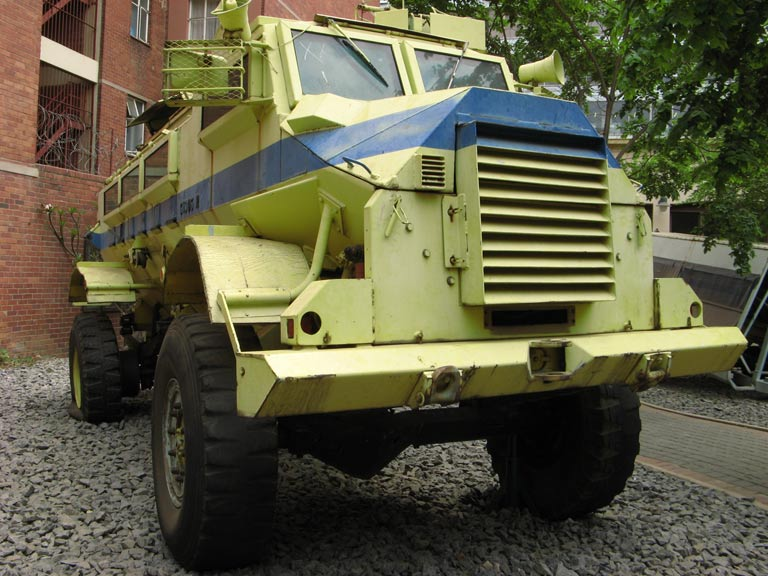
The Casspir, an armoured personnel carrier used by the SAP.

During South Africa's rule under apartheid, the SAP operated to quell civil unrest amongst the country's disenfranchised non-white majority. During emergencies they were assisted by the military. Beyond the conventional police functions of upholding order and solving crime, the SAP employed counterinsurgency and intimidation tactics against anti-apartheid activists and critics of the white minority government. From 1961 to 1990, a total of 67 people died in South African Police detention from hanging and torture as well as natural causes as claimed by the Police.

=== Sharpeville massacre ===
On 21 March 1960, SAP officers in the Transvaal township of Sharpeville opened fire on a large anti-apartheid protest outside of the local police station, killing 69 demonstrators and injuring 180 others. Police reports from the time of the massacre claimed that panicking officers spontaneously fired into an increasingly violent crowd; however, other sources claim that the demonstration was peaceful in the moment leading up to the shooting. Evidence given to the Truth and Reconciliation Commission in 1998 suggested "a degree of deliberation in the decision to open fire" by the police.

=== Vlakplaas ===
In 1983, the SAP formed C1, a counterinsurgency unit commanded by police colonel and former Koevoet operator Eugene de Kock. C1 was run out of a secluded farmhouse called Vlakplaas until 1992. It functioned as a paramilitary hit squad, capturing political opponents of the National Party government and either "turning" or executing them. C1 was also responsible for several fatal bomb attacks against anti-apartheid activists, including members of the African National Congress. The Vlakplaas farm became the site of multiple executions of political opponents of the apartheid government.

== Reserve ==
The Police Reserve, established in 1973, enabled the government to recall former police personnel for active duty for thirty to ninety days each year, and for additional service in times of emergency. Another reserve (volunteer) force was established in 1966, consisting of unpaid, mostly White civilians willing to perform limited police duties. A youth wing of this reserve force reported that it had inducted almost 3,000 students and young people to assist the police during the late 1980s.

The police increased the use of part-time, specialised personnel – such as the special constables (called kitskonstabels (instant constables) in Afrikaans) – to help quell the growing violence in the 1980s. In 1987, for example, the police recruited almost 9,000 kitskonstabels and gave them an intensive six-week training course. Most of these constables were Blacks and Coloreds. These "instant" police assistants were then armed with non-lethal weapons and assigned to areas of unrest, which were often the most turbulent townships. Even with training courses extended to three months, their often brutal and inept performance contributed to the growing hostility between the police and the public by the late 1980s.

Although the mission of the SAP grew well beyond conventional policing responsibilities during the 1970s, the size of the police force declined relative to population. In 1981 the police force of roughly 48,991 represented a ratio of less than 1.5 police per 1,000 people, down from 1.67 per 1,000 people in the 1960s. Alarmed by the increased political violence and crime in the mid-1980s and by the lack of adequate police support, officials then increased the size of the police force to 93,600—a ratio of 2.7 per 1,000 people—by 1991.

The police were authorised to act on behalf of other government officials when called upon. For example, in rural areas and small towns, where there may be no public prosecutor available, police personnel could institute criminal proceedings. The police could legally serve as wardens, court clerks, and messengers, as well as immigration, health, and revenue officials. In some circumstances, the police were also authorised to serve as vehicle inspectors, postal agents, and local court personnel.

After President Frederik Willem de Klerk lifted the ban on black political organisations and released leading dissidents from prison in 1990, he met with the police and ordered them help end apartheid, to demonstrate greater political tolerance, and to improve their standing in black communities.

Through the early 1980s, police units were integrated, but most police recruits had been trained in single-race classes, sometimes in institutions designated for one racial group. For example, most black police personnel had trained at Hammanskraal, near Pretoria; most whites, in Pretoria; most coloureds, Bishop Lavis, near Cape Town; and Asians at Chatsworth, near Durban. During the late 1980s, the Hammanskraal college saw a large enrollment of black policemen.

As the apartheid era ended, these programs were restructured to emphasise racial tolerance and respect for basic human rights. The first racially integrated intake of recruits began slowly in 1993 and integration was complete by 1995. Today there is only one Police College to train new recruits in Pretoria. The police also increased recruitment among black youth and hired international police training experts to advise them on ways to improve race relations in the service.

The basic police training regimen includes courses in criminal investigation procedures, self-defense, musketry, tactical weapons training, drills, inspections, public relations and law. Specialized courses include crowd and riot control, detective skills, horsemanship and veterinary training, and advanced-level management skills. Their basic training lasted 6 months. During the time of the South African Border War, all policemen were required to complete a 6-week intensive counterinsurgency (C.O.I.N.) training at Maleoskop (now closed) in specialised weapons and "bush warfare" in preparation for their 3 months "call up". (Some volunteering and been called up more frequently.) Since 1990, South Africa also has provided training for police from Lesotho, Swaziland, Malawi and (then) Zaire.

The climate of escalating violence in the early 1990s often posed even greater challenges to the police than they had faced in the 1980s, as violence shifted from anti-government activity to a mosaic of political rivalries and factional clashes. At the same time, many South Africans feared that the police were causing some of the criminal and political violence, and they demanded immediate changes in the police force to mark the end of apartheid-era injustices.

To meet the new challenges, the 91,000 active police personnel in 1991, including administrative and support personnel, were increased to more than 110,000 by 1993 and 140,000 by 1995. Throughout this time, police reserves numbered at least 37,000. In 1996 the combined active and reserve police represented a police-to-population ratio of almost 4.0 per 1,000.

As part of the overall reorganisation of the police, the government merged the formerly dreaded Criminal Investigation Department (CID) and the police Security Branch to form a Crime Combatting and Investigation (CCI) Division. The new CCI, with responsibility for reversing the rising crime rate, combined the intelligence and operational resources of the security police with the anticrime capabilities of the CID.

Minister of Law and Order Hernus Kriel in 1991 also appointed an ombudsman to investigate allegations of police misconduct. He increased the recruitment of black police personnel, formed a civilian riot-control unit that was separate from the SAP but worked with it, developed a code of police conduct agreed upon by a number of political parties and communities, and substantially increased police training facilities. In 1992 Kriel began restructuring the SAP into a three-tiered force consisting of a national police, primarily responsible for internal security and for serious crime; autonomous regional forces, responsible for crime prevention and for matters of general law and order; and municipal police, responsible for local law enforcement and for minor criminal matters. He also established police/community forums in almost every police station.

In 1995, the force absorbed the police forces of Bophuthatswana, Ciskei, Gazankulu, KaNgwane, KwaNdebele. KwaZulu, Lebowa, QwaQwa, Transkei, and Venda, and was renamed the South African Police Service.

== Battle honours ==
Battle Honours
Awarded to the South African Police
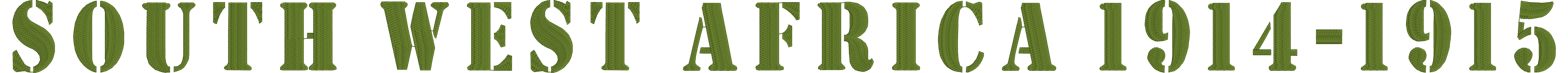
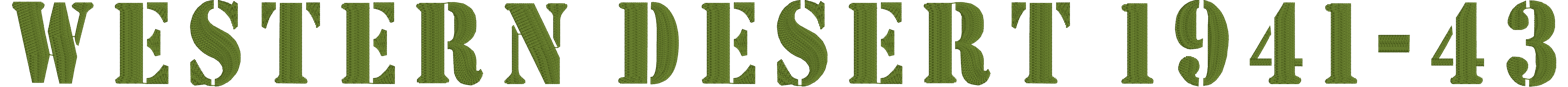
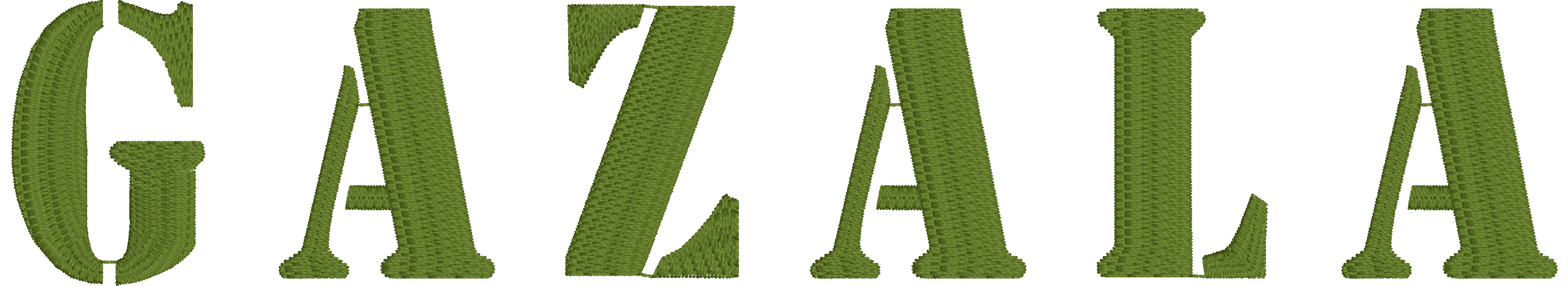
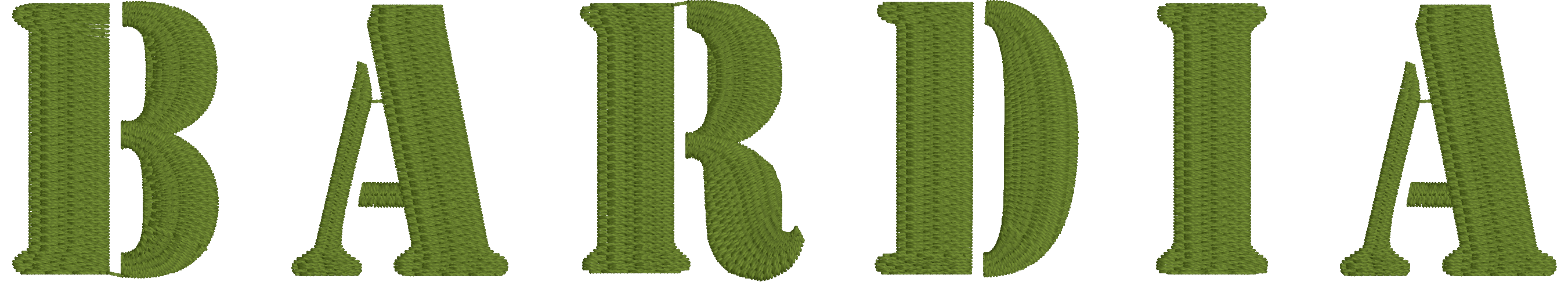
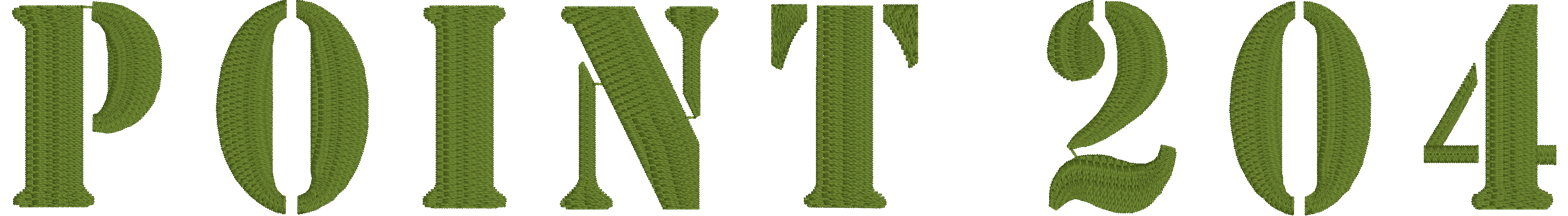
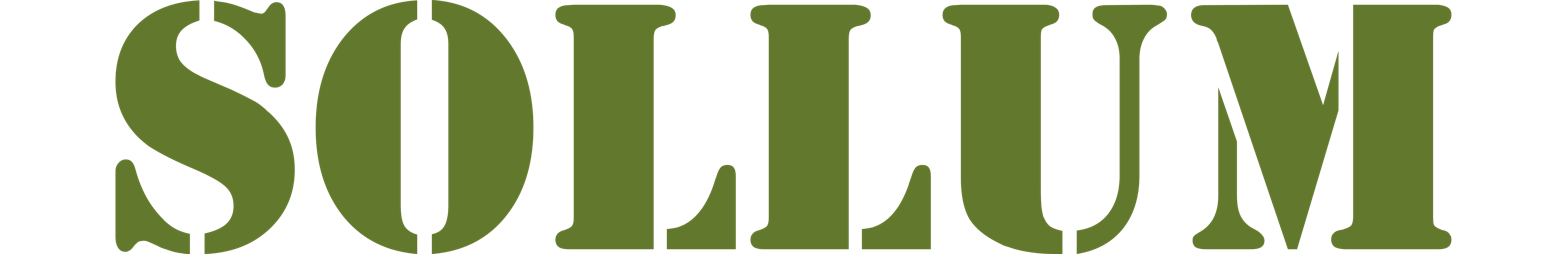
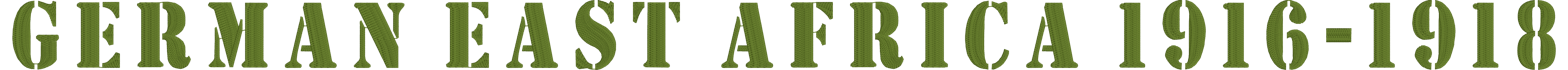
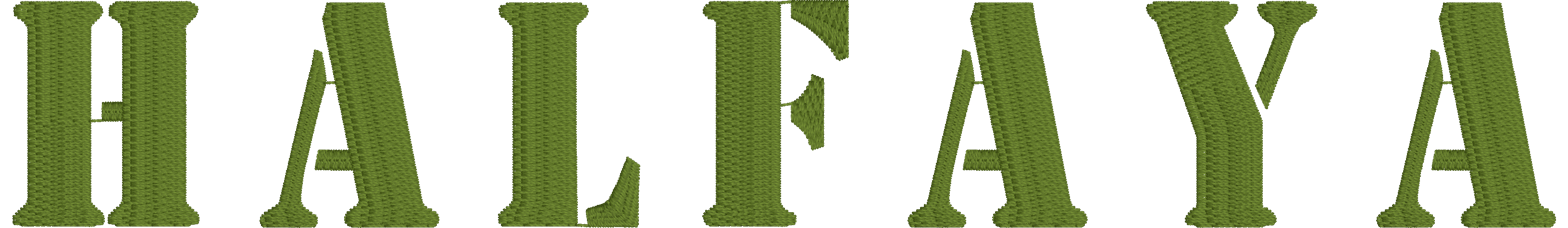
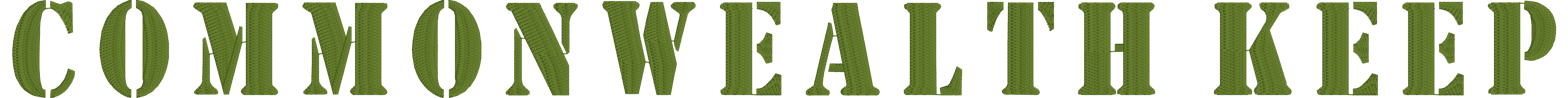
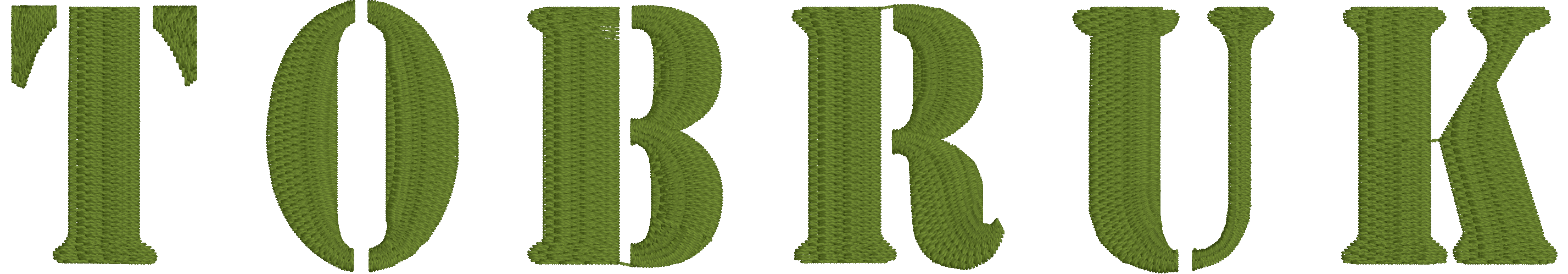
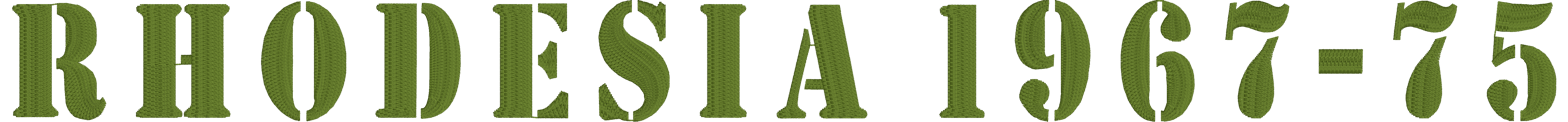

== Medals and decorations ==
Policemen and women were eligible for a number of awards. These included:

=== 1923–1963 ===
The SAP was eligible for the British King's Police Medal, which was awarded annually throughout the British Empire. This was discontinued in 1933, because South Africa had become independent as a member of the new British Commonwealth, and it was replaced in 1937 by a special South African issue of the medal. From 1923, the SAP also had its own long service medal, which doubled as a medal for gallantry. The medals available to the SAP between 1923 and 1963 were thus:

==== Decoration ====
- Queen's Police Medal (South Africa) (1937–61)

==== Campaign medal ====
- 1943: Africa Service Medal (WWII)

==== Long service medal ====
- Police Good Service Medal (1923–63)

Until 1952, they were incorporated into the British honours system. Thereafter they formed part of the new South African honours system.

=== 1963–2003 ===
After South Africa became a republic (in 1961), the government instituted an entirely new series of decorations and medals for the SAP. It was added to several times over the years:

==== Decorations ====

- 1979 – 1986: South African Police Star for Distinguished Leadership (SED)
- 1979 – 1986: South African Police Star for Distinguished Service (SOO) (Note: (SOO) - 2nd Type)
- 1963 – 1989: South African Police Cross for Bravery (PCF) (Note: (PCF) - 1st Type (1963-89))
- 1989 – 2004: South African Police Cross for Bravery (Gold) (PCFG)
- 1985 – 1989: South African Police Silver Cross for Gallantry (Silver) (SCG)
- 1989 – 2004: South African Police Cross for Bravery (Silver) (PCFS)
- 1989 – 2004: South African Police Cross for Bravery (PCF) (Note: (PCF) - 2nd Type (1989-2004))
- 1963 – 1979: South African Police Star for Distinguished Service (SOO) (Note: (SOO) - 1st Type)
- 1979 – 2004: South African Police Star for Outstanding Service (SOE)

==== Campaign medal ====
- 1974 – 1995: South African Police Medal for Combating Terrorism

==== Commemorative medals ====
- 1988: South African Police Seventy-Fifth Anniversary Commemorative Medal
- 1995: South African Police Service Amalgamation Medal

==== Long service medals ====
- 1963 – 2004: South African Police Star for Merit
- 1979 – 2004: South African Police Star for Faithful Service
- 1963 – 2004: South African Police Medal for Faithful Service

== See also ==
- Bureau of State Security (BOSS)
- Cape Mounted Police
- List of law enforcement agencies in South Africa
- South West African Police
- The Gugulethu Seven
