= Theodorus Gustaff Truter =

Former police official in South Africa and Commissioner of the South African Police

Colonel Sir Theodorus Gustaff Truter KBE CMG KPM
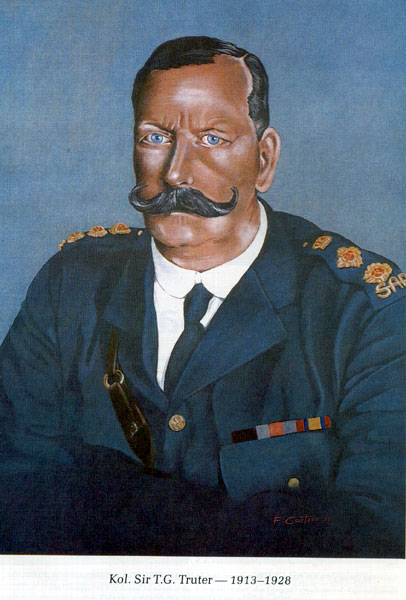
- Born: 13 October 1873; George, Cape Colony
- Died: 11 April 1949 (aged 75); Pretoria, Transvaal
- Spouse: Henriëtta Martina nee Wagter (m. 1902);
- Police career
- Country: Union of South Africa
- Allegiance: Union of South Africa
- Branch: Union of South Africa
- Service years: 1913 – 1928
- Rank: Colonel
- Awards: Order of the British Empire KBE Order of St Michael and St George CMG King's Police Medal KPM

Colonel Sir Theodorus Gustaff Truter KBE CMG KPM (13 October 1873 – 11 April 1949) was a police official. He served as the first South African Police Commissioner from the establishment of the South Africa Police in 1913, until his retirement on 30 November 1928.

== Early life ==
He attended high school in George and the Normaalkollege in Cape Town. He then attended the Diocesan College in Rondebosch, after which he passed the law exam for the State Service through private study.

== Work ==
On 2 December 1892, he began work as a clerk in the office of the Colonial Secretary in Cape Town. He was later promoted to the post of Chief Accounting Controller in that office.

With the outbreak of the Second Anglo-Boer War during 1899, he joined the 2nd Battalion of the Light Horse Regiment as a trooper. He was later commissioned as an officer. With the occupation of Pretoria, he was appointed as the Chief Clerk of the Magistrate's Court, and on 16 March 1901 as the Assistant Magistrate of Pretoria. On 1 December 1904, he was appointed as the Resident Magistrate of Ermelo and was transferred on 1 April 1908 to the same post for the Standerton region.

On 1 July 1910, he was appointed as the Secretary of the Administrator of the Transvaal and began the job of reorganising the department.

== Police service ==
With the creation of the Union of South Africa on 31 May 1910, each of the constituent provinces had their own separate police force, with their own Police Commissioner in charge of each one. On 15 October 1910, Truter was promoted to the rank of Colonel and installed as the Commissioner of the Transvaal police force with oversight responsibility for the other three province's forces.

The promulgation of the Police Act, Act 14 of 1912, brought a new police force into being on 1 April 1913. Truter was appointed as the first Commissioner of the new South African Police, a post he would occupy for eighteen years.

Truter famously refused the rank of General in the South African Police.

=== Awards ===
As a token of appreciation for his contribution to the amalgamation of the various forces into one Police Force, on 31 December 1917 he received the Companion of the Order of St Michael and St George (CMG) as well as the rank title, “Sir”. On 3 June 1924 he was knighted with the award of the Knight Commander of the British Empire (KBE).

- Order of the British Empire (Knight Commander) (KBE)
- Order of St Michael and St George (Companion) (CMG)
- King's Police Medal (Distinguished Service) (KPM)

On 30 November 1928, Truter retired after a period of 36 years in the service of the state. However, this was not the end of his service, because during the Second World War (1939-45) he was appointed chief control officer of the South African Internment Camps. Furthermore, he distinguished himself as a versatile sportsman, he also served on the management of several organisations in Pretoria.

== Personal life ==
On 25 May 1902, Truter married Henriëtta Martina Wagter in Pretoria, with whom he had two sons and a daughter.

Truter died on 11 May 1949, at the age of 76.

== Notes ==
New command	Commissioner of the South African Police; 1913–1928	Succeeded by Major General Isaac Pierre de Villiers CB MC KStJ
