= South African Police Star for Distinguished Leadership =

High-ranking police decoration in South Africa

SA Police Star for Distinguished Leadership
- Ribbon: 37mm, gold, with a white-blue-white centre panel.
- Type: Decoration
- Awarded for: Distinguished leadership
- Country: Republic of South Africa
- Presented by: South African Police
- Eligibility: SAP general officers.
- Status: Discontinued 1986

The South African Police Star for Distinguished Leadership was a high-ranking decoration, that existed between 1979 and 1986. It was reserved for senior police officers and was awarded only twice. Recipients were entitled to use the post-nominal letters SED, standing for Stella Excellentis Ductus, the Latin form of the name.

Instituted on 1 May 1979, the SED was awarded to general officers of the South African Police for distinguished leadership, meritorious service contributing to state security, and outstanding service to heads of state or government. Both recipients were Commissioners of the SAP.

The SED is a gold Maltese cross with rays between the arms. In the centre is depicted a stylised aloe plant on a blue-bordered white disc on a gold diamond-shaped plaque. The reverse has the national coat of arms and the words Stella Excellentis Ductus.

On ceremonial occasions, the SED was worn on a gold collar. On other occasions, it was worn on a neck ribbon of old-gold, with a white-blue-white centre panel. There is also a four-pointed multi-rayed breast star.

The SED was discontinued on 1 September 1986. After that date, police generals were awarded the Order of the Star of South Africa (Non-Military) instead.

== See also ==
- South African civil honours
- South African police decorations
