= South African Police Star for Distinguished Service =

SA Police Star for Distinguished Service
- Ribbon: 32mm, white, with green and red stripes on the left and orange and blue on the right
- Type: Decoration
- Awarded for: Particular gallantry or outstanding service (until 1979); meritorious service (from 1979).
- Country: Republic of South Africa
- Presented by: South African Police
- Eligibility: All ranks until 1979, thereafter only general officers.
- Status: Discontinued 1986.

The South African Police Star for Distinguished Service was a high-ranking decoration that existed between 1963 and 1986. Originally a dual-purpose decoration for bravery and for outstanding service, it was converted into an award for senior officers only in 1979. Recipients were entitled to use the post-nominal letters SOO, standing for Stella Officii Optimi, the Latin form of the name.

Instituted on 20 May 1963, retrospective to 31 May 1961, the SOO superseded the Queen's Police Medal. It was awarded to all ranks of the South African Police, for particular gallantry, or for outstanding service, resourcefulness, leadership, or sense of responsibility and personal example.

When the SAP awards system was revised in 1979, the SOO was re-defined as a decoration for general officers who had rendered meritorious service promoting the efficiency of the SAP and contributing actively to national security. A new decoration, the SA Police Star for Outstanding Service, was instituted to replace the SOO's original role.

The SOO is a gold six-pointed multi-rayed star. On the obverse is a green six-pointed star depicting the "torch of life", the "wings of peace", and the "scales of justice". The reverse displays the national coat of arms and the words "Distinguished Service" and "Voortreflike Diens".

The ribbon is white, edged in green and red (left) and orange and blue (right). In its original form, the decoration was worn on the chest. In its post-1979 form, it was worn around the neck, and on ceremonial occasions it was worn on a silver-gilt collar instead of the ribbon.

The SOO was discontinued on 1 September 1986. After that date, police generals were awarded the Order of the Star of South Africa (Non-Military) instead.

== See also ==
- South African civil honours
- South African police decorations
