= South African Police Star for Outstanding Service =

SA Police Star for Outstanding Service
- Ribbon: 36mm, yellow, with green edges and a white-blue-white panel near each edge.
- Type: Decoration
- Awarded for: Particular gallantry (until 1979) or outstanding service.
- Country: Republic of South Africa
- Presented by: South African Police
- Eligibility: All ranks.
- Post-nominals: SOE
- Status: Discontinued 2004

The South African Police Star for Outstanding Service was a decoration that existed between 1979 and 2004. Recipients are entitled to the post-nominal letters SOE, standing for Stella Officii Egregii, the Latin form of the name.

Instituted on 1 May 1979, the SOE took over the dual role previously played by the SA Police Star for Distinguished Service, and was awarded for particular gallantry, or for outstanding service, resourcefulness, leadership, or sense of responsibility and personal example. It was discontinued as a gallantry decoration when the SA Police Cross for Bravery was expanded to three classes in 1989, but continued to be granted for outstanding service until it was superseded by the SA Police Service Gold Medal for Outstanding Service on 4 May 2004.

The SOE is a silver-gilt cross, the arms made up of multiple rays, with pointed rays between the arms. In the centre is a stylised aloe plant. The reverse displays the national coat of arms and the words Stella Officii Egregii. Its ribbon is yellow, with green edges and a white-blue-white panel near each edge.

== See also ==
- South African civil honours
- South African police decorations
