= Honoris Crux (1975) =

Former South African military decoration

- Type: Military decoration for bravery
- Awarded for: Bravery in dangerous circumstances
- Country: South Africa
- Presented by: the State President and, from 1994, the President
- Eligibility: All Ranks
- Post-nominals: HC
- Campaign: 1966-1989 Border War
- Status: Discontinued in 2003
- Established: 1975
- First award: 1976
- Final award: 2003

Highlights
- Total: 201
- Ribbon bar

SADF pre-1994 & SANDF post-2002 orders of wear
- Next (higher): SADF precedence: Van Riebeeck Decoration; SANDF precedence: Van Riebeeck Decoration
- Next (lower): SADF succession: Pro Virtute Decoration; SANDF succession: Gallantry Cross, Silver

The Honoris Crux (Cross of Honour) of 1975, post-nominal letters HC, is a military decoration for bravery which was instituted by the Republic of South Africa on 1 July 1975. The decoration was awarded to members of the South African Defence Force for bravery in dangerous circumstances. It was the junior in a set of four Honoris Crux decorations in four classes, which together replaced the discontinued Honoris Crux of 1952.

== The South African military ==
The Union Defence Forces (UDF) were established in 1912 and renamed the South African Defence Force (SADF) in 1958. On 27 April 1994, it was integrated with six other independent forces into the South African National Defence Force (SANDF).

== Institution ==
The Honoris Crux (Cross of Honour) of 1975, post-nominal letters HC, was instituted by the State President on 1 July 1975.

== Award criteria ==
The decoration was awarded for bravery in dangerous circumstances. It was the junior of four classes of Honoris Crux decorations, the Honoris Crux Diamond, Honoris Crux Gold, Honoris Crux Silver and Honoris Crux, which together replaced the discontinued Honoris Crux of 1952.

Altogether 201 Honoris Crux decorations were awarded between 1976 and 2004. Most of the awards were won in action, but some were awarded for bravery in non-combat situations. After the institution of the Army Cross, Air Force Cross, Navy Cross and Medical Service Cross in 1987, the award criteria were amended in 1993 to restrict awarding of the Honoris Crux to deeds of bravery in action, while in mortal danger facing the enemy.

The South African military units which were awarded the most Honoris Crux decorations are the Special Forces of the South African Reconnaissance Commandos, whose operators were awarded a total of forty-six Honoris Crux Decorations during the 1966-1989 Border War, in three of the four classes.

== Order of wear ==
The position of the Honoris Crux of 1975 in the official order of precedence was revised twice after 1975, to accommodate the inclusion or institution of new decorations and medals, upon the integration into the South African National Defence Force in 1994 and again upon the institution of a new set of awards in 2003.

South African Defence Force until 26 April 1994

- Official SADF order of precedence:
  - Preceded by the Van Riebeeck Decoration (DVR).
  - Succeeded by the Pro Virtute Decoration (PVD).
- Official national order of precedence:
  - Preceded by the King's/Queen's Police Medal for Gallantry or Distinguished Service (KPM/QPM).
  - Succeeded by the Correctional Services Cross for Valour, Ruby (CPF).

South African National Defence Force from 27 April 1994

- Official SANDF order of precedence:
  - Preceded by the Van Riebeeck Decoration (DVR) of the Republic of South Africa.
  - Succeeded by the Gallantry Cross, Silver of the Republic of Venda.
- Official national order of precedence:
  - Preceded by the King's/Queen's Police Medal for Gallantry or Distinguished Service (KPM/QPM) of the United Kingdom.
  - Succeeded by the Correctional Services Cross for Valour, Ruby (CPF) of the Republic of South Africa.

The position of the Honoris Crux of 1975 in the order of precedence remained unchanged, as it was on 27 April 1994, when a new series of military orders, decorations and medals was instituted on 27 April 2003.

== Description ==
Obverse

The Honoris Crux of 1975 is a silver Maltese cross, which fits in a 45 millimetres diameter circle, with two swords in saltire surmounted by a circular protea wreath, the arms of the cross in white enamel, with a roundel in the centre, tierced horizontally in the orange, white and blue bands of the national flag, framed in a double silver circle containing 24 stones.

Reverse

The reverse has the pre-1994 South African Coat of Arms, with the decoration number impressed underneath.

Ribbon

The ribbon is 32 millimetres wide, with a 2½ millimetres wide white band, a 3 millimetres wide orange band and a 1 millimetre wide white band, repeated in reverse order and separated by a 19 millimetres wide orange band.

== Discontinuation ==
Conferment of the decoration was discontinued in respect of services performed on or after 27 April 2003, when the Honoris Crux of 1975 was replaced by the new Nkwe ya Selefera (NS).

== Recipients ==
Name	Rank	Year awarded	HC no.	Date of action	Unit	Corps	Service Arm
Holtzhausen, L.J.	Maj	1976	001	5 Oct 1975	Inf School	SAIC	SA Army
Holm, Johan Wolfgang †	Capt	1976	002	23 Nov 1975	DTCS	SAIC	SA Army
Potgieter, Johannes Hendrik	Capt	1976	003	4 Jan 1976	4 FR	SAAC	SA Army
Van Wyk, J.C.	Lt	1976	004	18 Oct 1975	1 RR	SAIC	SA Army
Aucamp, Pieter Joshua	2 Lt	1976	005	11 Nov 1975	11 Comdo	SAIC	SA Army
Blaauw, Johan	2 Lt	1976	006	17 Dec 1975	1 PB	SAIC	SA Army
Fountain, Ted Stewart	2 Lt	1976	007	10 Dec 1975	2 FER	SAEC	SA Army
Nicolau, Alexander	2 Lt	1976	008	24 Nov 1975	1 SSB	SAAC	SA Army
Prins, Michael John	2 Lt	1976	009	21 Dec 1975	14 FR	SAAC	SA Army
Steyn, Daniel	2 Lt	1976	010	20 Dec 1975	2 FR	SAAC	SA Army
Van Vuuren, L.M.J.	2 Lt	1976	011	12 Dec 1975	1 SSB	SAAC	SA Army
Venter, P.M.	2 Lt	1976	012	12 Jan 1976	1 SSB	SAAC	SA Army
Burger, Joseph Johannes	WO2	1976	013	1 Jun 1976	2 SAI	SAIC	SA Army
Conradie, Johannes Lambertus VRM	WO2	1976	014	7 Dec 1975	1 RR	SAIC	SA Army
Lubbe, P.S.	WO2	1976	015	11 Nov 1975	2 FR	SAAC	SA Army
Paulo, D. (Danny Roxo)	S Sgt	1976	016	1 Nov 1975	1 RR	SAIC	SA Army
Steenkamp, J.H.	S Sgt	1976	017	23 Nov 1975	4 SAI	SAIC	SA Army
Diedericks, André ♥	Cpl	1976	018	2 Dec 1975	1 RR	SAIC	SA Army
Rosenstrauch, E.J.	Cpl	1976	019	25 Jan 1976	WP Comd	SATSC	SA Army
Kussendrager, J.L. ♦	Pte	1976	020	25 Jan 1976	WP Comd	SATSC	SA Army
Janse van Rensburg, Stephanus Petrus ♦	Tpr	1976	021	24 Nov 1975	1 SSB	SAAC	SA Army
Atkinson, David Frank	Lt	1976	022	1 Aug 1976	16 Sqn	SAAF	SAAF
Milbank, C.C.	Lt	1976	023	12 Feb 1976	16 Sqn	SAAF	SAAF
Troup, Trevor Owen	Lt	1976	024	1 Sep 1976	17 Sqn	SAAF	SAAF
Winterbottom, Kevin Roy †♦	2 Lt	1976	025	9 Jul 1976	4 Sqn	SAAF	SAAF
O'Neil, Pieter du Toit	F Sgt	1976	026	21 Dec 1975	19 Sqn	SAAF	SAAF
Becker, L. (Boertjie)	Sgt	1976	027	1 Sep 1976	87 HFS	SAAF	SAAF
Kriel, Gabriel Gerhardus	Sgt	1976	028	1 Jun 1976	17 Sqn	SAAF	SAAF
Not awarded, museum exhibit			029				
Hougaard, Johannes Jacobus ♦	2 Lt	1978	030	9 Dec 1976	3 SAI	SAIC	SA Army
Mostert, Daniel Nicolaas Johannes ♦	2 Lt	1978	031	9 Dec 1976	3 SAI	SAIC	SA Army
Viljoen, M.	Sgt	1978	032	28 Oct 1977	1 RR	SAIC	SA Army
Douglas, R.A.	Lt	1978	033	16 May 1977	CTH	SAIC	SA Army
Kruger, D.A.	Lt	1978	034	16 May 1976	RLW	SAIC	SA Army
Van Schalkwyk, Josias Johannes ♦	2 Lt	1978	035	9 Dec 1976	3 SAI	SAIC	SA Army
Gildenhuys, W.H.B. †♦	Sgt	1978	036	25 May 1977}	CTH	SAIC	SA Army
Van Aswegen, H.W.	Sgt	1978	037	22 Apr 1976	RCB	SAIC	SA Army
Wasserman, J.A.vR.	Cpl	1978	038	16 May 1976	RLW	SAIC	SA Army
De Kock, A.D.	Rfn	1978	039	16 May 1976	RLW	SAIC	SA Army
Oberholzer, S.E.H.	Rfn	1978	040	16 May 1976	RLW	SAIC	SA Army
Van der Merwe, J.J.	Rfn	1978	041	4 May 1978	2 PB	SAIC	SA Army
Van der Zee, L.F.	Rfn	1978	042	22 Apr 1976	RCB	SAIC	SA Army
Van Vuuren, J.W.	Rfn	1978	043	16 May 1976	RLW	SAIC	SA Army
Kanes, R.G.	Cpl	1978	044	4 May 1978	2 SAI	SAIC	SA Army
Saunders, M. ♦	Tpr	1978	045	13 Sep 1976	PAG	SAIC	SA Army
Wiggill, Peter Noel †	Cpl	1978	046	15 Dec 1976	Algoa	SATSC	SA Army
Church, John	Maj	1978	047	4 May 1978	19 Sqn	SAAF	SAAF
Marais, A.L. (Dries)	Capt	1978	048	4 May 1978	24 Sqn	SAAF	SAAF
Klopper, L.J.	Sgt	1978	049	2 Jan 1975	1 RR	SAIC	SA Army
Fourie, D.H.	Lt	1979	050	6 Sep 1978	4 RR	SAIC	SA Army
Engelbrecht. D.P.	Cpl	1979	051	4 May 1978	3 PB	SAIC	SA Army
Delport, J.C.	Rfn	1979	052	13 Sep 1978	RDP	SAIC	SA Army
Packham, D.E.	Rfn	1979	053	4 May 1978	3 PB	SAIC	SA Army
Grinaker, O. (Ola)	Lt	1979	054	7 Sep 1978	17 Sqn	SAAF	SAAF
Mouton, A.A. (Riem)	Lt	1979	055	9 Sep 1978	24 Sqn	SAAF	SAAF
Jooste, Johannes Cornelius †♦	Pte	1979	056	28 Oct 1978		SAMS	SAMS
Smith, Frederik Johannes †♦	Pte	1979	057	28 Oct 1978		SAMS	SAMS
Van Papendorp, Burgert van Dyk †♦	Pte	1979	058	28 Oct 1978		SAMS	SAMS
Koen, P.G.L. ♦	Maj	1979	059	25 Jan 1979		SAOSC	SA Army
Du Toit, J.J. †	Lt	1980	060	1 Jun 1980	1 SAI	SAIC	SA Army
Parkin, J.G.	2 Lt	1980	061	18 Oct 1979	1 PB	SAIC	SA Army
Greyling, C.P.	Sgt	1980	062	28 Oct 1977	1 RR	SAIC	SA Army
Christie, Gavin M. (Note: Cpl's Christie, Gavin M. & Potgieter, J.J. for their actions during Operation Boxer)	Cpl	1980	063	1 Sep 1979	4 RR	SAIC	SA Army
Potgieter, J.J.	Cpl	1980	064	1 Sep 1979	4 RR	SAIC	SA Army
Conga, J. †	Rfn	1980	065	12 Sep 1979	31 Bn	SAIC	SA Army
Rice, K.B.	Cpl	1980	066	13 Apr 1976	5 SAI	SAIC	SA Army
Rutherford, G.T.	L Cpl	1980	067	10 Jun 1980	5 SAI	SAIC	SA Army
De Kock, P.P.	Rfn	1980	068	29 Jun 1980	1 PB	SAIC	SA Army
De Lange, A.S.	Rfn	1980	069	18 Oct 1979	1 PB	SAIC	SA Army
Gibson, B.J.	Rfn	1980	070	18 Oct 1979	1 PB	SAIC	SA Army
Mare, B.	Rfn	1980	071	18 Oct 1979	1 PB	SAIC	SA Army
McNamara, C.N.	Rfn	1980	072	18 Oct 1979	1 PB	SAIC	SA Army
Southey, L.B.	Rfn	1980	073	18 Oct 1979	1 PB	SAIC	SA Army
Kruger, P.E. (Polla)	Maj	1980	074	18 Oct 1979	19 Sqn	SAAF	SAAF
Stannard, P.J. (Crow)	Maj	1980	075	1 Sep 1979	19 Sqn	SAAF	SAAF
Hoebel, S. (Sieg)	F Sgt	1980	076	18 Oct 1979	19 Sqn	SAAF	SAAF
Viljoen, E.G.	Maj	1981	077	1 Feb 1978	32 Bn	SAIC	SA Army
Keulder, H.	Capt	1981	078	2 Dec 1979	3 SAI	SAIC	SA Army
Johnston, Andrew Lawrence (Note: Johnston, Andrew Lawrence and Smith, Michael Anthony: During a special forces operation, conducted at night in an urban area, a hand grenade exploded, seriously wounding a four man team. Staff Sergeant Johnstone, Corporal Smith and another team member from a different team came to the assistance of the four wounded operators of the first team. The explosion had caused a fire which then ignited further grenades, carried in the webbing of the injured. Johnstone, Smith and their colleague remained with the wounded and returned enemy fire, allowing the wounded to be extracted and ensuring the eventual success of the mission.)	S Sgt	1981	079	28 Jan 1981	1 RR	SAIC	SA Army
Terblanche, J.C.G.	Sgt	1981	080	25 Jun 1980	5 RR	SAIC	SA Army
Smith, Michael Anthony	Cpl	1981	081	28 Jan 1981	1 RR	SAIC	SA Army
Du Plessis, I.C.	Capt	1981	082	7 Jun 1980	85 CFS	SAAF	SAAF
Bouwer, J.S. ♦	Lt	1981	083	4 May 1981		SAMS	SAMS
Whiteman, J.A.	Cpl	1982	084	23 Aug 1981	201 Bn	SAIC	SA Army
Burgers, G.D.	L Cpl	1982	085	26 Aug 1981	1 SAI	SAIC	SA Army
Van der Westhuizen, R.	2 Lt	1982	086	14 Apr 1981	Etosha	SAIC	SA Army
Joao, E.	Cpl	1982	087	29 Nov 1979	32 Bn	SAIC	SA Army
Owen, David Douglas (Stoof)	Capt	1982	088	5 Jul 1981	17 Sqn	SAAF	SAAF
Hattingh, A.A. (André)	Capt	1982	089	5 Jul 1981	17 Sqn	SAAF	SAAF
Laubscher, D.J. (Danie)	Capt	1982	090	24 Aug 1981	42 Sqn	SAAF	SAAF
Anderson, L.A.	Maj	1982	091	5 Nov 1981	101 Bn	SAIC	SA Army
Fourie, F.E.	Lt	1982	092	1 Jan 1981	1 RR	SAIC	SA Army
Greeff, J.deV. (Jack) (Note: This is an error. There was a mixup with General Order 120/82 where his name was listed with the HC recipients where he had clearly been awarded the HCS)	S Sgt	1982	093	1 Jan 1981	1 RR	SAIC	SA Army
Fourie, J.G.J.	Cpl	1982	094	1 Jan 1981	1 RR	SAIC	SA Army
De Nobrega, A.	Cpl	1982	095	10 Sep 1981	SWAMS	SAIC	SA Army
Kloppers, J.S.	Cpl	1982	096	1 Jan 1981	1 RR	SAIC	SA Army
Helm, A.J.H.	CO	1982	097	28 Aug 1981	2 SSB	SAAC	SA Army
Grové, J.J.	2 Lt	1982	098	25 Aug 1981	2 SSB	SAAC	SA Army
Bovy, S.J.Y. (Serge)	Lt	1982	099	29 Dec 1981	17 Sqn	SAAF	SAAF
Berry, R.M. ♦	AB	1982	100	4 May 1981	SAS PK	SAN	SAN
Warren, S.B. ♦	Sea	1982	101	4 May 1981	SAS PK	SAN	SAN
Breytenbach, Cornelius Noël HCS	Col	c. 1982			SAAF	SAAF	SAAF
Anderson, H.F.	Capt	1983		2 Aug 1982	AFB Oa	SAAF	SAAF
Ellis, Neall (Nellis)	Maj	1983		13 Mar 1982	AFB Oa	SAAF	SAAF
Hill, M.A.	Capt	1983		9 Aug 1982	AFB Oa	SAAF	SAAF
Nel, P.J.S. †	2 Lt	1983		13 Mar 1982	32 Bn	SAIC	SA Army
Steyn, S.S.	2 Lt	1983		30 Jul 1982	SAAC	SAAC	SA Army
Coetzee, S.	Sgt	1983		13 Mar 1982	AFB Oa	SAAF	SAAF
Dracula, V.	Sgt	1983	109	13 Mar 1982	32 Bn	SAIC	SA Army
Domingos, B.	Rfn	1983	110	13 Mar 1982	32 Bn	SAIC	SA Army
De Villiers, C.M. ♦	Maj	1983		4 Feb 1983		SAMS	SAMS
Radmore, D.W.J. ♦	Col	1983		17 Aug 1982	SWATFHQ	SASC	SA Army
Alberts, C.F.W. (Carl)	Capt	1984		4 Jan 1984	AFB Oa	SAAF	SAAF
Macaskill, A.	2 Lt	1984		4 Jan 1984		SAIC	SA Army
Le Roux, H.C.	2 Lt	1984		22 Mar 1983	61 Mech	SAIC	SA Army
Wright, T.	S Sgt	1984		11 Feb 1983	TSR	SAIC	SA Army
Callow, Tim J.	Capt	1986		1 Jan 1985	SFHQ	SAIC	SA Army
Matias, N.T.	Sgt	1986		1 Jun 1985	SFHQ	SAIC	SA Army
Dobe, P.	Sgt	1986		1 Jan 1985	SFHQ	SAIC	SA Army
Clarke, C.T.D.	Cpl	1986		24 May 1984	DLI	SAIC	SA Army
Halgryn, Ronnie	Rfn	1986		31 Dec 1983	RGK	SAIC	SA Army
Lochner, Johannes Willem	Rfn	1986		31 Dec 1983	RGK	SAIC	SA Army
Schoombe, A.	Rfn	1986		24 Jun 1984	101 Bn	SAIC	SA Army
Fritsch, R.	Pte	1986		12 Jun 1983	5 Med	SAMS	SAMS
Jacobs, J.L.	Pte	1986		12 Jun 1983	5 Med	SAMS	SAMS
Maree, D.H. ♦	WO2	1986		7 Feb 1985		SAOSC	SA Army
Philipson, Leon	Lt	1986		14 Sep 1985	14 FR	SAAC	SA Army
Queiroz, A.M.R. (Note: Queiroz, A.M.R.: Awarded for his actions during Operation Argon)	S Sgt	1986		1 May 1985	4 RR	SAIC	SA Army
Vorster, C. ♦	F Sgt	1986		20 May 1985	AFB Swkp	SAAF	SAAF
Coetzee, Theuns J.	Maj	1986	134	14 Sep 1985	Artillery Sc	SAAC	SA Army
Barnes, L.E. ♦	Sgt	1986	135	20 May 1985	AFHQ	SAAF	SAAF
Scobbie, J. ♦	Amn	1986		20 May 1985	AFB Swkp	SAAF	SAAF
Whyte, A. ♦	LS	1986		18 Aug 1982	SAS PK	SAN	SAN
Fisher, Matthew Joseph	Pte	1986	138	31 Dec 1983	5 Med	SAMS	SAMS
Winn, Kenneth John	Pte	1986		31 Dec 1983	5 Med	SAMS	SAMS
Van Zyl, G.P. ♦	Bdr	1987		25 Sep 1985		SAAC	SA Army
Roux, A.L.	L/Cpl			28 Jan 1987		SAMS	SAMS
Van Zyl, H.G.	Lt	1987				SAMS	SAMS
Vermaak, J.	S Sgt	1988		20 Sep 1987	1 RR	SAIC	SA Army
Steynberg, F.J.	L Cpl	1988		13 Mar 1987		SAMS	SAMS
Wilke, Coenraad Frederick	Maj	1988		25 Aug 1987	4 RR	SAIC	SA Army
Beukman, Anton	S Sgt	1988		25 Aug 1987	4 RR	SAIC	SA Army
Heydendrych, Gerhardus Johannes	S Sgt	1988		25 Aug 1987	4 RR	SAIC	SA Army
Burt, Richard Brent	Sgt	1988		25 Aug 1987	4 RR	SAIC	SA Army
De Wet, Jacobus	Sgt	1988		25 Aug 1987	4 RR	SAIC	SA Army
Herbst, Philippus Jacobus	Sgt	1988		25 Aug 1987	4 RR	SAIC	SA Army
Liebenberg, Henk	Sgt	1988		25 Aug 1987	4 RR	SAIC	SA Army
Manuel, Adriano Nelson	Sgt	1988		25 Aug 1987	4 RR	SAIC	SA Army
Oettle, Johannes Lochner	Sgt	1988		25 Aug 1987	4 RR	SAIC	SA Army
Van der Merwe, Johannes Hendrik	Sgt	1988		25 Aug 1987	4 RR	SAIC	SA Army
Van Niekerk, Pieter Gideon	Cpl	1988		25 Aug 1987	4 RR	SAIC	SA Army
Wessels, Leslie Petrus	Sgt	1988		25 Aug 1987	4 RR	SAIC	SA Army
Pyper, D.F.	Capt	1988		23 Mar 1988	RPS	SAAC	SA Army
Bock, David A.C.	2 Lt	1988	157	31 Oct 1987	101 Bn	SAIC	SA Army
Lehman, J. (Johan)	Cmdt	1988		5 Oct 1987		SAMI	SAAF
Van Dyk, P.R. (Flip)	Sgt	1988		1 Oct 1987	24 Sqn	SAAF	SAAF
Nortman, J.H.	Cmdt	1988		13 Sep 1987	32 Bn	SAIC	SA Army
Bremer, H.M.	2 Lt	1988	170	16 Sep 1987	61 Mech	SAAC	SA Army
Kooij, J.	2 Lt	1988		13 Sep 1987	61 Mech	SAIC	SA Army
Rupping, R.	Sgt	1988		13 Sep 1987	32 Bn	SAIC	SA Army
Green, G.W.	Rfn	1988		3 Oct 1987	61 Mech	SAIC	SA Army
Gregory, A.T. ♦	Rfn	1991		28 Jan 1987	Insele	SAIC	SA Army
Bronkhorst, J.J.	Cpl	1988		31 Oct 1987	101 Bn	SAIC	SA Army
Cronje, D.L.	Cpl	1988	114	31 Oct 1987	Sec 10	Command	SA Army
Frederick, F.	Cpl			31 Oct 1987	101 Bn	SAIC	SA Army
Prinsloo, N.J.A.	Lt	1988		31 Oct 1987	101 Bn	SAIC	SA Army
Stander, T.	Cpl	1988		31 Oct 1987	101 Bn	SAIC	SA Army
Theunissen, J.	Cpl	1988		31 Oct 1987	101 Bn	SAIC	SA Army
Thom, A.M. †	Rfn	1991		9 Nov 1987	4 SAI	SAIC	SA Army
De Vos, T.J.D.	Lt	1988		11 Nov 1987	32 Bn	SAIC	SA Army
Labuschagne, J.H.	Sgt			11 Nov 1987	4 SAI	SATSC	SA Army
Van Zyl, P.J.	Capt	1988		11 Nov 1987	2 SAI	SAIC	SA Army
Parsons, S. F.	Corporal	1988		22 Mar 1988	6 MU	SAOSC	SA Army
Louw, G.M.	Cmdt	1988		23 Mar 1988	ACTS	SAAC	SA Army
Dreyer, Willem Adriaan	Lt	1988		2 May 1988	102 Bn	SAIC	SA Army
Nel, Stephanus Gerhardus Johannes	Capt	1988		2 May 1988	102 Bn	SAIC	SA Army
McCarthy, Alan John	Maj	1990		2 Apr 1989	16 Sqn	SAAF	SAAF
Eksteen, A.	Capt	1990		3 Apr 1989	31 Sqn	SAAF	SAAF
Vergottini, Mario	Capt	1990		2 Apr 1989	17 Sqn	SAAF	SAAF
De Roubaix, Emmanuel Marthinus	Sgt	1990		2 Apr 1989	17 Sqn	SAAF	SAAF
Fourie, G.	Sgt	1990		3 Apr 1989	87 HFS	SAAF	SAAF
Steyn, E.E.	F Sgt	1990		2 Apr 1989	17 Sqn	SAAF	SAAF
Thomas, J.A. †	Lt	1991		29 Feb 1988	701 Bn	SAIC	SA Army
Hulley, C.C.	2 Lt	1991		9 Sep 1990	Hoëveld	SAIC	SA Army
Lewis, M.J. ♦	WO1	1991		12 Sep 1990	82 Mech	SAIC	SA Army
Du Plessis, R. ♦	S Sgt	1991		12 Sep 1990	82 Mech	SAIC	SA Army
Maloy, J.A. ♦	Rfn	1991		30 Jan 1990	1 SACC	SAIC	SA Army
Rosenberg, E.D. †♦	Rfn	1991		30 Jan 1990	1 SACC	SAIC	SA Army
Geldenhuys, A. ♦	Lt Cdr	1991		4 Aug 1991	Diving Sch	SAN	SAN
Mostert, F.H. ♦	CPO	1991		4 Aug 1991	Diving Sch	SAN	SAN
Brown, D.M. ♦	LS	1991		4 Aug 1991	Diving Sch	SAN	SAN
Dicks, L.J. ♦	LS	1991		4 Aug 1991	Diving Sch	SAN	SAN
Merts, P.J.	Cmdt	1992		19 Jul 1980	31 Sqn	SAAF	SAAF
Reesch, N.	2 Lt	1992		1980		SAIC	SA Army
Francis, C.T.	S Sgt	1992		1989			SA Army
Joubert, J.	F Sgt	1992		1984		SAAF	SAAF
Fidler, Bruce Andrew. † (Note: Fidler, Bruce Andrew. – In the early 1980s, the South African Reconnaissance Commandos (now the South African Special Forces Brigade) identified the need for a special medical unit to support Special Forces on operations and the Detachment Medical Special Operations was formed. Under command of the Surgeon General, a group of 9 doctors with Commandant Wouter Basson at the head, founded what would later become 7 Medical Battalion Group at Special Forces Brigade Headquarters (Speskop) south of Pretoria in 1984. Corporal Bruce Andrew Fidler, an operational medical support operator of 7 Med Bn Gp with Special Forces training, was killed in action in Angola on 15 September 1985. The details are sketchy, but it is understood that Corporal Fidler supported a clandestine unit of the SADF, most probably 1 Parachute Battalion, tasked to train UNITA. Corporal Fidler was attached to 44 Parachute Regiment during operations in Southern Angola, in support of UNITA. His unit was ambushed and in the ensuing firefight, he was captured by enemy forces and was reported missing. Fidler was brutally tortured and interrogated by the enemy before being executed, but he never revealed the presence of his nearby unit, thereby enabling the 7 Medical Battalion Group Surgical Team of between 5 and 10 doctors to successfully evade capture and reach South African lines. His remains were repatriated to South Africa in June 1992 and he was cremated on 15 September 1992. Corporal Fidler was posthumously awarded the Honoris Crux for his bravery and selfless devotion, above and beyond the call of duty in the face of brutal torture. He was 22.)	Cpl	1992		15 Sep 1985	7 Med	SAMS	SAMS
Alexander, Simon ♦	Cpl	1994	164	26 May 1993	Natal Medical Command	SAMS	SAMS
De Villiers, J.	Cpl	1995				SAMS	SAMS
Meulenbeck, F.A. †	Rfn	1995				SAIC	SA Army
Fonette, Manuel	Rfn					SAIC	SA Army
Sterzel, Stuart ♥	Sgt			1987		SAIC	SA Army

Note 1: † denotes a posthumous award.
Note 2: ♦ denotes a non-combat or non-operational act of bravery.
Note 3: ♥ André Diedericks was also awarded the HCS in 1985.
Note 4: ♥ Sterzel, Stuart was the last recipient of the Honoris Crux Series in 2004.
