= Honoris Crux Silver =

- Type: Military decoration for bravery
- Awarded for: Exceptional bravery in great danger
- Country: South Africa
- Presented by: the State President and, from 1994, the President
- Eligibility: All Ranks
- Post-nominals: HCS
- Campaign: 1966-1989 Border War
- Status: Discontinued in 2003
- Established: 1975
- First award: 1976
- Final award: 1992

Highlights
- Total: 27
- Ribbon bar

SADF pre-1994 & SANDF post-2002 orders of wear
- Next (higher): SADF precedence: Honoris Crux (1952); SANDF precedence: Honoris Crux (1952)
- Next (lower): SADF succession: Van Riebeeck Decoration; SANDF succession: Van Riebeeck Decoration

The Honoris Crux Silver (Silver Cross of Honour), post-nominal letters HCS, is a military decoration for bravery which was instituted by the Republic of South Africa on 1 July 1975. It was awarded to members of the South African Defence Force for exceptional acts of bravery while in great danger. The Honoris Crux Silver was the third most senior in a set of four classes of Honoris Crux decorations, which together replaced the discontinued Honoris Crux of 1952.

== The South African military ==
The Union Defence Forces (UDF) were established in 1912 and renamed the South African Defence Force (SADF) in 1958. On 27 April 1994, it was integrated with six other independent forces into the South African National Defence Force (SANDF).

== Institution ==
The Honoris Crux Silver (Silver Cross of Honour), post-nominal letters HCS, was instituted by the State President on 1 July 1975.

== Award criteria ==
The decoration was awarded to members of the South African Defence Force for exceptional acts of bravery in action, while in great danger. A Bar could be awarded for a further similar deed of bravery. It was the third most senior of a set of four classes of Honoris Crux decorations, the Honoris Crux Diamond, Honoris Crux Gold, Honoris Crux Silver and Honoris Crux, which replaced the discontinued Honoris Crux of 1952.

== Order of wear ==
The position of the Honoris Crux Silver in the official order of precedence was revised twice after 1975, to accommodate the inclusion or institution of new decorations and medals, first with the integration into the South African National Defence Force in 1994 and again with the institution of a new set of awards in 2003, but it remained unchanged on both occasions.

Official SANDF order of precedence

- Preceded by the Honoris Crux (1952) (HC) of the Republic of South Africa.
- Succeeded by the Van Riebeeck Decoration (DVR) of the Republic of South Africa.

Official national order of precedence

- Preceded by the Honoris Crux (1952) (HC) of the Republic of South Africa.
- Succeeded by the Van Riebeeck Decoration (DVR) of the Republic of South Africa.

== Description ==
Obverse

The Honoris Crux Silver is a silver Maltese cross which fits in a circle 45 millimetres in diameter, with two swords in saltire surmounted by a circular protea wreath, the arms of the cross in green enamel, with a roundel in the centre, tierced horizontally in the orange, white and blue bands of the national flag, framed in a double silver circle containing 24 stones. It is identical to the Honoris Crux of 1975 in all respects, except the colour of the enamel on the arms of the cross.

Reverse

The reverse has the pre-1994 South African Coat of Arms, with the decoration number impressed above and the silver hallmark below.

Bar

The bar is of silver, with a miniature replica of the Maltese cross embossed in the centre.

Ribbon

The ribbon is 32 millimetres wide and orange, with two 1 millimetre wide white bands in the centre, spaced 4 millimetres apart.

== Discontinuation ==
Conferment of the decoration was discontinued in respect of services performed on or after 27 April 2003, when the Honoris Crux Silver was replaced by the new Nkwe ya Selefera (NS).

== Recipients ==
In respect of those recipients about whom it is available, the actions they were cited for follow below the table.

Name	Rank	HCS no.	Date of action	Unit	Service Arm
Swanepoel, Pieter Arnoldus	Cpl	005	11 Nov 1975	2 SAI BN	SA Army
Van Niekerk, Hermanus	2 Lt	001	23 Nov 1975	14 Fd Rgt	SA Army
Wannenburg, Frederick Gerhardus †	2 Lt	003	7 Dec 1975	1 Recce Rgt	SA Army
Piccione, Kevin Bruce	Tpr	006	26 Dec 1975	1 SSB	SA Army
Rawlins, Vincent R.	Cpl	004	3 Jan 1976	3 SAI BN	SA Army
Ward, William James Harold	S Sgt	002	10 Mar 1976	2 Recce Rgt	SA Army
Childs, Perry James	Lt	007	27 Mar 1976	17 Sqn	SAAF
Meerholz, Cornelius Alwyn Johannes	Capt	009	28 Oct 1977	1 Recce Rgt	SA Army
Hogan, Leo Anthony	Rfn	008	9 Nov 1977	3 Para Bn	SA Army
Costa, Feliciano (Note: Costa, Feliciano: Awarded for action with enemy insurgents 16 km north of the Angolan border, during a succession of interlinked firefights, where Rifleman Costa repeatedly attacked and killed enemy insurgents using grenades after his RPD had been damaged by enemy fire. He was the first member of the SADF to be presented with the HCS at a medal parade in the operational area. "The patrol commenced on the late afternoon of Sunday 22 April 1979. Just before sundown we made brief contact, about 5 km north of the cutline, with a small SWAPO group infiltrating into SWA. The series of ongoing contacts for which Feliciano received his Honoris Crux, took place the following day, Monday 23 April. The contact commenced at approximately first light and continued throughout the day until SAAF Impalas were able to 'bomb' a safe zone, which allowed the Puma Choppers to land and uplift us. To this day the body of our fallen Brother in Arms, Rfn Alfredo Tichondo, remains behind in Angola in an unmarked grave. May His Soul Forevermore RIP. This skirmish marked the first contact of the then fledgling 32Bn Recce Grp.")	Rfn	010	23 Apr 1979	32 Bn	SA Army
Breytenbach, Cornelius Noël	Cmdt	011	1 Sep 1979	19 Sqn	SAAF
Stannard, Richard John (Note: Stannard, Richard John: During a special forces operation conducted at night in an urban area, a hand grenade exploded, seriously wounding a four-man team. Stannard and his two team members came to the assistance of the four wounded operators from the first team. The explosion had caused a fire which then ignited further grenades, carried in the webbing of the injured. Stannard and his team remained with the wounded and returned enemy fire, allowing the wounded to be extracted and ensuring the eventual success of the mission. Stannard was awarded the HCS, while the two members of his team, Staff Sergeant A.L. Johnston and Corporal M.A. Smith, who assisted in the rescue, were awarded the HC.)	Lt	012	28 Jan 1981	1 Recce Rgt	SA Army
Lewer, Richard Campbell McNeillie (Note: Lewer, Richard Campbell McNeillie (Dick): Awarded for close air support to an ambushed 31 Battalion company, close to Xangongo, which was deployed as a stopper group for the opening of Operation Protea. Major Lewer repeatedly attacked a large force of SWAPO/FAPLA elements who had pinned down the SADF company. Operating alone and at night in his single-seat Impala Mk II, his continued attacks allowed the company to withdraw to safety.)	Maj	019	23 Aug 1981	8 Sqn	SAAF
Botes, Christo Wilhelm (Note: Botes, Christo Wilhelm: Sergeant Botes was the flight engineer on the second helicopter mission for which Capt Arthur Walker HCG and Bar SM was decorated. He was awarded the HCS for his life-threatening actions when they landed their helicopter whilst under intense enemy fire, to rescue the crew of a downed Alouette III helicopter, Lieutenant Serge Bovy and Sergeant Dolf van Rensburg.)	Sgt	015	29 Dec 1981	AFB Ondangwa	SAAF
Barnes, Leslie Edward (Note: Barnes, Leslie Edward: Awarded for his actions after a bomb explosion at SAAF Headquarters, Pretoria. Sergeant Barnes was in a parked vehicle behind the vehicle which contained the bomb and was severely burned in the explosion. Despite his injuries, Barnes rescued an unconscious colleague from his vehicle and carried her to safety. He then returned to the burning vehicle and rescued a second colleague from the vehicle. Immediately after rescuing the second SAAF officer, the vehicle in which they had been trapped, exploded as its fuel tank ignited.)	Sgt	015	20 May 1983	MRU	SAAF
Bantjes, Alexander Petrus	Cpl	016	19 Mar 1984	MRU	SAAF
Hashomwenda, Dawie	Rfn	017	6 Feb 1985	101 Bn	SA Army
Van Zyl, Hendrik Gideon	Lt	018	11 Feb 1985	Spec Serv HQ	SAMS
Diedericks, André HC	Maj	019	1 Jun 1985	Spec Forces HQ	SA Army
Steyn, Jacobus Frederik	Maj	025	1 Jan 1987	NC Command	SA Army
Roux, Anton Louis	L Cpl	021	28 Feb 1987	10 Med Gp	SAMS
Venter, Johannes Antonie	L Cpl	102	6 Sep 1987	44 Bde Mil Int	SA Army
De Gouveia, J.H. (Johnny)	Sgt	023	20 Sep 1987	1 Recce Rgt	SA Army
Badenhorst, Johannes Jacobus	Spr	024	23 Apr 1988	13 Fd Eng Regt	SA Army
Slade, Alan Mark	Capt	104	1 Apr 1989	22 Sqn	SAAF
Frederikson, Theodore Kurt	Sgt	105	1 Apr 1989	31 Sqn	SAAF
Scoular, Gary Ian (Note: Scoular, Gary Ian: Awarded for his action to search for possibly trapped passengers in the listing and sinking ship MTS Oceanos off the Transkei Wild Coast on 4 August 1991.)	LS	116	4 Aug 1991	SAS Scorpion	SAN
Greeff, J.deV. (Jack) (Note: Major Greeff was clearly awarded the HCS but General Order 120/82 got it wrong, listing his name with HC awardees instead of HCS awardees. This has just (19 May 2023) been corrected with an announcement from the SA Special Forces Association sent to all members along with the supporting documentation. The form DD792 (available in the State Archives) shows that the medal was recommended and endorsed at all levels as an HCS. This is confirmed by Major Greeff's clearing out form. His full group is )	S Sgt	032	1 Jan 1981	1 RR	SA Army

Note 1: † denotes a posthumous award.
