= Neall Ellis =

Rhodesian/South African pilot

Colonel Neall Ellis HC
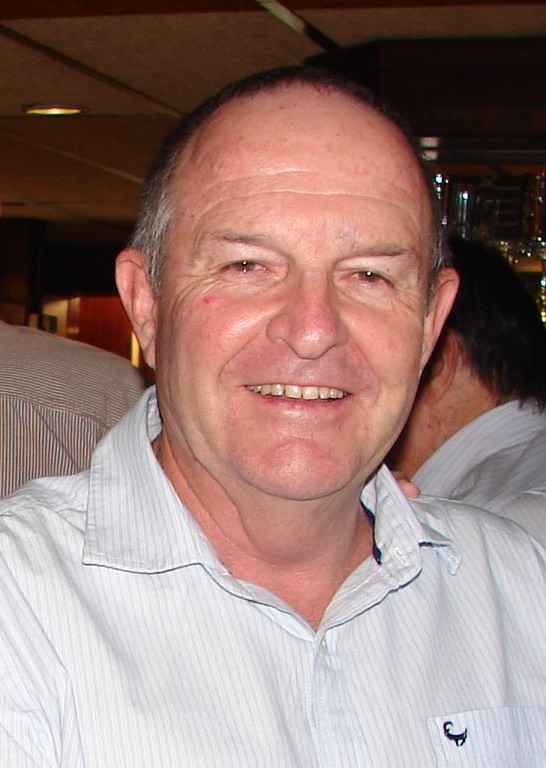
- Born: Neall Ellis; 24 November 1949 (age 76); Johannesburg, South Africa
- Military career
- Allegiance: Rhodesia; South Africa; Executive Outcomes; Sierra Leone
- Branch: Rhodesian Army; South African Air Force
- Service years: ?–1971 (Rhodesia); 1971–1992 (South Africa); 1996–2004 (Sierra Leone)
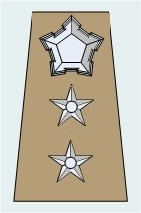
- Rank: Colonel
- Nicknames: Nellis, Gunship Ace
- Wars: Rhodesian Bush War; South African Border War; Angolan Civil War; First Congo War; Sierra Leone Civil War; Yugoslav Wars; Iraq War; War in Afghanistan (2001-2021)
- Awards: Honoris Crux (1975) HC

Neall Ellis HC is a South African military aviator and mercenary. Raised in Bulawayo, he joined the South African Air Force after a brief stint in the Rhodesian Army. As a helicopter pilot he was awarded the Honoris Crux decoration in 1983 for his actions during Operation Super, and later attained field rank. After retiring from the SAAF he contracted for various private military companies, including Executive Outcomes and Sandline International. During the civil war in Sierra Leone, he and his Mi-24 armed attack military helicopter crew held off Revolutionary United Front (RUF) forces almost single-handedly. He also provided fire support for British troops during Operation Barras.

== Freelance career ==
Ellis' private military career under Sandline led him to deployment in Sierra Leone, where he and his crew were hired by the British-backed government to support them in the civil war, providing government forces with air support against the RUF with Mi-17 and later Mi-24 gunships. Ellis' crew were seen as effective from a tactical and a psychological perspective, as their aircraft's presence was often sufficient to cause RUF forces operating in an area to flee.

As the RUF advanced on the capital, Freetown, British military garrison stationed in Sierra Leone were evacuated, leaving the city to be occupied by the rebel faction. Although they were attacking at night, where the air crew had no equipment that would provide night-vision, Ellis issued a plan to fly out and meet them in an effort to drive them off. None of Ellis' crew agreed to the mission, however, prompting him to pilot his gunship in a combat mission against the RUF alone. Although Ellis was able to successfully drive off the RUF forces attacking Freetown on two successive occasions, his gunship suffered a mechanical failure and he was unable to continue flying, allowing the rebels to seize the city.

Ellis and his crew continued to operate against the RUF, although due to the loss of the capital the government were unable to pay them. Anecdotally, when their ammo supplies were expended, Ellis would fly his gunship low to the ground in order to intimidate the RUF and cause their armed trucks to overturn due to the downdraft. Such was the impact on their morale that the RUF sent numerous death threats to Ellis and placed a price on his head, to which he and his crew responded by dropping thousands of leaflets with a picture of their Mi-24 and the words "RUF: this time we've dropped leaflets. Next time it will be a half-inch Gatling gun machine gun, or 57mm rockets, or 23mm guns, or 30mm grenades, or ALL OF THEM!"

These efforts would eventually draw the attention of British military command once more, who upon their decision to return to Sierra Leone agreed to provide his crew with support and work in conjunction with him in their operations. In September 2000, Ellis flew his helicopter in support of Operation Barras, a rescue mission of several soldiers from the Royal Irish Regiment who had been captured by the West Side Boys and would provide air support to the Special Air Service in military operations.

Ellis and his crew would stay in Sierra Leone until the defeat of the RUF in 2002 - he later went on to operate in Afghanistan and Iraq in support of Coalition forces.
