= Honoris Crux (1952) =

Former South African military decoration

- Captain Geoff Heim's Honoris Crux
- Type: Military decoration for bravery
- Awarded for: Gallantry in action against the enemy
- Country: South Africa
- Presented by: the Monarch of the United Kingdom and the Commonwealth realms and, from 1961, the State President
- Eligibility: All Ranks
- Post-nominals: HC
- Campaign: 1966-1989 Border War
- Clasps: Bar for subsequent award
- Status: Discontinued in 1975
- Established: 1952
- First award: 1973
- Final award: 1975

Highlights
- Total: 5
- Ribbon bar

SADF pre-1994 & SANDF post-2002 orders of wear
- Next (higher): SADF precedence: Louw Wepener Decoration; SANDF precedence: Gallantry Cross, Gold
- Next (lower): SADF succession: Honoris Crux Silver; SANDF succession: Honoris Crux Silver

The Honoris Crux (Cross of Honour) of 1952, post-nominal letters HC, is a military decoration for bravery which was instituted by the Union of South Africa in 1952. It was in use from 1952 to 1975 and was awarded to members of the South African Defence Force for gallantry in action against the enemy in the field. It was discontinued on 1 July 1975, when it was replaced by a new set of four Honoris Crux decorations, in four classes.

== The South African military ==
The Union Defence Forces (UDF) were established in 1912 and renamed the South African Defence Force (SADF) in 1958. On 27 April 1994, it was integrated with six other independent forces into the South African National Defence Force (SANDF).

== Institution ==
The Honoris Crux of 1952, post-nominal letters HC, was instituted by Queen Elizabeth II on 6 April 1952, during the Tercentenary Van Riebeeck Festival.

== Award criteria ==
Bar to the HC

The Honoris Crux of 1952 was awarded for gallantry in action against the enemy in the field. A Bar could be awarded for a further similar deed of bravery. Only five awards were made, the first in 1973 and the others in 1974 and 1975, all to helicopter pilots and flight engineers of the South African Air Force. The first decoration was awarded to Captain A.P. (Aap) Möller. No bar to the decoration was ever awarded.

== Order of wear ==
With effect from 6 April 1952, when the Honoris Crux and several other new decorations and medals were instituted, these new awards took precedence before all earlier British orders, decorations and medals awarded to South Africans, with the exception of the Victoria Cross, which still took precedence before all other awards. The other older British awards continued to be worn in the order prescribed by the British Central Chancery of the Orders of Knighthood.

The position of the Honoris Crux of 1952 in the official order of precedence was revised twice after 1975, to accommodate the inclusion or institution of new decorations and medals. These revisions took place upon the integration into the South African National Defence Force in 1994, and upon the institution of a new set of awards in 2003.

South African Defence Force until 26 April 1994

- Official SADF order of precedence:
  - Preceded by the Louw Wepener Decoration (LWD).
  - Succeeded by the Honoris Crux Silver (HCS).
- Official national order of precedence:
  - Preceded by the Railways Police Cross for Valour.
  - Succeeded by the Honoris Crux Silver (HCS).

South African National Defence Force from 27 April 1994

- Official SANDF order of precedence:
  - Preceded by the Gallantry Cross, Gold of the Republic of Venda.
  - Succeeded by the Honoris Crux Silver (HCS) of the Republic of South Africa.
- Official national order of precedence:
  - Preceded by the Railways Police Cross for Valour of the Republic of South Africa.
  - Succeeded by the Honoris Crux Silver (HCS) of the Republic of South Africa.

The position of the Honoris Crux of 1952 in the order of precedence remained unchanged, as it was on 27 April 1994, when a new series of military orders, decorations and medals was instituted on 27 April 2003.

== Description ==
Obverse

The Honoris Crux of 1952 is a silver-gilt Maltese cross which fits in a 45 millimetres diameter circle, with the arms of the cross in green enamel and with four eagles between the arms, all looking towards their right, with a roundel in the centre tierced horizontally in enameled orange, white and blue bands which represent the national flag and framed in a red circle inscribed "HONORIS CRUX". The cross is suspended from a laurel wreath, in the form of a circular ribbon hanger, with the leaves in green enamel.

Reverse

The reverse has the pre-1994 South African coat of arms, with the decoration number stamped at the bottom on the rim. Specimens which were minted before South Africa became a republic in 1961, had Queen Elizabeth's royal cipher (E II R) above the coat of arms. The royal cipher was removed in 1961, but without relocating the coat of arms to the centre of the decoration.

Ribbon

The ribbon is 32 millimetres wide, with a 3 millimetres wide red band, a 2 millimetres wide white band, a 22 millimetres wide dark green band, a 2 millimetres wide white band and a 3 millimetres wide red band.

Bar

Bar button

The Bar to denote a subsequent award of the decoration, is 32 millimetres wide and silver-gilt, in its centre an eagle, similar to those between the arms of the cross on the decoration itself. When only ribbon bars are worn, a recipient of a subsequent award would have worn a silve-gilt button depicting this eagle, 8 millimetres in diameter, on the ribbon bar.

== Discontinuation ==
Conferment of the decoration was discontinued in respect of services performed on or after 1 July 1975, when the Honoris Crux of 1952 was replaced by a new set of four Honoris Crux decorations, in four classes.

== Recipients ==
Name	Rank	Year awarded	HC no.	Date of action	Unit	Service Arm
Möller, A.P. (Aap)	Capt	1973	1	26-Jan-73	19 Sqn	South African Air Force
Heim, G.L. (Geoff)	Capt	1974	2	18-Feb-74	16 Sqn	South African Air Force
Beukes, R.J.	Sgt	1974	3	18-Feb-74	17 Sqn	South African Air Force
White, D.S. (Denzil)	Capt	1975	4	7-Dec-74	19 Sqn	South African Air Force
Burger, J.A.C.	F Sgt	1975	5	7-Dec-74	16 Sqn	South African Air Force
