= Danny Roxo =

Portuguese soldier (1933–1976)

Danny Roxo HC CG
- Born: 1 February 1933; Mogadouro, Trás-os-Montes
- Died: 23 August 1976 (aged 43); Near the Okavango River
- Military career
- Allegiance: Portugal; South Africa
- Branch: Portuguese Army; South African Army
- Rank: Staff Sergeant
- Nicknames: The Phantom of the Forest, The White Devil
- Unit: 32 Battalion
- Conflicts: Portuguese Colonial War; Operation Savannah
- Awards: Honoris Crux (1975) HC War Cross

Francisco Daniel Roxo (1 February 1933 – 23 August 1976), best known as Danny Roxo, was a Portuguese hunter, safari guide, and soldier. Born in Mogadouro, he emigrated to Niassa Province, Portuguese Mozambique during the 1950s, where he established himself as a professional hunter. Roxo later fought in the Mozambican War of Independence against nationalist guerrillas. After Mozambican independence he served as a foreign volunteer in 32 Battalion, a Portuguese-speaking unit of the South African Army.

== Early life ==
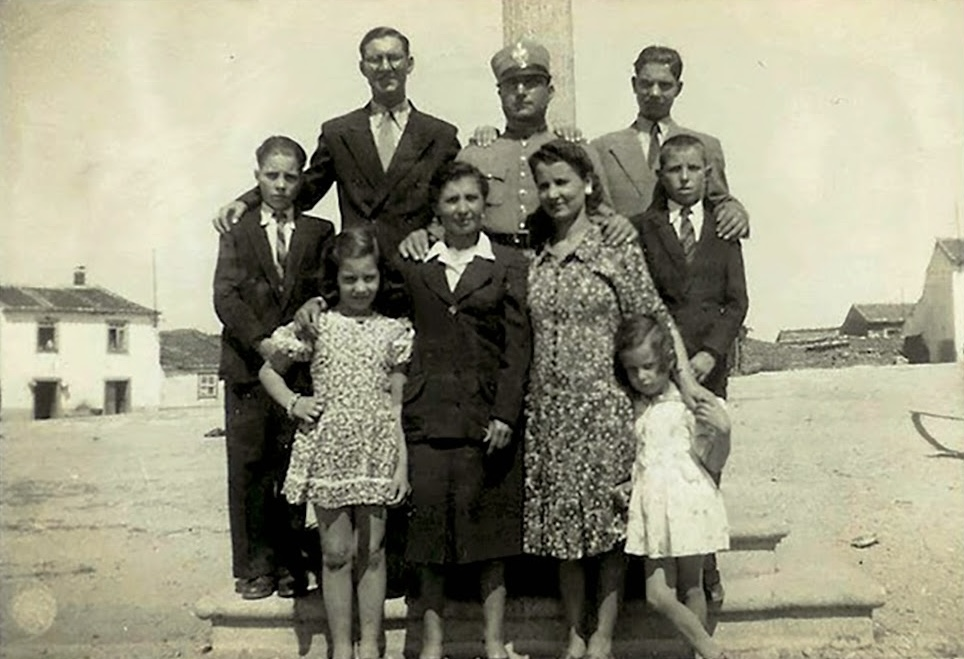
Family photo of Daniel Roxo in Mogadouro, between 1938-1940

Daniel Roxo was born in Mogadouro, Trás-os-Montes, on 1 February 1933. As a young man he immigrated to Niassa Province in 1951, where he settled as a professional hunter and safari guide. When the Mozambican War of Independence broke out in 1964 Roxo formed his African trackers, servants, and European acquaintances into a private militia, hunting FRELIMO combatants for government bounties.

Disillusioned by Portugal's promise to hand Mozambique to Samora Machel's incoming government, Roxo supported an abortive coup d'état by anti-FRELIMO forces in Lourenço Marques on September 7, 1974. He went into exile in South Africa the following November, joining the South African Defence Force. After completing Special Forces selection, Danny was seconded to Bravo Group (later 32 Battalion).

== South African military career ==
=== Operation Savannah ===
Roxo was awarded the Honoris Crux for bravery during Operation Savannah for an action during the Battle of Bridge 14 at 11.05°S 15.0822°E, an engagement during which he single-handedly killed eleven enemy soldiers.

Bridge 14 was situated on the Nhia River, en route from Cela to Quibala. South African mechanized contingents deploying to the south had routed a unit of the People's Armed Forces for the Liberation of Angola (FAPLA) some time prior, and the retreating Angolans had demolished the existing structure. However, since Colonel Jan Breytenbach could not ascertain this from his forward positions, he ordered Roxo to conduct a more thorough reconnaissance. Roxo arrived at the river with four Eland-90 armoured cars; his patrol came under heavy mortar fire from an opposite bank and two of the vehicles withdrew, leaving Roxo's platoon to retire on foot. Having scouted the bridge alone and determined it was no longer intact, he inadvertently walked into an FAPLA ambush, but he managed to dispatch his attackers. Two escaped South African prisoners later claimed that aside from the Angolan casualties, four Cuban troops were reported killed in the encounter.

=== Death ===
During a patrol near the Okavango river, his personnel carrier struck a landmine and overturned, killing one man and crushing Roxo beneath it. The rest of the vehicle's crew tried to lift it free, but it was too heavy. Breytenbach wrote:

"Roxo, in keeping with his dauntless character, decided to make the best of things, lighting a cigarette and smoking it calmly until it was finished, then he died - still pinned beneath the Wolf. He had not complained once, nor uttered a single groan or moan, although the pain must have been excruciating."

== Awards ==
- Honoris Crux (1975) (HC) (South Africa)
- War Cross (Class II) (Note: Portuguese: Cruz de Guerra Class II – Device is a gold cross) (Portugal)
- War Cross (Class III) (Note: Portuguese: Cruz de Guerra Class III – Device is a silver cross) (Portugal)

== See also ==
- Battle of Bridge 14
- 32 Battalion (South Africa)
