= Lambert Jackson Woodburne =

South African admiral (1939–2013)

Vice Admiral Lambert Jackson Woodburne DVR SD SM SM SAN
- Nickname: Woody
- Born: 13 July 1939; Kimberley, Cape Province, South Africa
- Died: 5 July 2013 (aged 73) Muizenberg, Cape Town, Western Cape, South Africa
- Allegiance: South Africa
- Branch: South African Navy
- Service years: 1958–1992
- Rank: Vice admiral
- Commands: Chief of the South African Navy; Flag Officer Commanding Naval Command West; Chief of Naval Staff Operations; Director of Naval Operations; SAS Emily Hobhouse (S98); SAS Mosselbaai; SAS Johannesburg
- Awards: Van Riebeeck Decoration DVR Southern Cross Decoration SD Southern Cross Medal SM Pro Patria Medal Good Service Medal
- Spouse: Vivienne Kemp (div. 1992)

Vice Admiral Lambert Jackson Woodburne DVR SD SM SAN (13 July 1939 – 5 July 2013) was Chief of the South African Navy from 1 July 1990 to 31 August 1992. He is one of only two people to have been awarded the Van Riebeeck Decoration, which he received for Special Forces operations in Tanzania. He was more commonly known by his nickname "Woody".

== Early life ==
Woodburne was born in Kimberley, South Africa in 1939. His father was a South African Air Force wartime pilot who farmed near Maclear in the Eastern Cape, South Africa. Woodburne was schooled in the Eastern Cape and Swaziland and served in the Naval Gymnasium at Saldanha Bay in 1958. He then joined the Permanent Force and enrolled for a Bachelor of Military Science (B. Mil) degree studying at both Stellenbosch University and the Faculty of Military Science at the South African Military Academy from 1960 to 1961. He did not graduate and after his time at the Academy he started maritime service on frigates.

== Military career ==
Woodburne completed the Specialist Mine Warfare and Clearance Diving Course in the United Kingdom where he came top of the class. On his return to South Africa he became the Officer in Charge of the Naval Diving School in Simon's Town for two years. The Navy Diver of the Course still receives the Woody Woodburne Shield. Woodburne went on to command the mine sweepers SAS Mosselbaai and SAS Johannesburg.

With the establishment of the Submarine Branch, he volunteered for submarines and was chosen as the first commanding officer of SAS Emily Hobhouse (S98) in 1971; a position held until 1974. During the submarine’s work-up in France, he was described as one of the “best foreign submariners ever worked up in France”, which earned him the Southern Cross Medal.

In 1972, the SAS Emily Hobhouse landed Special Forces troops led by Commandant Jan Breytenbach near Dar es Salaam as part of a raid on the Tanzanian port. The Special Forces team placed explosives on a bridge, next to power lines and other targets around the city. While making the pickup rendezvous, the submarine snagged a fishing net and sank the fishing vessel dragging the net. This mission earned Woodburne the Van Riebeeck Decoration.

From 1975 to 1977, he was assigned to the Agosta submarine project. After this he served with the Special Forces (1978–1983) in the post of Senior Staff Officer: Operations (Navy) at Special Forces Headquarters, where he attained the rank of Captain. These were "exciting and dangerous years" said Woodburne in an interview after announcing his retirement in August 1992.

From 1983 to 1985, he was the military attaché in Argentina. In 1986 Commodore Woodburne became Director of Naval Operations, then seven months later Chief of Naval Staff Operations. In January 1989 Rear-Admiral Woodburne moved to the Western Cape as Flag Officer Commanding Naval Command West. On 1 July 1990 he was promoted to Vice-Admiral and appointed as Chief of the South African Navy, a position he held until retirement on 31 August 1992.

== Personal life ==
Woodburne married Vivienne Kemp and the couple had two daughters, but they divorced after his retirement.

Woodburne was diagnosed with progressive supranuclear palsy in 2007 and began using a wheelchair. He died on 5 July 2013 and was accorded a military funeral in Simon's Town.

== Decorations and medals ==
Van Riebeeck Decoration (DVR)	1972
Southern Cross Decoration (SD)	
Southern Cross Medal (1952) (SM)	(1952) 1971
Southern Cross Medal (1975) (SM)	(1975)
Pro Patria Medal	
Good Service Medal (Gold (30 Years))	
Good Service Medal (Silver (20 Years))	
Good Service Medal (Bronze (10 Years))	

Vice Admiral Woodburne's medal group is unique as it contains the Van Riebeeck Decoration plus two Southern Cross Medals – the 1952–1975 version and the 1976 version, both of which allowed the wearer to use the post nominal letters SM.

The citation for the Van Riebeeck Decoration reads:

Lieutenant Commander Lambert Woodburne distinguished himself by displaying outstanding leadership, perseverance and devotion to duty in a special task of a delicate and dangerous nature during 1972.

== Notes and references ==
Military offices
Preceded by Andries Putter	Chief of the South African Navy; 1990–1992	Succeeded by Robert Claude Simpson-Anderson
Preceded by Chris Bennett	Flag Officer Commanding NAVCOM West; 1989–1990	Succeeded by Position disbanded
Unknown	Chief of Naval Staff Operations; 1986–1989	Unknown
