= 32 Battalion (South Africa) =

- 32 Battalion emblem
- Active: 1975 – 26 March 1993
- Country: South Africa
- Branch: South African Army
- Type: Light infantry
- Size: Battalion
- Part of: South African Defence Force
- Nickname: Buffalo Battalion/Os Terríveis (English: The Terrible Ones")
- Motto: Proelio Procusi (English: "Forged in Battle")
- Engagements: South African Border War

Commanders
- Founder: Colonel Jan Breytenbach
- Subsequent commanders: Col Gert Nel; Col Deon Ferreira (Falcon); Col Eddie Viljoen (Big Daddy)

Insignia
- Battalion flag

32 Battalion (sometimes nicknamed Buffalo Battalion, Three-two battalion or Portuguese: Os Terríveis for The Terrible Ones) was an elite light infantry battalion of the South African Army founded in 1975, composed of black and white commissioned and enlisted personnel. It was disbanded on 26 March 1993.

== History ==
=== Military refugees ===
After the victory of the Movimento Popular de Libertação de Angola (MPLA) in the Angolan War of Independence in 1975, many troops of its main rival, the Frente Nacional de Libertação de Angola (National Liberation Front of Angola, FNLA), found refuge in the then South African-controlled South West Africa.

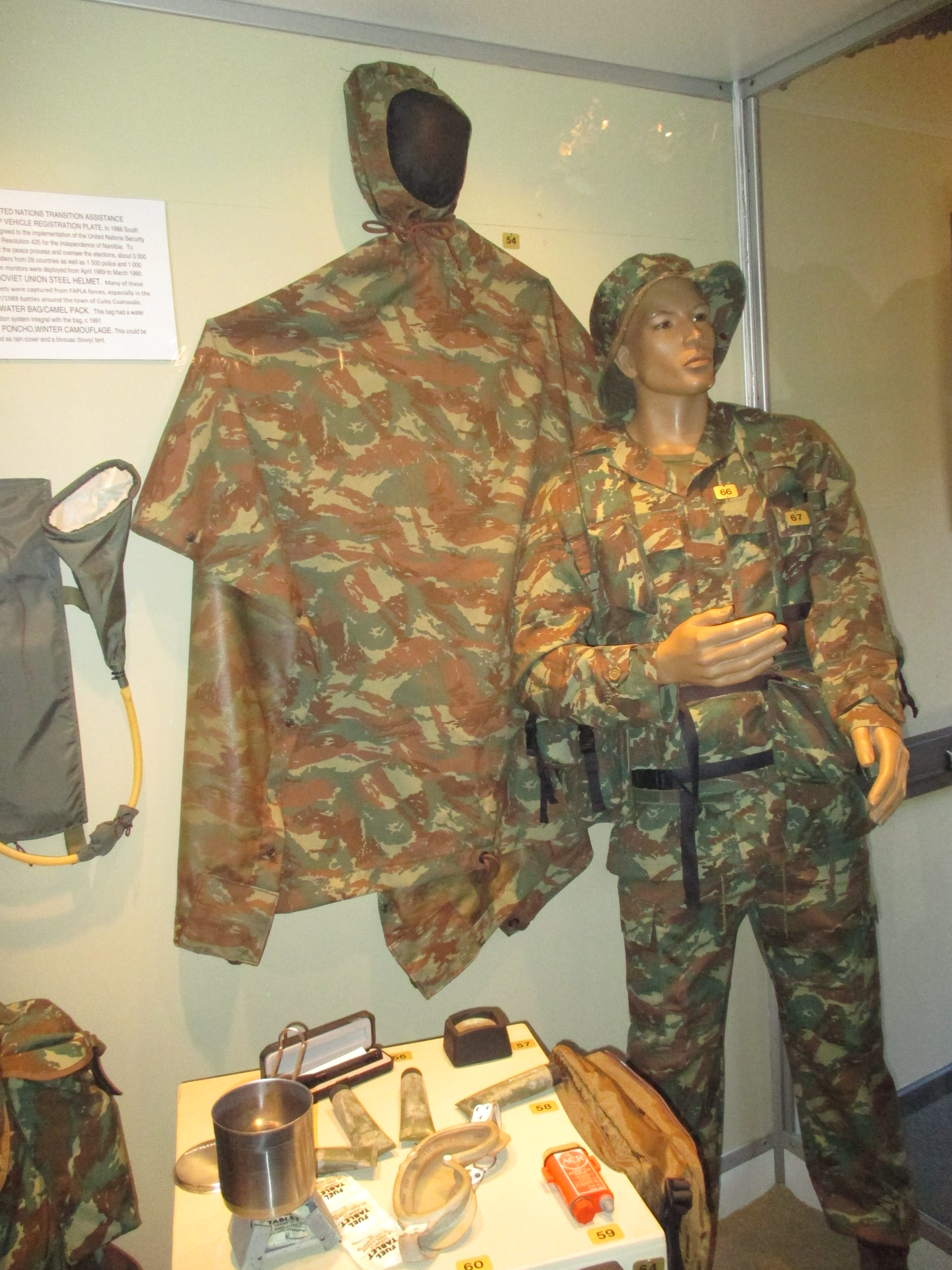
32 Battalion uniforms. Members of the unit often impersonated Angolan security forces.

=== Formation of Bravo Group ===
From these troops, Colonel Jan Breytenbach together with Commandant Sybie van der Spuy formed a unit that was initially known as Bravo Group but later renamed 32 Battalion. Initially, Bravo Group consisted of two infantry companies, a mortar platoon, an anti-tank section and a machine gun platoon, but 32 Battalion was finally expanded to seven infantry companies, a reconnaissance wing, and a support company consisting of 81 mm mortar, anti-tank and machine gun sections.

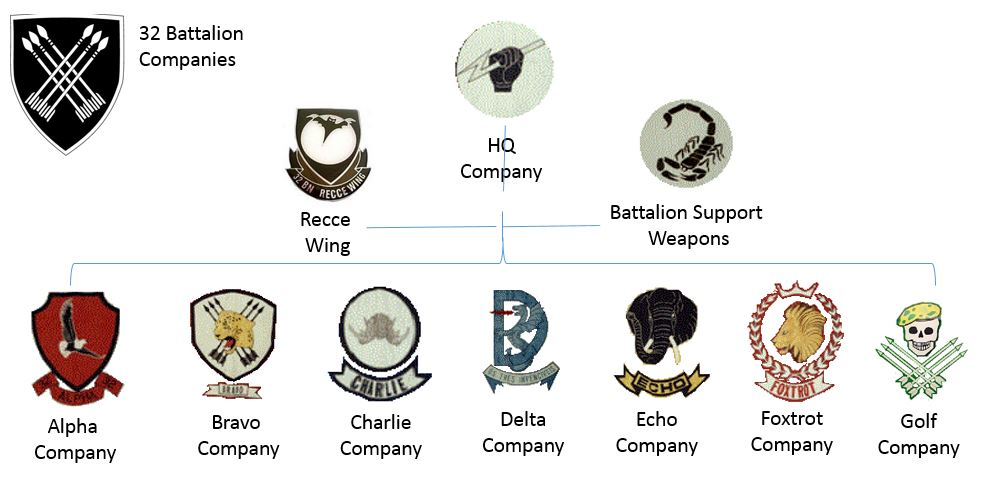

=== Redeployed as the SADF ===
Unlike other South African Defence Forces (SADF) units, 32 Battalion was mainly deployed in southern Angola, acting as a buffer between the SADF's regular forces and its enemies. The unit was also used to assist the anti-communist movement of the National Union for the Total Independence of Angola (UNITA). Although it was mainly used as a counter-insurgency force it was eventually also used as a semi-conventional force, especially during the later phases of the war – particularly at the Battle of Cuito Cuanavale.

The battalion consisted of around 700 riflemen and NCOs (non-commissioned officers) (mostly Angolan nationals associated with the former FNLA or the Portuguese Army) and mainly South African officers, although commissioned military personnel from countries such as Australia, Rhodesia, Portugal and the United States were active with the battalion, especially in its early stages. As time progressed a number of SNCOs (senior non-commissioned officers – sergeants and above), distinguished themselves and were commissioned.

At the end of its era in Namibia, the unit had developed into a conventional battle group. Apart from the infantry companies and the recce company, the battalion was strengthened by a battery of 120 mm (4.7 in) mortars, a squadron of Ratel ZT-3 and 90 mm (3.5 in) tank destroyers and a troop of 20 mm (0.79 in) anti-aircraft guns mounted on Buffel infantry vehicles.

Although the main bulk of the battalion was based at Buffalo on the banks of the Okavango River, the HQ was in Rundu, 200 km (120 mi) to the west.

=== Namibian independence ===
After Namibian independence in 1989–1990, the unit was withdrawn to South Africa where it was further used in a counter-insurgency role on South Africa's borders and later also in townships.

=== Phola Park Incident ===
On 8 April 1992, members of 32 Battalion were involved in an incident in Phola Park, Gauteng where members of the public were shot and killed. The incident drew widespread criticism, specifically from the African National Congress (ANC) and prompted the Minister of Defence to request an investigation by the Goldstone Commission.

=== Disbandment ===
As one of the results of the negotiations between the National Party and the ANC, the unit was disbanded in March 1993. After the battalion was disbanded, the remaining members of the unit were transferred to other SADF-units such as the Parachute and Mechanised Battalions as well as the Recces. It was also decided to reactivate 2 SAI at Pomfret which enabled about a quarter of the troops to return to Pomfret as members of the new 2 SAI. However, when 2 SAI was moved to Zeerust in 1999, many of them decided to rather stay behind at Pomfret and handed in their resignations. In 2008 there still remained about a quarter of the original 1,000 "three-two" families at Pomfret, eking out mainly a hand-to-mouth existence.

Many members of the unit later helped to found or joined private military companies such as Executive Outcomes and Sandline International, which fought on the side of the Angolan government against UNITA. Executive Outcomes was utilized by the Sierra Leonean government to repel RUF forces between March 1995 and March 1997 during the Sierra Leone Civil War.

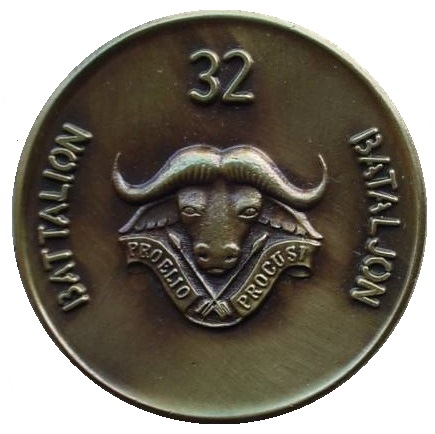
SADF 32 Battalion commemorative medallion

=== Equatorial Guinea coup ===
Some of the participants in the alleged 2004 Equatorial Guinea coup d'état attempt were former members of 32 Battalion. Because they were arrested in Zimbabwe, it is not clear whether any of those arrested had full knowledge of their final destination or the alleged plan to carry out a coup d'état.

== Decorations ==
The battalion was one of the most decorated units during the South African Border War, with a total of 13 Honoris Crux medals for bravery awarded to its members, second only to the South African Special Forces Brigade, whose members were awarded 46 Honoris Crux medals during the same period.

List of 32 Battalion recipients of the Honoris Crux
- Lieutenant Connie van Wyk
- Sergeant Danny Roxo
- Warrant Officer 2 Willy Ward
- Major Eddie Viljoen
- Lance Corporal Feliciano Costa
- Corporal Eduardo João
- Second Lieutenant Petrus Nel
- Corporal Victor Dracula
- Rifleman Bernardo Domingos
- Major Hannes Nortmann
- Sergeant Rihan Rupping
- Captain Petrus van Zyl – Operation Moduler
- Lieutenant Tobias de Vos – Operation Moduler

== In fiction ==
In the 2006 film Blood Diamond, Leonardo DiCaprio's Rhodesian character "Danny Archer" was a former member of 32 Battalion.

In the 2013 film Elysium, Sharlto Copley's character "Kruger" was an ex-member of 32 Battalion.

In the 2023 film Freelance, Marton Csokas' character Colonel Jan Koehorst is a former member of 32 Battalion.

In the 2023 book Okavango by French author Caryl Férey, multiple characters are former members of 32 Battalion.

== Leadership ==
32 Battalion Leadership
From	Commanding Officers	To	Ribbon
1975	Col Jan Breytenbach DVR,SD,SM,MMM	1977	Van Riebeeck Decoration DVR Southern Cross Decoration SD Southern Cross Medal SM Military Merit Medal MMM
1977	Col Gert Nel	1978	
1978	Col Deon Ferreira (Falcon) PVD,SD,SM,MMM (Note: Later Lieutenant General) (Note: Later Chief of Joint Operations)	1983	Pro Virtute Decoration PVD Southern Cross Decoration SD Southern Cross Medal SM Military Merit Medal MMM
1984	Col Eddie Viljoen (Big Daddy)	1988	
n.d.	Col Jock Harris	n.d.	
1988	Col Mucho Delport	1993	
From	Regimental Sergeants Major	To	Ribbon
1978	WO1 Pep Van Zyl	1980	
1980	WO1 Ickes Uekermann	1982	
1983	WO1 PW van Heerden	1983	
1984	WO1 Fanie Joubert	1985	
1985	WO1 Piet Nortje	1987	
1988	WO1 Tallies Botha	1991	
1992	WO1 Tienie Geldenhuys	1993	

== Insignia ==
=== Dress Insignia ===
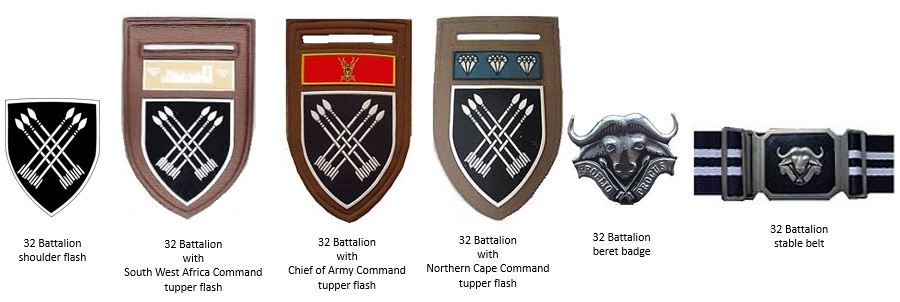
SADF era 32 Battalion insignia

== See also ==
- South African Special Forces Brigade ("Recces")
- List of operations of the South African Border War
- Operation Savannah
