= Operation Super =

- Part of the South African Border War
- Cambêno Valley (Angola)
- Objective: Prevent PLAN guerrillas infiltrating into South West Africa through the Kaokoveld.
- Date: 9–14 March 1982
- Outcome: South Africa Victory
- Casualties: 197 PLAN Killed

Operation Super was a military confrontation during the South African Border War in March 1982 to prevent SWAPO guerrillas infiltrating into South West Africa through the Kaokoveld from a location near the abandoned Portuguese town of Iona in the Angolan province of Namibe.

== Order of Battle ==
=== South African forces ===
- 10 men - 5 Reconnaissance Regiment
- several platoon elements - 32 Battalion
- 2 Alouette III gunships and Puma transport helicopters

=== PLAN forces ===
- over 230 men

== Battles ==
=== Initial contact ===
On 9 March 1982, ten SADF South African Special Forces Brigade soldiers ("Recces") dressed in PLAN uniforms launched a reconnaissance mission near Iona, based on intelligence they had gathered about SWAPO operations in the area. A standby force consisting of a platoon from 32 Battalion and two Alouette gunships stood ready to react when required. The Recces, who were inserted by helicopter, quickly determined that there was considerable PLAN vehicle traffic in the area. After planting a TM 62 anti-tank landmine in the road, they withdrew to high ground to observe what unfolded. Later in the day, 10 March, six PLAN trucks entered the valley, with one of them detonating the mine. The mine left the vehicle stranded and its occupants simply transferred to the other vehicles before driving off, two heading south and three returning northwards.

A while later a patrol of 28 PLAN soldiers arrived on the scene on foot and started looking for evidence of the attackers. They eventually found the tracks of the Recces and started following them. The Recces, realising that their position was now compromised, immediately called for reinforcements from 32 Battalion who were assigned to cover them.

Meanwhile, the Recces were running out of time while they waited for the reinforcements to arrive. In a desperate attempt to stall for time, they tried to pass themselves off as PLAN soldiers as soon as the PLAN patrol was within earshot, accusing the PLAN patrol of being members of UNITA. A fierce argument between the parties ensued but ended abruptly when the Recce commander shot the PLAN commander. A heated firefight erupted, that was joined at this time by 32 Battalion and an Alouette helicopter gunship fitted with 20 mm MG 151 cannon. When the fighting finally stopped, 21 PLAN soldiers had been killed, seven captured and one escaped.

Interrogation of the PLAN prisoners captured during this action revealed the presence of a previously unknown camp nearby in the Cambêno Valley at 16.9413°S 12.6088°E, so a plan was immediately formulated to attack it.

=== Camp assault ===
A helicopter-borne assault involving 40 members of 32 Battalion was launched on 12 March; however, the attack had to be aborted at the last minute due to thunderstorm activity that limited visibility. It was feared that any further attempt to attack the camp would be futile, as the helicopters had been close enough to be heard. However, scouts positioned around the area reported no movement out the valley, so a second attack was launched at dawn the following day, 13 March.

The helicopters initially struggled to find the well-camouflaged camp, until they were virtually on top of it. At this point, the enemy, realising they had been spotted, started firing at the helicopters with everything they had. The 32 Battalion assault force was immediately dropped, only 50m from the camp where the intense fire was coming from. The assault force consisted of two platoons and an 81 mm mortar section.

The guerrillas had built their camp in the bottom of the valley flanked by high ground on either side., a factor that played strongly against them in the ensuing 18-hour battle. Alouette helicopter gunships used their MG 151 cannons to great effect, but were fired upon in turn with RPG rockets and at least 4 SAM-7 missiles (the latter not arming due to the helicopters being too close). The battle was fought throughout the rocky ravine supported by mortar fire. The battle lasted over seven hours by which time the soldiers of 32 Battalion resorted to using enemy weapons as they began to run out of ammunition. As evening fell, the 32 Battalion company readied itself for a PLAN counterattack.

== Aftermath ==
By the next morning, 14 March, a further 24 SADF soldiers were flown in, but no counterattack by PLAN occurred. and the battlefield was found to be littered with dead. 197 insurgents and 3 members of 32 Battalion died, with seven to eight prisoners captured. Significant quantities of food, weapons and logistical equipment were captured by the South Africans. From information gathered from the interrogation of the prisoners, a search over three weeks was made for a further PLAN base consisting of 50 soldiers. This search, carried out by a company from 32 Battalion, failed to find the base which was supposedly south of Iona.
