= Kevin Winterbottom =

South African Air Force officer

Kevin Roy Winterbottom
- Born: 1955; Pretoria, South Africa
- Died: 9 June 1976 (aged 20–21); Pretoria, South Africa
- Military career
- Allegiance: South Africa
- Branch: South African Air Force
- Rank: 2nd Lieutenant
- Service number: 70388129PE
- Unit: 4 Squadron SAAF
- Awards: Honoris Crux (1975) HC

Kevin Roy Winterbottom (1955 – 9 June 1976) was a South African Air Force (SAAF) pilot who chose to avoid crashing his stricken Impala jet aircraft in the Monument Park suburb of Pretoria by remaining with his aircraft to the end. He was posthumously awarded the 25th Honoris Crux decoration for bravery, the first such award for gallantry outside battle. The HC was at the time South Africa's highest military decoration that could be awarded in peacetime.

== Early life ==
Winterbottom was born in Pretoria, Transvaal Province, South Africa. He attended Pretoria Boys High School where he matriculated in 1972.

== Service and fatal accident ==
Winterbottom joined the SAAF in 1973, entering Officer and Pilot training. He was serving with 4 Squadron at the time of his death.

On the morning of 9 June 1976, Winterbottom was piloting Atlas MB326 km Impala Mk II #1022. While making his approach to land at Waterkloof Air Force Base an engine failure due to a bird strike left him with no thrust and insufficient altitude to reach the airfield. His options were to eject and risk the aircraft crashing with possible casualties in the suburban areas of Waterkloof or Monument Park in Pretoria, or to remain with his aircraft and guide it away from populated areas. He chose the latter, steering his aircraft to crash into a small deserted recreation park where he was killed instantly on impact.

Winterbottom's ashes were scattered at the SAAF Memorial.

=== Awards ===
- Honoris Crux (1975) (HC)
