= Van Riebeeck Decoration =

- Van Riebeeck Decoration and Bar
- Type: Military decoration for bravery
- Awarded for: Distinguished service in the field
- Country: South Africa
- Presented by: the Monarch of the United Kingdom and the Commonwealth realms and, from 1961, the State President
- Eligibility: Officers
- Post-nominals: DVR
- Status: Discontinued in 1975
- Established: 1952
- First award: 1974
- Final award: 1974

Highlights
- Total: 2
- Ribbon bar

SADF pre-1994 & SANDF post-2002 orders of wear
- Next (higher): SADF precedence: Honoris Crux Silver; SANDF precedence: Honoris Crux Silver
- Next (lower): SADF succession: Honoris Crux (1975); SANDF succession: Honoris Crux (1975)

The Van Riebeeck Decoration, post-nominal letters DVR, is a South African military decoration for bravery which was instituted by the Union of South Africa in 1952. It was awarded to officers for distinguished service in the field.

== The South African military ==
The Union Defence Forces (UDF) were established in 1912 and renamed the South African Defence Force (SADF) in 1958. On 27 April 1994, it was integrated with six other independent forces into the South African National Defence Force (SANDF).

== Institution ==
The Van Riebeeck Decoration, post-nominal letters DVR, was instituted by Queen Elizabeth II on 6 April 1952, during the Tercentenary Van Riebeeck Festival. The logical post-nominal letters would have been VRD, but since those were already being used for the Decoration for Officers of the Royal Naval Volunteer Reserve, which had also been awarded to South Africans, the letters DVR were chosen instead.

== Award criteria ==
The Van Riebeeck Decoration was awarded to officers for distinguished service against an enemy in the field. Only two decorations were ever awarded, both in 1972. A silver-gilt bar was authorised to denote a second award, but was never awarded.

== Order of wear ==
With effect from 6 April 1952, when the Van Riebeeck Decoration and several other new decorations and medals were instituted, these new awards took precedence before all earlier British orders, decorations and medals awarded to South Africans, with the exception of the Victoria Cross, which still took precedence before all other awards. The other older British awards continued to be worn in the order prescribed by the British Central Chancery of the Orders of Knighthood.

The position of the Van Riebeeck Decoration in the official order of precedence was revised twice after 1975, to accommodate the inclusion or institution of new decorations and medals, first with the integration into the South African National Defence Force on 27 April 1994, and again with the institution of a new set of awards on 27 April 2003.

South African Defence Force until 26 April 1994

- Official SADF order of precedence:
  - Preceded by the Honoris Crux Silver (HCS).
  - Succeeded by the Honoris Crux (1975) (HC).
- Official national order of precedence:
  - Preceded by the Honoris Crux Silver (HCS).
  - Succeeded by the South African Police Cross for Bravery, Silver (PCFS).

South African National Defence Force from 27 April 1994

- Official SANDF order of precedence:
  - Preceded by the Honoris Crux Silver (HCS) of the Republic of South Africa.
  - Succeeded by the Honoris Crux (1975) (HC) of the Republic of South Africa.
- Official national order of precedence:
  - Preceded by the Honoris Crux Silver (HCS) of the Republic of South Africa.
  - Succeeded by the South African Police Silver Cross for Gallantry (SCG) of the Republic of South Africa.

The position of the Van Riebeeck Decoration in the order of precedence remained unchanged, as it was on 27 April 1994, when decorations and medals were belatedly instituted in April 1996 for the two former non-statutory forces, the Azanian People's Liberation Army and Umkhonto we Sizwe, and again when a new series of military orders, decorations and medals was instituted in South Africa on 27 April 2003. However, the two police decorations which succeed the Van Riebeeck Decoration, the South African Police Silver Cross for Gallantry (SCG) and the South African Police Cross for Bravery, Silver (PCFS), exchanged seniority in the official order of precedence, as published in 1994 and 2003 respectively.

== Description ==
Obverse

The Van Riebeeck Decoration was struck in silver-gilt and is in the shape of the five-pointed outline of the Castle of Good Hope, to fit in a 38 millimetres diameter circle. The suspension consists of a cluster of eight protea leaves. The statue of Jan van Riebeeck, which stands in the Heerengracht in Cape Town, is depicted in relief against a background of three rings, representing Van Riebeeck's three ships, with the outer ring inscribed "UITNEMENDE DIENS" at left and "DISTINGUISHED SERVICE" at right.

Reverse

The reverse has the pre-1994 South African Coat of Arms. Specimens struck before 31 May 1961 had Queen Elizabeth II's royal cipher (E II R) above the coat of arms, but this was removed by the time the decoration was first awarded.

Ribbon

The ribbon is 32 millimetres wide and sky blue.

Ribbon bar button

Bar

The Bar displays a field cannon in its centre. When ribbons alone are worn, a separate button displaying a field cannon would have been worn on the ribbon bar. The Bar was never awarded.

== Discontinuation ==
The Van Riebeeck Decoration was discontinued in July 1975, when the military decorations and medals of the Republic were revised and some of the 1952 series of decorations and medals were replaced with new decorations and medals.

== Recipients ==
DVR no.	Name	Rank	Service	Unit	Date	Action cited for
1	Breytenbach, Jan	Cmdt	SA Army	1 RR	2 Aug 1974	Special Forces operation in Tanzania
2	Woodburne, Lambert Jackson	Lt Cdr	SA Navy	SAS EH	2 Aug 1974	Special Forces operation in Tanzania
