= 1 Reconnaissance Commando (South Africa) =

- Active: 1972
- Disbanded: 1997
- Country: South Africa
- Allegiance: Republic of South Africa
- Branch: South African Army
- Type: Special forces
- Part of: South African Defence Force
- Garrison/HQ: Durban
- Motto: Through Stealth Our Strength

Commanders
- Notable commanders: Cmdt Jan Breytenbach

The 1 Reconnaissance Commando was the first South African special forces unit, founded by General Fritz Loots - the founder of the South African Special Forces, and the first General Officer Commanding of the South African Special Forces. He appointed 11 qualified paratroopers (known as "The Dirty Dozen", although they were made up of only 11 men) as the founder members. Included in these 11 paratroopers was Jan Breytenbach, who was placed in command of the Founder Members by General Loots.

== History ==
Major General Loots and the Chief of the Army, Lt. General Willem Louw realised the need for a South African Defence Force to have a special operations capability, but the Chief of the SADF, General Rudolph Hiemstra resisted. It was not until Admiral Hugo Biermann became Chief of the South African Defence Force in 1972 that the go-ahead was granted.

The unit was originally based at Oudtshoorn in the Cape Province, but was moved to Durban in 1974, where it was formally named 1 Reconnaissance Commando. In the early 1980s, the unit had less than 40 Recce's based at 1RR of which the majority were white. It was renamed 1 Reconnaissance Regiment in 1996, but was disbanded and integrated into 4 Reconnaissance Regiment and 5 Reconnaissance Regiment in 1997.

The South African Special Forces is a unit under the South African National Defence Force and were originally called the Reconnaissance Regiments. "South African Special Forces: Salary, World Rating, Weapons, Quick Facts", published by the website BuzzSouthAfrica. As the BuzzSouthAfrica article states, capabilities for a special forces unit was established in 1968. However, the actual unit was not created until 1972. According to the South African History website, legislation was passed in 1912 that allowed for the development for a special forces unit. The unit is still intact today. The creation of the Reconnaissance Commando was created in Outdshoorn, South Africa. The unit currently operates out of Durban, South Africa. The Reconnaissance Commando was formed in order to increase the strength of the South African military. This unit makes soldiers with very specialized and rare skills that make them an extremely valuable asset to South Africa's military.

== Leadership ==
1 Reconnaissance Commando
From	Commanding Officers	To	Ribbon
1972	Cmdt Jan Breytenbach DVR,SD,SM,MMM	1975	Van Riebeeck Decoration DVR Southern Cross Decoration SD Southern Cross Medal SM Military Merit Medal MMM
1975	Maj J. C. Swart (Note: Temporary Commandant)	1981	
1981	Col. E. Olckers	1983	
1983	Col. A. Bestbier	1988	
1988	Col. G. Keulder	n.d.	
From	Regimental Sergeant's Major	To	Ribbon
	No known incumbents		

The South African Special Forces Association website shed a light onto the leader of the Reconnaissance Commando and the 11 men who first served in the unit. Commander JD Breytenbach led these men and pioneered a standard of training and professionalism that the SASF has followed since. A Special Forces unit was created by two Generals who pushed for permission to create it. Once they were given the go-ahead, the Generals appointed 12 troopers to the unit and began training them.
