= Jan Breytenbach =

South African military officer (1932–2024)

Jan Breytenbach DVR SD SM MMM
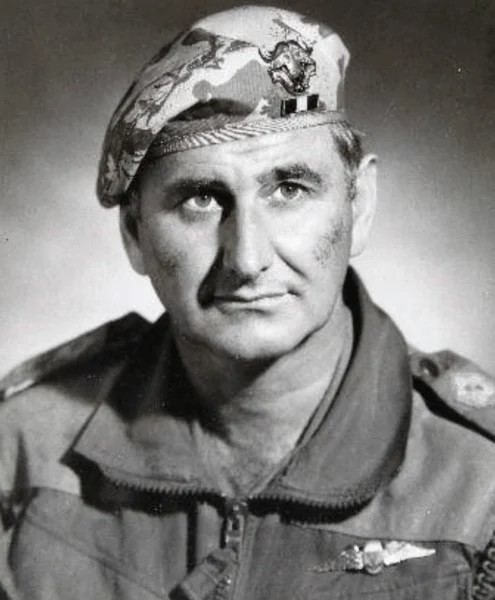
- Colonel Jan Breytenbach
- Born: 14 July 1932; South Africa
- Died: 16 June 2024 (aged 91); George, South Africa
- Military career
- Allegiance: South Africa; United Kingdom
- Service years: 1950–1955 South African Army; 1955–1961 Royal Navy; 1961–1987 South African Army
- Rank: Colonel
- Unit: 1 Parachute Battalion
- Commands: 1 Reconnaissance Commando; 32 Battalion; 44 Parachute Brigade
- Conflicts: Suez Crisis; Biafran War; South African Border War; Angolan Civil War; Bophutatswana crisis
- Awards: Van Riebeeck Decoration DVR Southern Cross Decoration SD Southern Cross Medal SM Military Merit Medal MMM Pro Patria Medal (South Africa) Southern Africa Medal General Service Medal (South Africa) Good Service Medal Naval General Service Medal (1915)
- Other work: Author

Jan Dirk Breytenbach DVR SD SM MMM (14 July 1932 – 16 June 2024) was a South African Special Forces military officer and author of military books. He is best known as the first commander of 1 Reconnaissance Commando, South Africa's first special forces unit. In his long career, he served in the Suez Crisis, the Biafran War, the South African Border War, and the Angolan Civil War, and attained the rank of colonel before his retirement. He died on 16 June 2024, at the age of 91.

== Military career ==
Breytenbach attended the Army Gymnasium in 1950, and was awarded the Sword of Peace in 1953 and joined the Royal Navy Fleet Air Arm after serving in the Armoured Corps and saw service in the Suez Crisis in 1956. He rejoined the South African Defence Force in 1961 and soon after completed one of 1 Parachute Battalion's courses. Fritz Loots commissioned him to organise 1 Reconnaissance Commando in 1971.

In 1975 Breytenbach led Operation Savannah, the South African Defence Force (SADF) covert intervention in the Angolan Civil War. The remnants of this group became the elite 32 Battalion, or "Buffalo Battalion".

He attended Staff College in 1977 and was promoted to colonel. In 1978, he led the SADF air assault on Cassinga, and would later continue for long contest opposing versions of the event in the press.

He became senior staff officer for operations at Northern Transvaal Command and commanded 44 Parachute Brigade from 24 September 1980 to 31 December 1982. He founded the SADF guerrilla school, which he commanded until his retirement.

Breytenbach retired from the military in 1987, and has written a number of books since then. At the time of his death in June 2024, the George Herald described Jan Breytenbach as "one of the greatest soldiers of our time."

== Personal life and death ==
He is the brother of South African poet and writer Breyten Breytenbach and of war correspondent/photographer Cloete Breytenbach. Cloete, who took an iconic photograph of Nelson Mandela and Walter Sisulu on Robben Island in July 1964 after being given permission to do so by then-South African Prime Minister John Vorster, died in 2019. Breyten and Jan Breytenbach held strongly opposing political viewpoints, as his brother opted for a left-wing approach.

Breytenbach was married to his wife Rosalind, and they had two children together.

Breytenbach died in the George Mediclinic in George, South Africa on 16 June 2024.

== Awards and decorations ==
- Van Riebeeck Decoration (DVR)
- Southern Cross Decoration (SD)
- Southern Cross Medal (1975) (SM)
- Military Merit Medal (MMM)
- Pro Patria Medal (South Africa) (with Cunene Clasp) (Note: Only the Cunene clasp was awarded, to members who served in Angola during Operation Savannah in 1975 and 1976. Recipients of the clasp wear a button, with the letter C encircled by a wreath, on the ribbon bar.)
- Southern Africa Medal
- General Service Medal (South Africa)
- Good Service Medal (Gold (30 Years))
- Good Service Medal (Silver (20 Years))
- Good Service Medal (Bronze (10 Years))
- Naval General Service Medal (1915) (Great Britain)

== Books by Jan Breytenbach ==
- Breytenbach, Jan (1986). Forged in battle. Saayman & Weber. ISBN 0-7971-0025-3.
- Breytenbach, Jan (1990). They live by the sword. Lemur. ISBN 0-620-14870-5.
- Breytenbach, Jan (1997). Eden's exiles, one soldier's fight for paradise. Queillerie. ISBN 1-874901-24-4.
- Breytenbach, Jan (2001). The plunderers. Covos Day. ISBN 1-919874-01-1.
- Breytenbach, Jan (2002). The Buffalo Soldiers, the story of South Africa's 32-Battalion, 1975–1993. Galago. ISBN 1-919854-07-X.
- Breytenbach, Jan (2008). Eagle Strike: The Story of the controversial airborne assault on Cassinga 1978. Manie Grove Publishing. ISBN 978-0-620-40614-7.
- Breytenbach, Jan (2011). The Tempered Sword: Forged in battle revisited; Operation Savannah and the birth of 32Bn. South Africa: Manie Grove Publishing. ISBN 978-0-620-500470.

== See also ==
- 32 Battalion (Book)
- 32 Battalion (South Africa)
- South African Border War

== Notes ==
Military offices
Preceded by Brig Mike du Plessis	OC 44 Parachute Brigade; 1980–1982	Succeeded by Col Frank Bestbier
New title Established	OC 32 Battalion; 1975–1977	Succeeded by Col Gert Nel
