= 16 Squadron SAAF =

Attack helicopter squadron of the South African Air Force

16 Squadron
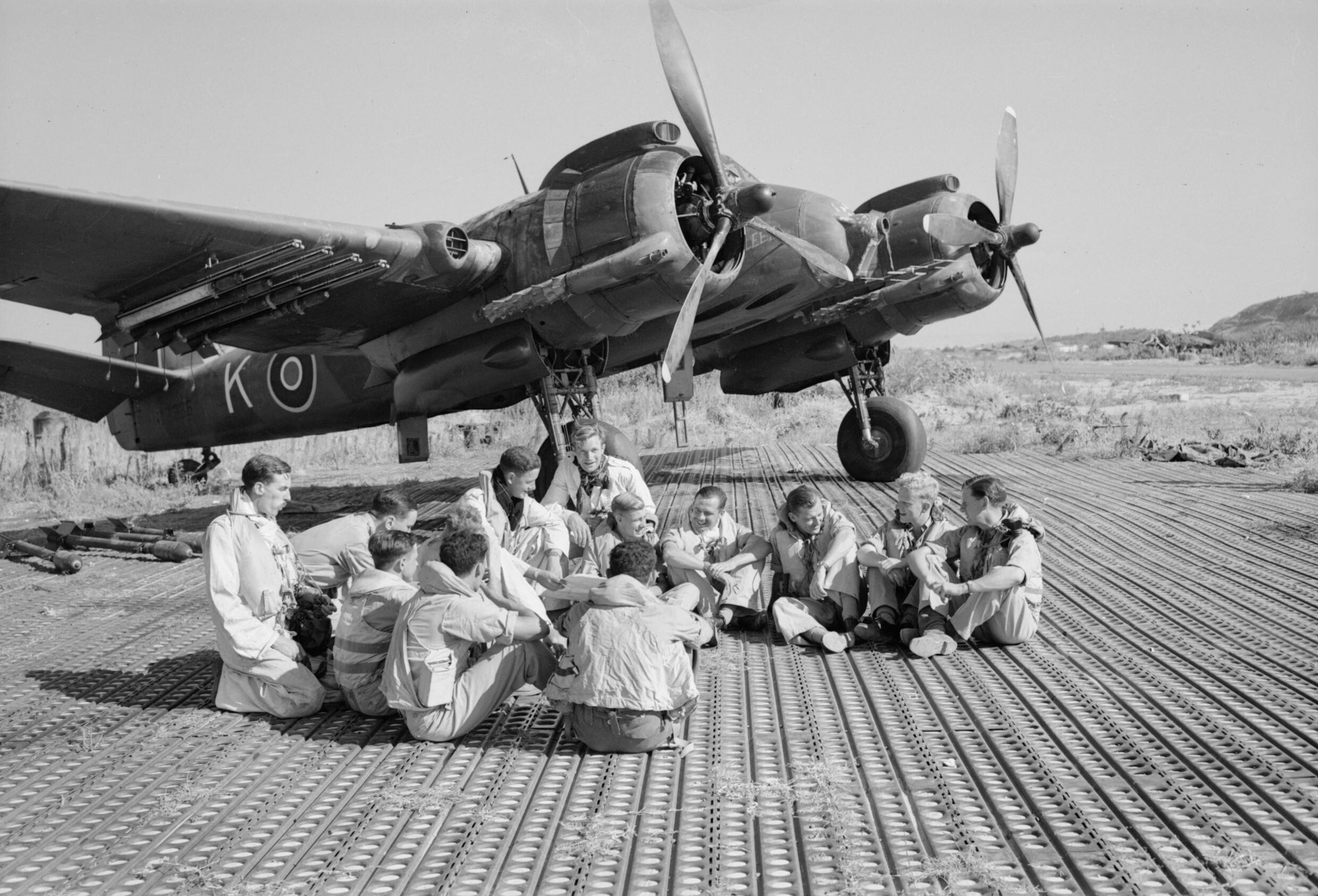
- Aircrew of 16 Squadron SAAF and No. 227 Squadron RAF in front of Bristol Beaufighter near Biferno, Italy
- Active: 14 September 1939–present
- Country: South Africa
- Branch: South African Air Force
- Role: Attack Helicopter Squadron
- Garrison/HQ: AFB Bloemspruit
- Motto(s): "Hlaselani" (Attack)
- Equipment: Denel Rooivalk
- Engagements: Madagascar 1942, East Africa 1941 and 1943, Egypt 1943–45, SWA/Angola 1979–89

Commanders
- Current commander: Col. M.P Ramoipone

Insignia
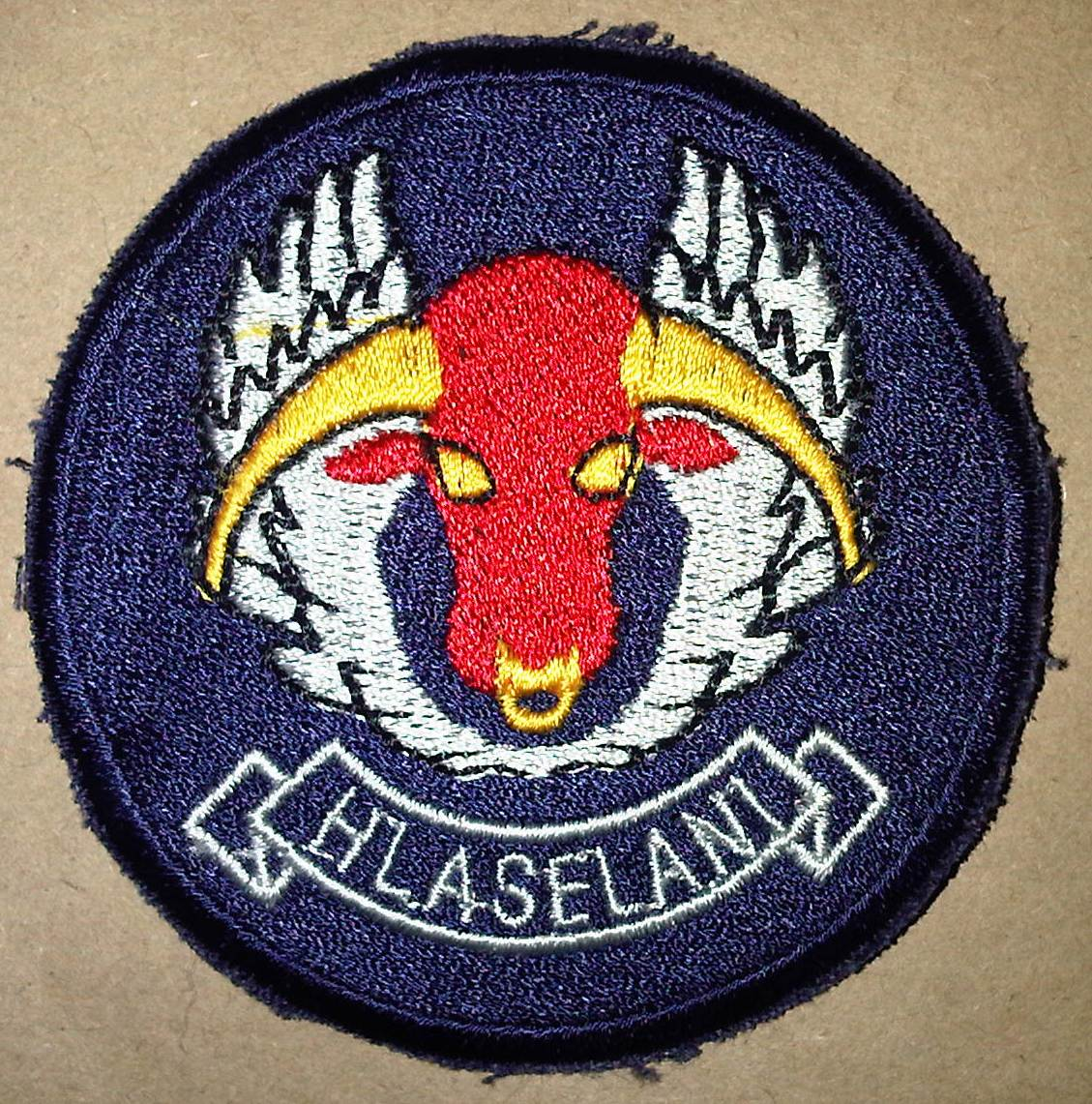
- 16 Sqn badge

16 Squadron SAAF is an attack helicopter squadron of the South African Air Force (SAAF). It was originally formed in World War II as a maritime patrol squadron, however, over the course of the war it was disbanded and reformed a number of times, operating a number of different types of aircraft. It was finally disbanded in June 1945 and was not re-raised until 1968 as a helicopter squadron. In the late 1980s the squadron took part in the conflict in Angola before being disbanded again in 1990. It was raised once more in 1999 and it is currently operating the Rooivalk attack helicopter.

== History ==
The squadron was formed on 18 September 1939 as a Coastal Command squadron based at Walvis Bay (station), equipped with three ex-South African Airways Junkers Ju 86Z aircraft in the role of a maritime patrol squadron. However, it was short-lived, and by December of that year it had become B Flight of 32 Squadron.

The squadron was re-formed at Addis Ababa on 1 May 1941, flying eight Ju-86Z taken over from 12 Squadron plus two Martin Marylands. It was disbanded that August following the Italian surrender.

The third chapter of the squadron's World War II history began when 20 Squadron, equipped with Martin Maryland and Bristol Beaufort aircraft and taking part in the invasion of Madagascar, was renumbered. Following the successful invasion of Madagascar, the squadron moved to Kenya, where it was equipped with the Bristol Blenheim V for use in the maritime patrol role, thus returning to its original purpose.

In April 1943 the squadron moved to Egypt, and was equipped with Bristol Beaufighters for use in anti-submarine duties. It continued to perform this role until it was again disbanded on 15 June 1945.

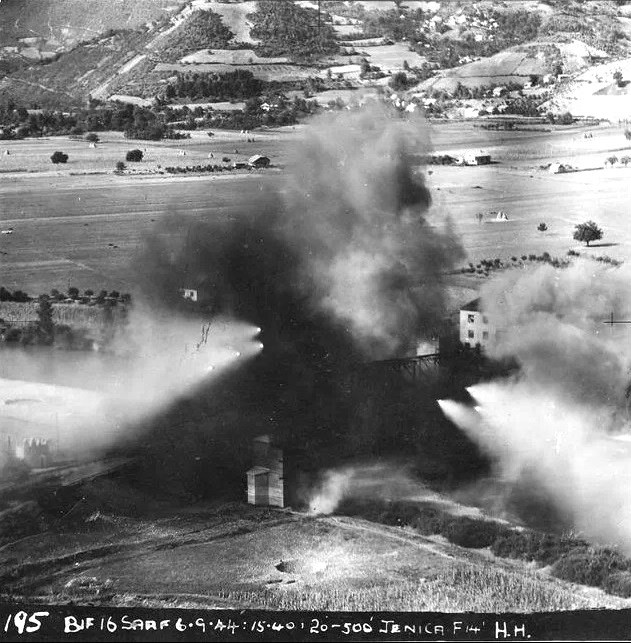
On 6 September 1944 16th SAAF Squadron bombed, among other Zenica places, Zenica bridge "Pehare", during Balkans campaign led from Italy

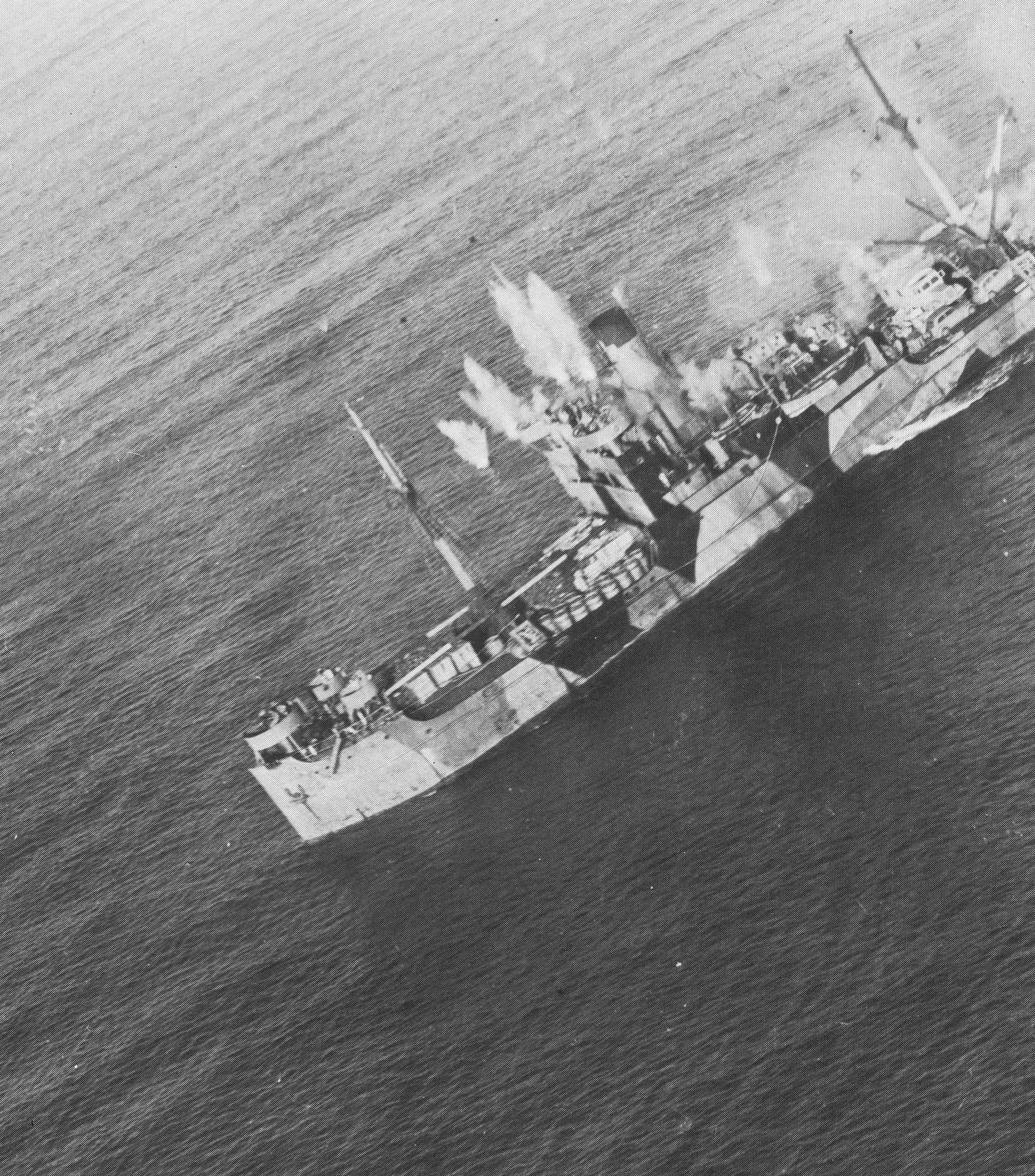
German transport strafed by 16 Sqn SAAF Beaufighters Med 1942

16th SAAF Squadron, stationed in then Italy, made dozens of air strikes against German forces and collaborators in then Croatia, Serbia, Slovenia, Bosnia and Herzegovina, etc. during 1944 and 1945. On 6 September 1944, the 16th Squadron bombed Zenica, focusing on bridges.

It would be 23 years before the squadron was once again re-formed, this time at AFB Ysterplaat on 1 February 1968, and equipped with the Aérospatiale Alouette III. A year later it moved to AFB Durban, though did not stay long, and finally moved to AFB Bloemspruit during 1972. The squadron's A Flight was transferred to AFS Port Elizabeth in 1973, with its B Flight moving first to AFB Ysterplaat, and then to AFS Port Elizabeth in 1980 to join A Flight.

In 1986, the squadron received an additional type, the Aérospatiale SA 330 Puma. Throughout this period the squadron played a vital role in the South-West Africa/Angola Border War, and following the cessation of hostilities was disbanded in October 1990.

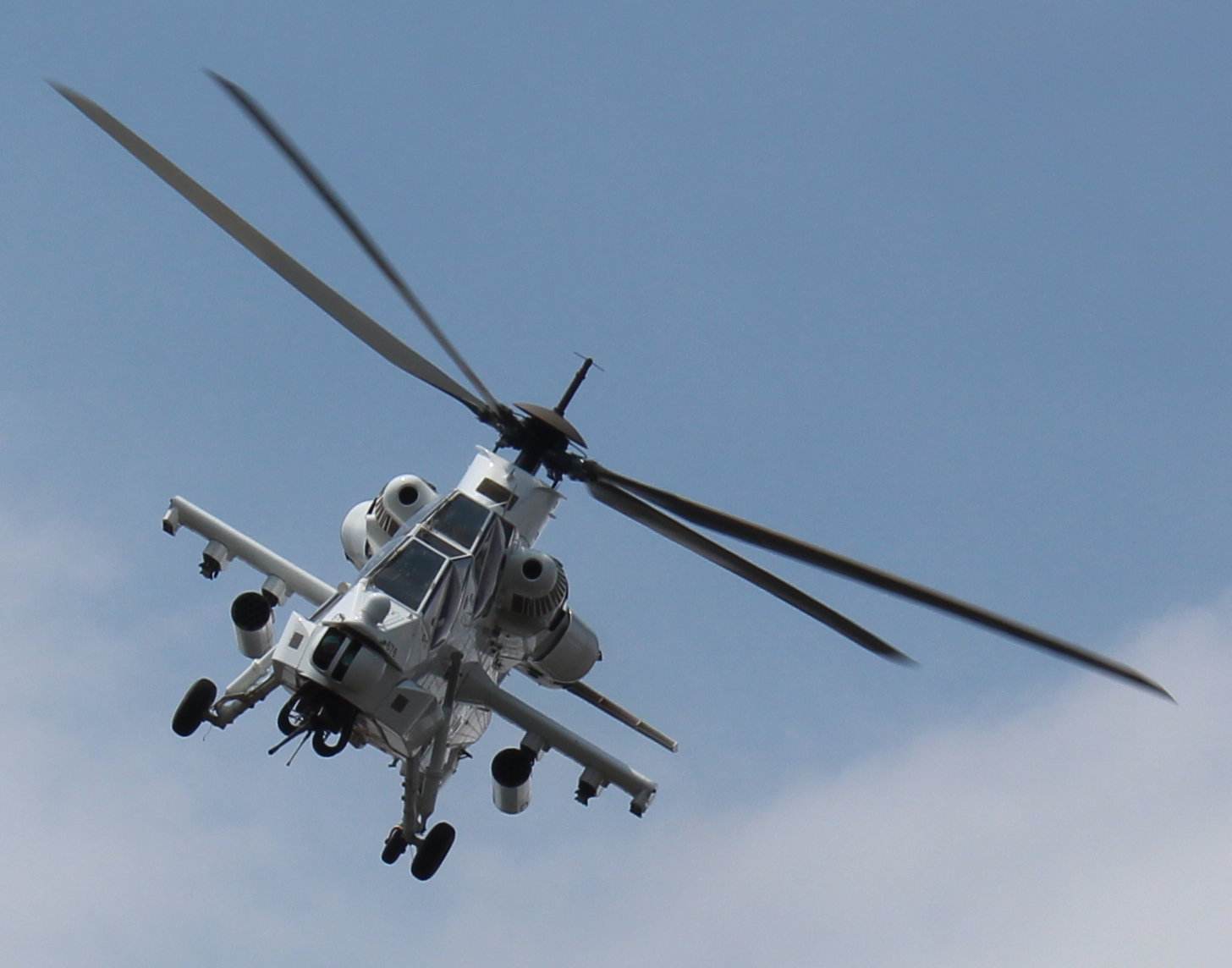
South African Rooivalk Attack Helicopter over FIB base in Sake 2014

The latest chapter in 16 Squadron's history began on 28 October 1999 when it was reformed at AFB Bloemspruit and equipped with the new Denel Rooivalk attack helicopter, receiving all 12 ordered. Due to the complexities of integrating a new type and the creation and modification of tactics for the use of the SAAF's first attack helicopter, the squadron was only expected to reach complete operational readiness in 2008. It is however still a functioning squadron, and regularly carries out joint exercises with the South African Army and other elements of the Air Force.

The Rooivalk saw its first combat in support of the United Nations Force Intervention Brigade in the Democratic Republic of the Congo during 2013.

== Previous aircraft operated ==
- Junkers Ju 86Z
- Martin Maryland
- Bristol Beaufort
- Bristol Blenheim V
- Bristol Beaufighter
- Aérospatiale Alouette III
- Aérospatiale SA 330 Puma
