= 19 Squadron SAAF =

Squadron of the South African Air Force

19 Squadron
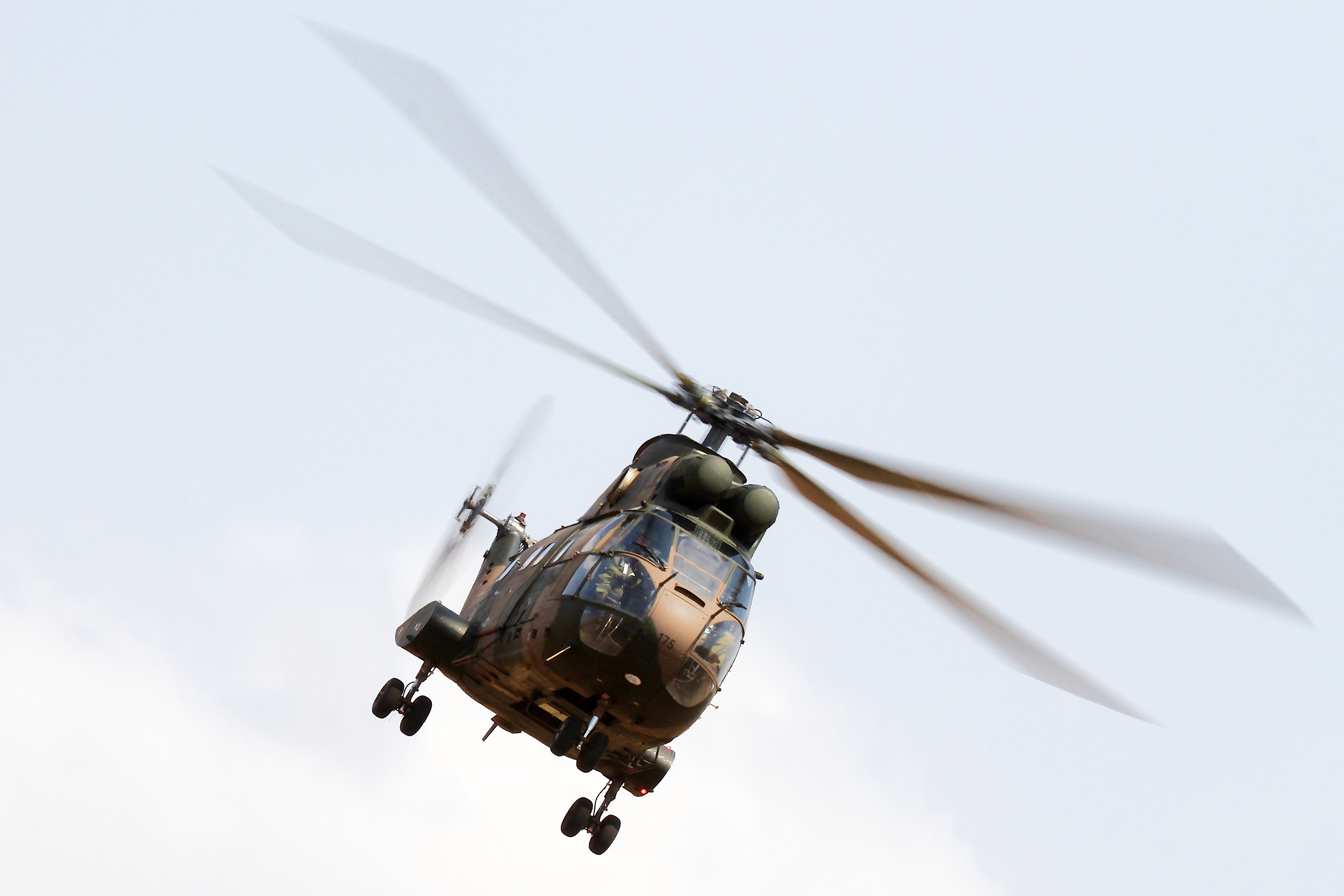
- SAAF Aérospatiale SA 330 Puma (similar to that flown by the squadron)
- Active: Sep - Dec 1939; 12 August 1944 – 10 July 1945; 1 March 1970–present
- Country: South Africa
- Branch: South African Air Force
- Role: Transport / Utility Helicopter Squadron
- Garrison/HQ: AFB Hoedspruit, Hoedspruit
- Motto: Fama Ex Factis Fame through Deeds

Insignia
- Squadron Insignia

19 Squadron SAAF is a current squadron of the South African Air Force operating as a transport/utility helicopter squadron. It was formed in 1939 as part of the Air Force airways Wing, flying transport aircraft but was disbanded after a few months. It was re-formed from No. 227 Squadron RAF in 1944 and disbanded again after the end of World War II. It was again re-established in 1970 as a helicopter squadron – a role which it still performs today.

== History ==
19 Squadron was formed on 1 September 1939 together with 17 Squadron. It formed part of the Airways Wing at Swartkop Air Station flying ex-South African Airways Junkers Ju 52/3m's but was disbanded on 1 December the same year. The squadron did not participate in the Second World War until 12 August 1944 when 227 Squadron RAF was renumbered as 19 Squadron SAAF at Biferno in Italy. The squadron was deployed flying Beaufighters and was involved in operations in Italy, Greece and Yugoslavia until it was disbanded on 10 July 1945 after the end of the war.

On 1 March 1970 a Flight of 17 Squadron was transformed into 19 Squadron and equipped with SA330 Pumas at AFB Swartkop with A Flight flying from Swartkop and B Flight operating from AFB Durban for a period of time. "A" Flight was moved to AFB Louis Trichardt on 1 January 1991, with the rest of the squadron moving on 1 January 1992 flying Aérospatiale Alouette III's. The squadron moved to AFB Hoedspruit on 1 January 2004 where it is currently based. 19 Squadron became the first squadron to be equipped with the Oryx helicopter in early 1994.

== Aircraft ==
Aircraft flown by 19 Squadron
Note: Aircraft type photographs may not necessarily represent aircraft of the same mark or actual aircraft belonging to the squadron.
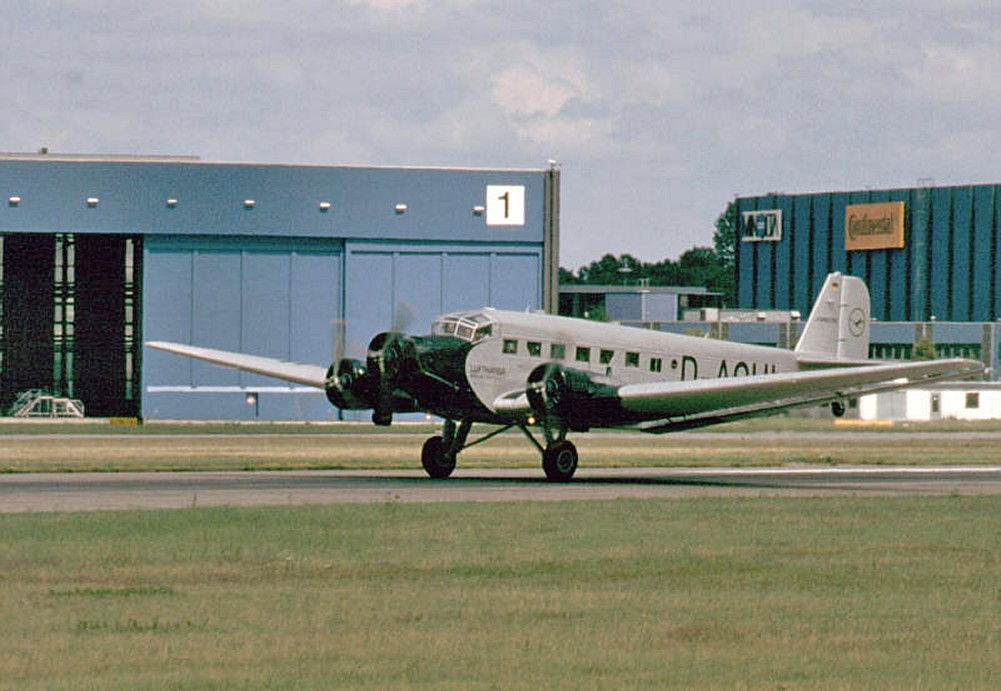
Junkers Ju 52
1939

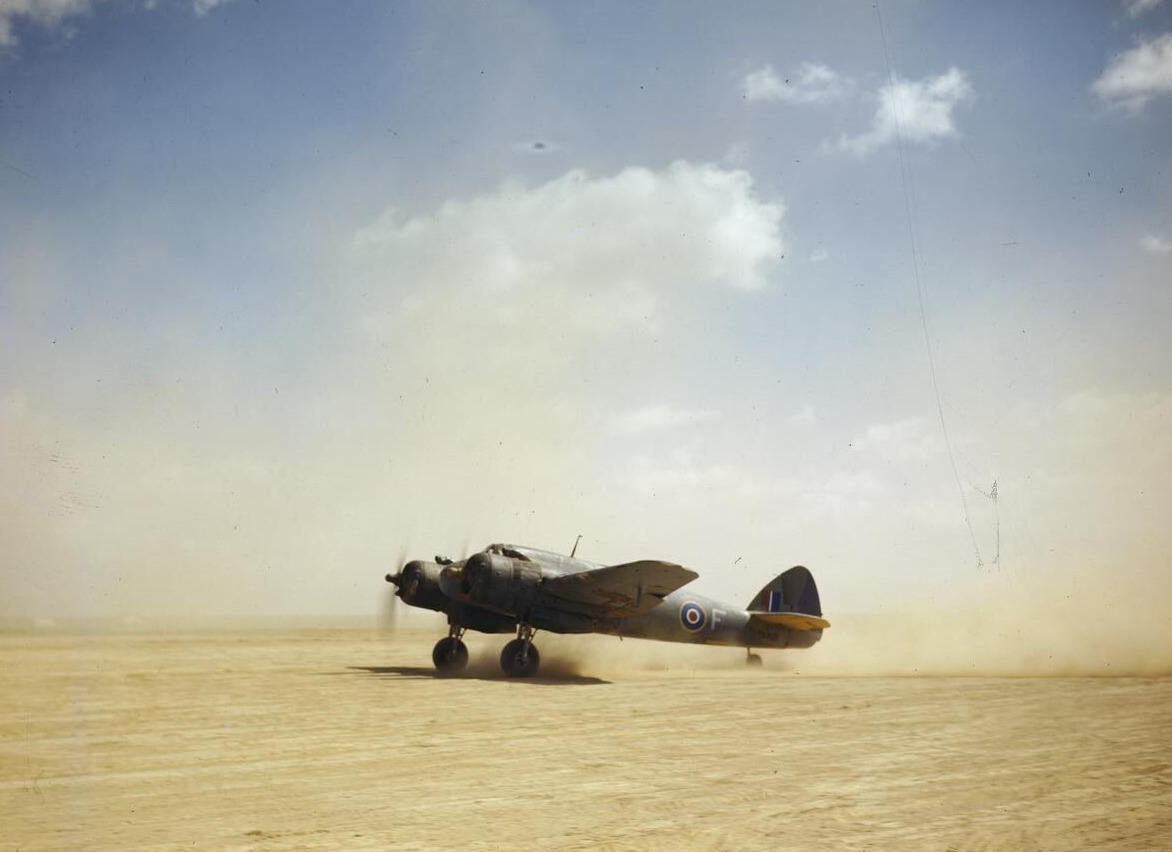
Bristol Beaufighter
1944

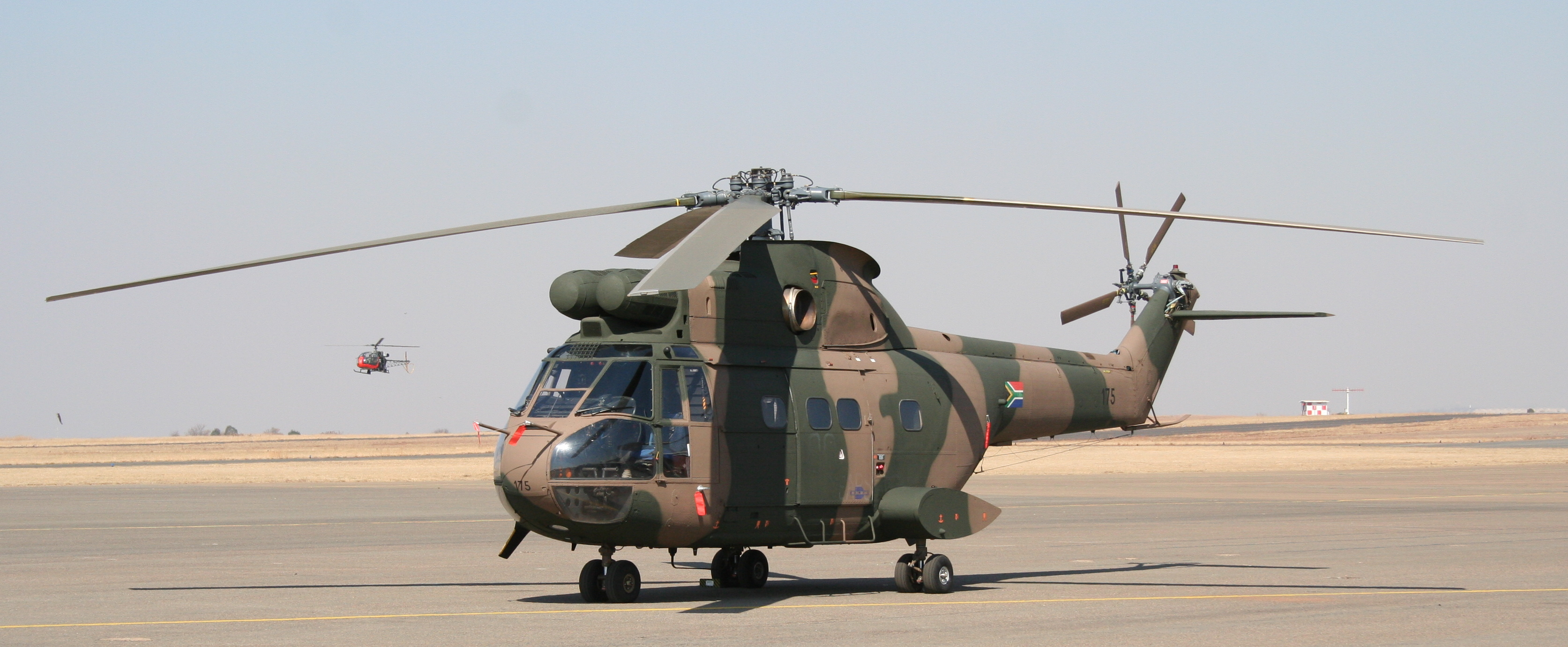
SA330 Puma
1970

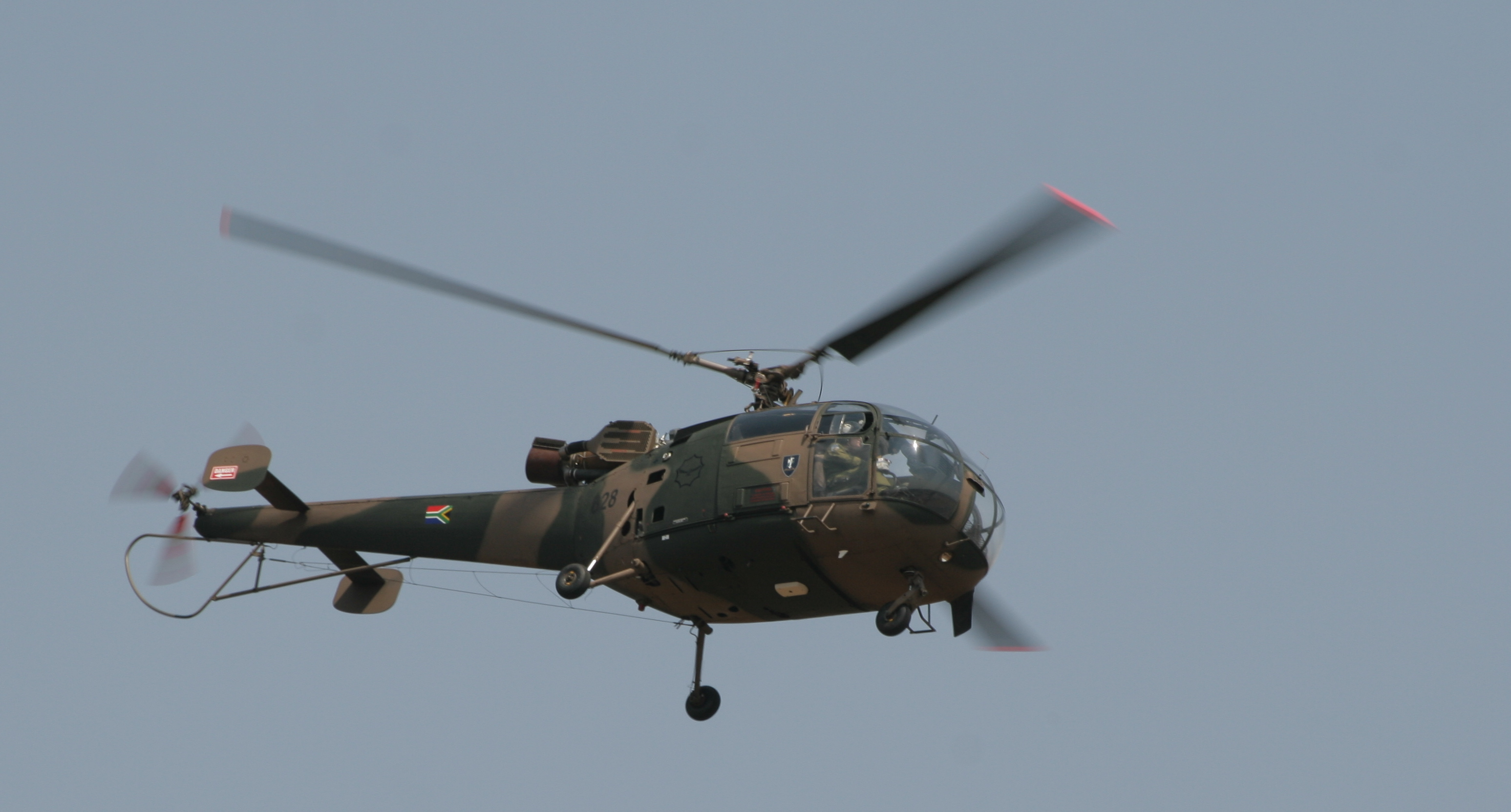
Alouette III
1992

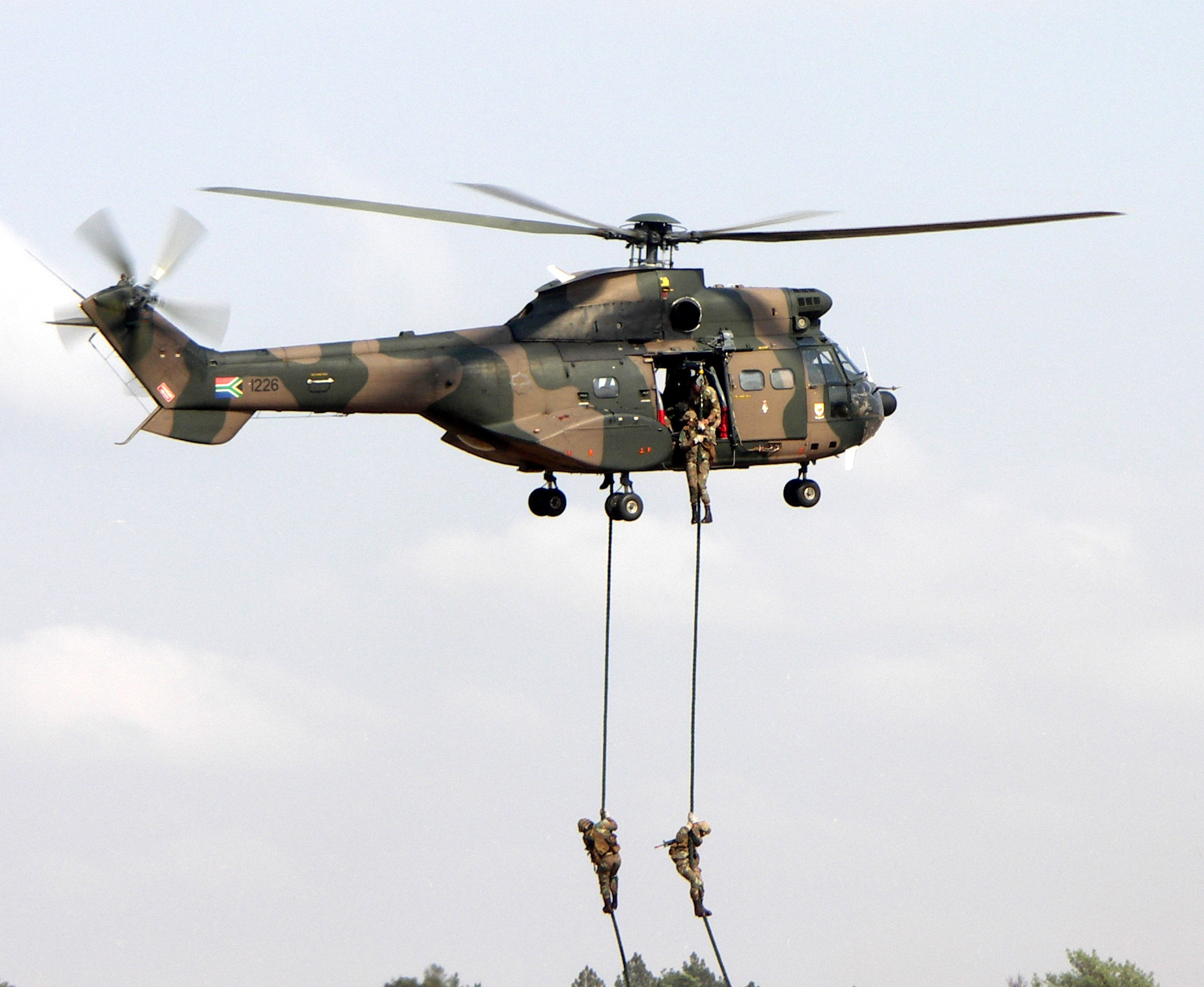
SA-330 Oryx
1994
