= 17 Squadron SAAF =

17 Squadron
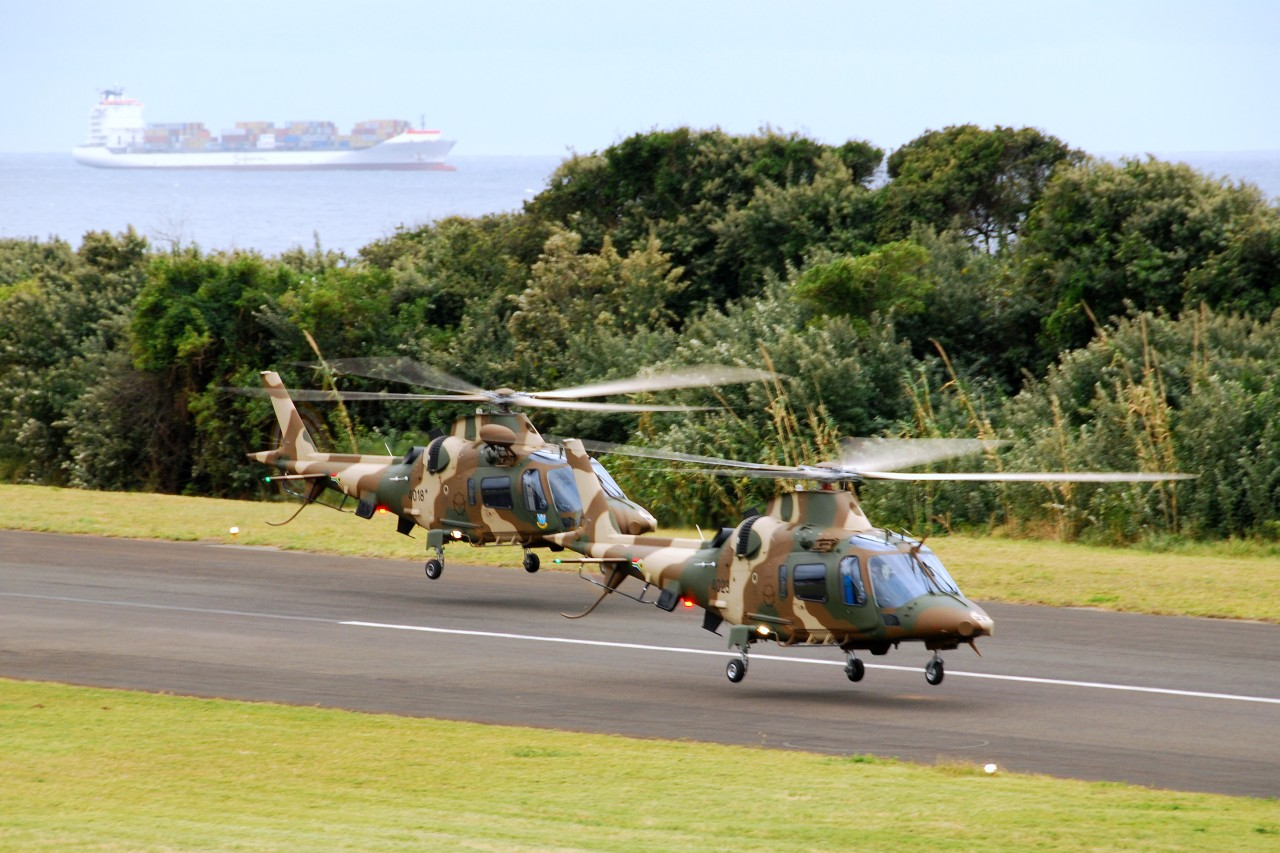
- SAAF Agusta 109
- Active: 1939–present
- Country: South Africa
- Branch: South African Air Force
- Role: Helicopter transport / utility sqn
- Garrison/HQ: AFB Swartkop
- Motto(s): Pro Re Nata (For the occasion as it arises)
- Equipment: Atlas Oryx, Agusta A109LUH

Insignia
- 17 Squadron Insignia

17 Squadron SAAF is a squadron of the South African Air Force. It is currently a transport/utility helicopter squadron.

- First formed: 1 September 1939
- Historic aircraft flown: Junkers Ju 52/3m, Blenheim V, Lockheed Ventura GR V, Vickers Wellington, Vickers Warwick GR V, Harvard, Sikorsky S-55, Sikorsky S-51, Sud Aviation Alouette II, Aérospatiale Alouette III, Aérospatiale Puma, SA 365N Dauphin
- Current aircraft flown: Atlas Oryx, Agusta A109LUH
- Current base: AFB Swartkop, Pretoria.
