= South African Air Force squadron identification codes =

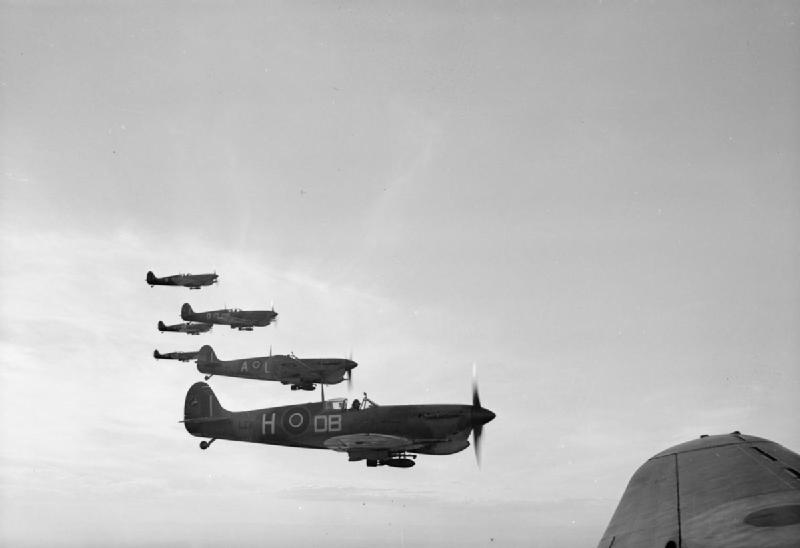
Supermarine Spitfires with squadron code DB, denoting 2 Squadron SAAF

The South African Air Force (SAAF) adopted the use of squadron codes from the Royal Air Force (RAF) during the Second World War.

The SAAF continued to use these codes after the war, with the final use of the wartime code system on a 22 Squadron PV-1 Ventura in 1960.

Aircraft deployed for the East African Campaign did not carry any squadron codes—these were first introduced when the SAAF deployed to North Africa in 1942. Squadron codes were assigned by the RAF from a theater annex to SD110. Aircraft used in South Africa did not carry squadron codes, except for aircraft of the 11 OTU which carried the squadron codes of their parent squadrons (1 and 2 Squadron SAAF).

Historically, the codes were usually two alphabetic characters, painted on the rear fuselage next to the roundel. These formed a suffix or prefix to the call sign of each aircraft (on the other side of the roundel) which was usually a single letter (e. g. "G for George"). In general, when an aircraft was lost or withdrawn from use, its call sign was applied to its replacement or another aircraft.

== World War II ==
Code	Squadron	Type	Period From	Period To	Theater	Notes
AX	1 Squadron	Hurricane Mk I	April 1942	November 1942	Mediterranean / Middle East	
AX	1 Squadron	Hurricane Mk IIc	September 1942	November 1942	Mediterranean / Middle East	
AX	1 Squadron	Spitfire Mk Vc	November 1942	April 1943	Mediterranean / Middle East	
AX	1 Squadron	Spitfire Mk VIII	August 1943	June 1945	Mediterranean / Middle East	
AX	1 Squadron	Spitfire Mk IX	c August 1943	October 1943	Mediterranean / Middle East	
AX	11 Operational Training Unit	Hurricane Mk II	1943	1944	South Africa: Training	A Flight 11 OCTU: "AX" on a square yellow background
DB	2 Squadron	Kittyhawk Mk I, Ia	April 1942	June 1943	Mediterranean / Middle East	Maj. D.B. Hauptfleisch (OC 2 Sqn) flew Kittyhawk Mk. I with personal code DBH 1942–1943
DB	2 Squadron	Kittyhawk Mk III	June 1943	Junly 1943	Mediterranean / Middle East	
DB	2 Squadron	Spitfire Mk Vc	June 1943	March 1944	Mediterranean / Middle East	
DB	2 Squadron	Spitfire Mk IX	February 1944	July 1945	Mediterranean / Middle East	
DHL			1943	1944	Italy	Personal code of Col. D.H. Loftus, OC 7 Wing SAAF, Kittyhawk
DT			1943	1944	Italy	Personal code of Maj. S.F. du Toit, 7 Wing SAAF, Spitfire Mk. VIII
DT			1945	1945	Italy	Personal code of Lt. Col. S.F. du Toit, OC 8 Wing SAAF, Spitfire Mk. VIII
CA	3 Squadron	Spitfire Mk IX	February 1944	October 1945	Mediterranean / Middle East	Maj. C.A. Golding (OC 3 Sqn) flew Spitfire IX with personal code CAG 1944-1945
DX	4 Squadron	Tomahawk Mk. II	Feb 1942	Jun 1942	Mediterranean / Middle East	
KJ	4 Squadron	Tomahawk Mk. IIb	c Nov 1941	Jan 1942	Mediterranean / Middle East	
KJ	4 Squadron	Kittyhawk Mk's I, Ia, III	Jun 1941	Jul 1943	Mediterranean / Middle East	
KJ	4 Squadron	Spitfire Mk. V	Jul 1943	May 1944	Italy	
KJ	4 Squadron	Spitfire Mk. IX	May 1944	Jul 1945	Italy	
KK	31 Squadron	B-24 Liberator	1944	1945	Italy	
GL	5 Squadron	Tomahawk Mk II	Oct 1941	Jan 1943	Mediterranean / Middle East	
GL	5 Squadron	Kittyhawk Mk Ia	1943	1943	Mediterranean / Middle East	
GL	5 Squadron	Kittyhawk Mk III, Mk IV	Jan 1943	Sep 1944	Italy	
GL	5 Squadron	Mustang Mk III, Mk IV	Sep 1944	Oct 1945	Italy	
GL	11 Operational Training Unit	Hurricane Mk. II	1943	1945	South Africa: Training	B Flight
JEP			1945	1945	Italy	Personal code of Maj. J.E. Pearson, 8 Wing SAAF, Spitfire Mk. IX
JH			1945	1945	Italy	Personal code of Lt. Col. J Human, OC 7 Wing SAAF, Spitfire Mk. IX
ND	11 Squadron	Kittyhawk Mk. IV	Oct 1944	Aug 1945	Italy	
ND	11 Squadron	Spitfire Mk. IX	Aug 1945	Oct 1945	Italy	
OZ	24 Squadron	Boston Mk. III	1941	1942	Mediterranean / Middle East	
P	12 Squadron	Douglas Boston III	March 1942	December 1943	Mediterranean / Middle East	
P	25 Squadron	Martin Marauder III	October 1944	July 1945	Mediterranean / Italy	
?	26 Squadron	Vickers Wellington Mk X & XI	May 1943	May 1945	West Africa / Gold Coast(Ghana)	
A	12 Squadron	Martin Maryland II	January 1944	December 1944	Mediterranean / Italy	
V	12 Squadron	Martin Maryland III	August 1945	November 1945	Mediterranean / Italy	
B	30 Squadron	Martin Marauder III	August 1944	September 1945	Mediterranean / Italy	
TA	2 Squadron	Tomahawk Mk. II	1941	1942	Mediterranean / Middle East	
TJ	7 Squadron	Spitfire Mk. IX	1944	1945	Mediterranean / Middle East	
VL	12 Squadron	Boston Mk. III	1942	1942	Mediterranean / Middle East	
WR	40 Squadron	Hurricane Mk's. I, II	Jan 1942	Aug 1942	Mediterranean / Middle East	
WR	40 Squadron	Spitfire Mk. V	Feb 1943	Jun 1943	Mediterranean / Middle East	Lt Col R.R. Rogers, OC 40 Sqn flew with personal serial code RR, 1943, Spitfire Mk. IX
WR	40 Squadron	Spitfire Mk. IX	Jun 1943	Oct 1945	Italy	Maj T. Cook, OC 40 Sqn flew with personal serial code TC, 1944, Spitfire Mk. IX
ZP	15 Squadron	Blenheim Mk. V	1942	1943	Mediterranean / Middle East	

== Post war use of wartime code system ==
Code	Squadron	Type	Period From	Period To	Theater	Notes
DHL			1946	1946	South Africa	Personal code of Col. D.H. Loftus, OC 7 Wing SAAF Spitfire Mk. VIII
AX	1 Squadron	Spitfire LF.9	1946	1949	South Africa	
AX	1 Squadron	Vampire FB.5	1949	1951	South Africa	
DB	2 Squadron	Spitfire LF.9	1946	1948	South Africa	
JS	60 Squadron	Dakota Mk. III, IV	1946	1950	South Africa	
JS	60 Squadron	Spitfire LF.9 (PR)	1946	1950	South Africa	
JS	60 Squadron	Ventura Mk. II	1946	1950	South Africa	
JS	60 Squadron	Mosquito PR 16	1946	1950	South Africa	
LB	21 Squadron	Ventura Mk. II	1947	1951	South Africa	
MS	17 Squadron	Ventura Mk. V	1947	1958	South Africa	
MT	22 Squadron	Ventura Mk. V	1954	1960	South Africa	
OD	28 Squadron	Dakota Mk. III, IV	1946	1955	South Africa	
OP	42 Squadron	Auster AOPS	1953	1957	South Africa	
OZ	24 Squadron	Ventura II	1948	1948	South Africa	
PH	27 Squadron				South Africa	Code allocated but not used.
RB	35 Squadron	Sunderland GR.5	1945	1947	South Africa	
RB	35 Squadron	Anson floatplane	1946	1946	South Africa	
ST	25 Squadron				South Africa	Code allocated but not used.
VL	12 Squadron	Anson	1946	1950	South Africa	
