= 32 Squadron SAAF =

32 Squadron
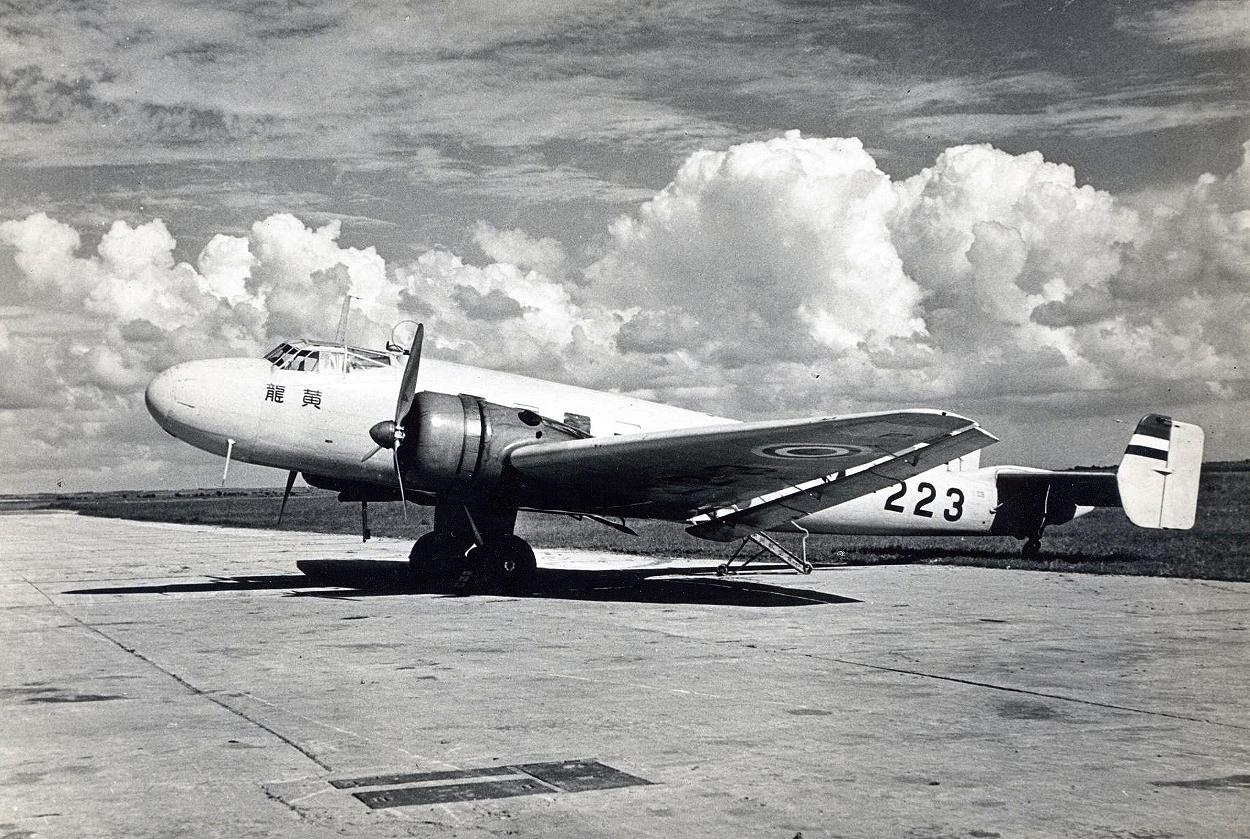
- Junkers Ju-86 - similar to the aircraft taken over from the South African airways and operated by 32 Squadron
- Active: December 1939 - August 1940
- Country: (South Africa)
- Branch: South African Air Force
- Role: Coastal Patrol and Shipping Escort

Insignia
- 32 Squadron Insignia

32 Squadron was a short lived coastal patrol squadron of the South African Air Force during the Second World War. It was founded in December 1939 and assumed the responsibility for coastal patrols and anti-submarine escorts for shipping. The squadron never had many aircraft (highest total was seven Ju-86 and four Avro Ansons) and remained a small unit for the full duration of its short existence. It was disbanded in August 1940 when its Ju-86 aircraft were sent to Johannesburg to augment 12 Squadron who were deployed in East Africa.

== Aircraft ==
Aircraft flown by 32 Squadron
Note: Aircraft type photographs may not necessarily represent aircraft of the same mark or actual aircraft belonging to the squadron.
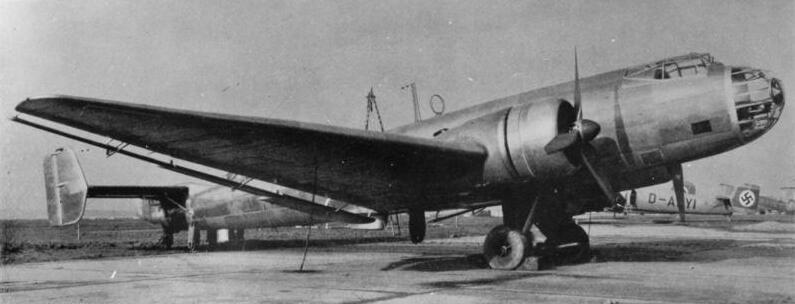
Junkers Ju-86
1939–1940

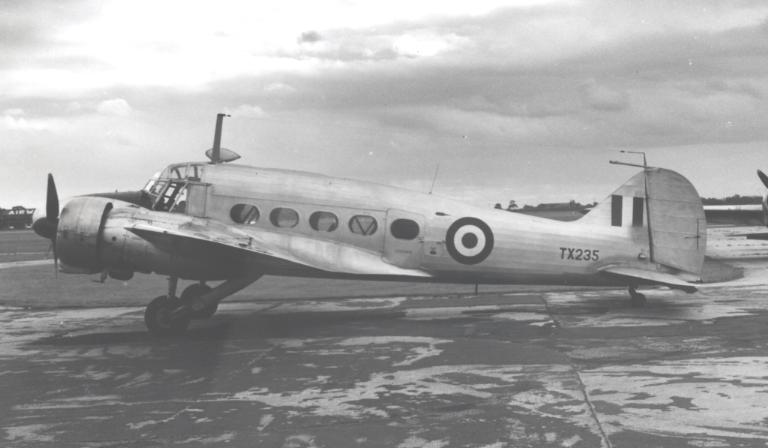
Avro Anson
1939-1940
