= Operation Placid =

- Part of the Rhodesian Bush War
| Date | 22 August 1979 |
| Location | Zambia 15°25′00″S 28°17′00″E |
| Result | Zimbabwe Rhodesian victory |

Belligerents
| Zimbabwe Rhodesia; South Africa | ZIPRA; Zambia |

Commanders and leaders
| (Zimbabwe Rhodesia) Abel Muzorewa | Unknown (Zambia) Unknown |

Units involved
| RhAF; SADF: (South Africa) SAAF; 12 Squadron | Zambian Air Force |

Strength
| Zimbabwe Rhodesia: 2 Hawker Hunters; 4 Canberras; South Africa: 3 Canberras | ZIPRA: Unknown; Zambia: 8 Shenyang J-6 |

Casualties and losses
| None | ZIPRA: heavy Zambia: none |
- Location within Zambia

Operation Placid was a Rhodesian military operation in Zambia with clandestine assistance from the South African Air Force (SAAF) during the Rhodesian Bush War. The Rhodesian Air Force planned raids against a ZIPRA camps in Zambia on the northern Rhodesian border.

== Operation ==
The operation consisted of two raids on ZIPRA camps on 22 August 1979. The South African Air Force provided three Canberra bombers (12 Squadron SAAF) with crew for the operation which would include Rhodesian Air Force Canberra's and Hawker Hunter fighters. The aircraft of Operation Placid I departed at 09h15 from Fylde airbase, the Canberra's armed with two 1000lb and nine 500lb bombs for the targets in Zambia. During the operation the Zambian Air Force launched Shenyang F-6 fighters to intercept the operation but failed to intercept the formation.

== Aftermath ==
Operation Placid II took place on the same day at 15h40 and re-attacked the morning targets and again the Zambian Air Force launched Shenyang F-6 fighters to intercept the operation but failed.
