= Battle of Kos =

Battle of Kos may refer to:

- Battle of Kos (1773), during the Russo-Turkish War (1768–1774)
- Battle of Kos (1943), during World War II
