= Battle of Kos (1943) =

1943 World War II battle

- Part of the Dodecanese campaign of World War II
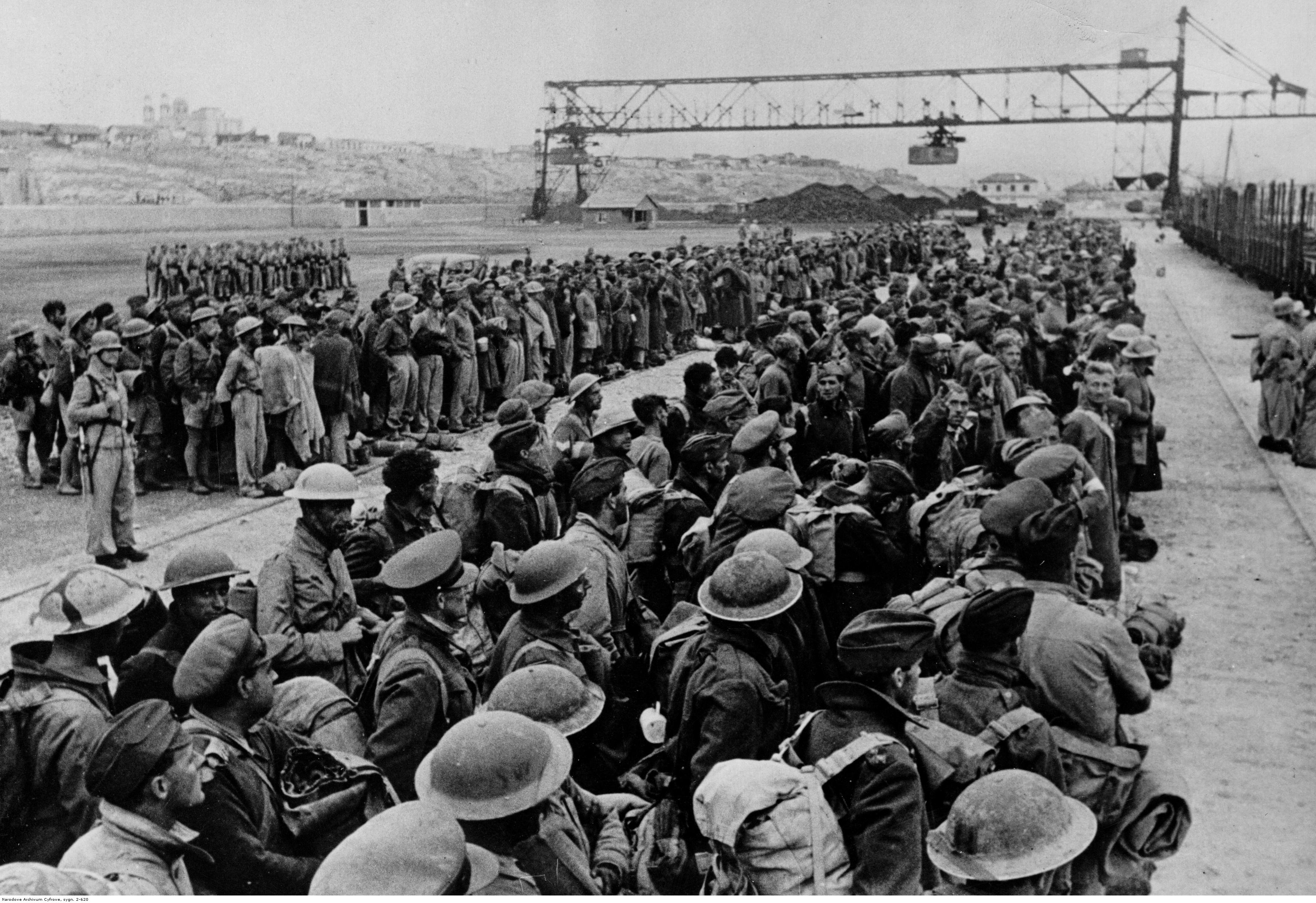
- British POWs taken in Kos
Date	3–4 October 1943
Location	Kos Island, Aegean Sea 36.7909°N 27.0712°E
Result	German victory
Territorial changes	German occupation of Kos

Belligerents
(Kingdom of Italy) Italy; United Kingdom; South Africa (air support)	Germany

Commanders and leaders
Felice Leggio (executed); Lionel Kenyon (POW)	Friedrich-Wilhelm Müller

Strength
c. 3,500 Italian; 1,388 British	4,000

Casualties and losses
3,145 Italian; 1,388 British POW; 103 Italian officers executed	15 dead; 70 wounded

The Battle of Kos (Greek: Μάχη της Κω) was a battle in the Second World War between British–Italian and German forces for control of the Greek island of Kos, in the Italian Dodecanese Islands of the Aegean Sea. The battle was precipitated by the Allied Armistice with Italy. German forces with strong air support quickly overwhelmed the Italian garrison and the recent British reinforcements, denying the Allies a base to attack the German presence in the Balkans and leading to the expulsion and death of most of the island's Jewish population.

== Background ==
=== Dodecanese archipelago ===
The Aegean Sea links the eastern Mediterranean to the Black Sea via the Bosphorus. The sea has many islands and two archipelagos, the cyclades in the south and the Dodecanese in the south-east, close to the Turkish mainland. There are fourteen notable islands in the Dodecanese Archipelago, Patmos, Lipsi, Leros, Kalymnos, Kos, Astypalaia, Nisyros, Tilos, Chalki, Symi, Rhodes, Karpathos, Kasos and Kastellorizo. Since the Italo-Turkish war of 1911 to 1912, the islands had been ruled by Italy.

=== Kos ===
Kos is an island that is 26.5 mi (42.6 km) long and 1 to 6.3 mi (1.6 to 10.1 km) wide. The south coast of the island is steep and hills from Cape Foca in the east, westwards to Pili and further on, Mt. Dicheo is the highest hill at 2,776 ft (846 m). The hills decline in height to the west end of the island. The steep southern slopes are rocky and the northern slopes, less steep, descend to pine forests and farmland. There are many sandy beaches and large salt flats at Lambi and Tingachi (now Tigaki). Kos town and port is at the east end of the island and a road runs from the town to Cefalo (now Kefalos) in the west. In September 1943, the c. 3,500 Italian infantry of the 10th Regiment, 50th Infantry Division Regina had four coastal guns, a few obsolescent anti-aircraft guns and its infantry was spread around the island, with little anti-aircraft protection. No defences had been dug, the sites of the four coastal guns were well chosen but the guns were old, in the open and lacked fire-control.

The Regia Aeronautica had detached the 396° Squadriglia, 154 Gruppo CT, to Kos in 1943, that in September had four serviceable fighters out of eight, two C.202s a CR.42 and a G.50, with two pilots. The island had plenty of food for the 20,000 Greek civilian inhabitants, the Italian and British troops and water was easily available in the towns and villages but lacking in the hinterland. Kos town had a sheltered harbour but the water was shallow, it lacked equipment and had only one berth. One of the Italian pilots took off in the CR.42 on 10 September and flew to Rhodes. Later that evening the remaining pilot spotted six Heinkel He 111 bombers and claimed one shot down. On 11 September, two German aircraft attacked Antimachia, destroyed two aircraft and damaged one.

=== Armistice of Cassibile ===
With the capitulation of Italy in September 1943, German forces in the Balkans and the Mediterranean moved to take over the Italian-held areas. At the same time, the Allies, under the instigation of the British Prime Minister, Winston Churchill, endeavoured to occupy the Dodecanese island chain. Churchill hoped to use them as a base against German positions in the Balkans and to pressure neutral Turkey into the war on the Allied side.

=== Fall of Rhodes ===
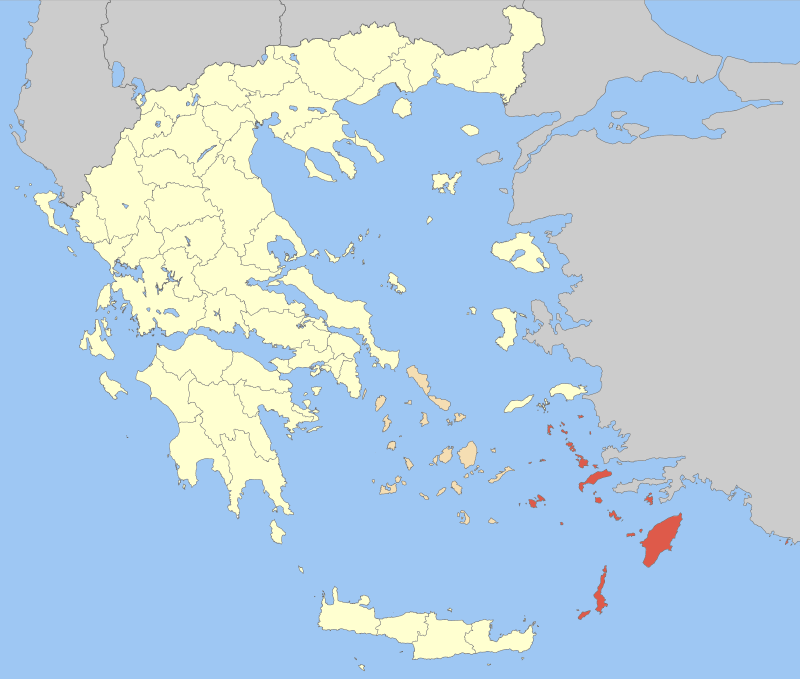
Locator map of Dodecanese prefecture in Greece

The main prize, the island of Rhodes, fell to a swift attack by a German mechanised brigade. British forces landed on several islands, notably Kos and Leros and with the Italian forces based there, there were hopes of regaining Rhodes.

=== British occupation of Kos ===
==== 12−14 September ====
On 12 September a Special Boat Service (SBS) detachment of 55 men (Major David Sutherland) sailed for Kos from Kastellorizo in a motley of craft and RN motor launches as 38 US bombers of the IX Bomber Command attacked the airfields on Kalymnos island and Maritza airfield on Rhodes. The SBS arrived on 14 September and contacted the Italian commander who wanted to cooperate. The SBS party moved to Antimachia about 13 mi (21 km) from Kos town. At 6:40 a.m. on 14 September, a Beaufighter delivered an RAF wireless party to Antimachia airfield, as another circled overhead and at dusk Six Spitfire Mk Vs of 7 Squadron SAAF arrived from Cyprus, with the rest preparing to transfer and ground crews being delivered by three Dakotas of 216 Squadron escorted by six Beaufighters of 46 Squadron despite being fired on by Italian anti-aircraft guns in error.

On the night of 14/15 September, seven Dakotas flew from RAF Mafraq in Jordan to Nicosia to transport 120 paratroops, a mortar section and a machine-gun section of A Company, 11th Battalion, the Parachute Regiment and a headquarters group to Kos that night, the SBS marking the drop zone and Italian troops spreading straw and hay on the ground. As soon as they landed, the paratroops joined the Italians in preparing defences most exposed to seaborne landings but the coast was 80 mi (130 km) long and with the numbers available, keeping watch would be difficult. The main defensive effort was to be made around Antimachia airfield and another site for an airstrip was chosen at Lambia, north of Kos town.

==== 15 September ====
On the morning of 15 September, 216 Squadron Dakotas flew a party of 42 men from 2909 Squadron Royal Air Force Regiment flew from RAF Ramat David in Palestine to Antimachia, with nine 20 mm Hispano anti-aircraft guns but the stony ground was impossible to dig in and it was slow work building blast walls. Two Spitfires at a time kept a standing patrol and another two were on instant readiness but no Luftwaffe aircraft intervened. The SBS was relieved and departed for Samos and another SBS party arrived and moved to Simi. The commander of Force 292, Lieutenant-General Desmond Anderson arrived during the morning, carried out an inspection then left for the other islands..

==== 16–17 September ====
At dawn on 16 September, a German Junkers Ju 88 bomber from 2.(F)/123 appeared over Kos, bombed Italian coastal artillery, then bombed Antimachia. The Hispano gunners damaged it and as it flew out to sea and the standing patrol chased it towards Rhodes, shooting it down near the island. The British redeployed the Hispanos and the DLI filled in the craters. Later in the morning, C Company of the 1st Battalion, Durham Light Infantry (DLI, Lieutenant-Colonel R. F. Kirby) arrived by air and took post around the airfield. The 4th Light Anti-Aircraft Battery, 1st Light Anti-Aircraft Regiment RA also arrived by air but its 40 mm Bofors guns were being transported by sea. Parties of the 9th Indian Field Company RE and a medical unit arrived by caïque, Motor Launch and destroyer. The rest of the DLI were delivered by air (the 11th Parachute Battalion withdrew on 25 September). Another party of 58 men of 2909 Squadron, RAF Regiment arrived on 17 September with another seven 20 mm Hispano cannon, five being sent to Kos town. An Italian observation post reported seven Junkers Ju 52 transport aircraft with two Bf 109 fighter escorts. The standing patrol saw several formations of Luftwaffe aircraft and that this formation was of nine Ju 52s and attacked as they flew over Stampalia (now Astypalaia) at 300 ft (91 m). One Spitfire pilot claimed a Ju 52 shot down before returning damaged, escorted by the other Spitfire.

==== 20 September ====
Just after dawn on 20 September, two Heinkel He 111s of Einsatz II. KG 100 attacked Antimachia at 2,000 ft (610 m) as a night-fighter Beaufighter of 89 Squadron arrived from Palestine with passengers. The Beaufighter sheered off from ground fire, then shot down one of the He 111s; the other He 111 was damaged by the anti-aircraft gunners around the airfield. Six more Spitfires arrived at Kos and Beaufighters of 22 Squadron and 252 Squadron attacked shipping in Vrontis Bay in Scarpanto (Karpathos) Flak shooting one of them down. Maritza airfield on Rhodes was attacked by Beaufighters of 46 Squadron, 227 Squadron and 252 Squadron, 227 Squadron losing a Beaufighter to Flak; two Bf 109Gs of IV./JG 27 were damaged and a 252 Squadron Beaufighter set fire to a Ju 52. A Wellington of 38 Squadron crashed on take-off and the crew was killed. On the morning of 21 September a Baltimore of 454 Squadron RAAF was shot down by Flak off Skarpanto (Karpathos) and the crew taken prisoner.

==== 22 September ====
About fifty US B-24 bombers attacked targets in Greece and Rhodes. Off northern Crete a German Ar 196 of 1./SAGr 126 attacked a CANT Z.506 and was shot down by return-fire and the crew killed. Junkers Ju 88s of 4 Staffel, II./KG 6, from France, arrived at Crete, landing at Heraklion airfield on Crete from France.

=== German preparations ===
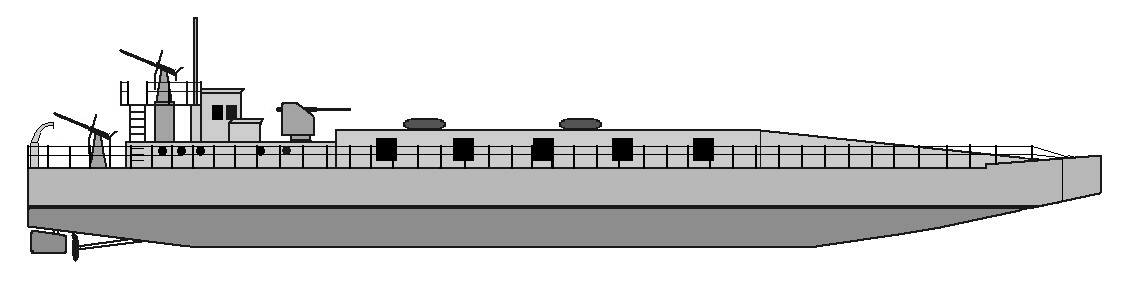
Drawing of a German Marinefährprahm

On 1 October 1943, a concentration of shipping was observed in the ports of Crete, and early on the following morning a convoy steaming in a north-north-easterly direction south-east of Melos was sighted by British aircraft. Urgent supplies were landed on Kos by five Dakotas, and during their unloading the news came that a small German invasion fleet of 10 vessels was at sea. This flotilla carried a force composed of elements of the 22nd Infantry Division (Lieutenant-General Friedrich-Wilhelm Müller) from Crete.

Kampfgruppe von Saldern (battlegroup von Saldern) comprised II.Bataillon Grenadierregiment 65, III.Bataillon Grenadierregiment 440, 3. and 4. Batterien Artillerieregiment 22, 3. Batterie Flakbataillon 22, 2. Kompanie Pioneerbataillon 22 and II. Bataillon Grenadierregiment 16 (Hauptmann Philipp Aschoff) to land on the south coast near Mount Eremita to capture the gun positions south of Platani. To attack Cape Tigani, the 15.Kompanie (Fallschirmjäger)/4. Regiment Brandenburg (Oberleutnant Oschatz) and 1.Kompanie/Küstenjägerabteilung Brandenburg (Hauptmann Armin Kuhlmann) as Kampfgruppe Kuhlmann were to make an amphibious and parachute landing.

== Prelude ==
=== Luftwaffe raids ===
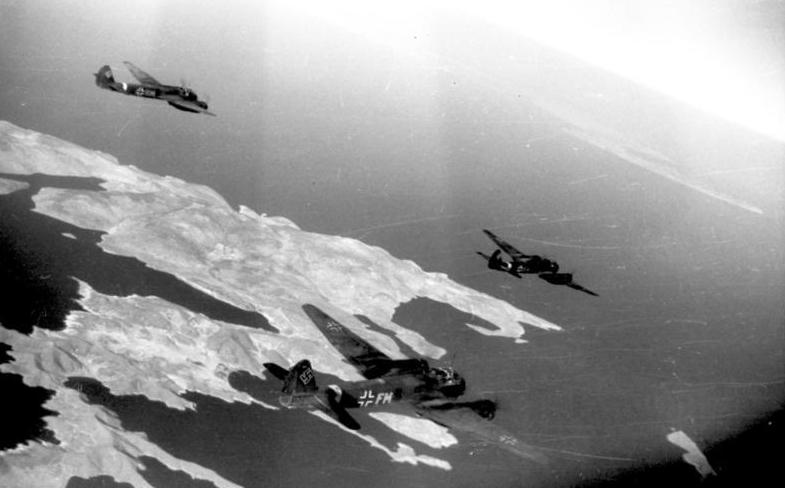
German Junkers Ju 88 bombers on their way to Kos for an operation

The Luftwaffe attack by Messerschmitt Bf 109s and Junkers Ju 88s involved met at first with varying success, because of the RAF gunners on the ground and the South African Spitfires in the air. "Butterfly Bombs" made Antimachia temporarily unserviceable and damaged the Dakotas but the first detachments of the DLI were landed. One Dakota came down in the sea and its occupants were rescued and interned in Turkey. German bombing and strafing continued to harass the garrison over the next few days. The Luftwaffe flew 100 aircraft into the Aegean bringing their strength up to 360 aircraft. While the German air cover improved, the Allies could only rely on a limited number of aircraft.

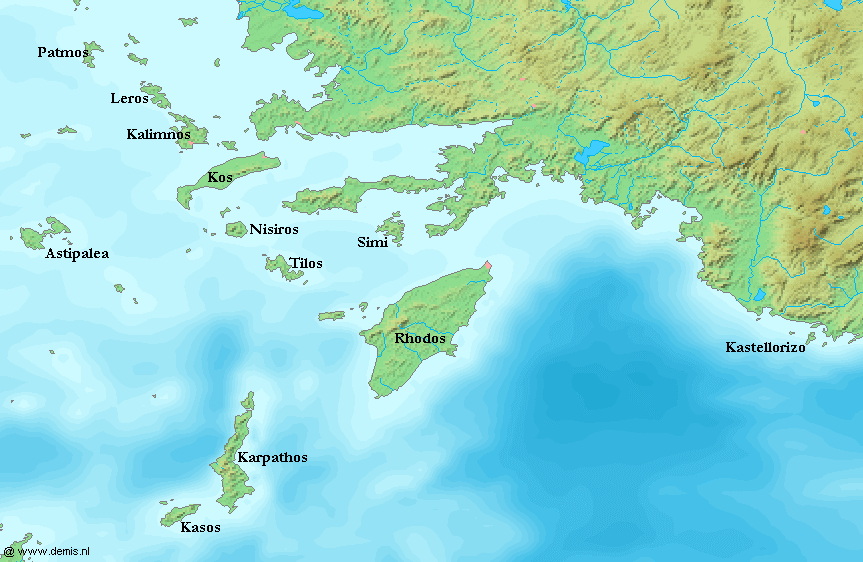
Dodecanese Islands

The limited air cover for the operation on Kos was inadequate and had a serious effect on the British ability to defend the island. Over the weeks from 13 September to 3 October the Allied aircraft defending Kos suffered many losses from bombardment of the airfield and in air combat. By 26 September, 7 Squadron was reduced to four serviceable aircraft. 74 Squadron was flown on to Kos on this day and 2909 Squadron RAF Regiment positions were attacked every day and although enemy aircraft were shot down, casualties mounted. The defenders' position on Kos, never enviable, soon became untenable, for the Italian anti-aircraft defence was negligible and their resources meagre. To add to their troubles, the area round the airfield they had to protect was too rocky to permit digging in, and there was no time to build blast walls before the German riposte was upon them. The air attacks were so severe that casualties inflicted on the British paratroopers forced them to be withdrawn on 25 September.

=== Unternehmen Eisbär ===
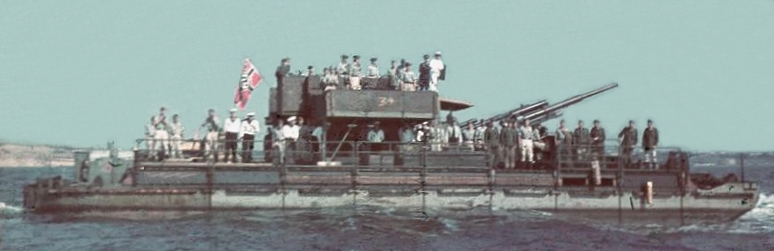
Siebel ferry with an 88 mm Flak gun (retouched)

At 04:30 hours on 3 October Unternehmen Eisbär (Operation Polar Bear), the German invasion of Kos began. By mid-day, 1,200 Germans, well-armed with field artillery and armoured cars, were ashore and in action. Dive-bombing by Junkers Ju 87s added to the difficulties of the defence, and in the afternoon Antimachia was overrun. The main German convoy, which had been attacked from the air was estimated to have consisted of seven transports, seven landing craft, three destroyers and numerous caiques (fishing craft) and other small craft. The principal landings took place at Marmari and Tingachi (in the north central part of the island) and at Camare Bay (south-west) with subsidiary landings at Forbici and Capo Foco (on the north-east and south-east tips of the island).

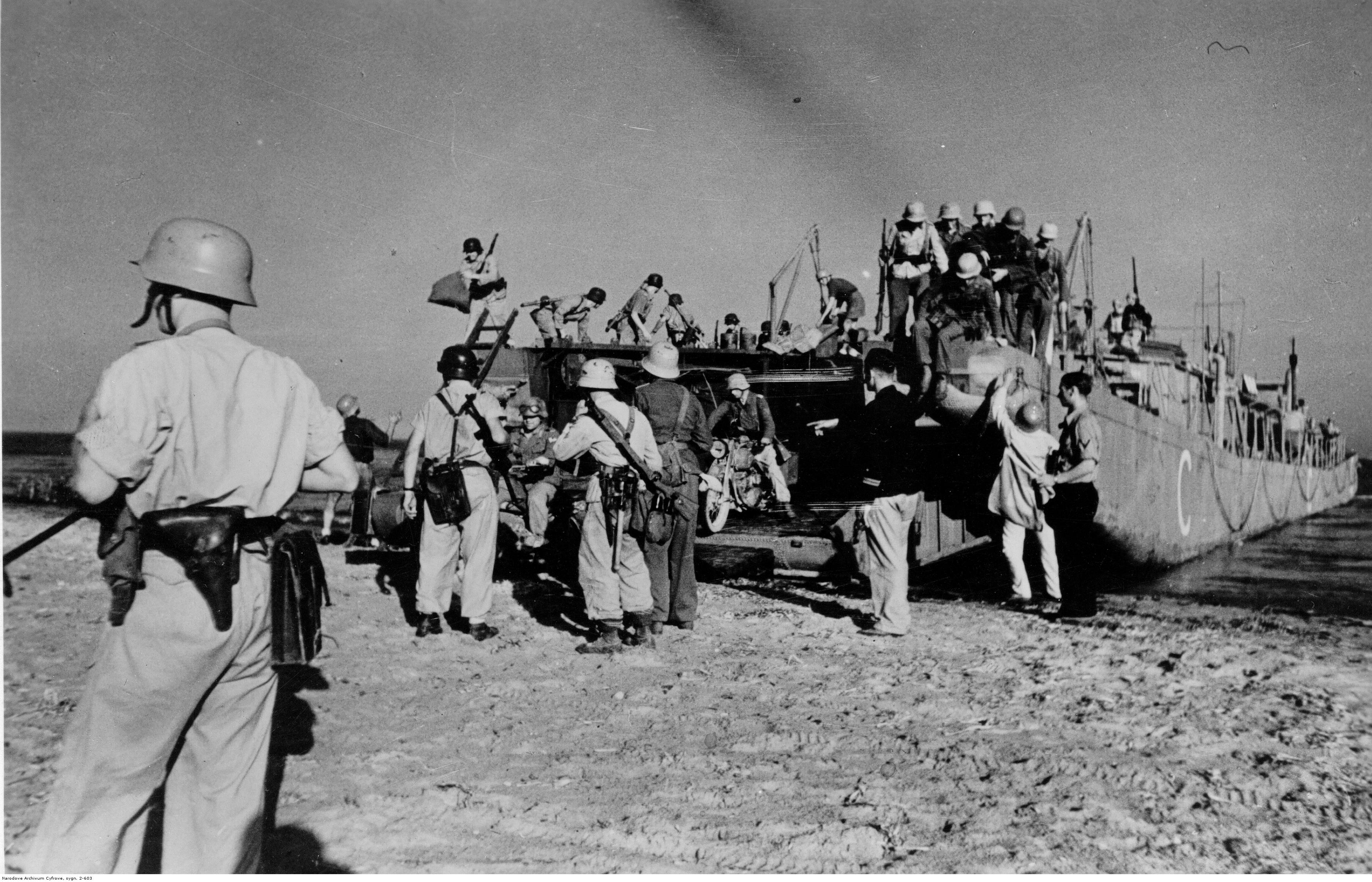
German amphibious assault on Kos

Paratroops were dropped west and south of Antimachia. By 12:00 hours the Germans were reported as having landed 1,500 men. At about 13:30 hours a further small German paratroop landing of a company from the Brandenburg Division was made in the centre of the island and more troops arrived by sea. For the British forces the situation was reported as confused but by 18:00 it was further reported as critical. The Durham Light Infantry, SBS, RAF Regiment, and paratroopers fought gallantly but in the face of superior numbers and heavier equipment were forced to withdraw to positions covering the town and port of Kos and the airfield. That evening the Germans attacked the British positions in strength, reducing the British position to a small area around the town of Kos. The German strength had been reinforced to an estimated 4,000 men by the evening of 3 October. The RAF Regiment personnel having expended all their 20 mm ammunition and then destroyed their guns took up positions with the Durham Light Infantry, withdrawing to the hills when the DLI were beaten back.

=== Casualties ===
About 11 officers and 100 men evaded capture and were brought off in small parties by the SBS over several nights following the German invasion. The last elements of 2909 Squadron, RAF Regiment, surrendered on the morning of 8 October. Of the 124 members of the Squadron, only 5 left the island unwounded. By, 4 October, Colonel Kenyon surrendered and 1,388 British with 3,145 Italian soldiers were taken prisoner on Kos. The British suffered casualties of 65 men killed and the Germans 14 men killed. The Italian commander, Colonel Felice Leggio, and 101 of his officers were executed.

== Aftermath ==
The capture of Kos was a disaster for British operations in the Dodecanese Islands. Air power determined the result of the loss of Kos and the campaign. The German capture of Kos came as a surprise and further dissuaded the Americans from involving themselves in Aegean entanglements. The Allies were unable to hold the other islands, while the Germans pressed their advantage, capturing Leros a month later and completing their conquest of the Dodecanese by the end of November. In the conclusion of the official despatch covering these operations, it is remarked that,

We failed because we were unable to establish airfields in the area of operations. [...] The enemy's command of the air enabled him so to limit the operations and impair the efficiency of land, sea and air forces that by picking his time he could deploy his comparatively small forces with decisive results. [...] Had more aircraft been available, especially modern long-range fighters, and given more luck, the operations might have been prolonged, but after the loss of Kos, if the enemy were prepared to divert the necessary effort, it is doubtful if Leros could have been held indefinitely without our embarking on a major operation for which no forces were available.

A further consequence of the German occupation of Kos was the deportation of most of the small, long-established Jewish congregation to the European death camps, where none survived the war.

== Bibliography ==
- Cunningham, Andrew (1951). A Sailor's Odyssey: The Autobiography of Admiral of the Fleet Viscount Cunningham of Hyndhope. London: Hutchinson. OCLC 2307923.
- Dunning, Chris (1998). Courage Alone: The Italian Air Force 1940–1943. Aldershot: Hikoki. ISBN 1-902109-02-3.
- Gooderson, Ian (2002). "Shoestring Strategy: The British Campaign in the Aegean, 1943". Journal of Strategic Studies. 25 (3): 1–36. doi:10.1080/01402390412331302755. ISSN 1743-937X.
- Hilberg, Raul (2003). The Destruction of the European Jews (3rd rev. ed.). New Haven and London: Yale University Press. ISBN 0-300-09557-0.
- Molony, C. J. C.; Flynn, F. C.; Davies, H. L.; Gleave, T. P. (2004) [1973]. Butler, James (ed.). The Mediterranean and Middle East: The Campaign in Sicily 1943 and the Campaign in Italy, 3rd September 1943 to 31st March 1944. History of the Second World War: United Kingdom Military Series. Vol. V (pbk. facs. repr. Naval and military Press, Uckfield ed.). London: HMSO. ISBN 978-1-84-574069-6.
- Richards, Denis; Saunders, Hilary St. George (1975) [1954]. Royal Air force 1939–1945: The Fight Avails. Vol. II. London: HMSO. ISBN 0-11-771593-X – via Archive Foundation.
- Rodd, F. (1970) [1948]. British Military Administration of Occupied Territories in Africa during the Years 1941–1947 (repr. Greenwood Press, CT ed.). London: HMSO. OCLC 1056143039.
- Rogers, Anthony (2003). Churchill's Folly: Leros and the Aegean — The Last Great British Defeat of World War II. London: Cassell. ISBN 978-0-30-436151-9.
- Schenk, Peter (1995). Ramsey, Winston; Margry, Karl (eds.). "After the Battle: The Battle for Leros". After the Battle. No. 90. London: Battle of Britain Prints International Ltd. pp. 6–39. OCLC 255133344.
- Shores, Christopher; Massimello, Giovanni; Guest, Russell; Olynyk, Frank; Bock, Winfried; Thomas, Andy (2021). A History of the Mediterranean Air War 1940–1945: From the Fall of Rome to the End of the War 1944–1945. Vol. V. London: Grub Street. ISBN 978-1-911621-97-3.
- Smith, Peter; Walker, Edwin (2008) [1974]. War in the Aegean: The Campaign for the Eastern Mediterranean in WWII. Stackpole Military History. Mechanicsburg, PA: Stackpole Books. ISBN 978-0-8117-3519-3.
