= Squadron code =

Military aircraft marking

A squadron code is a marking used on a military aircraft to visually identify the squadron that it is assigned to.

Squadron codes of the World War II era, notably for Royal Air Force (RAF) and United States Army Air Forces (USAAF) aircraft operating in Europe, typically consisted of two characters (commonly two letters; sometimes a letter and a number) to denote the squadron, plus a third character to identify a specific aircraft and serve as its call sign. In general, when an aircraft was lost or withdrawn from use, its call sign was applied to its replacement or another aircraft.

== Gallery ==
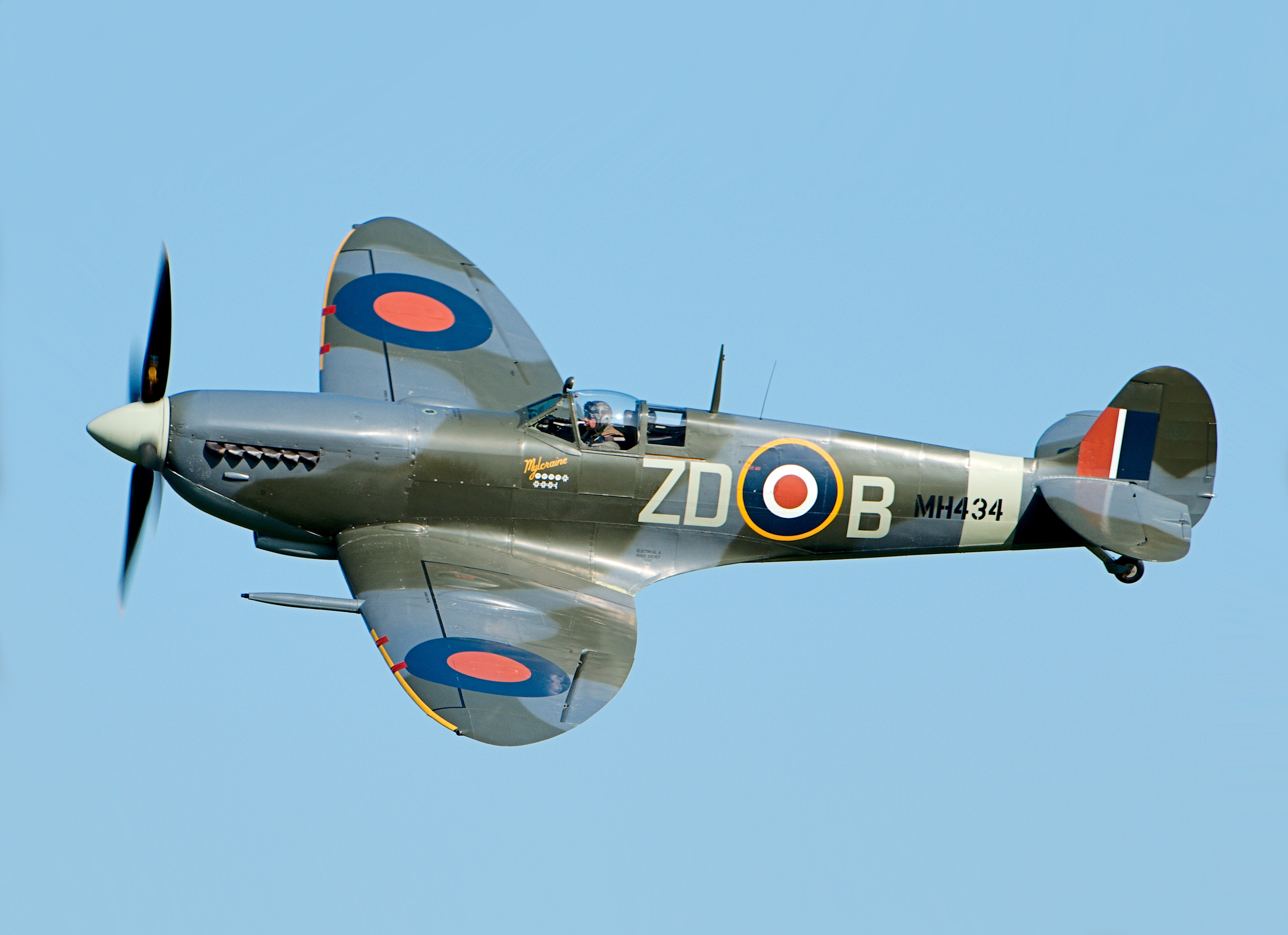
A Supermarine Spitfire with squadron code ZD, designating No. 222 Squadron RAF

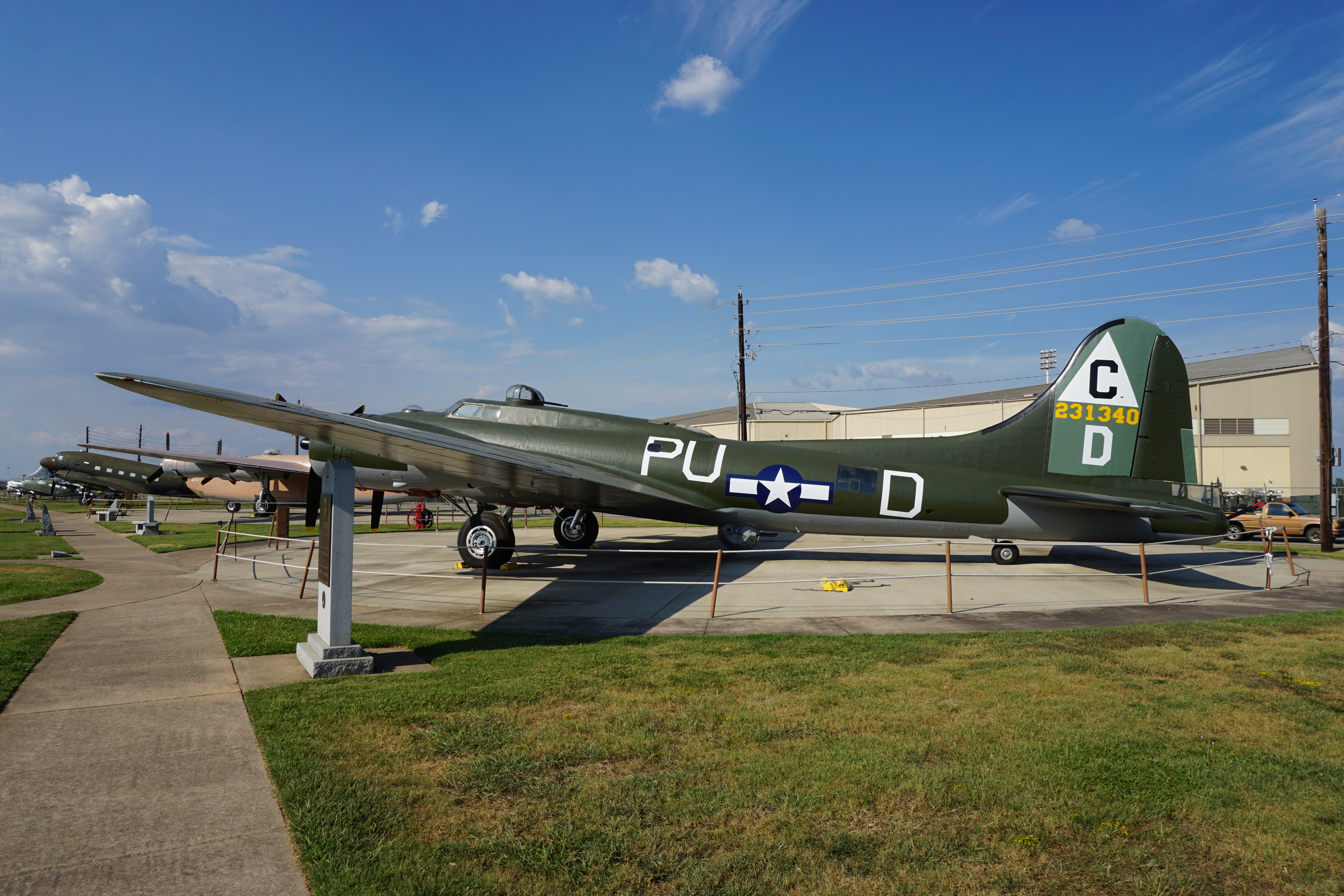
A Boeing B-17 Flying Fortress with squadron code PU, designating the 360th Bombardment Squadron of the 303rd Bombardment Group

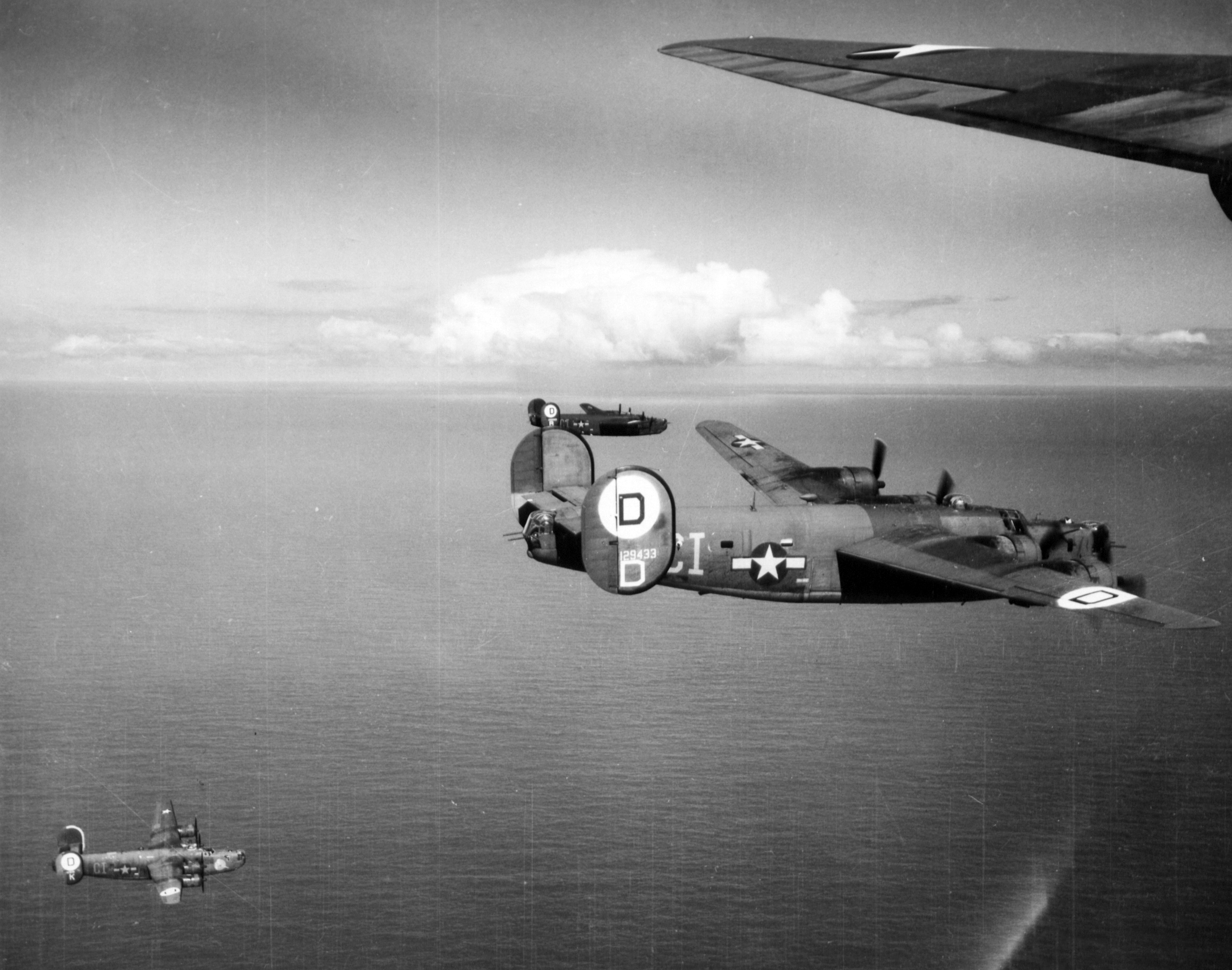
A Consolidated B-24 Liberators with squadron code CI, designating the 576th Bombardment Squadron of the 392nd Bombardment Group

== See also ==
- List of RAF squadron codes
- List of USAAF squadron codes
- South African Air Force squadron identification codes
