= Telos Painter =

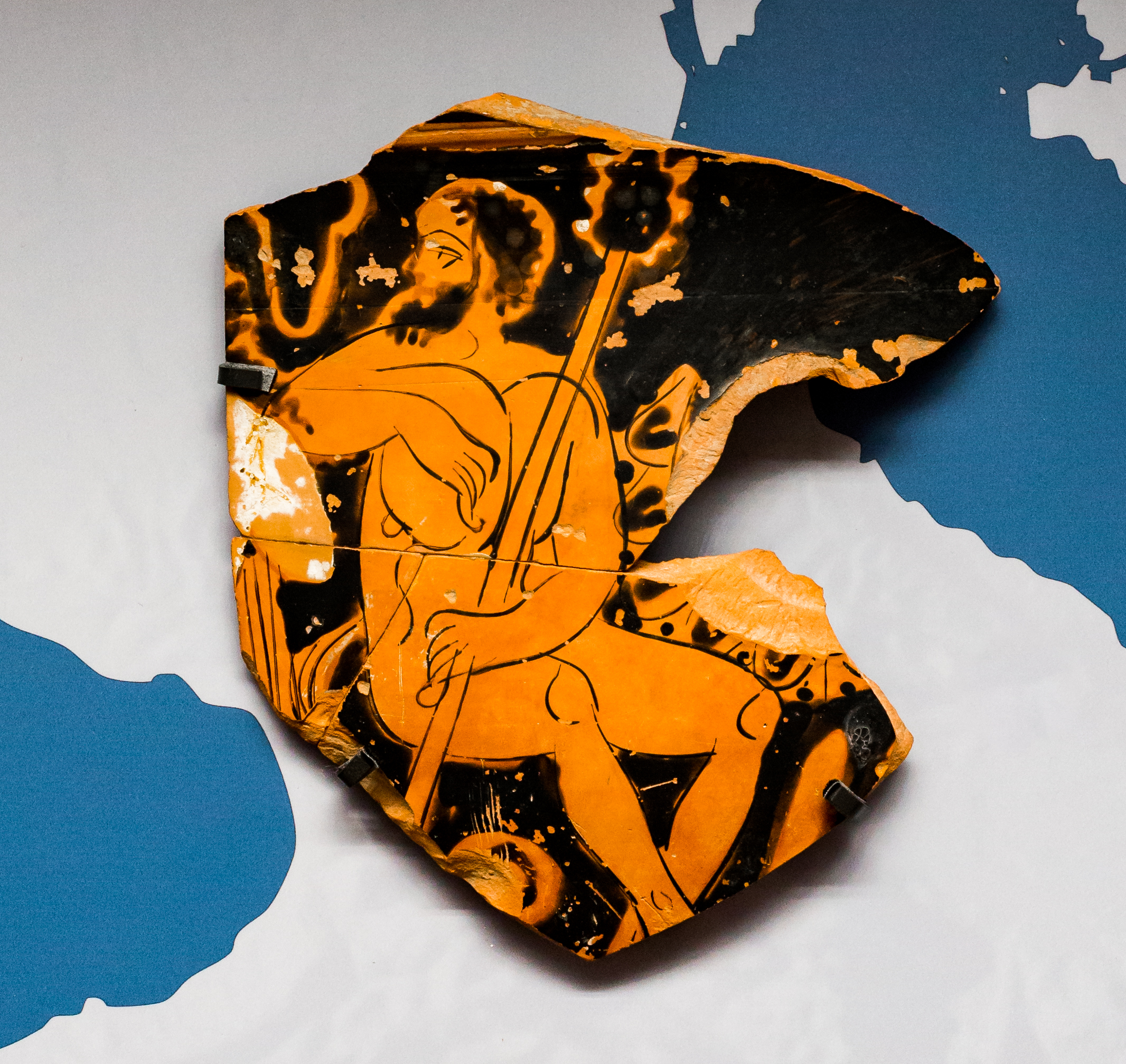
Athenian vase fragment attributed to the Telos Painter (c. 400–300 BC) from the Ashmolean Museum, Oxford

The Telos Painter (Telos-Maler, Peintre de Telos, Telos Group, Telos-Gruppe, Groupe de Telos) is identified as a vase-painter active c. 390–360 BC in Attica, Greece. Consistent stylistic references in finds point to a unique artistic figure, with John Beazley specifying his name-vase after a red-figured bell-krater in the British Museum.

The vase is said to have been found – not produced – on the small Dodecanese island of Tilos, lying off the Turkish coast between Kos and Rhodes. No context is provided and the vase was subsequently acquired by Richard Payne Knight, who bequeathed it to the British Museum in 1824. Characteristic themes of this artist's work are representations of symposia and the figure of Dionysos: the central scene of the Tilos find is the seated god looking back towards Ariadne with various satyrs in attendance.

The quality of Knight's intriguing bequest, although its context is unknown, indicates the status of Tilos in Classical times and lends the small island a certain notoriety. Further examples of the work of the Telos Painter are in museum collections around the world, inter alia: Athens, Copenhagen, London, Los Angeles, Madrid, Milan, Moscow, Paris and Vienna.

Such vessels are sought after by private collectors and appear not infrequently at auction sales.

John Beazley attributes over 40 finds to the Telos Painter in the 1963 edition of his seminal Attic Red Figure Vase Painters.
