= Douglas Loftus =

Douglas Haig Loftus
- Born: 26 August 1917; Welgedacht, South Africa
- Died: 1991; Australia
- Military career
- Branch: South African Air Force
- Rank: Colonel
- Service number: P203226V
- Commands: South African Air Force College; 7 SAAF Wing; 7 Squadron SAAF
- Conflicts: World War II
- Awards: Distinguished Service Order; Distinguished Flying Cross

Douglas Haig Loftus (1917-1991) was a South African flying ace of World War II, credited with 4 'kills' and 1 shared.

After joining the Permanent Force he served with the Coastal Artillery before moving to the South African Air Force, joining 1 Squadron SAAF. He was part of the squadron that formed the basis of 2 Squadron SAAF in Kenya, flying Hawker Furies. He scored his first victory on 24 October in a Hurricane loaned from 3 Squadron.

In May 1941 he led a detachment of the squadron to fly Hurricanes in the Western Desert. In June they converted to Tomahawks and he was appointed Officer Commanding on 21 August. He was awarded the DFC in September 1941 and he returned to South Africa where he formed 7 Squadron SAAF as first Commanding Officer. The squadron flew Hurricane I's in the Western Desert in July 1942. He was promoted Lieutenant Colonel in July and in August appointed Wing Leader of 7 SAAF Wing.

He was awarded a DSO in June 1943

In April 1944 he returned to South Africa as OC of 11 OTU Squadron SAAF until September 1945 before taking over 7 Wing again at AFB Waterkloof. He was appointed the first Commandant of the South African Air Force College.
