= South African Air Force College =

The South African Air Force College (SAAF Col) is the South African Air Force institution responsible for a wide range of general air force training to both commissioned and non-commissioned officers.

For commissioned officers and cadets, the College provides initial commissioned officer training as well as junior command and staff training.

Non-commissioned officers in the South African Air Force attend the College to receive their initial NCO training and, if subsequently selected for promotion, they return to receive advanced supervisory training.

The College's Air Power Development Centre provides air power training to members of the Air Force.

The College motto is Discendo Omnia Vinces (Latin for Knowledge Conquers Everything) and the College is based in Thaba Tshwane, Pretoria.
