= 7 Squadron SAAF =

7 Squadron
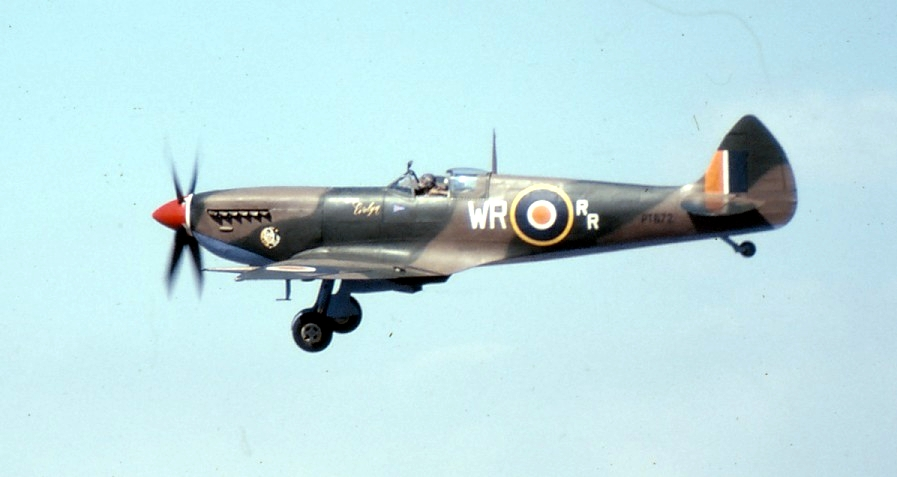
- Example of Spitfire Mk IX as flown by the Squadron at the end of WWII
- Active: 12 January 1942 – 10 September 1945; 1951–1959; 1 August 1961 – December 1992
- Country: South Africa
- Branch: South African Air Force
- Motto: Caelorum Domini Lords of the Sky

Insignia
- Squadron Identification Code: TJ 1945
- 7 Squadron Insignia

7 Squadron was a unit of the South African Air Force which served in the Second World War as well as in South Africa between 1951 and 1992. During the war, the squadron was used as a fighter squadron deployed to the Western Desert as well as in the Aegean, Italy and Ceylon. The squadron was inactive from the end of the war until 1951 when it re-activated as a citizen force training squadron, a role it retained during two periods of active service until 1992, when it was disbanded for the last time.

== History ==
7 Squadron was formed as a South African Air Force unit on 12 January 1942 at Zwartkop Air Station equipped with Harvard and Mohawk aircraft, with Douglas Loftus as commanding officer. It was re-equipped with Hurricane Mk Is in April 1942 and was then moved to Egypt. By the time the war in Africa had been concluded, the squadron was equipped with Spitfire Mk Vs in July 1943 and was tasked with convoy escort and fighter-interception sorties.

On 10 September 1943 six pilots and a DC-3 Dakota with ground staff were ordered to Cyprus to set up an advanced base to provide air cover for the planned invasion of the Dodecanese Islands. It transpired that the initial intention was that the squadron, consisting of six Spitfire Mk Vs, was to be the total air cover contingent for the planned invasion. However, by 13 September the squadron was joined by two more of the squadron's Spitfires all operating from the island of Kos. They were later joined by 74 Squadron RAF but by then the Luftwaffe attacks on Kos had severely damaged the primitive airfields and after intense aerial fighting, there was only one serviceable Spitfire left in the squadron by 1 October. On 3 October German landings commenced and the grounded SAAF personnel were compelled to escape by whatever means possible – some crossed to Turkey in small boats and others were evacuated back to Egypt with the retreating allied ground forces. By the time of re-assembly in Egypt, the squadron had lost six officers killed and 15 other ranks missing for the cost of 12 enemy aircraft having been shot down. The squadron remained in Egypt for a few months, and then in April 1944, equipped with Spitfire Mk lXs, rejoined No. 7 Wing in Italy.

After the surrender of German forces in Italy, the squadron was sent to the Far East, but the war in the East ended before the squadron could be deployed. It then returned to Ceylon and thereafter back to South Africa. It was disbanded on 10 September 1945.

The squadron was reformed at Ysterplaat Air Station in August 1951 and was equipped with Harvards and was again disbanded in 1959. It was re-formed once more at Youngsfield in the Cape on 1 August 1961 and later moved to Ysterplaat in 1969. The squadron received Impala Mk Is in 1977 as a citizen force unit and was moved to Cape Town International Airport in 1978. It was again moved to AFB Langebaanweg and to AFB Pietersburg. The squadron was disbanded in December 1992.

== Aircraft ==
Aircraft flown by 7 Squadron
Note: Aircraft type photographs may not necessarily represent aircraft of the same mark or actual aircraft belonging to the squadron.
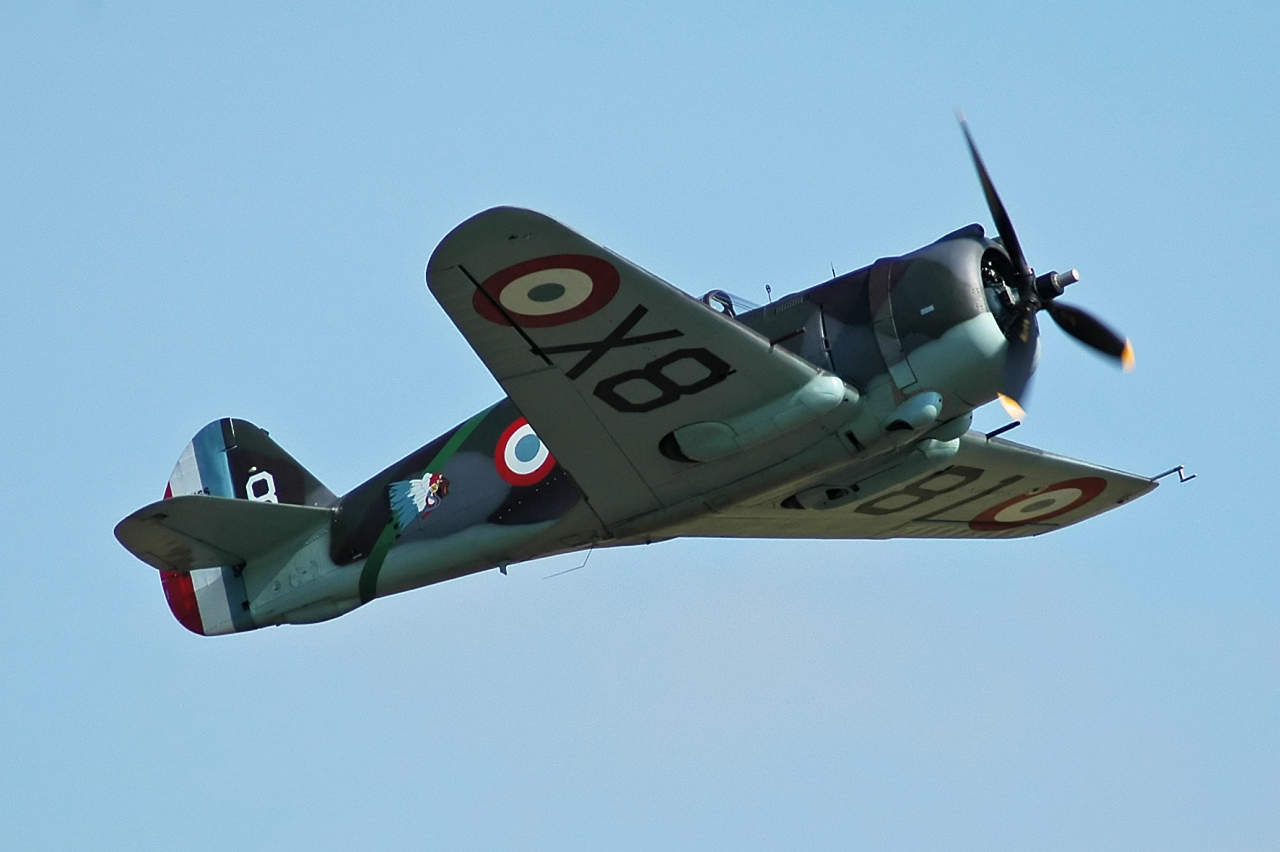
Curtiss Mohawk
1942

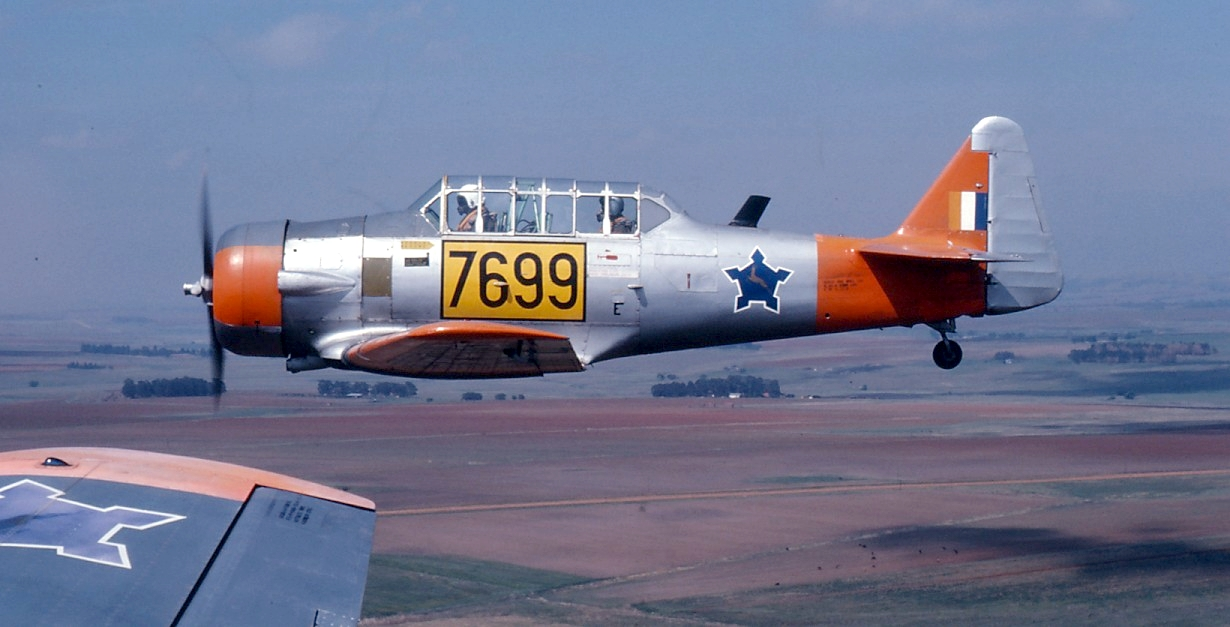
North American Harvard
1942, 1951-1959, 1961-1977

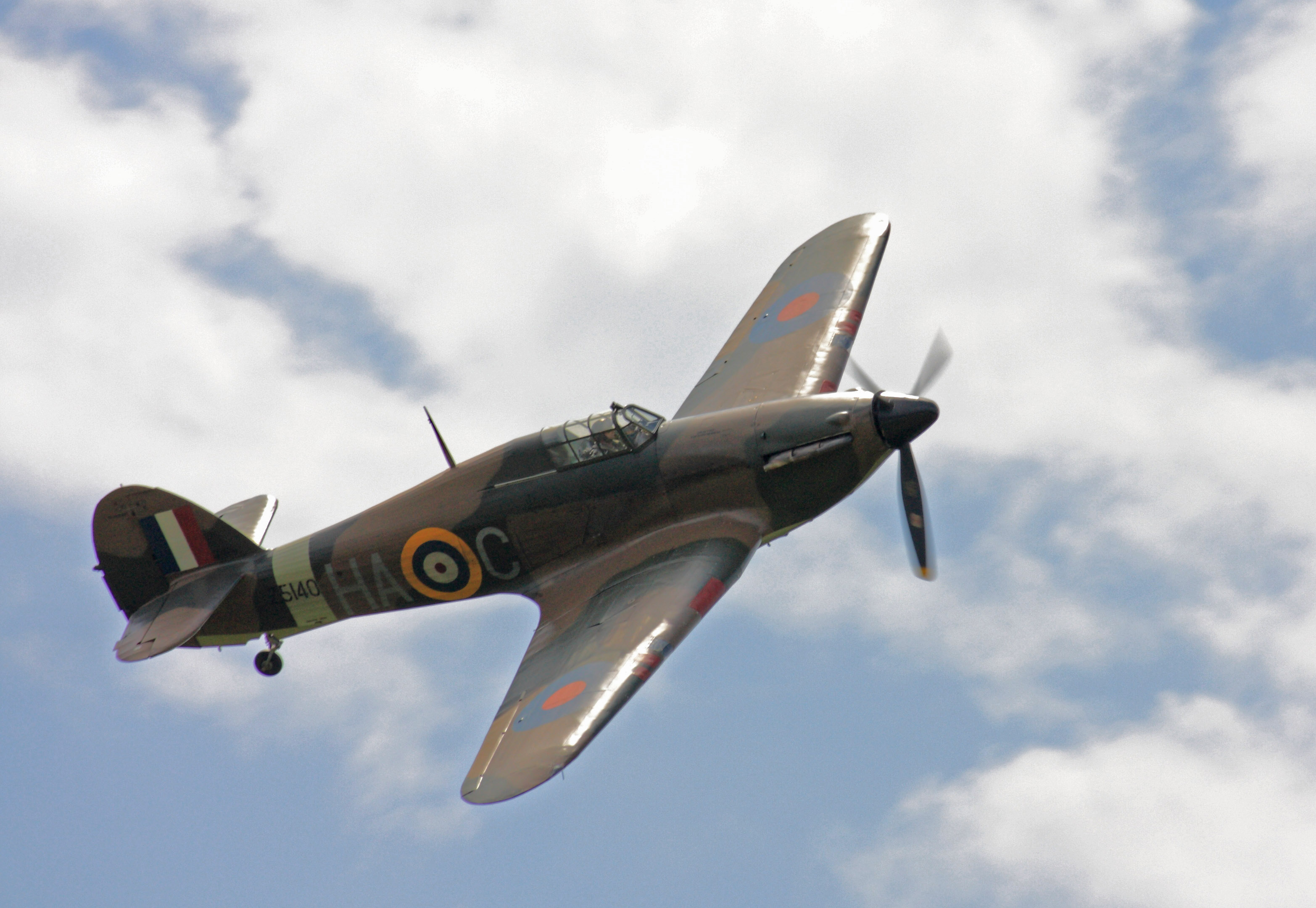
Hawker Hurricane Mk I
1942-1943

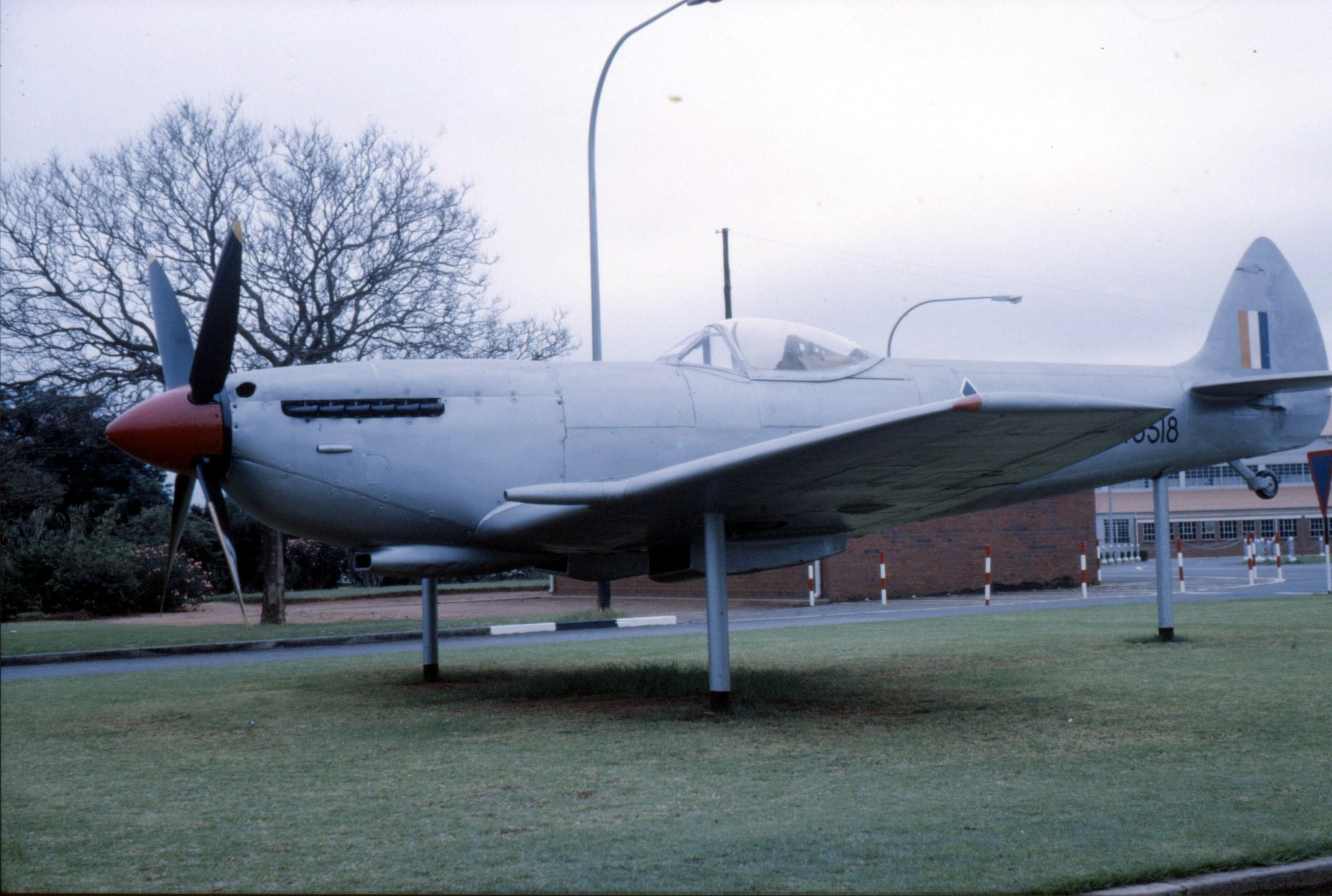
Supermarine Spitfire Mk. V
1943-1944

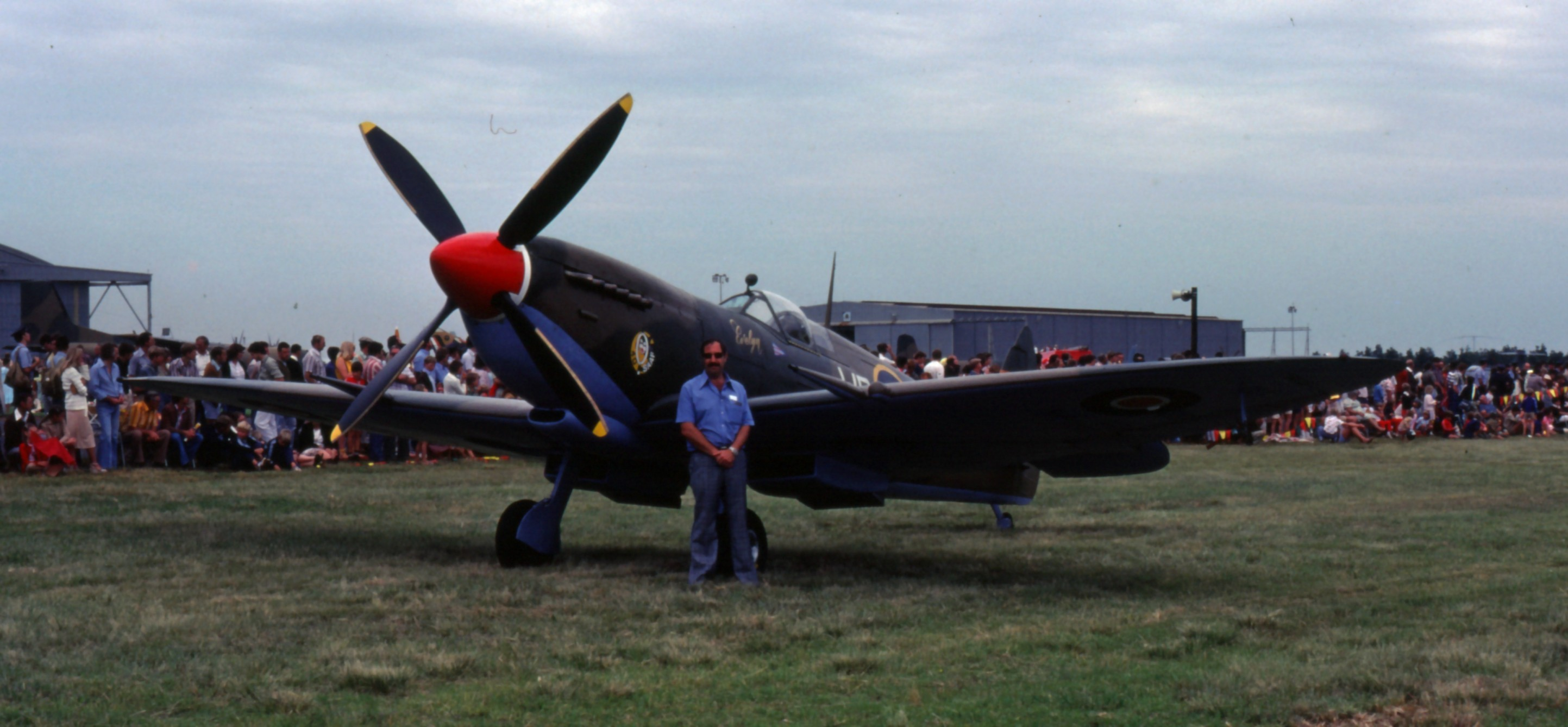
Supermarine Spitfire Mk. IX
1944-1945

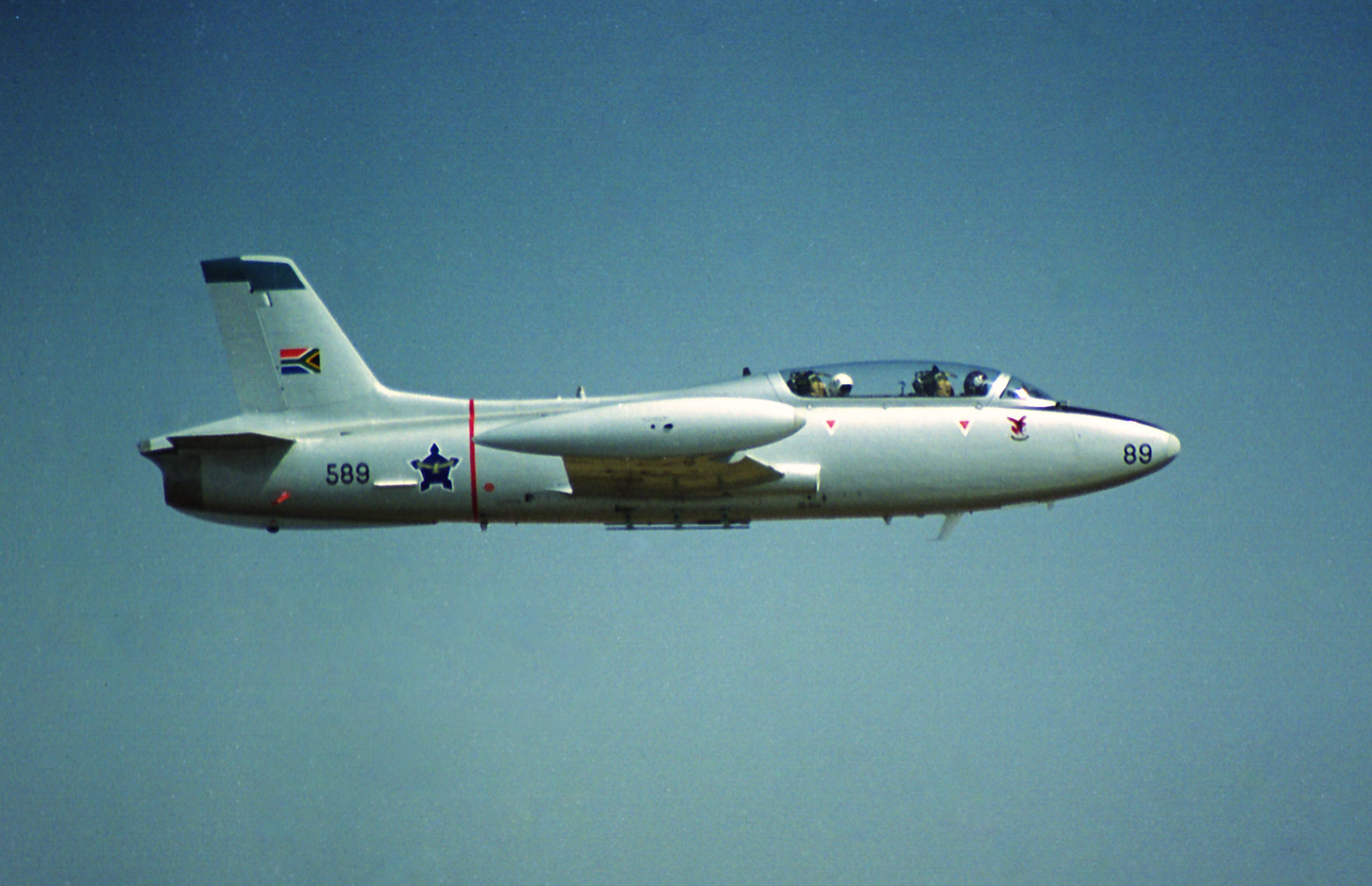
Atlas Impala Mk. I
1977-1992

== See also ==
- List of World War II aces from South Africa

== Notes ==
Footnotes

Citations
