= Tilos =

Greek island and municipality

Tilos Τήλος
- Municipality
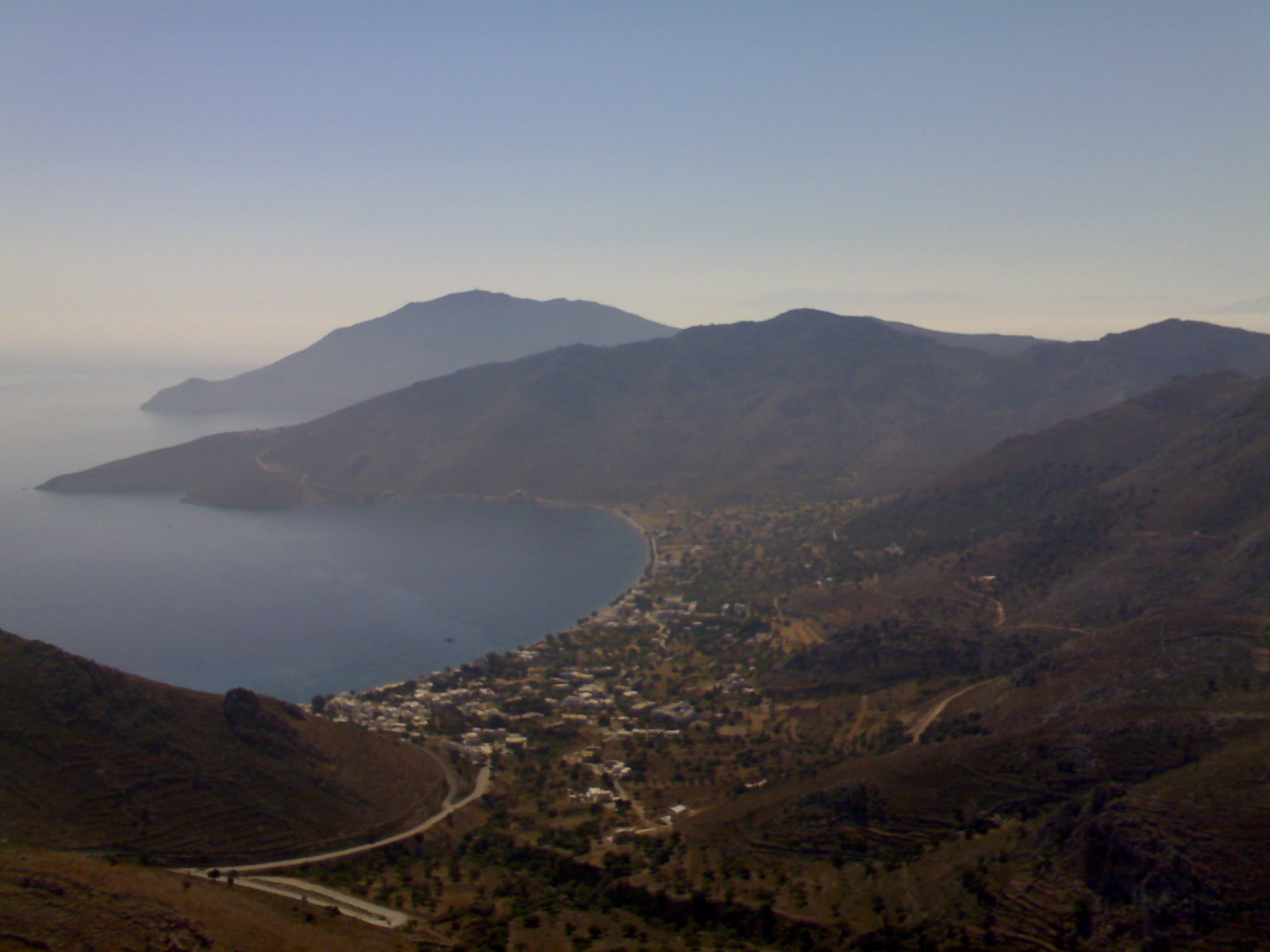
- View over Livadia, the port and main village on Tilos

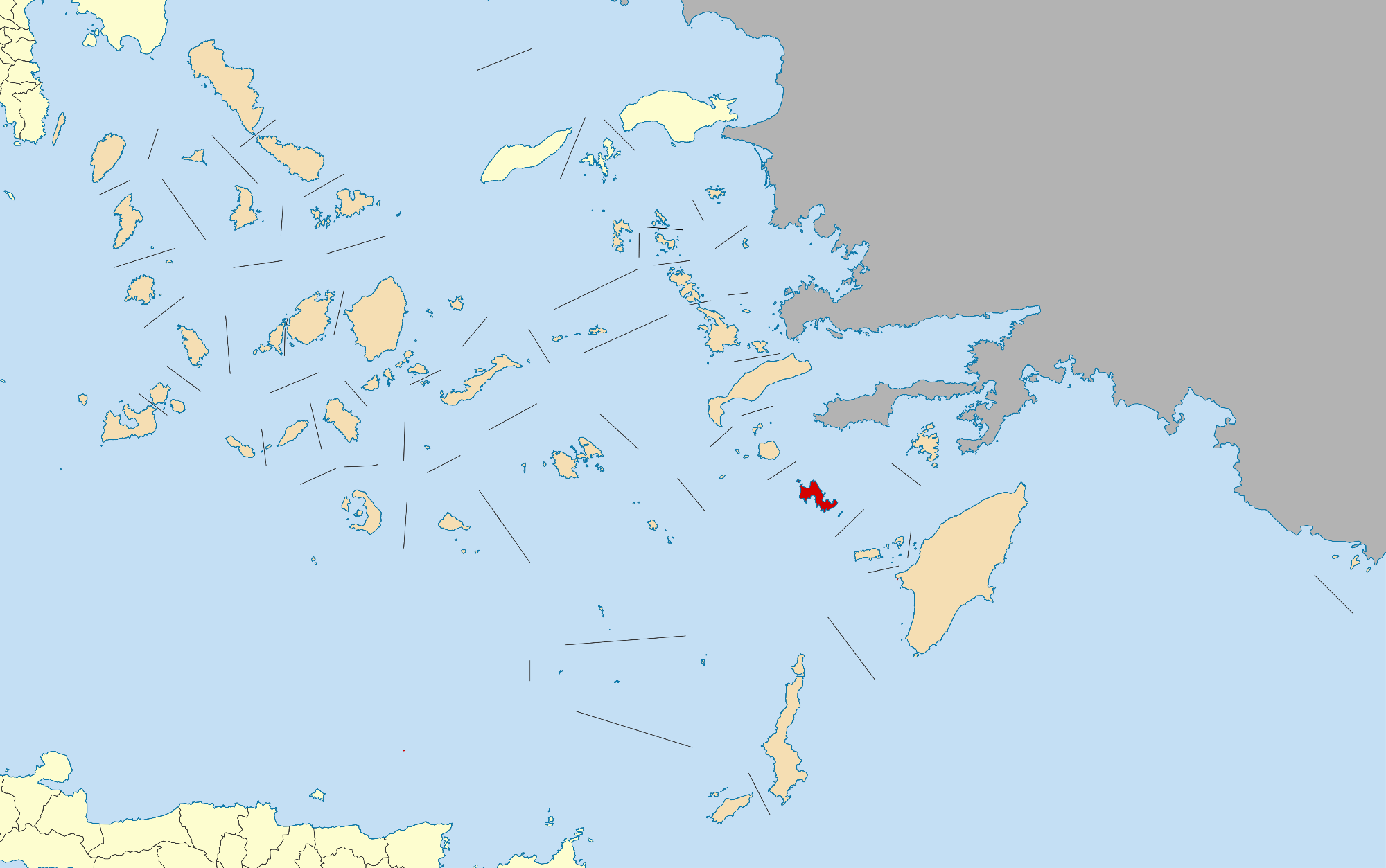

- Location within Greece
- Coordinates: 36°26′N 27°22′E
- Country: Greece
- Administrative region: South Aegean
- Regional unit: Rhodes

Area
  - Municipality: 64.525 km^{2} (24.913 sq mi)
- Highest elevation: 654 m (2,146 ft)
- Lowest elevation: 0 m (0 ft)

Population (2021)
  - Municipality: 746
  - Density: 11.6/km^{2} (29.9/sq mi)
- Time zone: UTC+2 (EET)
  - Summer (DST): UTC+3 (EEST)
- Postal code: 850 02
- Area code: 22460
- Vehicle registration: ΚΧ, ΡΟ, ΡΚ
- Website: www.tilos.gr

Tílos (Greek: Τήλος; Ancient Greek: Τῆλος, romanized: Telos) is a small Greek island and municipality located in the Aegean Sea. It is part of the Dodecanese group of islands, and lies midway between Kos and Rhodes. In 2021, the island had a population of 746 people. Along with the uninhabited offshore islets of Antitilos and Gaidaros, it forms the Municipality of Tilos, which has a total land area of 64.525 square kilometres (24.913 sq mi). Tilos is part of the Rhodes regional unit.

Popularly, Telos was the son of Helios and Halia, the sister of the Telchines. He came to the island in search of herbs to heal his ill mother, and later returned to found a temple to Apollo and Neptune. However, Telos (Telo or Tilo) does not appear in Greek mythology and the name probably has an unknown pre-Hellenic origin. Pliny the Elder notes that in antiquity Telos was known as Agathussa (Αγαθούσσα) (also Agathusa and Agathousa). In the Middle Ages, it was known by the Italian as Episcopio, either because it was a Bishop Seat or because its position as Vantage Point. The island has also been called in Turkish İlyaki and in modern Italian Piscopi.

== History ==
During the Late Pleistocene, suggested to be from about 45,000 years ago, the island was inhabited by a dwarf elephant species, Palaeoloxodon tiliensis, whose remains have been found in the Charkadio cave, near the centre of the island. Based on preliminary radiocarbon dating, some authors have suggested that the elephants survived until around 1500 BC on the island, which would make them the latest elephants to have lived in Europe; however, other authors consider this unconfirmed.

Humans have been present on the island since at least the Final Neolithic around the 4th millennium BC, based on evidence found at Charkadio cave and elsewhere on the island.

=== Iron Age ===
- In the 7th century BC, colonists from Tilos and Lindos settled in Sicily and founded the city of Gelas.

=== Classical antiquity ===
- The island flourished during the classical era, minting its own coinage and being famed for clothing and perfumes.
- Telos claims that poet Erinna (said to be Sappho's equal) was born on the island around 350 BC. Charles Anthon (1853) describes her thus:

Erinna (Ήριννα) friend & contemporary of Sappho (about 612 BC) died at 19, left behind her poems which were thought worthy to rank with those of Homer. Her poems were of the epic class; the chief of them was entitled Ήλακάτη, "The Distaff" it consisted of three hundred lines, of which only four are extant. It was written in a dialect which was a mixture of the Doric and Aeolic, and which was spoken at Rhodes, where, or in the adjacent island of Telos, Erinna was born. She is also called a Lesbian and a Mytilenean, on account of her residence in Lesbos with Sappho. There are several epigrams upon Erinna, in which her praise is celebrated, and her untimely death is lamented. Three epigrams in the Greek Anthology are ascribed to her, of which the first has the genuine air of antiquity, but the other two, addressed to Baucis, seem to be a later fabrication.

- Herodotus (484 BC – c. 425 BC) described the centuries preceding him as the golden age of Tilos.
- In the 5th century BC, Tilos was a member of the First Delian League and kept its independence until the end of the Peloponnesian War.
- From the turn of the 4th century BC, for the next 200 years, Tilos was subject to the Seleucid Empire, Caria and then Ptolemaic Egypt under the influence of Rhodes, until in 200 BC, the island was incorporated into the Rhodian confederacy.

=== Roman period ===
- The island was conquered by the Romans in 42 BC. Archaeological finds from Roman and early-Christian times demonstrate the prosperity of the island until the 551 Beirut earthquake.

=== Byzantine ===
Tilos followed Rhodes into the Byzantine Empire, following the death of Theodosius I, and was a member of the naval Theme of Samos between the 9th and 14th century.

=== Crusaders ===
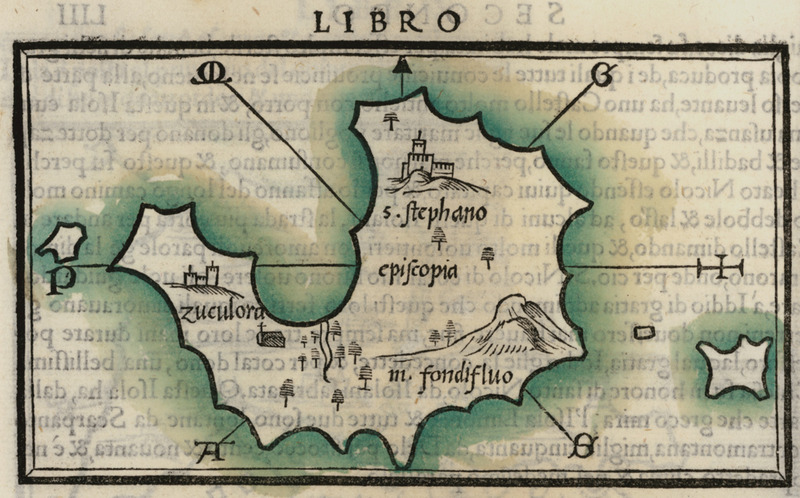
Map of Tilos, 1547

The Knights of Saint John took control of Tilos from 1309, restoring the Byzantine castles, and building new ones in order to defend against pirate raids. It was evacuated in 1470 as the Ottomans began the Siege of Rhodes and control passed to Suleiman I in 1522 when Rhodes fell.

=== Ottoman ===
In 1523, Tilos was conquered by the Ottoman Empire and the island was put under the privileged administrative and tax system known as "maktou." Christian pirates pillaged the island constantly.

=== 19th-century antiquarian research ===
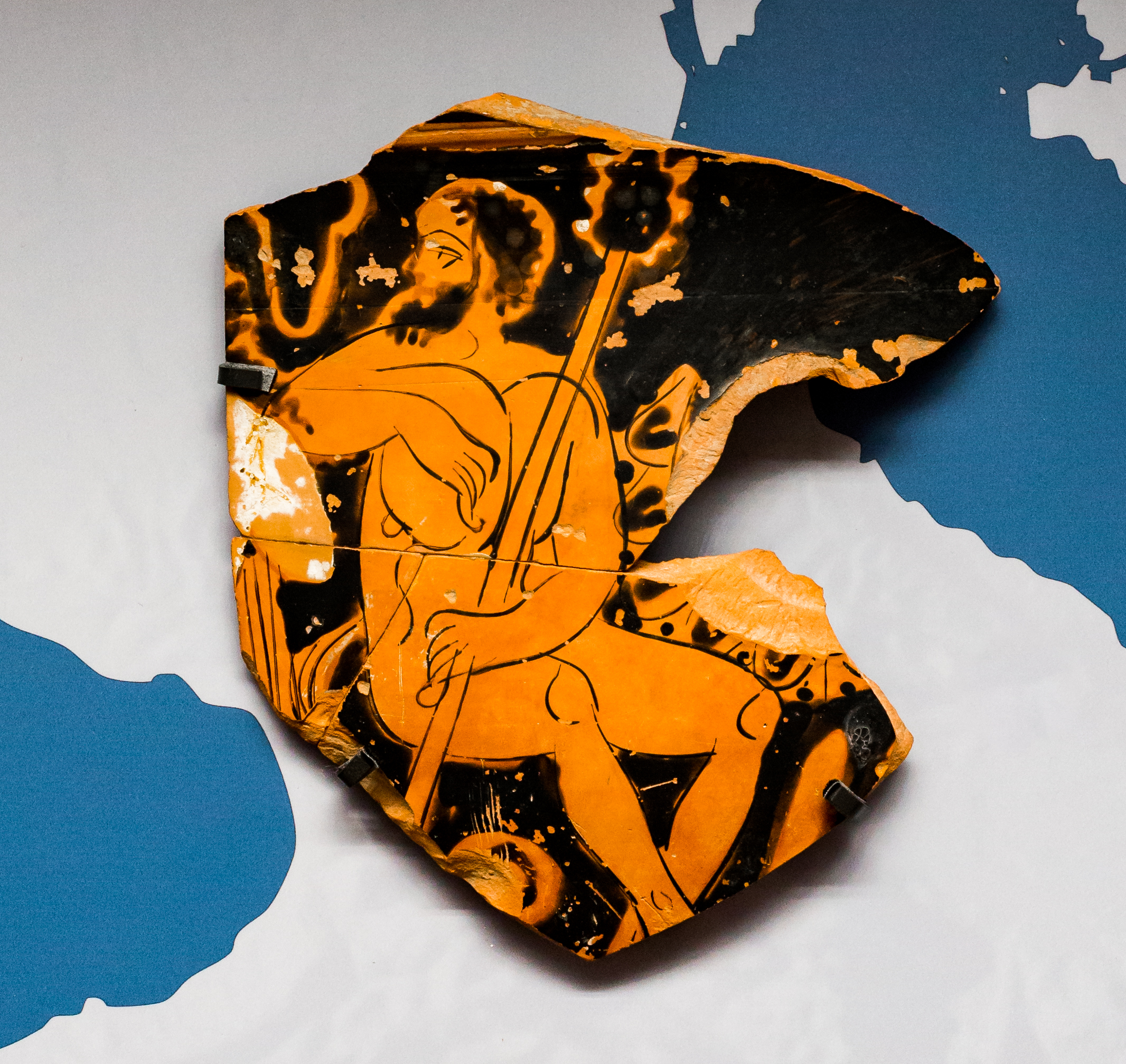
Athenian vase fragment attributed to the Telos Painter (c. 400–300 BC) from the Ashmolean Museum, Oxford

Despite its relative significance in Classical times, the island has left little in the way of its earlier material culture other than elements of its architectural remains and finds of its coinage, featuring the characteristic crab on the reverse. Openly accessible on the maritime route along the western Asia Minor littoral, the island must for centuries have seen its cemeteries, as well as its domestic, civic, and religious sites, looted. Serious antiquarian research began in the second half of the 19th century, coinciding with both the Turkish and Greek authorities becoming more aware of the need to restrict unlicensed excavations, although in remoter regions this was difficult, if not impossible. The British Museum has a small number of acquisitions from the island, notably from the collections of Charles Newton and Thomas Spratt. The first antiquarian visit of note was that made by Ludwig Ross in May 1844 when he spent a few days visiting sites, including the acropolis. Remarkably, the next dedicated investigations were not to occur for some 40 years, when, in late February 1885, the English explorers Theodore and Mabel Bent excavated various graves, but removed nothing of significance. Their base was the small monastery below Megálo Chorió, serendipitously a few metres from the site of the island's new archaeological museum. Undoubtedly, to date the island's most celebrated archaeological find is the Attic red-figured bell-krater (390–360 BC) attributed to the 'Telos Painter', which is now in the British Museum. The vessel was bequeathed to the museum in 1824 by Richard Payne Knight, who specified its provenance as 'Telos'. Based on this, John Beazley classified a group of stylistically similar, beautifully decorated vessels under this name, and several other examples are kept in museums around the world.

As for the early 20th century, in the summer of 1906 the island was visited by the British academics R. M. Dawkins and A. J. B. Wace during a wider tour of the region. They published their observations “in the hope that they may be of some service to other travellers”, and their article includes a bibliography and five rare photographs. The Symian antiquarians Michael and Niketas Chaviaras were active in the region around the same time and the Symi museum contains many of their finds. In 1920, Niketas Chaviaras found 23 inscriptions on Tilos.

=== 20th Century ===
Ottoman rule lasted until May 12, 1912, when Italian sailors landed in the bay of Eristos during the Italo-Turkish War. Tilos then became part the Italian possession of the Isole Italiane dell'Egeo. After the Italian Armistice of September 8, 1943, Tilos was occupied by German troops, and in 1948 it joined Greece together with all the Dodecanese islands. Since 1948, the population of the island has declined rapidly, as many Tilians migrated to the United States or Australia. This led to Mikro Chorio becoming a ghost town, nowadays an attraction on its own merits.

In June 2008, Anastassios Aliferis, the Socialist mayor of the island performed the first same-sex marriages in Greece, citing a legal loophole and defying claims of illegality by a Greek prosecutor.

In late 2018 Tilos will become the first island in the Mediterranean to run exclusively on wind and solar power.

== Geography ==
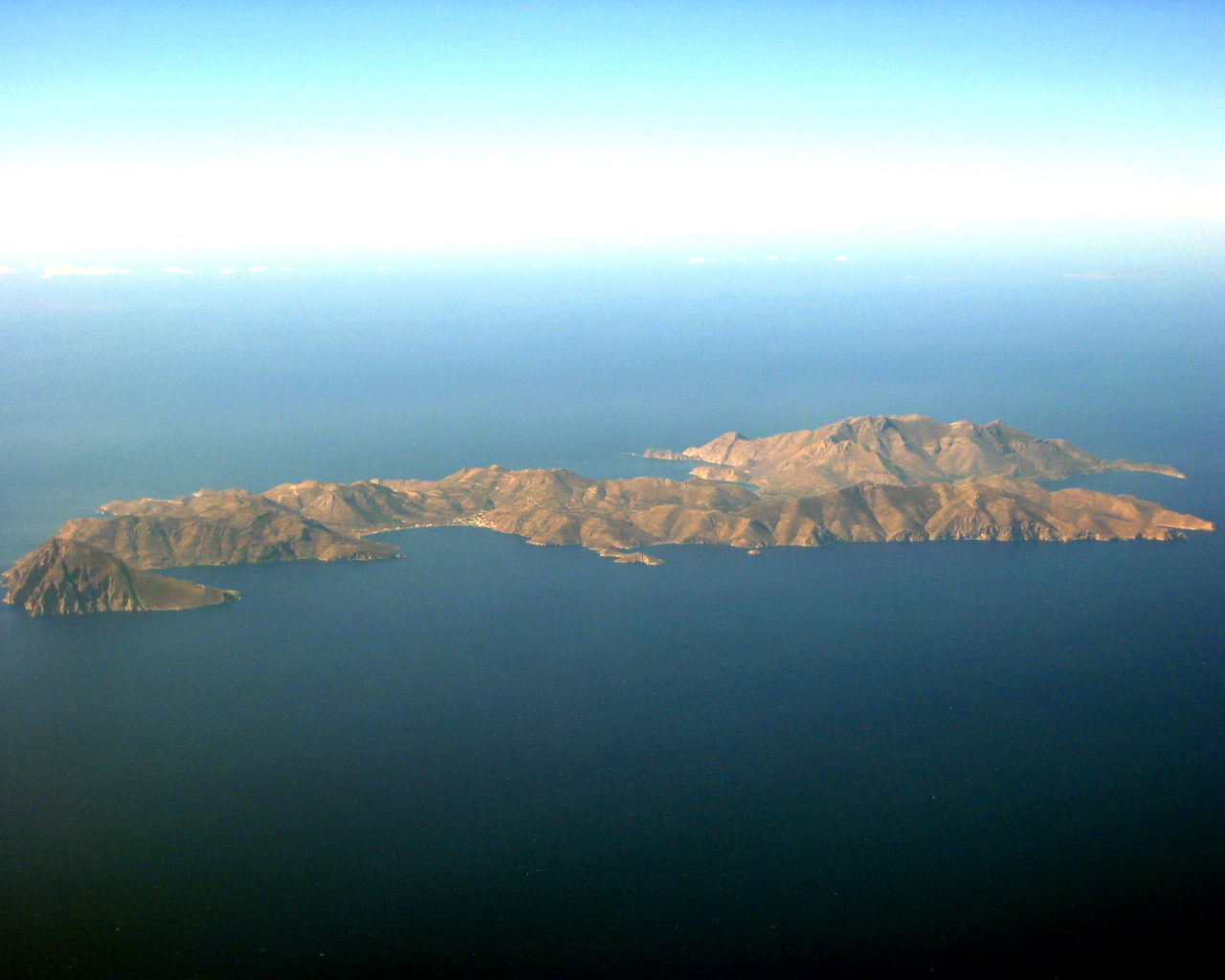
Tilos (aerial view)

Tílos has an inverted 'S' shape, is about 14.5 km (9.0 mi) long, north-west to south-east, with a maximum width of 8 km (5 mi) and an area of about 61 square kilometres (24 sq mi). The island has a mountainous limestone interior, volcanic lowlands, pumice beds and red lava sand, like its north western neighbour Nisyros. It is well supplied by springs, and is potentially very fertile and productive. Its coasts are generally rocky or pebbled, but there are also a number of sandy beaches.

=== Climate ===
Tilos has a mediterranean climate, typical for the region.

== Landmarks ==
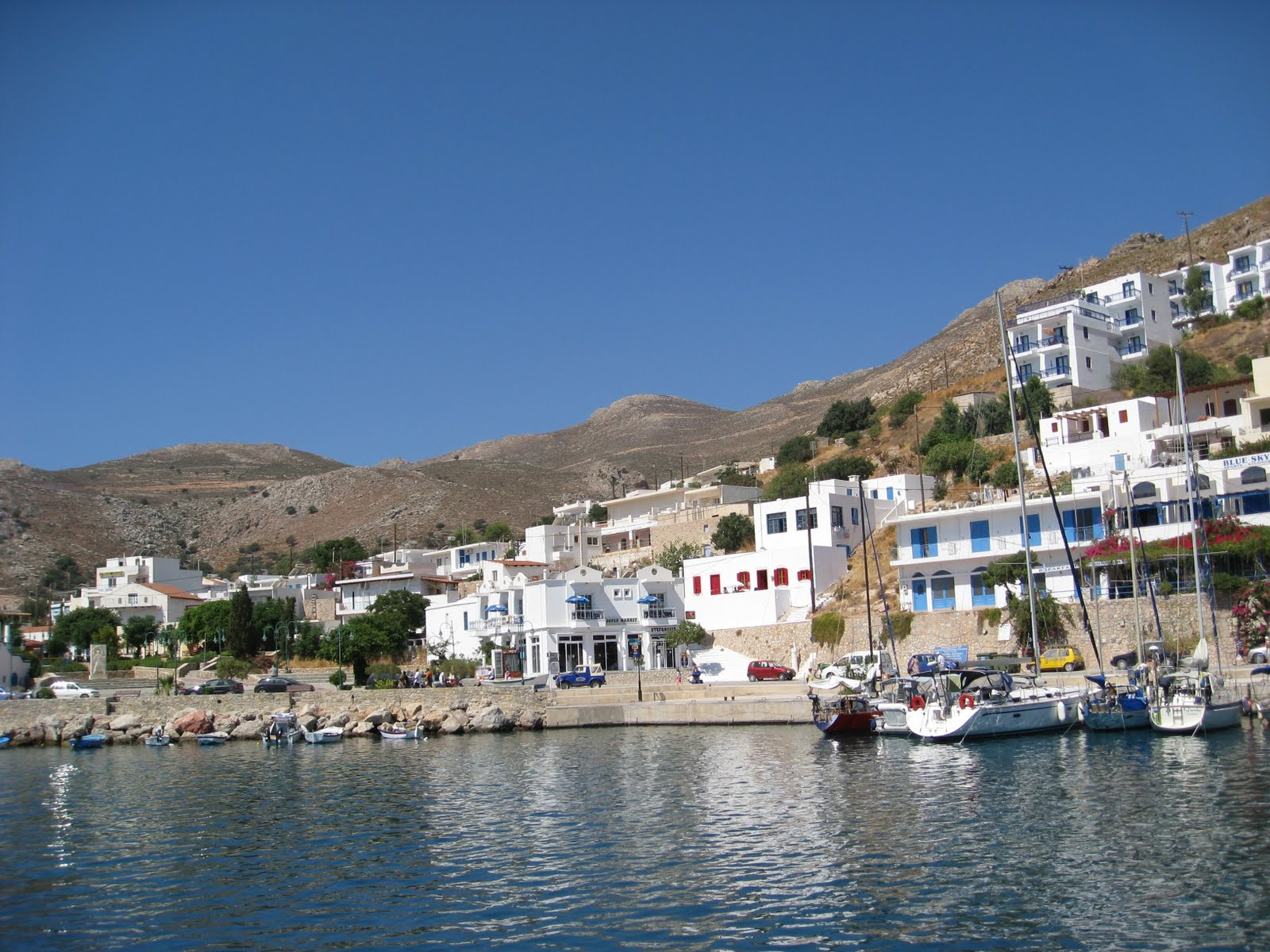
View of Livadia village in Tilos island

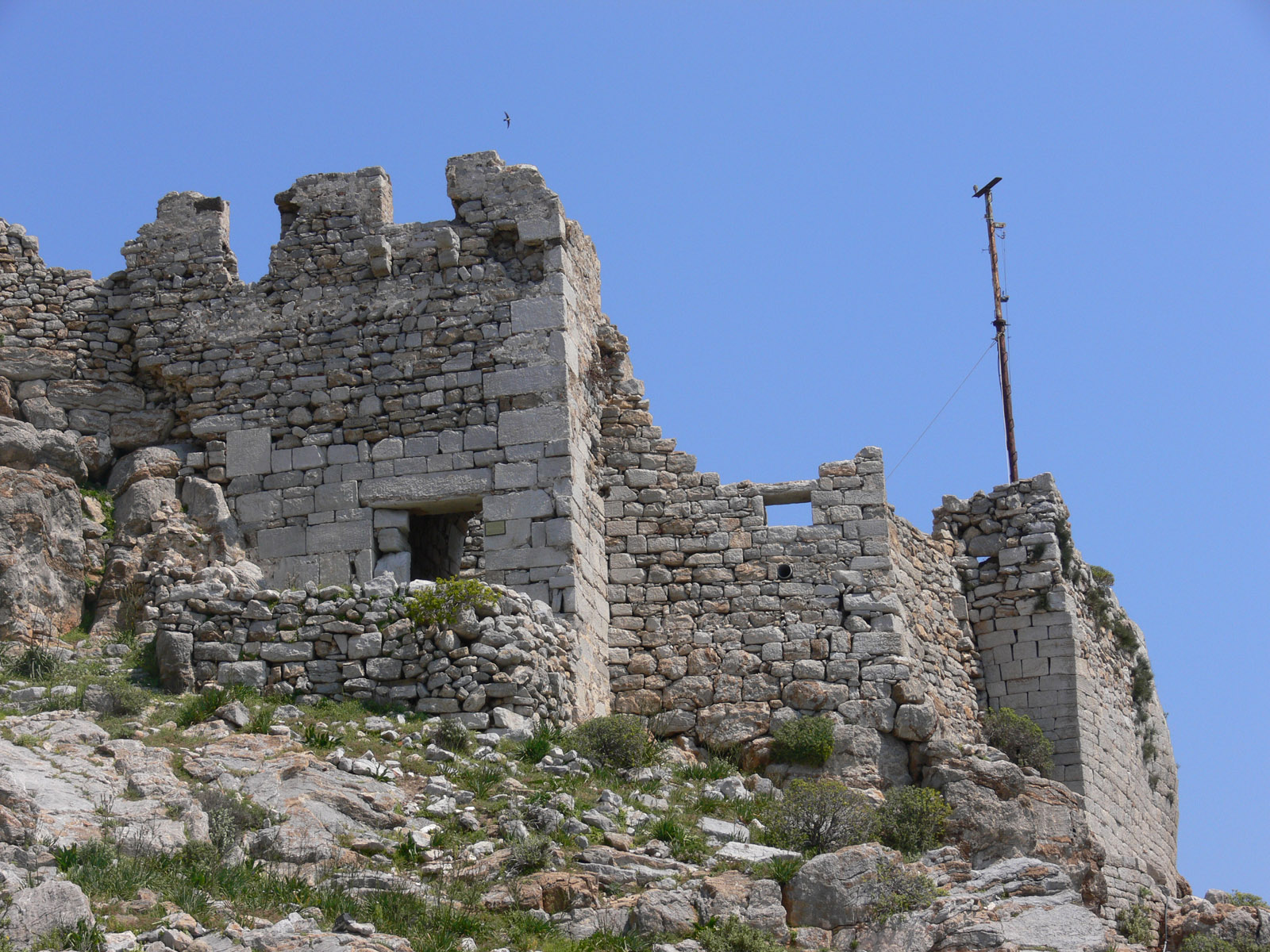
Ruins of the medieval castle in Megalo Chorio

At the north-west end of the island, the Monastery of Áyios Pandeleímon, (also the island's patron saint), sits on the slopes of Mount Profítis Ilías (654 metres (2,146 ft)). The monastery features fresh cold water springs as well as an enormous loquat tree (called "Musmulla" in Greek). The mountain borders a fertile plain running across the island's width, with the settlements of Áyios Andónis to the north and Éristos to the south. To the north-east of the plain is the island's capital, Megálo Chorió, built in the early 19th century at the foot of the ancient city of Telos. The archaic ruins stretch up to the site of the acropolis of the ancient city, dedicated to Pythios Apollo and Poliada Athina, and the Venetian Kástro, built over it. Charkadio Cave is around two kilometres south of the village of Megalo Chorio.

Above the cave stand the ruins of the medieval Fortress of Mesariá. At southern end of the island, bordered by more fertile meadows, is Livádhia, the major harbour and economic centre of the island. The island's old capital, Mikró Chorió, first settled in the 15th century by the Knights of the Order of St John, overlooks the bay. It has been completely abandoned since 1960, its inhabitants having moved down to the harbour in the 1930s. A number of other settlements such as Lethrá, Gherá, and Panó Méri have similarly been abandoned. Mount Áyios Nikoláos (367 metres (1,204 ft)) stands to the south of the bay.

=== Castles ===
Kástros (castles) have protected the island's inhabitants from pirate raids since the Dark Ages.

- Megálo Chorió
- Mesariá
- Mikró Chorió
- Agrosikiá
- Stavroú Lámbrou

== Power grid ==
Tilos has an undersea cable connecting it to Kos via Nisiros. This struggled to cope with the large summer population, and frequently failed. This has been reinforced with solar power, wind turbines and a battery farm, making Tilos self-sufficient with fully renewable electricity.

== Notes ==
- "Book IV, CHAP. 23.--THE SPORADES". Pliny the Elder, The Natural History (eds. John Bostock, Henry Thomas Riley.).
- M. Masseti (2001). "Did endemic dwarf elephants survive on Mediterranean islands up to protohistorical times?" (PDF). Atti Congresso Internazionale “La Terra degli elefanti”, CNR Roma 46-52. pp. 402–406.
- Bertarelli, L.V. (1929). Guida d'Italia, Vol. XVII (in Italian). Milano: Consociazione Turistica Italiana.
- Anthon, Charles (1853). A Manual of Greek Literature from the Earliest Authentic Periods to the Close of Byzantine Era. Harper & brothers.
- "Tilos". Tilos Park website.
- "Tilos for sailors". Tilos sailor information. Archived from the original on August 14, 2007.
