= 12 Squadron SAAF =

South African Air Force squadron

12 Squadron
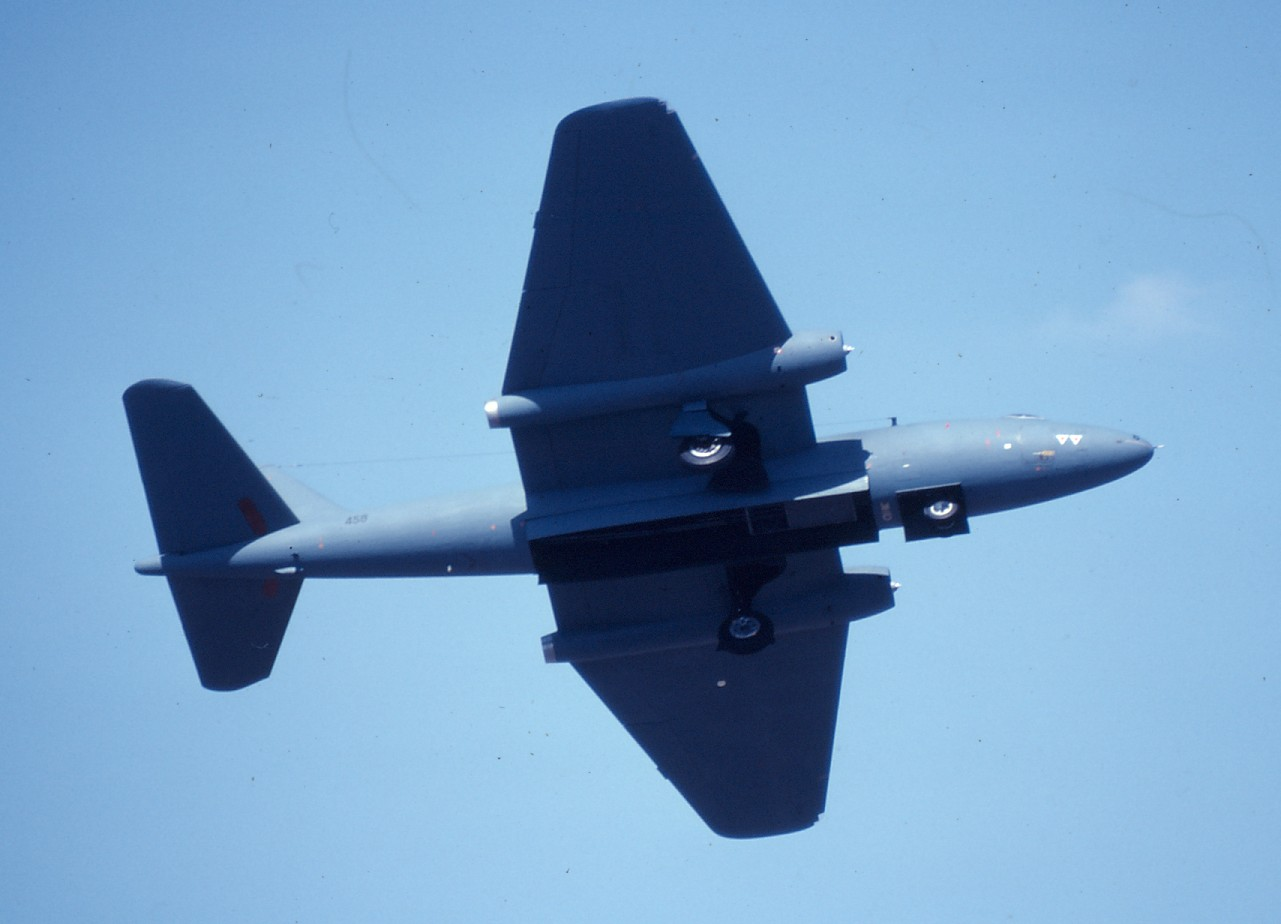
- A 12 Squadron Canberra T.4 in February 1982
- Active: 1939–1945? 1946–? 1963–1990
- Country: (South Africa)
- Branch: South African Air Force
- Engagements: World War II; South African Border War

Insignia
- Squadron Identification Code: VL 1942
- 12 Squadron Insignia

12 Squadron was a South African Air Force squadron that served in the Second World War in East Africa and the Western Desert as a medium bomber squadron. After the war, the squadron was used in various roles, including that of a helicopter squadron until 1963, when it was equipped with English Electric Canberra light bombers, remaining a light bomber and reconnaissance squadron until disbanded in 1990.

== History ==
12 Squadron was formed in December 1939. On 16 June 1940 it flew the first SAAF bombing raid against Italian forces in Abysinna when it attacked the town of Moyale using Junkers Ju 86 bombers. 12 Squadron later saw combat during the Second Battle of El Alamein operating Douglas Boston light bombers. In May 1941 the squadron converted to the Martin Maryland, and moved to Egypt. From then until the end of 1941 the squadron formed part of No.3 (S.A.A.F.) Wing (together with 24 Squadron SAAF and No. 113 Squadron RAF) and used its Marylands to attack Axis troop concentrations and bases.

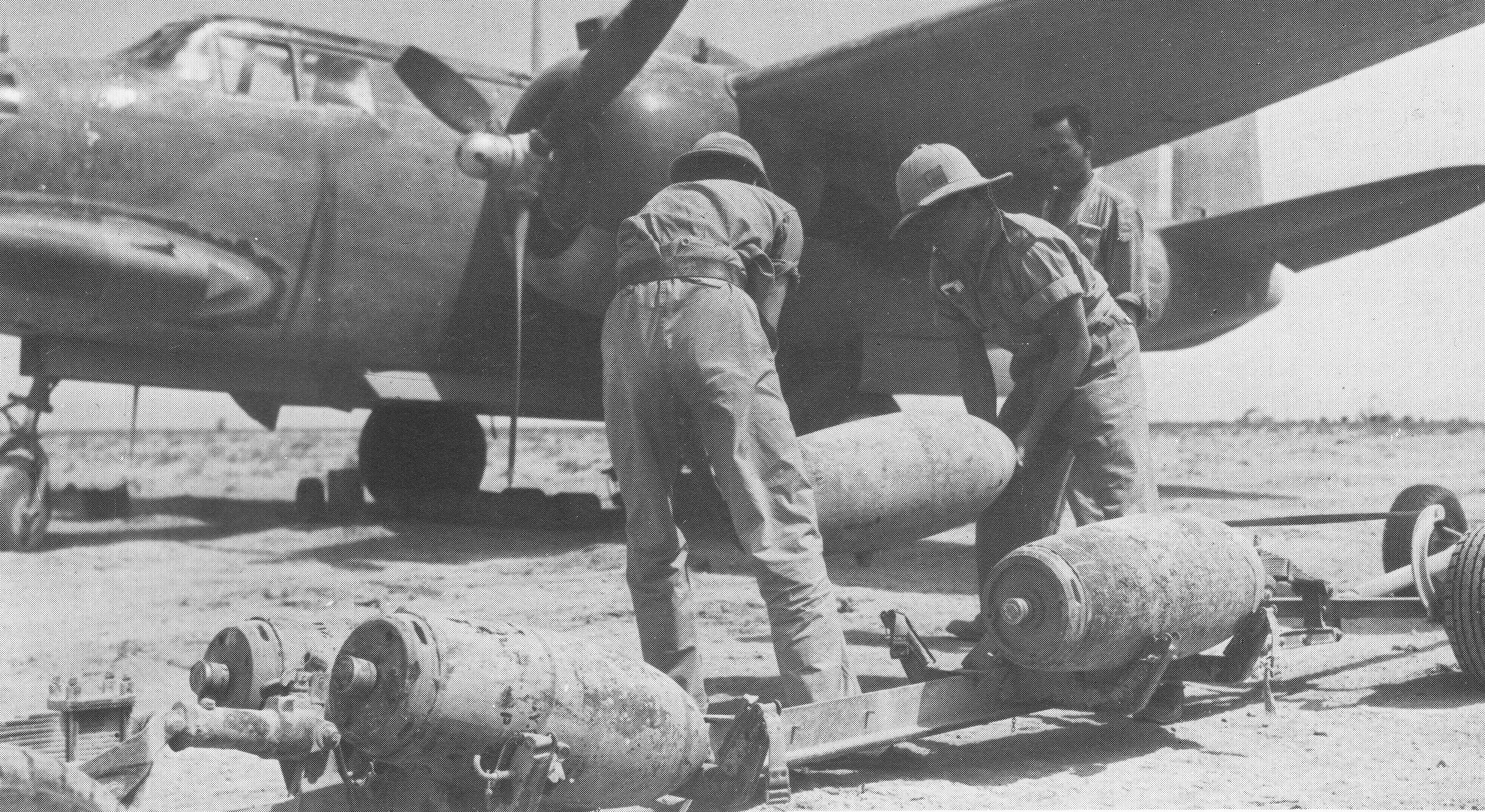
A 12 Squadron Boston medium bomber being armed in the Western Desert: 1942

In January 1942 the squadron received the Douglas Boston, using these aircraft on the same roles from 15 March 1942 until the final German surrender in Tunisia. The squadron then moved to Malta, from where it supported the fighting in Sicily and on the Italian mainland, before moving to Italy in October 1943. Assigned to No. 3 Wing with 21 and 24 squadrons.

The Bostons were retained until January 1944, when they were replaced with the new Martin Marauder. Both aircraft were used in a similar role, to attack enemy communications behind the front line, although the Marauder saw more service at day, and against strategic targets.

After the war the squadron flew its aircraft back to Egypt, where in November 1945 it disbanded.

Following the end of the war in Europe the squadron flew South African personnel home until it was disbanded.

12 Squadron was re-formed in October 1946 equipped with Avro Anson aircraft for anti-Tsetse fly spraying duties. It operated in this role in Zululand and Mtubatuba.

The squadron was later re-equipped with Sikorsky S-51 helicopters that were at times also utilised in anti-Tsetse fly spraying duties, it but was eventually made a flight of 28 Squadron.

The squadron was re-formed in late 1963 to operate English Electric Canberra bombers. It was the only SAAF squadron equipped with Canberras, and they were used as both tactical bombers and high-altitude reconnaissance aircraft. The squadron saw combat over Angola during the South African Border War, and remained active with these aircraft in 1981. 12 Squadron was disbanded in 1990.

Two ex-12 Squadron Canberras have been preserved by the SAAF.

== Aircraft ==
Aircraft flown by 12 Squadron
(not necessarily the exact aircraft type or actual aircraft belonging to the squadron.)
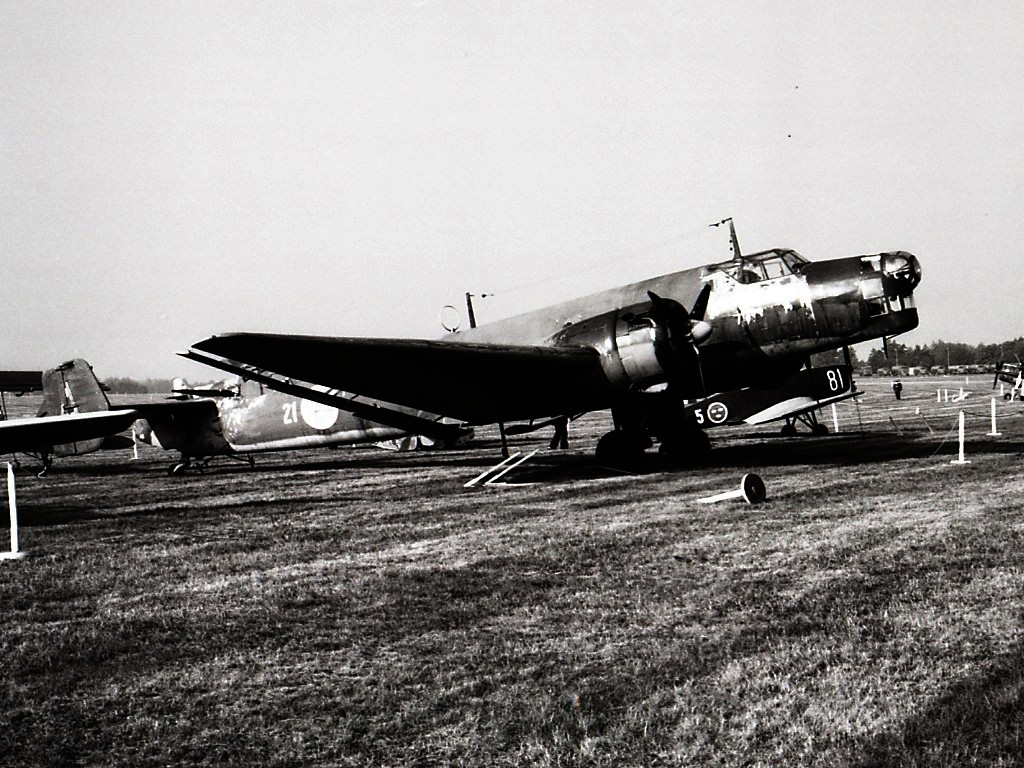
Junkers Ju.86
1940

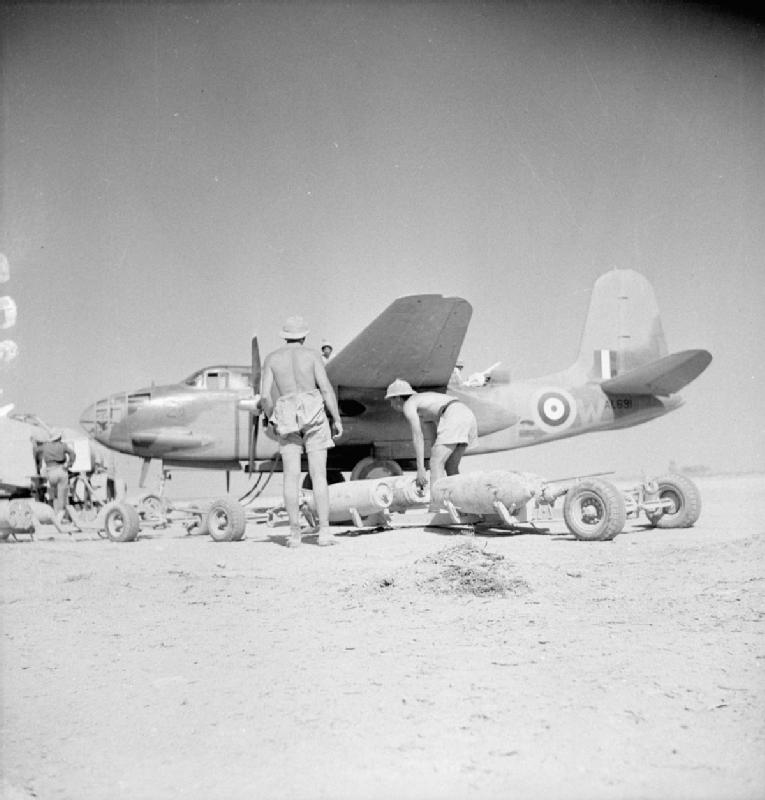
Boston Mk.III of 12 Sqn
-1943

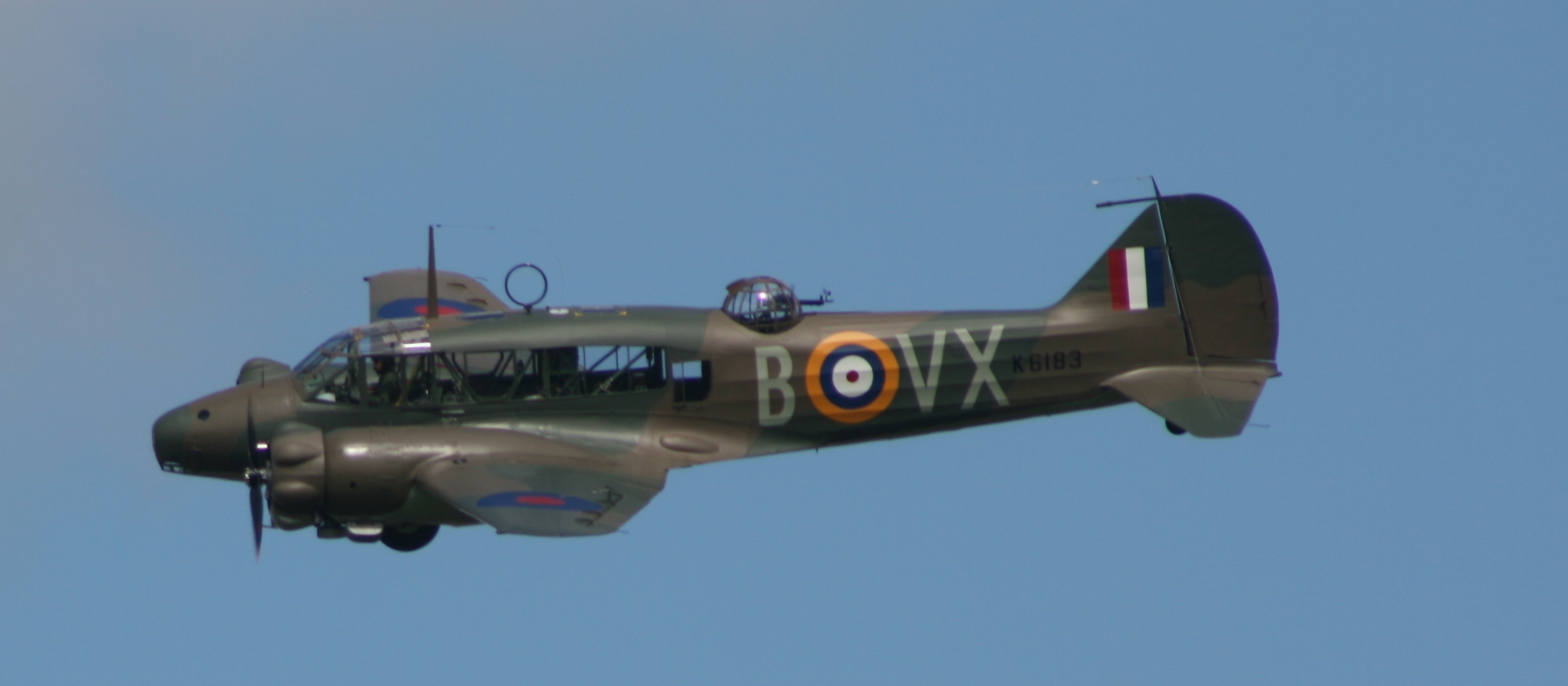
Avro Anson
1946–

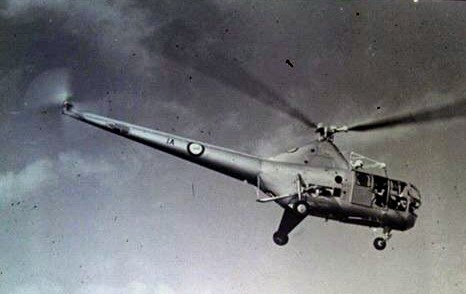
Sikorsky S-51
1954–

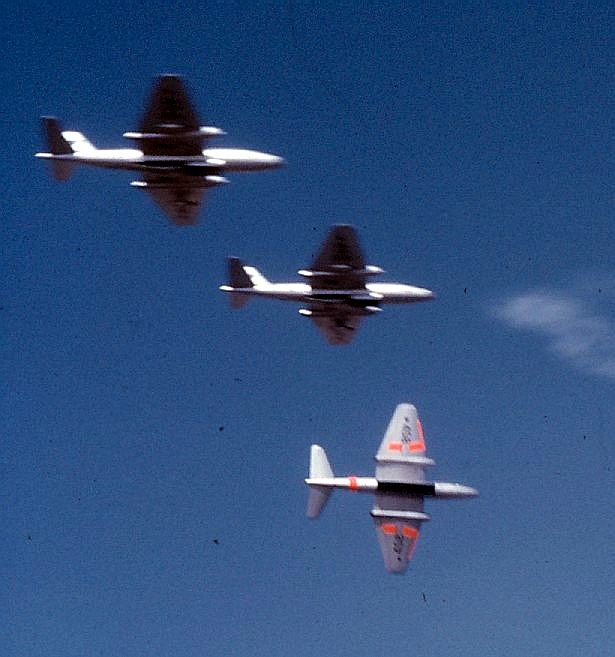
Canberra B(1)12 & T.4
1963–1990

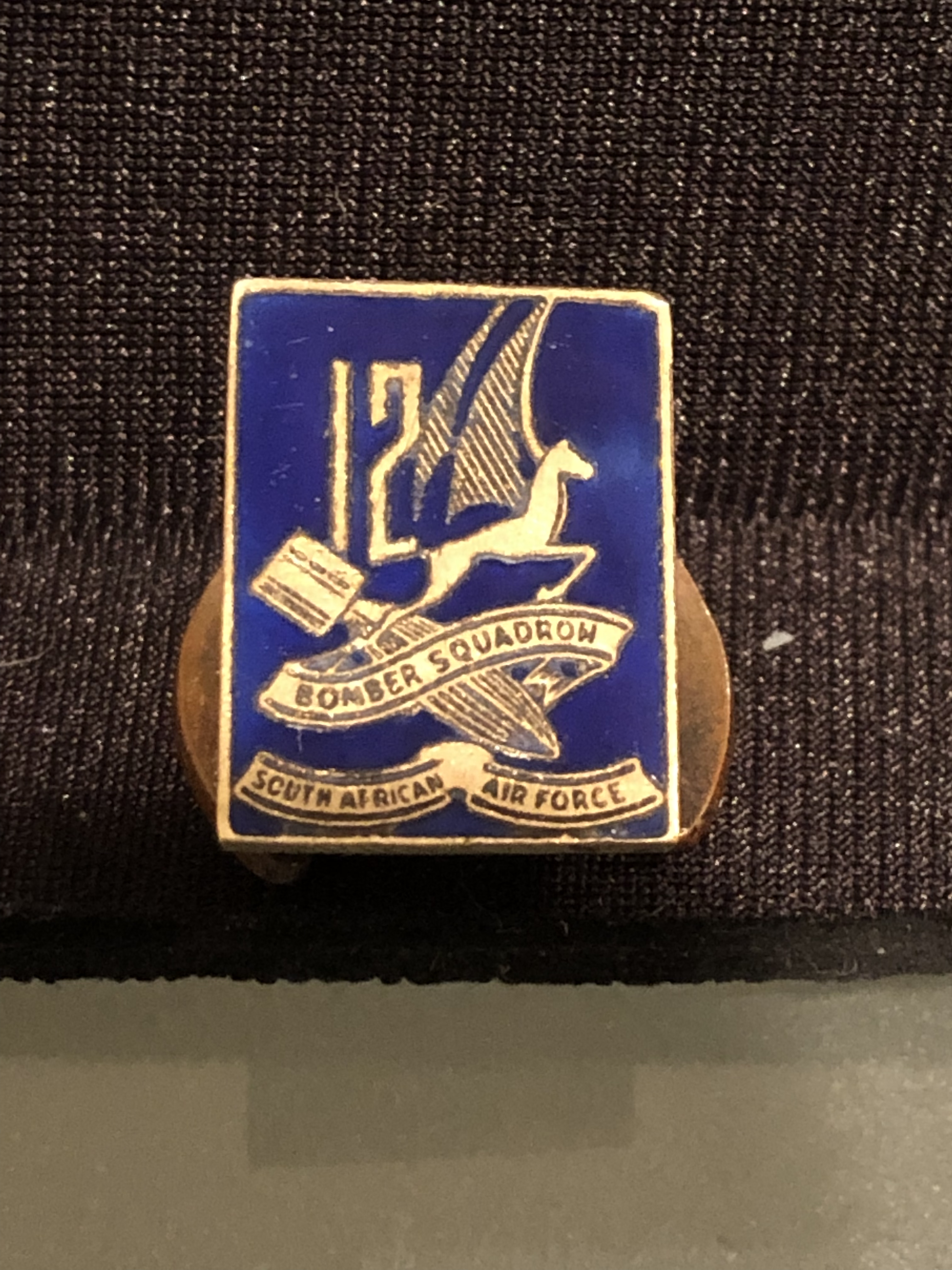
Lapel pin of the 12 Bomber Squadron of the South African Air Force during WW2
