= List of World War II aces from South Africa =

This is a list of fighter aces in World War II from South Africa.

== Aces ==
Name	Kills	Squadrons	Awards	Notes
Bailey, James R A	6½	264, 85, 125, 600	Distinguished Flying Cross (United Kingdom) DFC	Flew in Battle of Britain . Night fighter ace. Died 29 Feb. 2000.
Barber, Maurice C H	3	250 Sqn RAF and 450 Sqn RAAF	Distinguished Flying Cross (United Kingdom) DFC	Although it was considered to have achieved 5 wins, it seems that this total is only 3
Bosman, Andrew	10½	RAF: 72 Sqn; SAAF: 1 Sqn, 2 Sqn & 4 Sqn	Distinguished Service Order DSO Distinguished Flying Cross (United Kingdom) DFC	
Botha, Adriaan Jacobus "Attie"	5	SAAF: 1 Sqn		KIA 14 June 1941
Botha, Louis Cecil "Cookie"	5	SAAF: 5 Sqn		KIA 17 June 1942
Boyle, Brian John Lister "Piggy"	5½	SAAF: 1 Sqn	Distinguished Flying Cross (United Kingdom) DFC	
Bremner, Thomas Dick "Dikkie"	6	SAAF: 5 Sqn, 12 Sqn	Distinguished Service Order DSO Distinguished Flying Cross (United Kingdom) DFC	
Clements, Reginald John	2 & 2 shr.	No. 227 Sqn RAF.		
Collingwood, Robert Joseph Peter	5	RAF: 82 Sqn & 152 Sqn, SAAF: 1 Sqn	Distinguished Flying Cross (United Kingdom) DFC	
Cooke-Botha, Louis C	5	SAAF: 5 Sqn	Distinguished Flying Cross (United Kingdom) DFC	
Courtney, Tyler J	5	SAAF 5 Sqn	Distinguished Flying Cross (United Kingdom) DFC	
Davis, Carl Raymond	9	RAF: 601 Sqn	Distinguished Flying Cross (United Kingdom) DFC	KIA 6 September 1940
Dexter, Peter Grenfell	5	RAF: 16, 54, 603 & 611 Sqn	Distinguished Flying Cross (United Kingdom) DFC	KIFA 14 July 1941
Driver, Kenneth Weekes	12	SAAF: 1	Distinguished Flying Cross (United Kingdom) DFC	
Duncan, Andrew	5½	SAAF: 1 and 5	Distinguished Flying Cross (United Kingdom) DFC	
Duff-Richardson, Melville	5	SAAF: 4 Sqn	Distinguished Flying Cross (United Kingdom) DFC	
Faure, Johannes Morkel	5½	RAF: 92 Sqn; SAAF: 1 and 4 Sqns	Distinguished Service Order DSO Distinguished Flying Cross and Bar (United Kingdom) DFC & Bar	
Frost, John Everitt	15	3 and 5 SAAF	Distinguished Flying Cross and Bar (United Kingdom) DFC & Bar	
Gaynor, John Henry	5½	1, 2 and 7 SAAF	Distinguished Flying Cross (United Kingdom) DFC	
Golding, Douglas William	9	4 SAAF	Distinguished Flying Cross (United Kingdom) DFC	
Haysom, Geoffrey	6	79 RAF	Distinguished Service Order DSO Distinguished Flying Cross (United Kingdom) DFC	
Hewitson, John Loch	5	1, 4 and 5 SAAF	Distinguished Flying Cross (United Kingdom) DFC	
Hojem, R C	4	2 and 5 SAAF	Distinguished Flying Cross (United Kingdom) DFC	
Hugo, Petrus Hendrick "Piet"	17 & 3 shr., 3 prob., 7 dmg.	615 and 41 RAF	Distinguished Service Order DSO Distinguished Flying Cross and Bar (United Kingdom) DFC & Bar	
Human, Daniel William "Johnny"	5	1, 2 and 5 SAAF	Distinguished Service Order DSO Distinguished Flying Cross and Bar (United Kingdom) DFC & Bar	
Johnston, George Robert A M	9 & 2 shr.	RAF: 73 Sqn, 122 Wg.	Distinguished Service Order DSO Distinguished Flying Cross and Bar (United Kingdom) DFC & Bar Order of the British Empire MBE	
Lacey, Dennis Vernon D	6	2 and 5 SAAF	Distinguished Flying Cross (United Kingdom) DFC	
Lardner-Burke, Henry Patrick	8½	1, 19, 46, 126 and 222 RAF	Distinguished Flying Cross and Bar (United Kingdom) DFC & Bar	
Laubscher, Charles James	4 & 2 shr.	RAF: 261 Sqn., 2 SAAF		
Lewis, Albert Gerald	18	85, 249	Distinguished Flying Cross and Bar (United Kingdom) DFC & Bar	
Lindsay, Vernon Mears L.	5	2 SAAF	Distinguished Flying Cross (United Kingdom) DFC	
Loftus, D H	4 & 1 shr.	2, 7 SAAF	Distinguished Service Order DSO Distinguished Flying Cross (United Kingdom) DFC	
Malan, Adolph "Sailor"	35	74 RAF	Distinguished Service Order and Bar DSO & Bar Distinguished Flying Cross and Bar (United Kingdom) DFC & Bar	
Le Mesurier, G J	3	1 SAAF	Distinguished Flying Cross (United Kingdom) DFC	Although credited with 6 this appears to be the sum of his kills and probables
Metelerkamp, Peter	5	1 SAAF		
Morris, Douglas G "Zuba"	5	406 RCAF	Distinguished Service Order DSO Distinguished Flying Cross (United Kingdom) DFC	
Morris, E J	10	79, 238 and 250 RAF	Distinguished Service Order DSO Distinguished Flying Cross (United Kingdom) DFC	
Osler, Malcolm Stephen	12	145 and 601 RAF, 1 SAAF	Distinguished Flying Cross and Bar (United Kingdom) DFC & Bar	
Pare, Robin	6	1 and 5 SAAF	Distinguished Flying Cross (United Kingdom) DFC	
Pattle, Marmaduke "Pat"	41	80 and 33 RAF	Distinguished Flying Cross and Bar (United Kingdom) DFC & Bar	KIA 20 April 1941
Rabagliati, Alexander C	7	46 and 126 RAF	Distinguished Flying Cross and Bar (United Kingdom) DFC & Bar	
Robinson, McClelland Eric S	5½	1 SAAF	Distinguished Flying Cross (United Kingdom) DFC	
Le Roux, Johannes Jacobus	23½	73, 91, 111, 602 RAF	Distinguished Flying Cross and Bar (United Kingdom) DFC & Bar	
Saville, Eric Cowley	8	112 and 260 RAF; 2 and 5 SAAF	Distinguished Flying Cross and Bar (United Kingdom) DFC & Bar	
Seccombe, J T	3	1 SAAF	Distinguished Flying Cross (United Kingdom) DFC	
Smith, H F	3	5 SAAF and 1 SAAF		KIA 25/03/1943
Stapelton, Basil Gerald "Stapme"	6½	32, 247, 257 and 603 RAF	DFC (Dutch)	
Starret, Harry	6½	33 RAF		
Talbot, Robert Henry	10	274 RAF and 1 SAAF		
Theron, Servas van Breda	10	250 RAF and 3 SAAF	Distinguished Service Order DSO Distinguished Flying Cross (United Kingdom) DFC	Aces High only credits him with 5 destroyed, 3 & 6 shared
Van Mentz, Brian	7½	222 and 504 RAF	Distinguished Flying Cross (United Kingdom) DFC	
Wallace, Thomas Young	8	111 and 610 RAF	Distinguished Flying Medal DFM	
Waugh, Lawrence Robertson S	6	417 and 601 RAF, 1 SAAF	Distinguished Flying Cross (United Kingdom) DFC	
Whiting, S R	4	213 RAF	Distinguished Service Order DSO	
Wildsmith, H E N	4	2 SAAF	Distinguished Flying Cross (United Kingdom) DFC	
Wilmot, Laurence	4 & 1 shr.	1 SAAF, 238 Wg, 322 Wg.		
Wilson, Edward Taylor	3 & 4 shr.	1844 Sqn, FAA		

== See also ==
- List of World War II aces by country
- Military history of South Africa during World War II
- South African Air Force

== Notes ==
- Distinguished Flying Cross (United Kingdom) (DFC)
- Distinguished Flying Cross and Bar (United Kingdom) (DFC & Bar)
- Distinguished Flying Medal (1919-1993) (DFM)
- Distinguished Flying Medal and Bar (1919-1993) (DFM)
- Distinguished Service Order (DSO)
- Distinguished Service Order and Bar (DSO & Bar)
- Order of the British Empire (Member) (MBE)
- KIA - Killed in action
