= No. 7 (South African) Wing =

No. 7 Wing SAAF
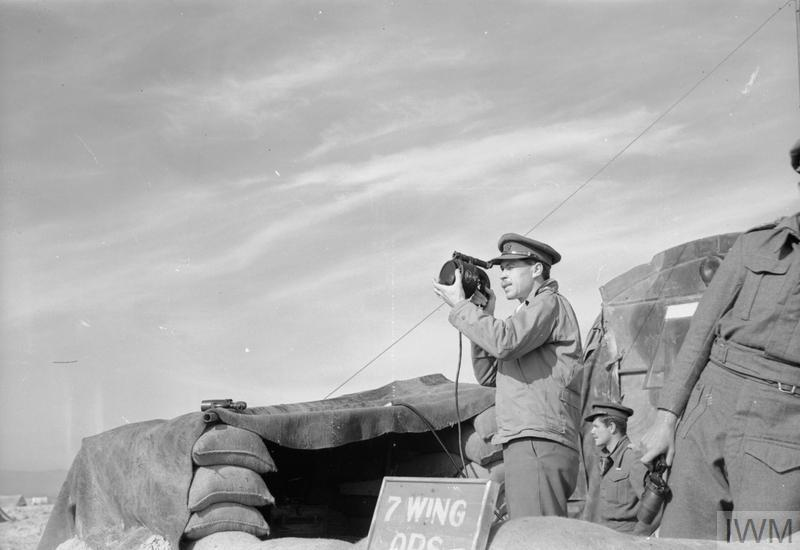
- Lt.Col. A C Bosman, 'sweep leader' (Wing Commander Flying) of No. 7 SAAF Wing, signals by Aldis lamp to pilot coming in to land at Trigno landing ground, Italy.
- Active: 1942 to 1945
- Country: South Africa
- Branch: South African Air Force
- Role: Fighter Bomber Wing

No. 7 Wing (SAAF) was a South African Airforce fighter-bomber air wing during World War II. The Wing served in the Western Desert and Italian campaigns. By the end of the North African campaign in May 1943, SAAF No 7 Wing, comprising 2, 4 & 5 Squadrons, was considered the best dive bomber formation in the world.

== Organisation and squadrons ==
7 Wing was initially a RAF Wing. In December 1942, 2, 4 and 5 Squadrons SAAF were placed in reserve and on 6 December 1942 they were assigned to 7 Wing SAAF under the command of Lt.Col. D.H. Loftus. It was the first time South African squadrons had operated together as a unified wing. The wing badge was a leaping Sprignbok on a green and yellow shield and was painted on the rudder of wing aircraft. In 1943 and 1944, the wing supported partisan operations in Yugoslavia. By Christmas 1944, the Wing was based at Forli near Bologna where it remained until the end of the war. It comprised the below squadrons during its existence:

No. 7 Wing SAAF organisation: 1941 - 1945
Date	Assigned Squadrons	Wing Commander	Higher formation
October 1942 (Initially 7 Wing RAF)	No. 80 Squadron RAF (Hurricane 2B); No. 127 Squadron RAF (Hurricane 2B); No. 274 Squadron RAF (Hurricane 2C); No. 335 (Greek) Squadron (Hurricane 2B)	Lt. Col. D.H. Loftus	No. 212 Group RAF
February 1943	2 Squadron SAAF (Kittyhawk I); 4 Squadron SAAF (Kittyhawk I); 5 Squadron SAAF (Kittyhawk III)	Lt. Col. D.H. Loftus; Lt. Col. J.D. Human	No. 212 Group RAF
July 1944	2 Squadron SAAF (Spitfire V); 4 Squadron SAAF (Spitfire V); 5 Squadron SAAF (Kittyhawk III)	Lt. Col. Johnny D. Human; Col. D.D. Moodie	Desert Airforce
May 1945	1 Squadron SAAF (Spitfire IX); 2 Squadron SAAF (Spitfire IX); 4 Squadron SAAF (Spitfire IX); 7 Squadron SAAF (Spitfire IX)	Lt. Col. A C Bosman	Mediterranean Allied Tactical Airforce
