= John Frost (SAAF officer) =

South African World War II flying ace

John Everitt Frost
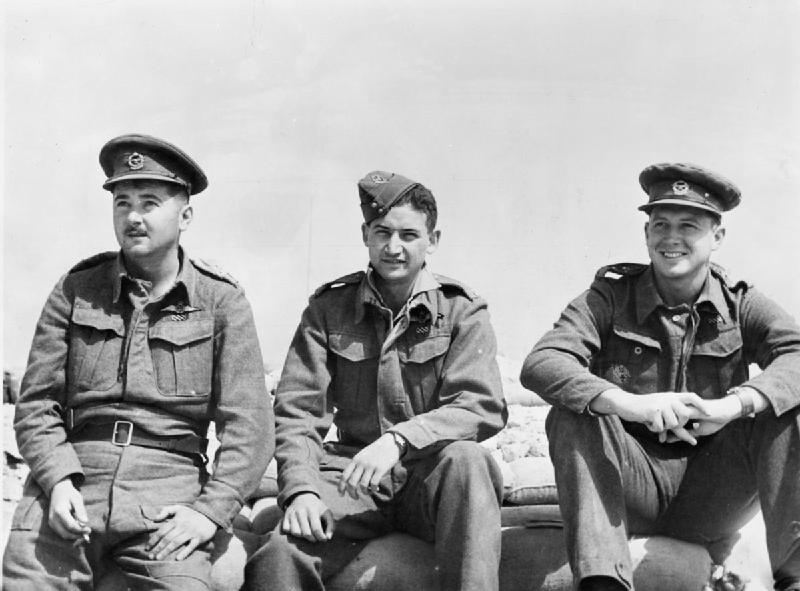
- Major John Frost (centre), commander of No. 5 Squadron, sitting between two of his most experienced pilots, Lieutenant Robin Pare (left) and Captain Andrew Duncan, Egypt, March/April 1942. All three were missing or killed in action by the end of June.
- Born: 16 July 1918; Queenstown, Eastern Cape, South Africa
- Died: 16 June 1942 (aged 23); Missing in Action near Bir Hakeim, Egypt
- Military career
- Allegiance: South Africa
- Branch: South African Air Force
- Service years: 1936–1942
- Rank: Major
- Nickname: "Jack"
- Unit: No. 3 Squadron SAAF (1940–42)
- Commands: No. 5 Squadron SAAF (1942)
- Conflicts: Second World War: East African Campaign; North African Campaign
- Awards: Distinguished Flying Cross & Bar

John Everitt Frost, DFC & Bar (16 July 1918 – 16 June 1942) was a South African fighter ace during the Second World War. He was the highest-scoring member of a South African Air Force squadron during the war, credited with the destruction of 15 Axis aircraft. South African pilots with higher numbers of kills, such as Pat Pattle and Adolph "Sailor" Malan, were members of the British Royal Air Force.

== War time service ==
Frost joined the South African Air Force (SAAF) in 1936, at the age of 18. By 1940 he had achieved the rank of captain, and was a member of No. 3 Squadron.

=== East African Campaign ===
In early 1941, the unit—flying Hawker Hurricanes—was dispatched to combat Italian forces during the East African Campaign. On 22 February 1941, Frost destroyed four Fiat CR.42 fighters, an action for which he was awarded the Distinguished Flying Cross.

On 15 March 1941, Frost was shot down by anti-aircraft fire while strafing Diredawa airfield. His wingman, Lieutenant Bob Kershaw landed his aircraft in a nearby field, while other 3 Sqn pilots fired on Italian infantry attempting to capture the pair. Kershaw escaped in his aircraft with Frost sitting on his lap, an action for which Kershaw was awarded the Distinguished Service Order.

The campaign ended effectively in November 1941 with the final defeat of the Italian Forces in East Africa. The squadron returned to South Africa and was disbanded.

=== North African Campaign ===
Frost, promoted to major, was appointed commander of No. 5 Squadron, flying P-40 Kittyhawks. From March 1942 the squadron participated in the North African Campaign, with the Desert Air Force. No. 5 Squadron joined No. 2 and No. 4 Squadrons in No. 233 Wing; the main role of the SAAF fighters at the time was highly dangerous bomber escort missions, supporting No. 3 (Bomber) Wing SAAF.

The squadron was assigned to the Sollum-Mersa Matruh sector. On 11 May, Frost and his wingman Lieutenant Ken Whyte shared the destruction of a lone Heinkel He 111 bomber attacking a convoy bound for Malta. Whyte described the action: "I remember our first combat together. While on a shipping patrol we were vectored on to a He 111. Jack made his favourite three-quarter attack which had brought him success in Abyssinia. I attacked from the rear. We each claimed half a share in its destruction." On 16 May, Frost destroyed a Junkers Ju 88, for his ninth victory, but was hit by cannon fire damaging his port elevator.

On 28 May 1942, he was involved in a shared victory over a Messerschmitt Bf 109, his first. (The pilot, Feldwebel Willi Langer was killed.) At this stage, Frost's total tally stood at 15 Axis aircraft destroyed.

Frost was appointed commander of No. 233 Wing on 31 May, but his replacement at 5 Squadron, Andrew Duncan, was shot down and killed by Oberleutnant Otto Schulz.

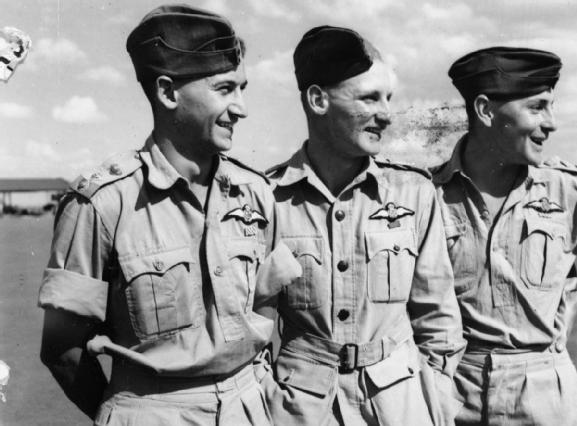
Frost (left)

On 16 June, whilst escorting Douglas Bostons, Frost and other P-40 pilots encountered Bf 109s from Jagdgeschwader 27, near Bir Hakeim, Egypt. Rod Hojem, one of the South African pilots involved in this combat commented: "There was one hell of a dogfight, and after it was over I can clearly remember Jack calling up the squadron on the R/T, "Form up chaps I am heading North", and that was the last we heard of him." Frost's aircraft and remains have never been found, and his fate remains unclear. Some sources suggest that Frost fell victim to one of the most prominent German aces, Hans-Joachim Marseille, who scored six of his 158 victories that same day. It has also been suggested that another German Experte, Günter Steinhausen (who claimed four kills that day) may have shot down Frost.

== See also ==
- List of people who disappeared mysteriously (2000–present)
- List of World War II aces from South Africa
