= Haysom =

Haysom is a surname. Notable people with the surname include:

- Elizabeth Haysom (born 1964), Canadian murderer
- Geoffrey Haysom (1917–1979), South African flying ace of World War II
- Mark Haysom (born 1953), British businessman
- Melville Haysom (1900–1968), Australian artist, sculptor, instructor and musician
- Nicholas Haysom (1952–2026), South African lawyer and diplomat
- Wally Haysom (1897–1982), Australian rules footballer
