= Adriaan Botha =

Adriaan Botha may refer to:

- Adriaan Botha (sprinter) (born 1977), South African sprinter
- Adriaan Botha (SAAF officer) (1921–1941), South African flying ace

== See also ==
- Riaan Botha (born 1970), South African pole vaulter
