= Robin Pare =

South African WWII flying ace

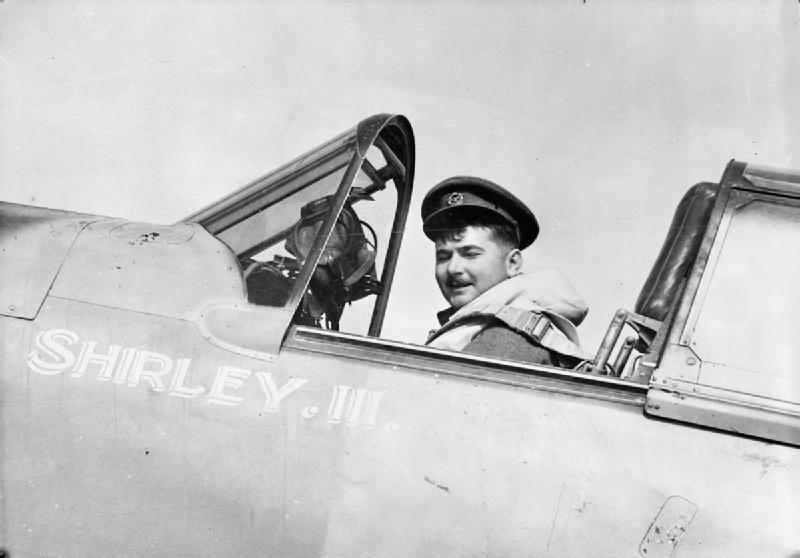
- Born: 16 July 1919; Wynberg
- Died: 3 June 1942 (aged 22)
- Burial place: Benghazi War Cemetery, Benghazi, Libya
- Military career
- Branch: South African Air Force
- Rank: Captain
- Service number: P202945V
- Conflicts: World War II

Robin Pare (16 July 1919 – 3 June 1942) was a South African flying ace of World War II, credited with five 'kills'.

He was born in Wynberg, near Cape Town, in 1919. He joined the Permanent Force in 1939 and went to Military College, receiving his commission in April 1940. He joined 1 Squadron SAAF in May 1940 in East Africa, where he stayed until April 1941.

He returned to South Africa as an instructor until October 1941 when he joined 5 Squadron SAAF in December 1941.

== Death ==
He was shot down on 3 June 1942 by Hans-Joachim Marseille.
