= Kenneth Driver =

Kenneth Weekes Driver
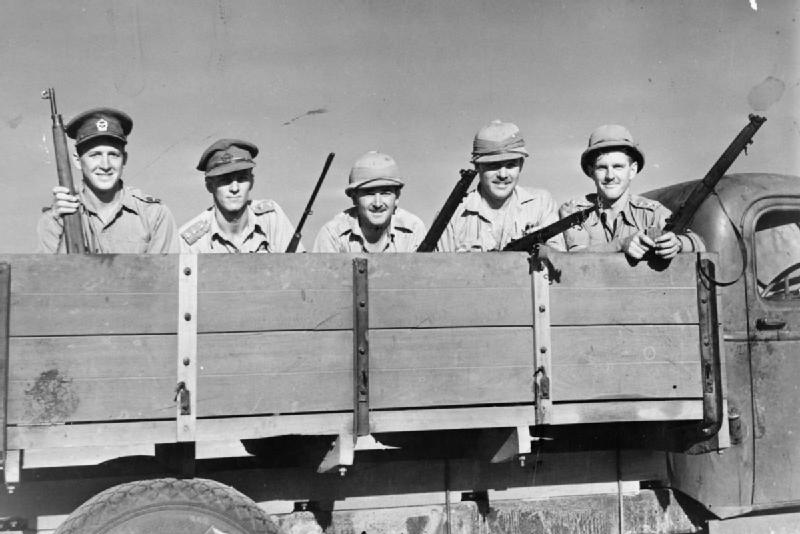
- Driver, 2nd from left
- Born: April 3, 1918; Brooklyn, Pretoria
- Died: February 3, 1947 (aged 28)
- Burial place: Bath, England
- Military career
- Branch: South African Air Force
- Rank: Major
- Service number: Royal Air Force- East Africa Command, 1940-1945. CM742.jpg
- Unit: 1 Squadron SAAF
- Conflicts: World War II
- Awards: Distinguished Flying Cross

Kenneth Weekes Driver (1918-1947) was a South African Air Force pilot and fighter ace during World War II who recorded 10 'kills'

At the start of the war, he was a flying instructor in the SAAF before serving with 6 Squadron on Home Defence. In December 1939, he joined 1 Squadron as a Flight Commander.

He was shot down in on 14 June 1941, spending the rest of the war as a Prisoner of War in Stalag Luft III. His opponent was the German ace Ludwig Franzisket of JG 27. The air battle was fought singularly, in a one-versus-one situation. Both men fired at each other, but only the German scored hits. Franzisket got too close and struck Driver's tail with a wing tip, damaging it. Franzisket remained ignorant of the collision, as did Driver, who was preparing to bail out, until after they met. Franzisket showed Driver around the damaged Bf 109. The driver showed Franzisket a picture and a lock of hair belonging to his wife, who had come to visit him in Cairo. The German promised to have a message dropped via container over his airfield informing her that Driver lived.

After the war he stayed in the SAAF but was killed in a flying accident in 1947 while attending a course.

== See also ==
- List of World War II aces from South Africa
