= Brian Boyle (SAAF officer) =

Brian John Lister Boyle, DFC
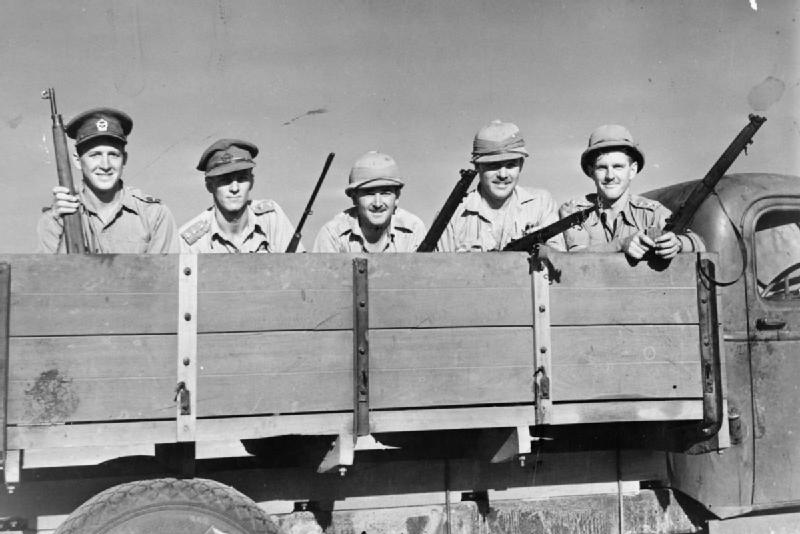
- Born: 24 January 1917; East London Cape Province, Union of South Africa
- Died: 1993
- Military career
- Branch: South African Air Force
- Rank: Brigadier
- Nickname: Piggy
- Service number: P102647V
- Commands: 4 Air School; 4 Squadron SAAF
- Conflicts: World War II
- Awards: Distinguished Flying Cross

Brian John Lister Boyle, DFC (1917-1993) was a South African flying ace of World War II, credited with 5 'kills'.

Boyle was commissioned into the South African Air Force in 1938 and in 1940 was posted to 1 Squadron SAAF in Eritrea, flying a Gladiator. He single handedly engaged 8 Fiat CR.42's on 6 November 1941 and crash landed injured. He received a DFC for this engagement in January 1942. He returned to South Africa at the end of March 1942 as an instructor. In February 1944 he joined 4 Squadron SAAF, flying the Spitfire Mk. V. Boyle was appointed Officer Commanding in April 1944. He was posted to Headquarters in July 1944 and then on to 4 Air School as Commanding Officer.

After the war he remained in the SAAF and retired as a Brigadier. He died in 1993.
