= Robert Talbot =

Robert Talbot may refer to:

- Robert Talbot (conductor) (1893–1954), Canadian conductor, composer, and violinist
- Robert Talbot (footballer) (1908–1971), English footballer
- Robert Talbot (scribe) (died 1558), Ango-Saxon scribe
- Robert Talbot (SAAF officer) (1916-1941), World War II ace
- Sir Robert Talbot, 2nd Baronet (died 1670), Irish landowner, soldier and politician
