= Andrew Bosman =

South African World War II flying ace

Andrew Christiaan Bosman
- Born: May 16, 1917; Bloemhof, South Africa
- Died: April 17, 1947 (aged 29); Khartoum, Sudan
- Burial place: Khartoum War Cemetery
- Military career
- Branch: South African Air Force
- Rank: Major
- Service number: P102696V
- Commands: No. 3 Squadron, SAAF; No. 7 Wing, SAAF
- Awards: Distinguished Service Order; Distinguished Flying Cross

Andrew Bosman (16 May 1917 – 16 May 1947) was a South African flying ace of World War II, credited with shooting down at least eight aircraft. He was killed in a postwar flying accident.

== Biography ==
Andrew Christiaan Bosman, born on 16 May 1917 in Bloemhof in the Transvaal, South Africa, joined the Permanent Force before World War II and later joined the South African Air Force (SAAF). He joined the SAAF's No. 3 Squadron in the Western Desert in 1941, becoming its commander in April 1942. He was awarded the Distinguished Flying Cross the same month, but his tour as leader of the squadron was cut short.

After a break from operations he joined No. 72 Squadron in December 1943. He later became Wing Commander (Flying) of No. 7 Wing, SAAF. He was awarded the Distinguished Service Order in November 1944.

In July 1945 he took command of the wing and was promoted to colonel but VJ Day stopped his deployment to the Far East. He is credited with the destruction of eight aircraft, with a further three destroyed in combination with other pilots. He also claimed one aircraft as probably destroyed and damaged three others. Three aircraft, one shared, were destroyed on the ground.

After the war, he remained in the SAAF, and went back to the rank of major in command of No. 1 Squadron. He was killed on 17 April 1947 when a Lockheed Ventura transport aircraft, ferrying pilots to collect Spitfires in England, crashed at Khartoum, in Sudan.
