= Servaas Theron =

Servaas Theron SD, SM, DSO and Bar, DFC, AFC
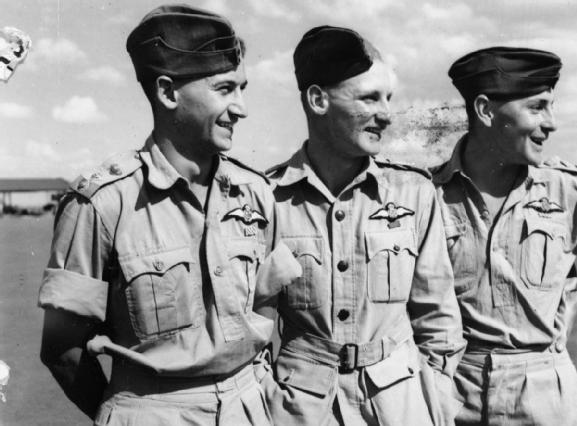
- Theron (right)
- Born: 9 May 1918; Tulbagh, Western Cape
- Died: 14 March 1986 (aged 67); Pretoria, Gauteng
- Military career
- Allegiance: South Africa
- Branch: South African Air Force
- Service years: 1938–1970
- Rank: Brigadier
- Service number: P102649
- Commands: 2 Squadron SAAF; 250 Squadron
- Conflicts: World War II; Korean War
- Awards: Distinguished Service Order; Distinguished Flying Cross; Air Force Cross

Servaas van Breda Theron (9 May 1918 – 14 March 1986) was a South African World War II fighter ace, credited with 10 'kills'.

== World War II ==
He joined the Permanent Force in 1938. After flight training he was posted to 1 Squadron SAAF in 1940, before being posted as a flight commander to 2 Squadron SAAF in October that year. He later went to 3 Squadron SAAF, staying there until May 1941. While there he scored 5 aerial victories and took part in destroying 8 on the ground, earning a DFC in March 1941. On 13 March 1941, Theron landed alongside a Hawker Hurricane that had run out of fuel and siphoned petrol from his plane into the stranded plane and both planes made a getaway. On their return to base, they found the airfield under attack. Both Theron and the pilot he rescued shot down a Fiat CR.42.

He returned to South Africa, becoming Chief Flying Instructor at the Central Flying School in 1943. He then went to the Mediterranean, joining No. 450 Squadron RAAF for a short period. In August 1943 he took command of 250 Squadron until April 1944. He was awarded the DSO in June 1944.

== Later career ==
After the war he returned to South Africa and stayed in the South African Air Force. In 1946 he was awarded the Air Force Cross. He went on to command 2 Squadron SAAF and served in the Korean War from September 1950 to March 1951, flying Mustangs. He received a Bar to his DSO for his service in Korea.

He was then posted as an instructor at AFB Langebaanweg. He served as Director of Operations for the SAAF before his retirement in 1970.

After retiring from the Air Force he became Chairman of Hawker Siddeley International.

== Awards and decorations ==
- Southern Cross Decoration (SD)
- Southern Cross Medal (1952) (SM)
- Korea Medal (South Africa)
- Union Medal
- Distinguished Service Order and Bar (DSO & Bar)
- Distinguished Flying Cross and Bar (United Kingdom) (DFC & Bar)
- Air Force Cross (United Kingdom) (AFC)
- (Code: 1939_45Star Not found)
- Africa Star
- Defence Medal (United Kingdom)
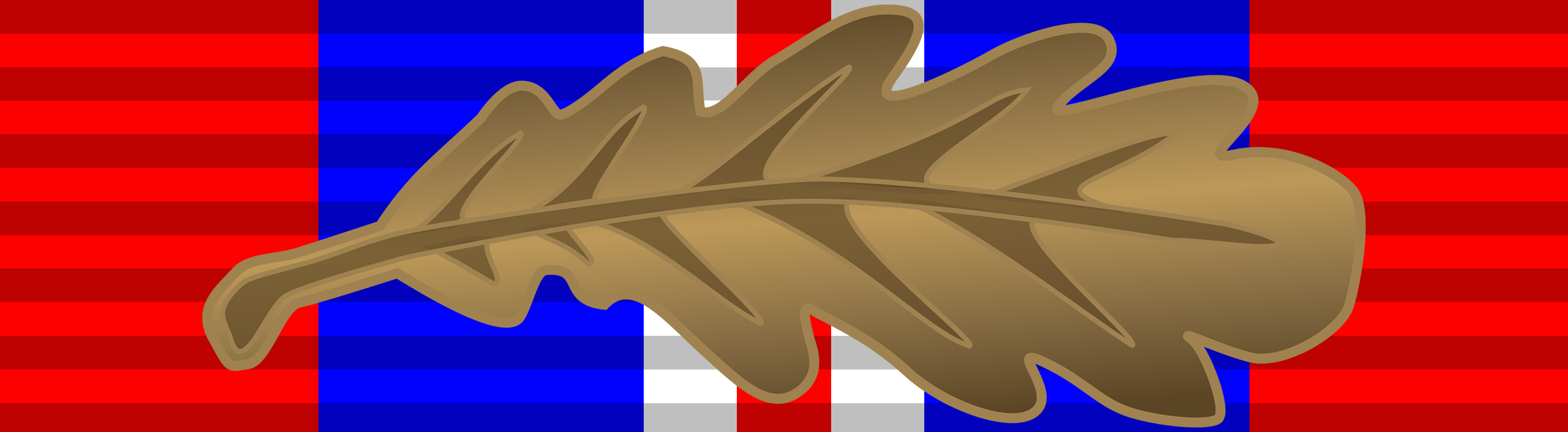
- War Medal 1939 – 1945 (Mentioned in Dispatches) (MID)
- Africa Service Medal (WWII)
- United Nations Service Medal (Korea)
- Korean War Service Medal
