= Dennis Lacey =

South African flying ace

Dennis Vernon Dold Lacey
- Born: 6 November 1919; Karoi, Rhodesia
- Died: 7 August 1942 (aged 22)
- Military career
- Branch: South African Air Force
- Rank: Major
- Service number: P203185V
- Commands: 5 Squadron SAAF
- Conflicts: World War II
- Awards: Distinguished Flying Cross

Dennis Vernon Dold Lacey (1919-1942) was a South African flying ace of World War II, credited with 5 'kills' and 2 probables.

Lacey was born in Rhodesia but grew up in Cape Town. He joined the Permanent Force in July 1940 in the South African Air Force. He joined 2 Squadron SAAF in 1941 and was awarded a DFC. He was posted to 6 Squadron SAAF in South Africa till June 1942 before being posted to 5 Squadron SAAF in the Western Desert. He was promoted to Officer Commanding in July 1942.

He was killed on 7 August 1942 when we was shot down after being hit by flak.
