= Douglas Golding =

South African flying ace

Douglas William Golding
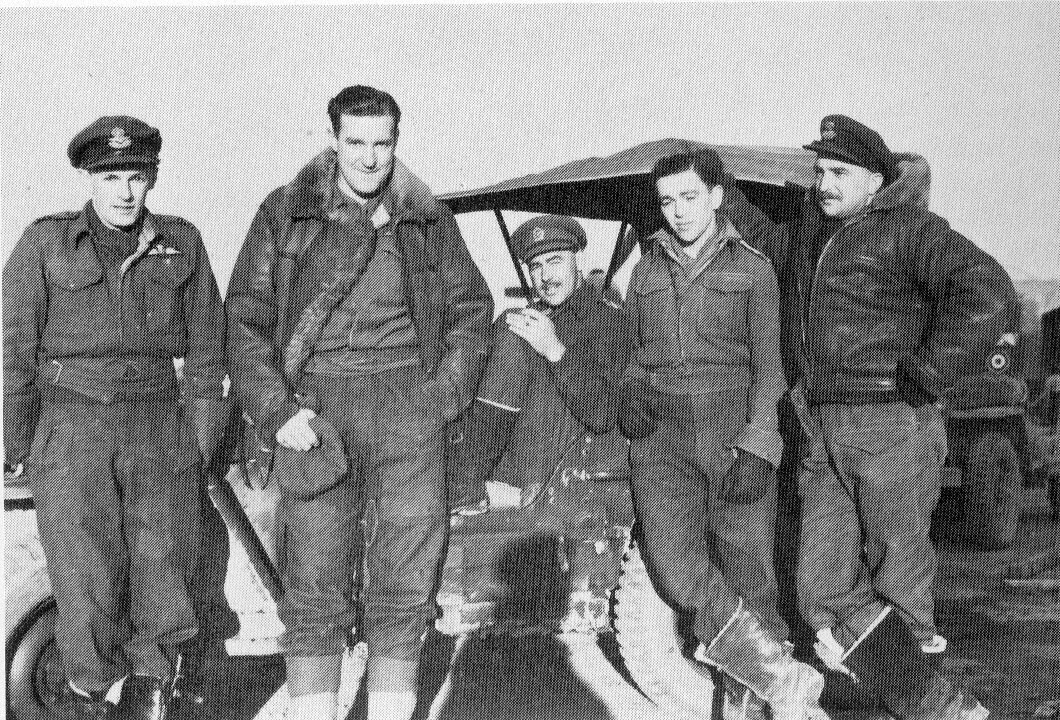
- Golding (2nd from right)
- Born: 9 April 1919; Durban, South Africa
- Military career
- Branch: South African Air Force
- Rank: Major
- Service number: 103112V
- Commands: 4 Squadron SAAF
- Awards: Distinguished Flying Cross

Douglas William Golding (born 9 April 1919) is a South African flying ace of World War II, credited with three 'kills'.

Golding joined the South African Air Force in 1940 and joined 3 Squadron SAAF flying Mohawks but in 1941 he moved to 4 Squadron SAAF in the Western Desert, flying Tomahawks. In April 1942 he returned to South Africa, flying anti submarine patrols off Durban with 10 Squadron SAAF.

He was awarded a DFC in 1942.

In October 1942 he was posted to 4 Squadron, becoming a flight commander in November 1942. He became Commanding Officer of the squadron in June 1943. The squadron converted to Spitfire Mk V's in July 1943. In October 1943 he was evacuated with malaria. On his recovery he was part of an Army/Air training team at Middle East Command until he went to Italy to command 73 Squadron in the Balkans until February 1945.

After a recurrence of his malaria, he returned to South Africa and was demobilised in 1946. He became an architect in Durban, until his retirement in 1984.
