= Peter Metelerkamp =

South African WWII flying ace

Peter Carel Rex Metelerkamp
- Born: 4 December 1918; London, England
- Died: 13 December 1942 (aged 24); Libya
- Burial place: Benghazi War Cemetery
- Military career
- Branch: South African Air Force
- Rank: Major
- Service number: P102668V
- Conflicts: World War II; Battle of Alam el Halfa

Peter Metelerkamp was a South African flying ace of World War II, credited with 5 'kills'.

Born in England, his parents returned to South Africa and lived in Knysna. He joined the Special Service Battalion in 1936 before moving to the Military College. He went on to join the South African Air Force, qualifying as a pilot in 1938. He joined 1 Squadron SAAF in March 1942, in the Western Desert, flying Hurricanes

He was injured during the Battle of Alam el Halfa and was hospitalised. He returned to the squadron in November 1942, transitioning to Spitfires. He was appointed Officer Commanding on 13 November.

He was killed on 13 December when his aircraft was hit and he crashed into the sea. He was buried at Benghazi War Cemetery.
