= Laurence Wilmot =

Laurence Aubrey Wilmot
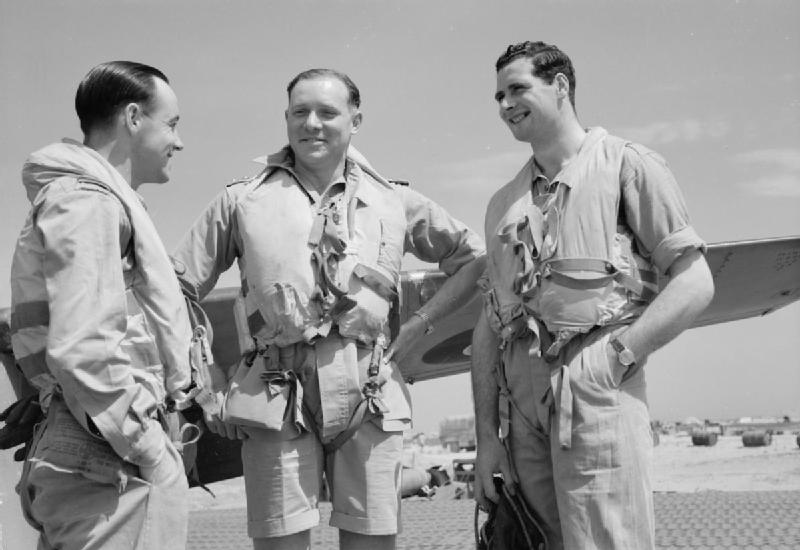
- Wilmot (centre)
- Born: 31 May 1914; Pretoria
- Died: 13 December 1947 (aged 33); Waterkloof AFB, Pretoria
- Military career
- Branch: South African Air Force
- Rank: Colonel
- Service number: P102596V
- Conflicts: World War II
- Awards: Distinguished Service Order; Distinguished Flying Cross

Laurence 'Laurie' Wilmot (31 May 1914 – 13 December 1947) was a South African flying ace of World War II, credited with 4 'kills'.

He joined the South African Air Force and in 1940 took command of 3 Squadron SAAF but soon moved to 1 Squadron SAAF, fighting in Eritrea. He was shot down in February 1941 and was captured. He was a POW until Eritrea fell to the Allies in April 1941. He returned to command 1 Squadron, who were in Egypt, on 30 June 1941. In November 1941 was appointed Commanding Officer of 2 Squadron, flying Tomahawks. He was awarded the DFC in December 1941. He was then posted to South Africa until June 1943. He was then posted to 322 Wing followed by 239 Wing. He was awarded a DSO in August 1944.

After the war he commanded 7 Wing from July 1946.

He was killed in an aircraft accident on 26 June 1947.
