= Gerald Le Mesurier =

Gerald John Le Mesurier
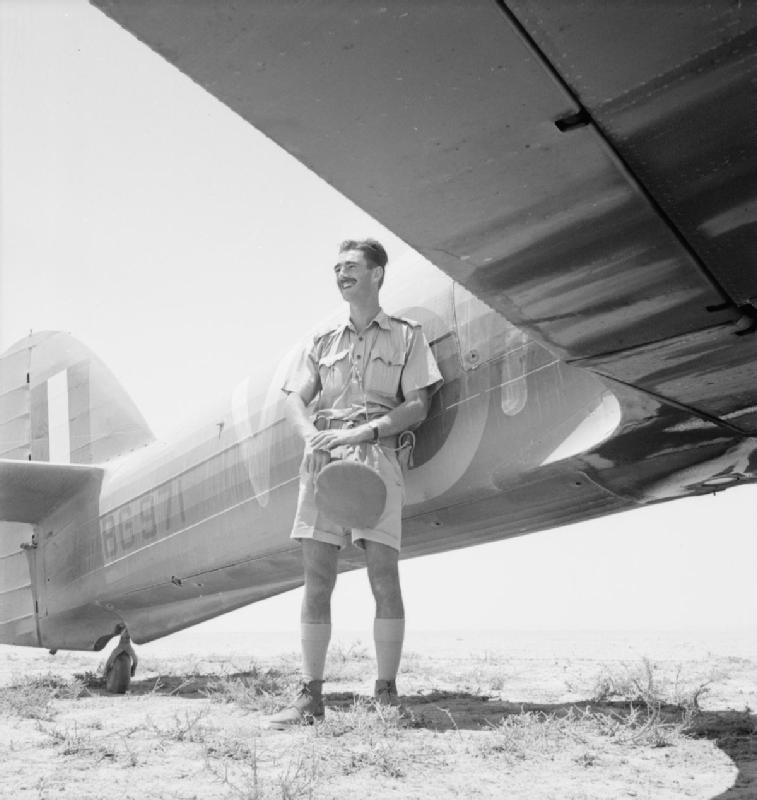
- Born: 27 June 1914
- Died: 8 July 1943 (aged 29)
- Burial place: Brookwood Military Cemetery
- Military career
- Branch: South Africa
- Rank: Major
- Nickname: Lemmie
- Service number: P102636V
- Commands: 1 Squadron SAAF
- Awards: Distinguished Flying Cross

Gerald John Le Mesurier DFC (1914-1943) was a South African flying ace of World War II, credited with 3 'kills'.

After completing his schooling at Diocesan College in Cape Town, he studied at the University of Cape Town. He joined the Special Service Battalion in 1936 but later in 1936 transferred to the South African Military College, joining the South African Air Force.

He joined 1 Squadron SAAF in November 1940, in East Africa, as a flight commander. He served as temporary Officer Commanding on his arrived and then again in 1941. He was appointed OC in May 1942. He was shot down in July 1942 and hospitalised and was declared unfit to fly in November 1942 and returned to South Africa.

He was awarded a DFC in April 1943. He flew to England to attend a course and receive his medal but was killed in a flying accident.

== Record ==
He was credited with 3 kills, 1 probable and 1 damaged.
