= Bob Kershaw =

Robert HC Kershaw DSO DFC
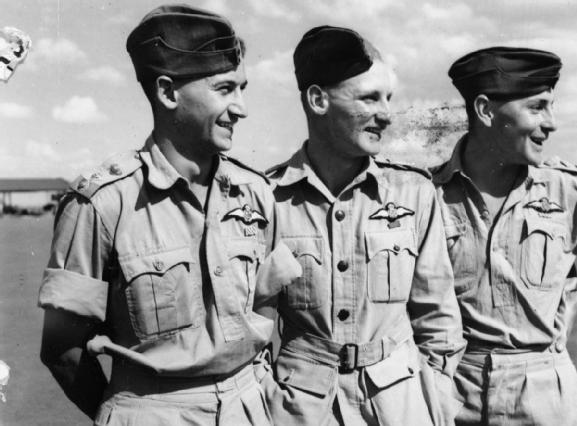
- Bob Kershaw (centre) with John Frost (left) and Captain S v.B Theron (right)
- Died: 6 May 1998
- Military career
- Branch: South African Air Force
- Rank: Major
- Nickname: Bob
- Conflicts: World War II
- Awards: Distinguished Service Order; Distinguished Flying Cross

Robert H. C. (Bob) Kershaw DSO DFC (died 6 May 1998) was a fighter pilot and later businessman of South Africa, notable as the first South African recipient of the Distinguished Service Order in World War II, for his rescue of downed squadron leader John Frost.

Kershaw and Frost were flying Hawker Hurricanes in the No. 3 Squadron of the South African Air Force when they were sent to Kenya in early 1941 as part of a campaign against Italian forces in Abyssinia. On 15 March, during an attack on Diredawa airfield, Frost's tank of glycol coolant was hit. Frost proceeded to land quickly before the overheating engine seized. Frost landed at a satellite airfield near Diredawa, and set his plane on fire to prevent its capture. Kershaw had seen Frost go down and followed, putting his plane down on the same field.

Due to size constraints in the Hurricane, Frost discarded his parachute and sat in Kershaw's lap. With Kershaw working the rudder's foot pedals and Jack using the throttle and control stick, they were able to take off and return to base.

The rescue was a sensation in South Africa, Kershaw receiving an immediate DSO. A portrait was painted (it now hangs in the South African National War Museum), and his image was in turn adapted for a 1 1/2-pence postage stamp issued in August 1942.

Kershaw returned to flying, and eventually rose to the rank of Major. He flew the Supermarine Spitfire after they were delivered to the SAAF. Later he and his engineer would design the prototype twin payload bomb rack for the Spitfire, as it was ineffectual with a single payload. He was shot down and captured later. He received a Distinguished Flying Cross.

After the war he went into the automobile business in East London, becoming managing director of Grosvenor Ford. He later retired to Knysna, where he joined the commando wing of the SAAF, rising to the rank of commandant. He died in Knysna in 1998.
