= Brian van Mentz =

South African WWII flying ace (1917–1941)

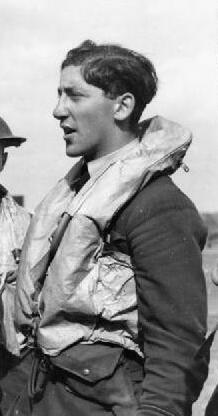
- Born: 23 December 1917; Johannesburg, South Africa
- Died: 26 April 1941 (aged 23)
- Burial place: Brookwood Military Cemetery
- Military career
- Branch: Royal Air Force
- Rank: Flight Lieutenant
- Service number: 70826
- Units: No. 213 Squadron; No. 504 (County of Nottingham) Squadron; No. 222 (Natal) Squadron
- Conflicts: Second World War: Battle of France; Battle of Britain
- Awards: Distinguished Flying Cross

Brian van Mentz, DFC (23 December 1917 – 26 April 1941) was a South-African born flying ace of the Royal Air Force (RAF) during the Second World War. He is credited with destroying at least seven German aircraft.

Born in Johannesburg, van Mentz joined the Royal Air Force Volunteer Reserve in 1937. After gaining his wings the following year, he gained a commission in the RAF. His initial posting was to No. 213 Squadron but shortly after the outbreak of the Second World War, he was transferred to No. 504 (County of Nottingham) Squadron. He flew with the squadron during the Battle of France in May 1940, achieving the first of his aerial victories in the intensive fighting on the continent. Soon after the squadron's return to the United Kingdom, van Mentz was posted to No. 222 (Natal) Squadron, which became heavily engaged in the Battle of Britain. He achieved several more aerial victories and he was subsequently awarded the Distinguished Flying Cross. He was killed, aged 23, when the Luftwaffe bombed the pub in which he was drinking.

== Early life ==
Brian van Mentz was born in Johannesburg, South Africa, on 23 December 1917, the son of Sidney van Mentz and his wife Rosine. He was educated in the United Kingdom, attending City of London Freemen's School in Ashtead, Surrey. He joined the Royal Air Force Volunteer Reserve (RAFVR) in September 1937, initially training at No. 4 Elementary & Reserve Flying Training School at Brough before proceeding to Uxbridge. Here he was granted his commission in the RAFVR, as an acting pilot officer. He went on to No. 8 Flying Training School at Montrose, where he gained his wings.

In July 1938, van Mentz was posted to No. 213 Squadron, at the time based at the Royal Air Force (RAF) station at Wittering and training on the Gloster Gauntlet fighter. Within six months it was to convert to the Hawker Hurricane fighter. In the interim, van Mentz had been granted a short service commission in the RAF as a pilot officer, relinquishing his commission in the RAFVR in October.

== Second World War ==
By the time of the outbreak of the Second World War, No. 213 Squadron had become operational. It saw little action in the early months of the war, being engaged in patrols along the east coast of the United Kingdom. By this stage Van Mentz had been transferred to No. 504 (County of Nottingham) Squadron, a Hurricane squadron stationed at Digby. In February 1940, van Mentz was taken off operations and hospitalised with meningitis for several weeks. He did not return to duty until 8 May.

=== Battle of France ===
Within a few days of van Mentz's arrival back at No. 504 Squadron, it was deployed to France to join the RAF fighter squadrons already based there and engaged in the aerial fighting that followed the German invasion of the Low Countries. The squadron was immediately engaged in the fighting and van Mentz's first confirmed victory was on 14 May, when he destroyed a Junkers Ju 88 medium bomber while carrying out a dawn patrol near the Albert Canal. The next day, he shot down a Junkers Ju 87 dive bomber as well as a Henschel Hs 126 reconnaissance aircraft, although the latter was unconfirmed. On 16 May, while carrying out a patrol, he engaged and damaged a Messerschmitt Bf 109 fighter. A few days later he was promoted to flying officer.

By 20 May, No. 504 Squadron only had four serviceable aircraft and van Mentz flew one of these back to the United Kingdom. He was then transferred to No. 222 (Natal) Squadron. This was equipped with Supermarine Spitfire fighters and based at Hornchurch. At the time, the funds for its aircraft being donated by the citizens of the South African Natal province. Van Mentz would be the only South African-born pilot to fly with the unit during the Battle of Britain.

=== Battle of Britain ===
Being based at Hornchurch, No. 222 Squadron was heavily engaged in the fighting over the southeast of England. On 31 August, van Mentz damaged a Bf 109 near Maidstone. This was followed by the destruction of a Messerschmitt Bf 110 heavy fighter on 3 September, near Rochford. Later that day he damaged a second Bf 110. On 7 September he was credited with probably destroying a Bf 109 and a Dornier Do 17 medium bomber, the latter shared with another pilot, although his Spitfire was damaged in the engagement. He shot down a Ju 88 on 11 September, seeing it crash into the sea off Hastings. When flying back to Hornchurch after this sortie he engaged a Bf 109, damaging it.

On 15 September, subsequently known as Battle of Britain Day, van Mentz damaged a Ju 88. He shot down a Bf 110 over Dover eight days later, seeing it go down in flames. On 12 October he damaged a Bf 110, and afterwards he was informed that he was to be awarded the Distinguished Flying Cross (DFC). Towards the end of October, the pace of operations had slowed and his DFC was publicly announced in the London Gazette. The published citation credited him with six victories:

F/O Van Mentz has been engaged in operations against the enemy since the outbreak of war. He has destroyed six enemy aircraft and probably a further three, two of which were shot down during the period of intensive operations in France. This officer has led his section, and at times his flight, with skill and courage and has shown great determination in pressing home his attacks against large enemy formations.

— London Gazette, No. 34978, 25 October 1940

On 30 October van Mentz damaged a Bf 109. By this time the Battle of Britain was effectively over and shortly afterwards, No. 222 Squadron moved to Coltishall for a period of less intensive operations, mainly patrolling over the North Sea. At the end of November, he destroyed a Do 17. Promoted to acting flight lieutenant in December, he was presented with his DFC by King George VI at a ceremony at Bircham Newton on 28 January 1941. Three days later, he recorded the probable destruction of a Ju 88. This was followed by a Heinkel He 111 medium bomber that was damaged on 2 February and one shared victory over a Do 17 on 18 March.

On Saturday 26 April, some personnel of No. 222 Squadron, including van Mentz, went to the Ferry Inn, a popular pub near Horning. Three bombs fell nearby, one falling on the pub at 9:46pm. Van Mentz was one of 21 people killed in the blast. He was buried in Brookwood Military Cemetery in Woking. He is credited with having shot down seven German aircraft, plus one shared with another pilot. He also had one unconfirmed aerial victory, three probably destroyed including one shared with another pilot, and nine damaged.
