= Robert Talbot (SAAF officer) =

South African flying ace of World War II

Robert Henry Talbot
- Born: 27 June 1916; Boksburg
- Died: 3 June 1941 (aged 24)
- Burial place: Halfaya Sollum War Cemetery
- Military career
- Branch: South African Air Force
- Rank: Lieutenant
- Nickname: Bob
- Service number: 102795V
- Conflicts: World War II

Robert Talbot (1916–1941) was a South African flying ace of World War II, credited with 10 'kills'.

Born in Boksburg, he joined the South African Air Force and received his pilot wings in October 1939. He flew Hawker Hartebees with 13 Squadron SAAF in 1940 before being posted to 274 Squadron from September 1940 to January 1941, taking part in the first Libyan Campaign. He was briefly posted home but then joined 1 Squadron SAAF in April 1941, flying Hurricanes. On 3 June 1941 his aircraft was damaged by Italian anti-aircraft artilleries, during a strafing run over Gambut airfield and his plane crashed into the sea on the way back to base and he was killed.
