= Khartoum Memorial =

War memorial in Khartoum, Sudan

Coordinates: 15.59722°N 32.53703°E

The Khartoum Memorial is a war memorial in Khartoum War Cemetery on the south-eastern side of Khartoum, Sudan.

The memorial lists the names of 590 Commonwealth military personnel who died during the 1940–1941 East African campaign of World War II (in the Sudan, or in the advance into Eritrea and Northern Ethiopia) and for whom there is no known grave.
