= 50 Squadron SAAF =

50 Squadron
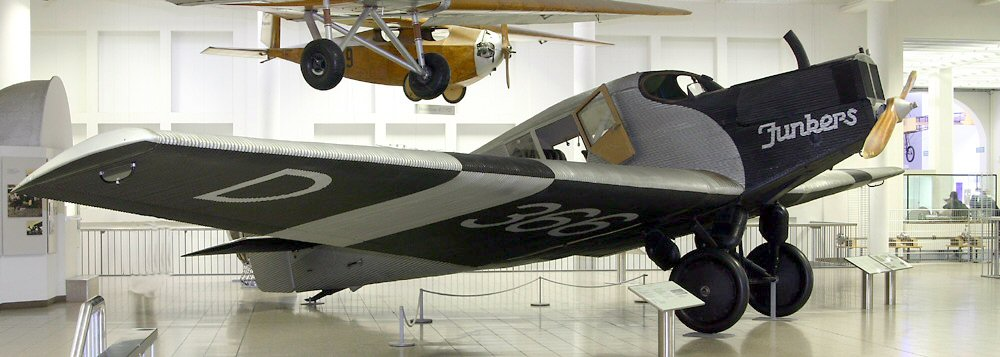
- Junkers F13, similar to those operated by 50 Squadron
- Active: 1939-c. 1946
- Country: South Africa
- Branch: South African Air Force

50 Squadron SAAF was a South African Air Force squadron during World War II.

== History ==
50 Squadron was formed on 1 December 1939 by amalgamating the SAAF's 17, 18 and 19 Squadrons. During the East African Campaign 50 Squadron operated a 'shuttle service' between the warzone in East Africa and South Africa as part of 1 Bomber Transport Brigade. The brigade was re-designated 5 Wing in February 1941, and continued to fly 'shuttle service' flights between the Mediterranean and South Africa until after the war.

The squadron operated Junkers F.13FE, Ju-86Z/K-1 and Ju 52/3M aircraft which had been requisitioned from the South African Airways at the outbreak of war. The eleven Ju 52's were assigned to 51 Flight, operating a shuttle service from Nairobi to Egypt, Middle East and South Africa.

== Aircraft ==
Aircraft flown by 50 Squadron
Note: Aircraft type photographs may not necessarily represent aircraft of the same mark or actual aircraft belonging to the squadron.
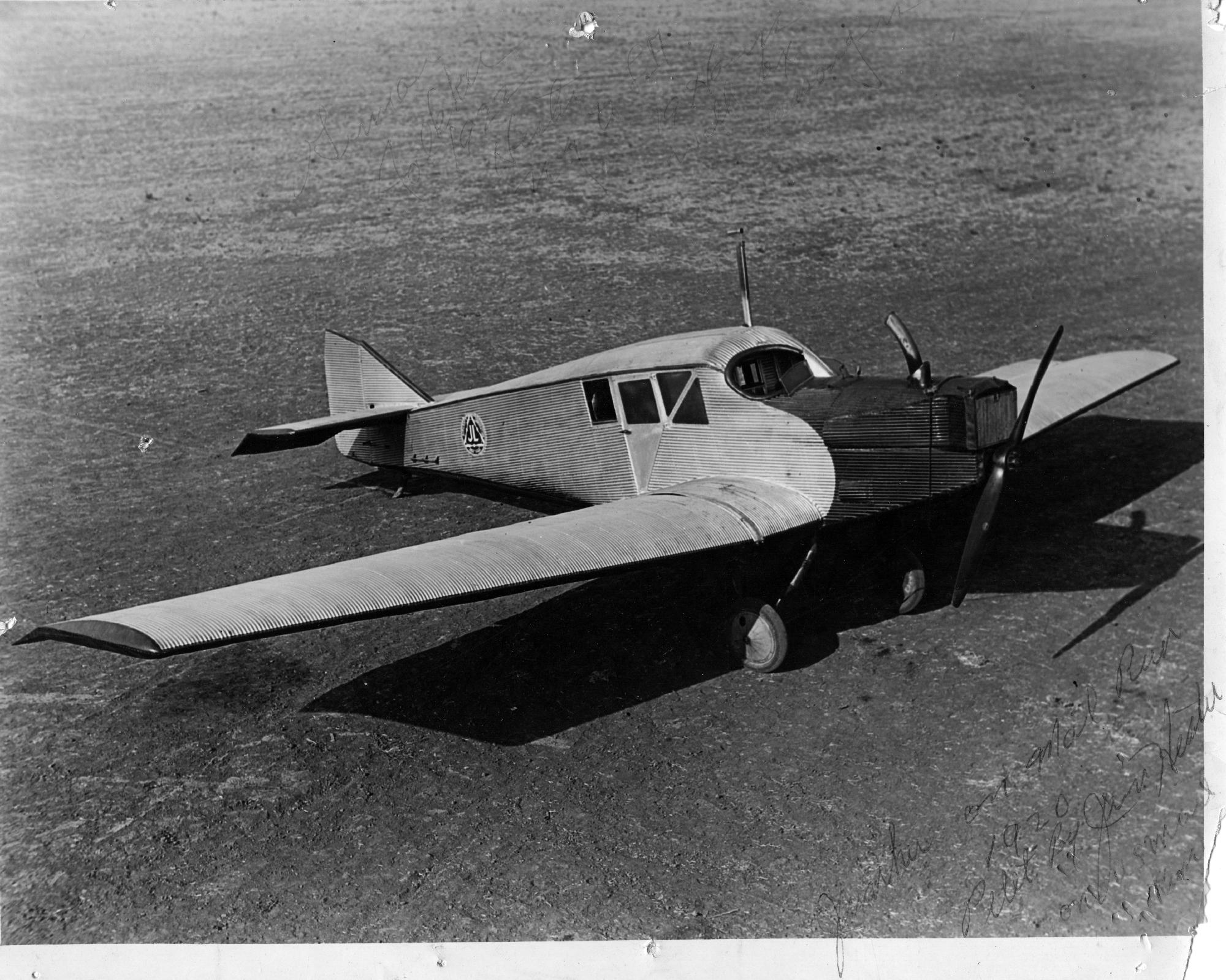
Junkers F.13FE
1939-c. 1946

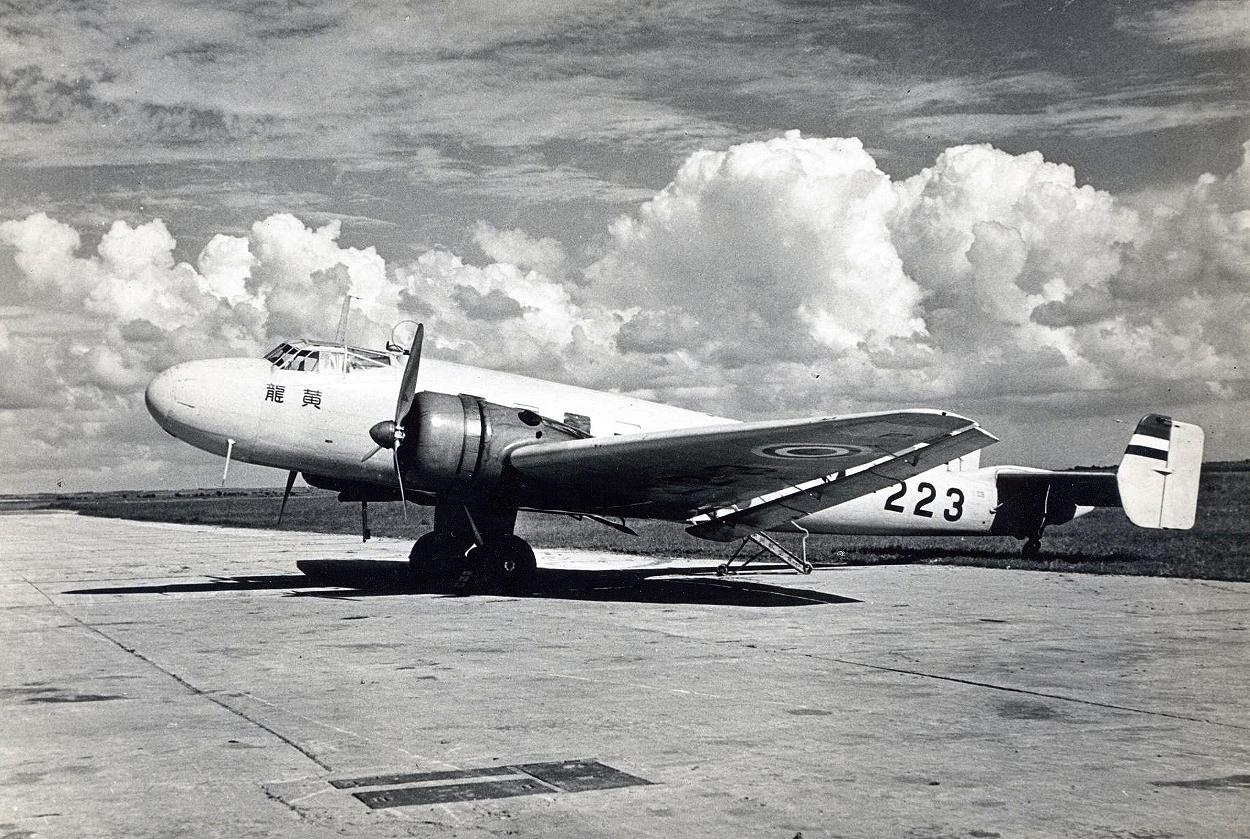
Ju-86Z/K-1
1939-c. 1946

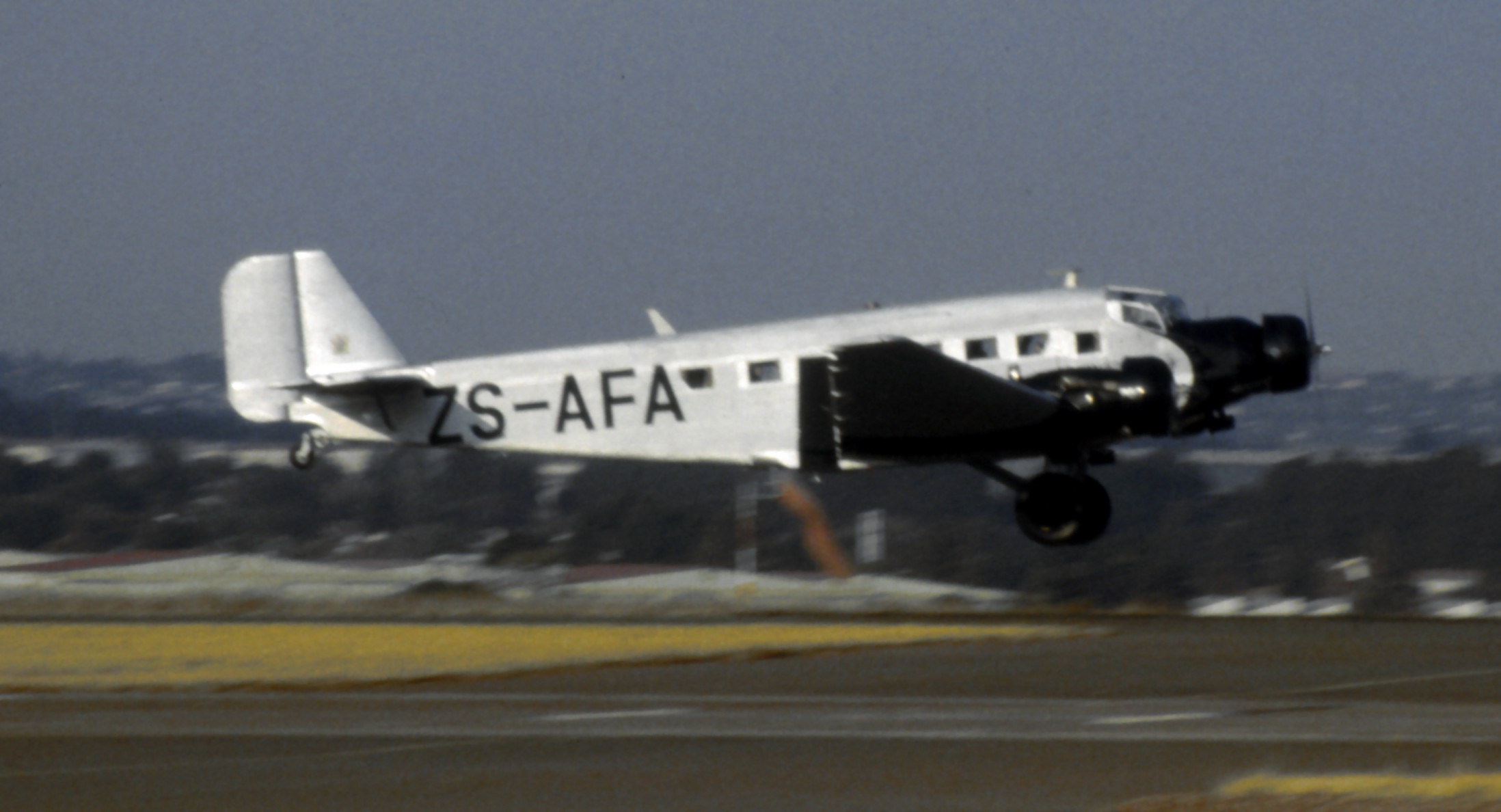
Ju 52/3M
1939-c. 1946
