= Geoffrey Haysom =

Geoffrey David Leybourne Haysom
- Born: 20 October 1917; Durban
- Died: 17 June 1979 (aged 61)
- Military career
- Branch: Royal Air Force
- Rank: Wing Commander
- Service number: 39736
- Commands: 239 Wing; 79 Squadron
- Awards: Distinguished Service Order; Distinguished Flying Cross

David Haysom (1917–1979) was a South African flying ace of World War II, credited with 6 'kills'.

== Life ==
Haysome was born in Durban in 1917 and attended Durban High School before going onto Natal University College, graduating with a BSc. He intended to study medicine at the University of Edinburgh but abandoned his studies to join the RAF on a short service commission in 1937.

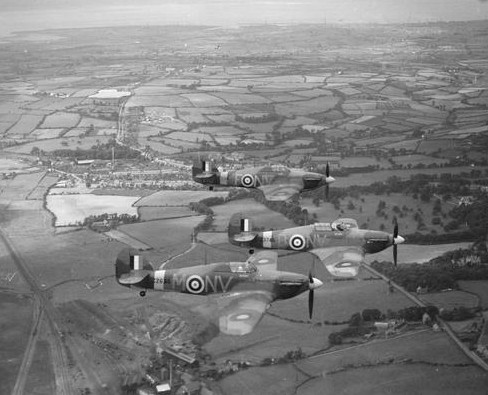
Haysom in flight

He joined 79 Squadron in 1938, flying Hurricanes.

He commanded the squadron from June to September 1941 before being posted to the Middle East, joining 260 Squadron in July 1942. He was appointed Acting Wing Commander and posted as Wing Leader of 239 Wing three days after joining 260 Squadron.

He was released from the RAF as a Group Captain in 1946. He died in 1979.
