= Adriaan Botha (SAAF officer) =

South African military aviator

Adriaan Jacobus Botha
- Born: 25 June 1921; Senekal, Orange Free State
- Died: 14 June 1941 (aged 19)
- Military career
- Branch: South African Air Force
- Rank: Lieutenant

Adriaan Jacobus Botha (25 June 1921 – 14 June 1941) was a South African flying ace of World War II, credited with five kills.

He died on 14 June 1941, after being shot down south of Bir Hakeim in Libya by a Messerschmitt Bf 109 from Jagdgeschwader 27.
