= 5 Squadron SAAF =

5 Squadron
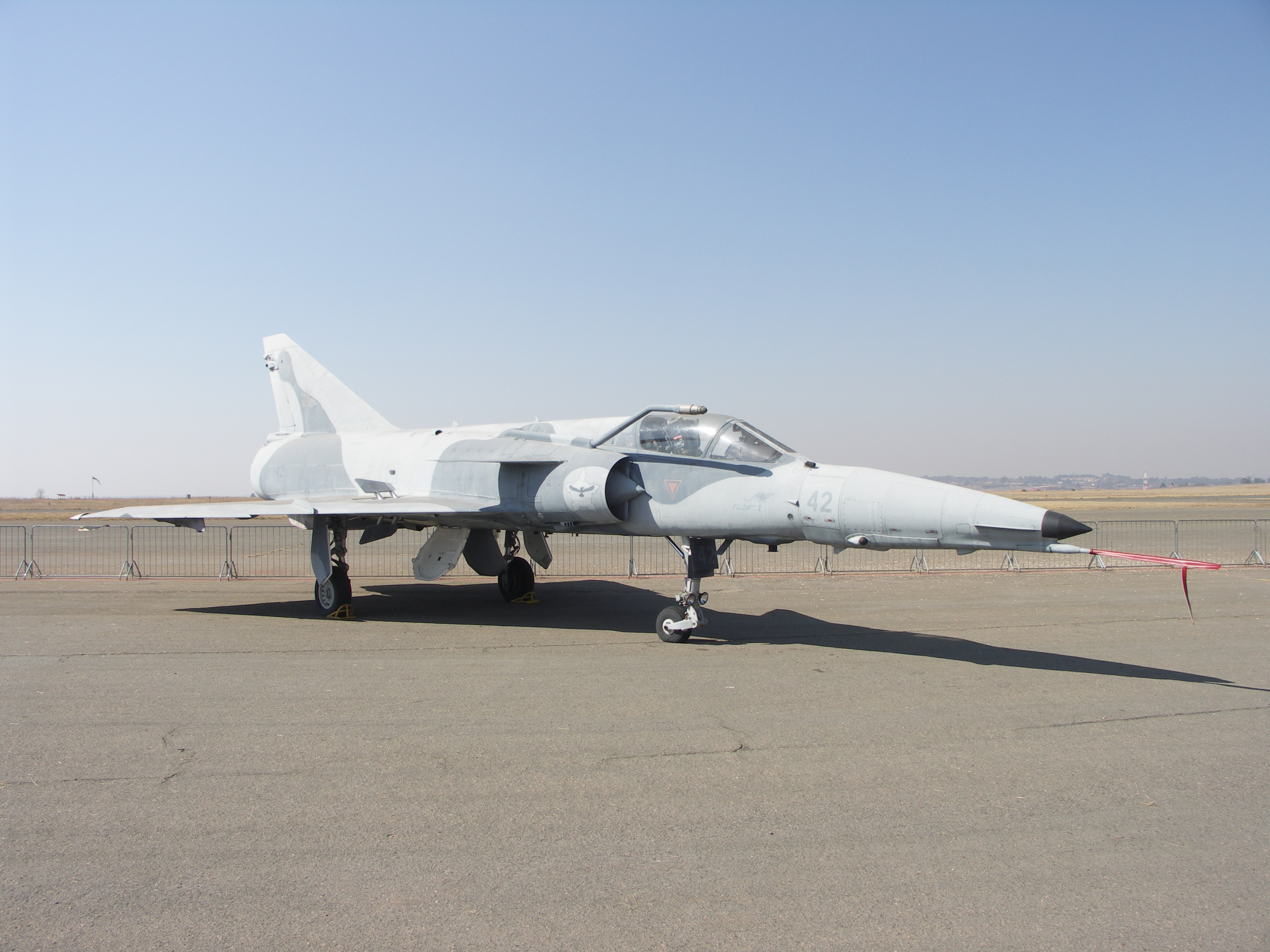
- Cheetah E Fighter
- Active: 1939, 1941–1944, 1950–1992
- Country: South Africa
- Branch: South African Air Force
- Role: World War II: Fighter and Fighter Bomber; Post World War II: Fighter Squadron
- Garrison/HQ: AFB Louis Trichardt when disbanded
- Nicknames: The Shakas, named after the Zulu warrior King Shaka
- Motto: Difficultates Aspiciemus (We shall confront all difficulties)

Insignia
- Squadron Identification Code: GL (1939–1945)
- 5 Squadron Insignia

5 Squadron SAAF was a South African Air Force Fighter / Fighter-Bomber squadron during World War II. It was disbanded at the end of the war and was re-commissioned in 1950. It remained active until 2 October 1992, when it was disbanded; its Atlas Cheetah E aircraft were also decommissioned.

== History ==
The squadron was initially designated as a fighter-bomber unit and formed in Cape Town in April 1939. It was only active for eight months and was disbanded in December that year. It was re-formed on 7 May 1941 as a fighter squadron operating from Zwartkop Air Station equipped with Mohawk Vs. It deployed to Egypt in December 1941 re-equipped with Tomahawk IIBs.

The squadron was initially tasked with providing anti-shipping patrols and subsequently deployed as a fighter squadron over the Western Desert battlefield area. At the end of 1942 it received Kittyhawk IIIs and later Kittyhawk IVs and began to specialize in the ground-attack role, although still being retained as an ordinary fighter squadron as required. After the cessation of hostilities in Africa, the squadron moved to Malta to support the invasion of Sicily, after which it moved to that island and then on to mainland Italy. By the time the squadron was deployed to Italy, it was used only in the ground attack role.

While deployed to Italy, the squadron flew close air support and fighter-bomber missions, some over Yugoslavia. The squadron took part in the battles on the Sangro River, Monte Cassino and the Gustav and Gothic Lines. The Kittyhawks were replaced by Mustang IIIs (and later Mustang IVs) and these aircraft were retained until the end of the war in Italy when the squadron was disbanded.

5 Squadron was re-formed in Durban in December 1950 as an 'Active Citizen Force' unit flying Harvards. It was re-equipped with Impala Mk Is in July 1973 and Impala Mk IIs in early 1981. The squadron then moved to AFB Louis Trichardt to be equipped with Cheetah Es. It was finally disbanded on 2 October 1992 when its Cheetah aircraft were decommissioned.

== Aircraft ==
Aircraft flown by 5 Squadron
Note: Aircraft type photographs may not necessarily represent aircraft of the same mark or actual aircraft belonging to the squadron.
Curtiss Mohawk
1941

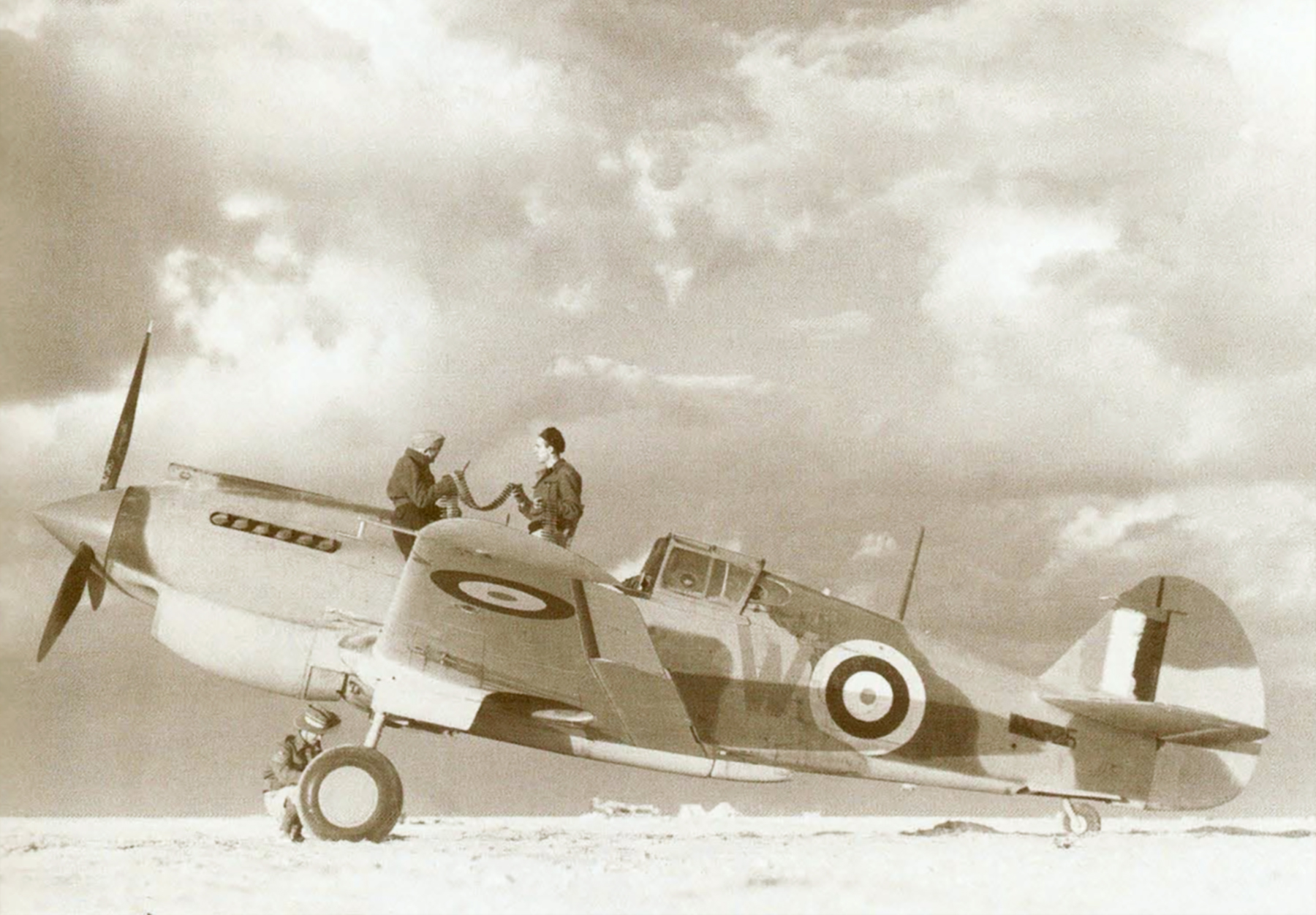
Curtiss Tomahawk
1941–1942

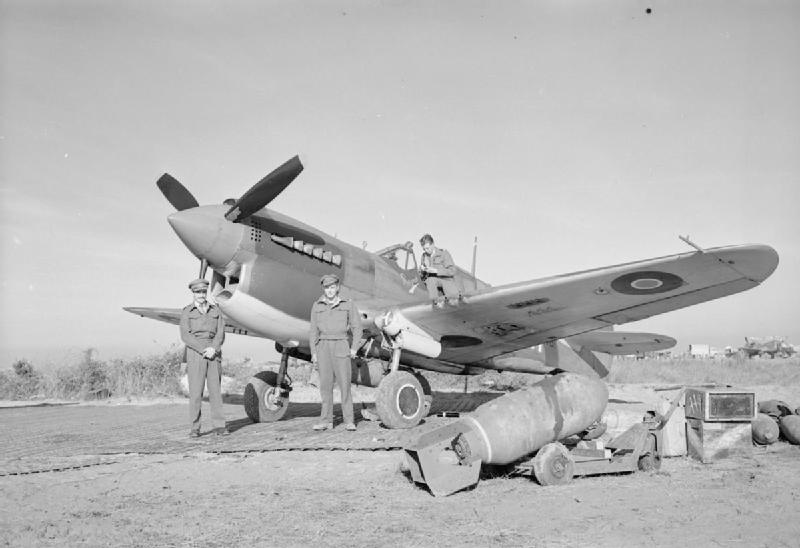
Curtiss Kittyhawk Mark III
Italy, 1942–1945

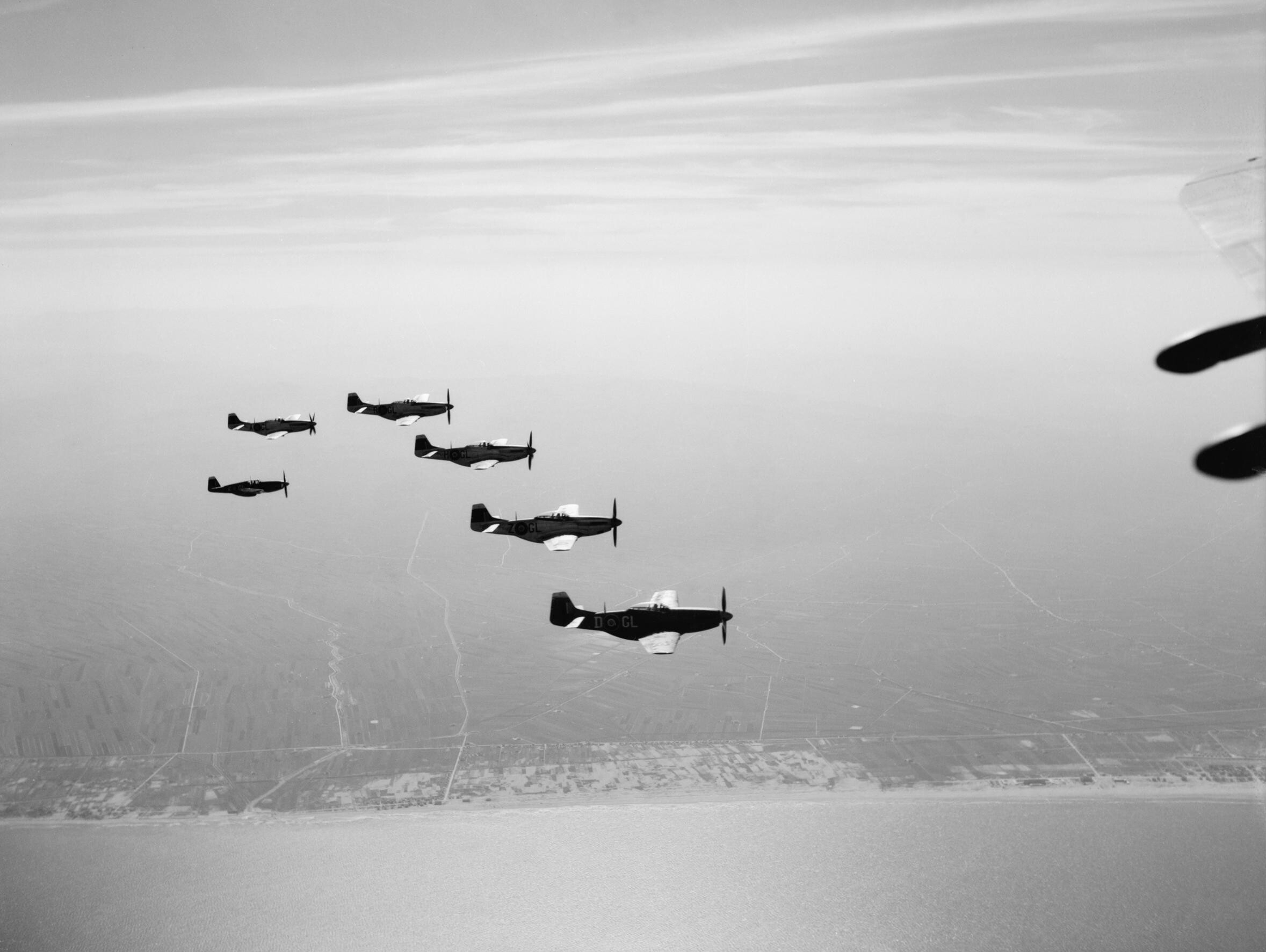
Mustangs of 5 Squadron SAAF
Italy, 1942–1945

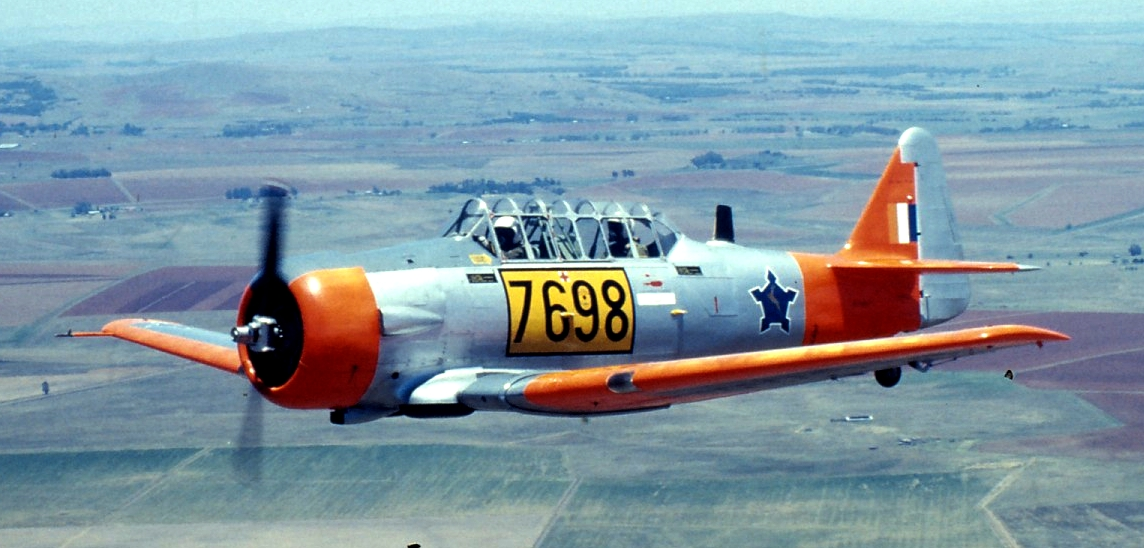
North American T-6 Harvard
1950–1973

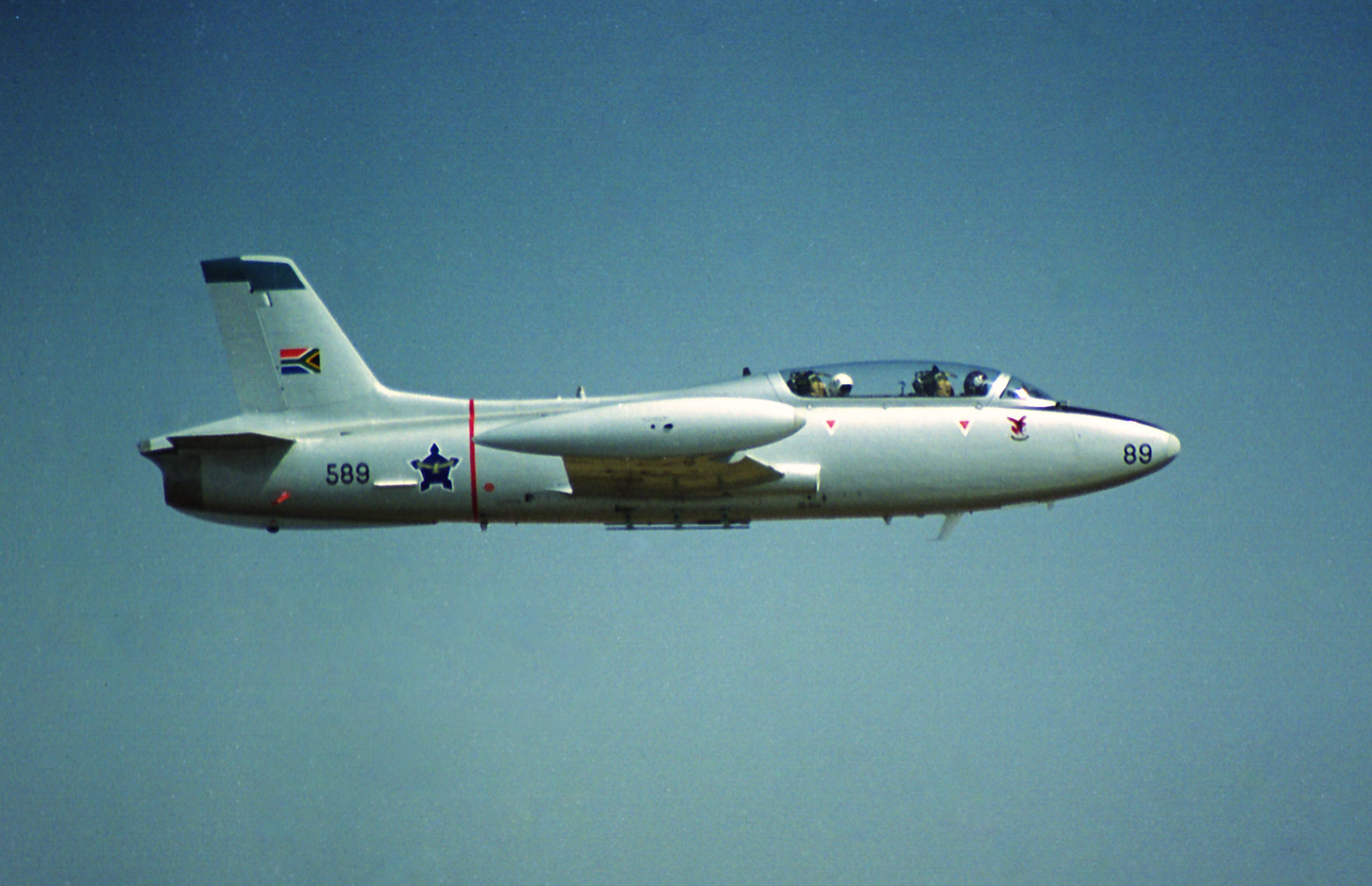
Atlas Impala Mk. I
1973–

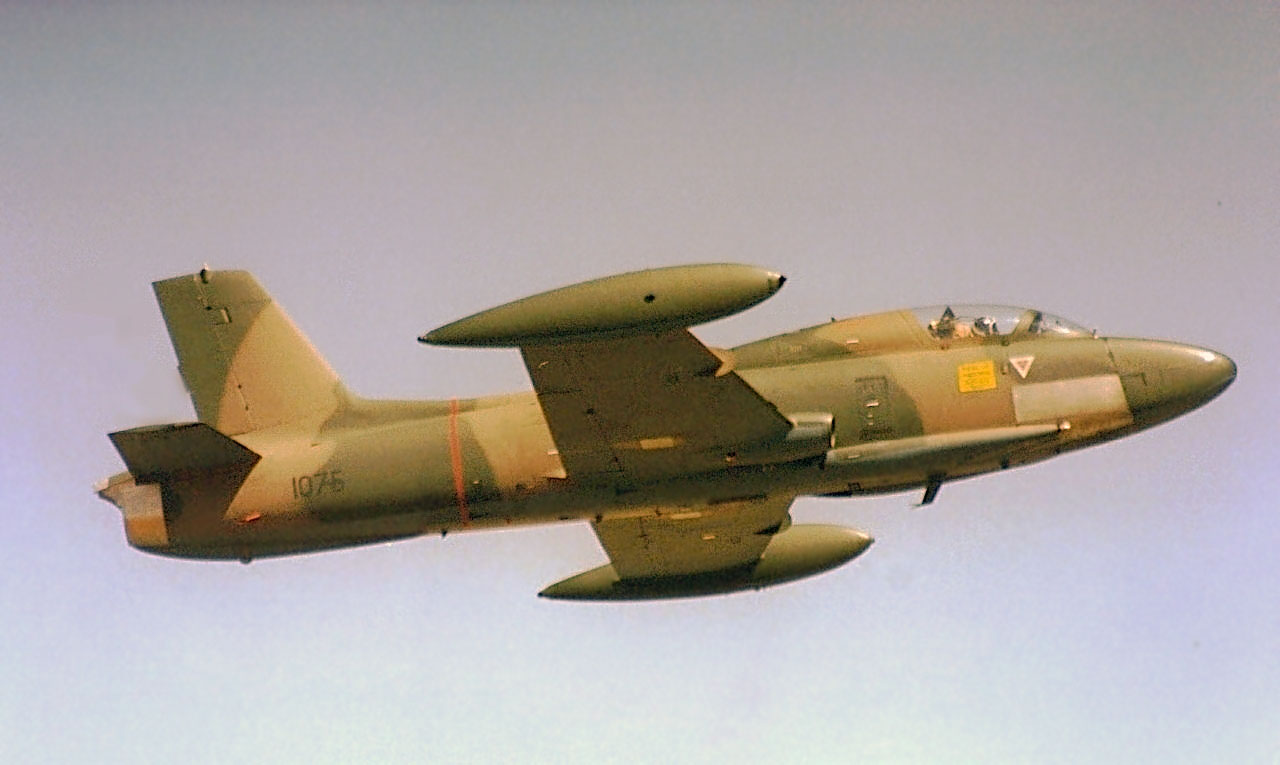
Atlas Impala Mk.II
1981–

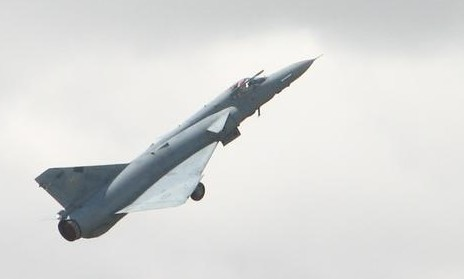
Atlas Cheetah E
−1992

== See also ==
- List of World War II aces from South Africa
