= 4 Squadron SAAF =

No. 4 Squadron
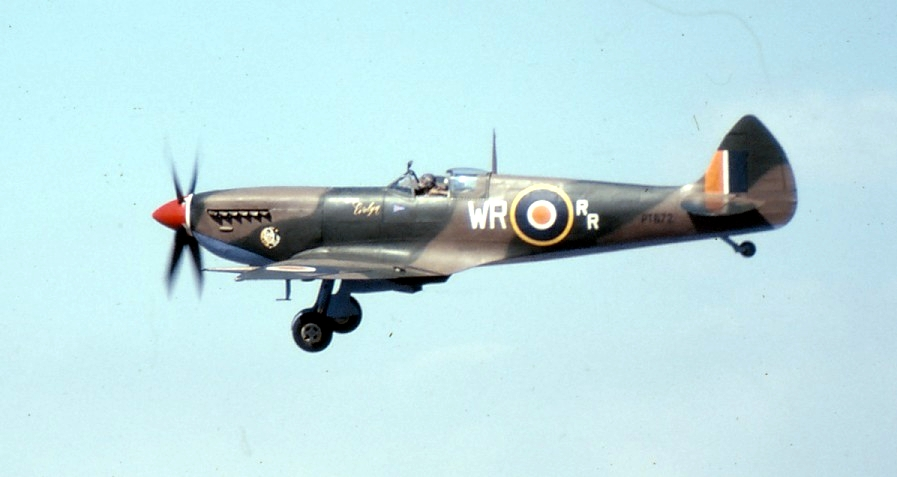
- Supermarine Spitfire Mk.IX
- Active: April 1939-December 1939; March 1941-October 1945; January 1951-October 1958; November 1961-September 1991
- Country: (South Africa)
- Branch: South African Air Force
- Role: Fighter Bomber · Counter Insurgency
- Motto(s): "Mors Hosti" (Death to the Enemy)

Insignia
- Squadron Identification Code: KJ 1942-1945 (1942–1943) (Squadron OC: Maj S.F. du Toit flew with personal identification code DUT in 1942-1943)
- 4 Squadron Insignia

No. 4 Squadron SAAF was a South African Air Force unit which served during World War II.

It was resurrected in 1951 and remained active until 1958. Its final period of active service was from 1961 to 1991. Its final aircraft were Impala Mk IIs. It was based at Lanseria Airport at the time of final disbandment.

== History ==
=== Establishment and deployment ===
The squadron was originally equipped with Hawker Hartbees, Hawker Furys and Wapitis when it was first formed in April 1939 in Durban. It was disbanded soon thereafter (December 1939) and resurrected at AFB Waterkloof on 24 March 1941 flying Hurricanes. Operational training took place in Kenya and soon the squadron was responsible for protection against possible Italian attacks from Somaliland. While in Kenya, it received a number of Curtiss Mohawks which had been taken over from French orders.

=== World War II ===
On 1 September 1941 the squadron began moving to Egypt and converted to Tomahawks. Its first combat patrol came on 12 November, early in Operation Crusader as a fighter-bomber squadron. The squadron remained in Egypt to take part in all of the desert battles from Operation Crusader to El Alamein. The squadron also supported the advance into Tunisia as well as the invasions of Sicily and Italy. The Kittyhawks were replaced by Spitfires in July 1943. In August it moved on to Sicily and to the Italian mainland in September from where it concentrated on ground attack missions until the end of hostilities. 4 Squadron remained in Italy for two months after the end of the war; on 12 July its personnel began returning to South Africa. The squadron was disbanded in October 1945.

=== Post World War II ===
4 Squadron was reformed in January 1951 at AFB Waterkloof as the Active Citizen Force element of 1 Squadron with Harvards and Spitfires until once again disbanded in October 1958. On 1 November 1961, it was reformed at Swartkop, flying Harvards and in August 1972 the first Impala Jets were received.

The squadron moved from Swartkop to Waterkloof and then to Lanseria Airport, where it received Impala Mk IIs. It saw numerous deployments to South-West Africa and Mpacha and Rundu airfields in southern Angola. Its home base remained at Lanseria until it was disbanded in September 1991.

== Aircraft ==
Aircraft flown by 4 Squadron
Note: Aircraft type photographs may not necessarily represent aircraft of the same mark or actual aircraft belonging to the squadron.
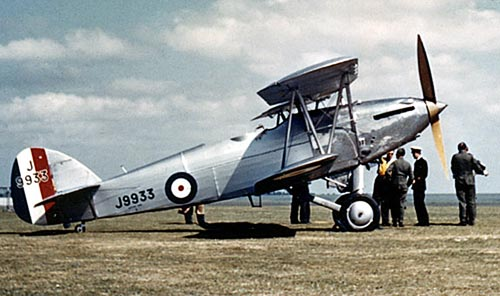
Hawker Hartbeest
1939

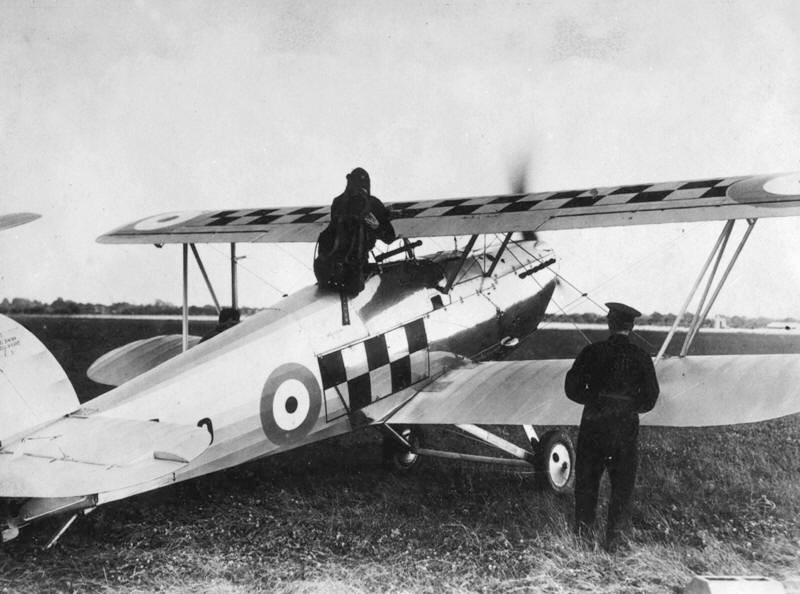
Hawker Fury
1939

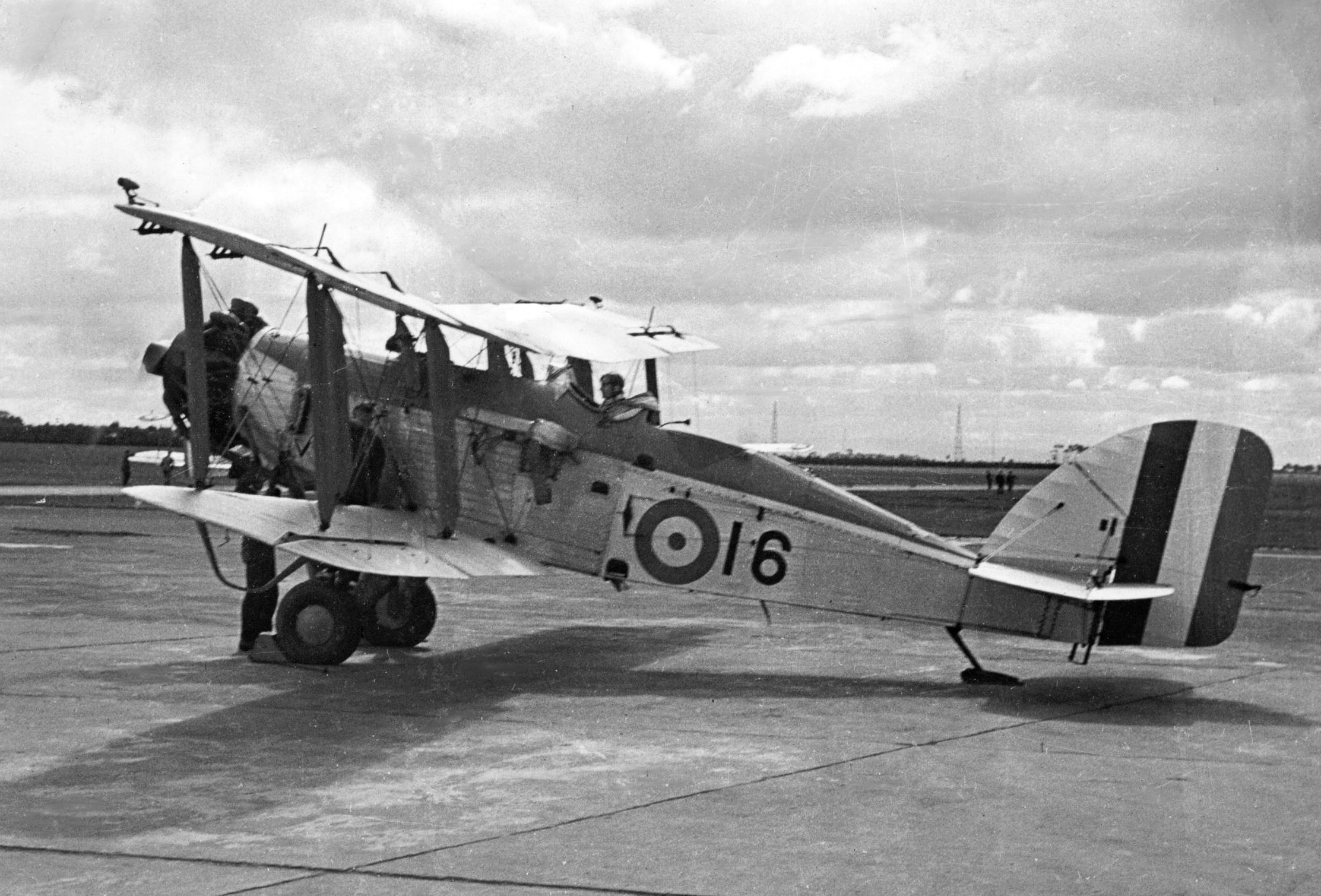
Westland Wapiti
1939

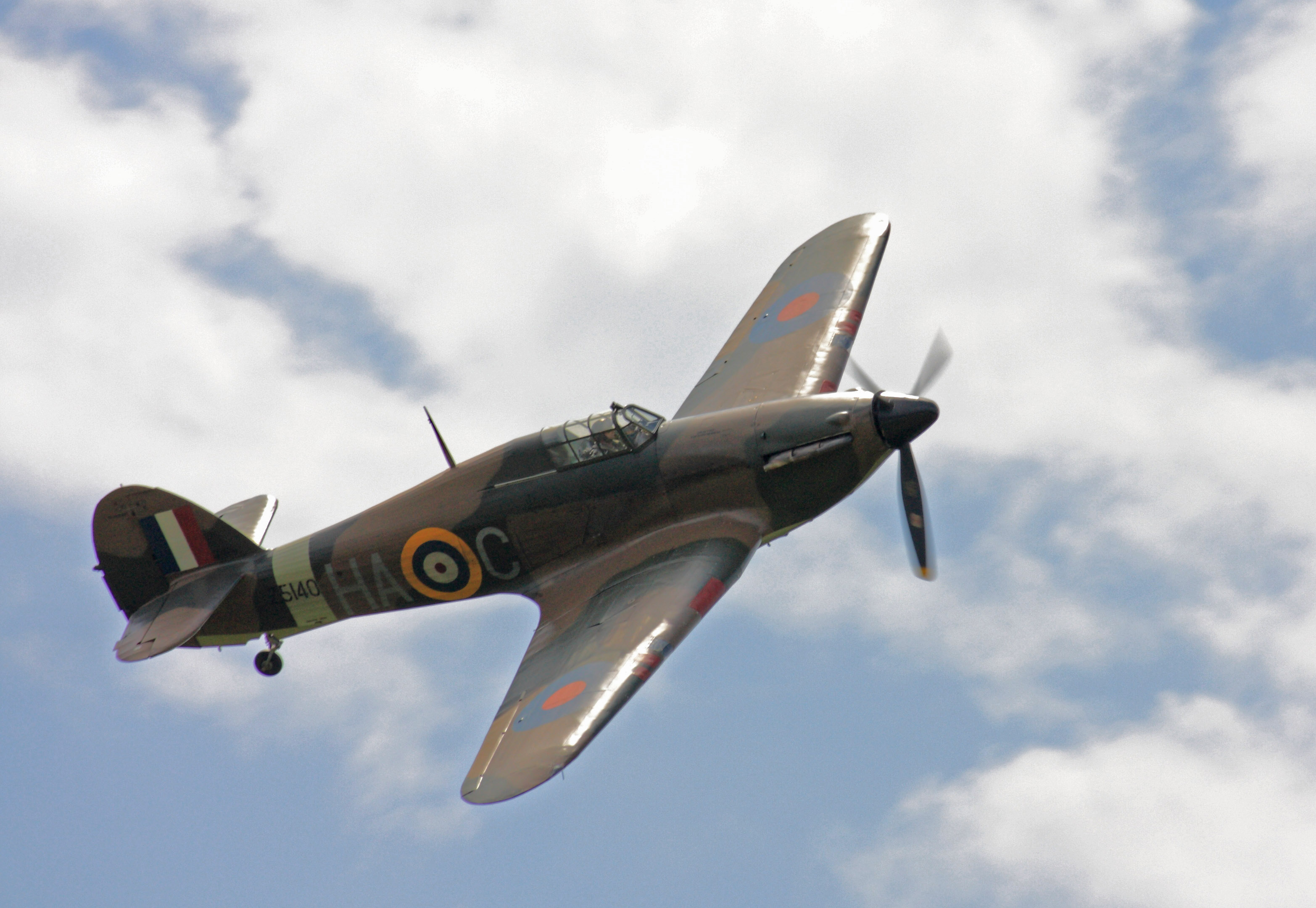
Hawker Hurricane
1941

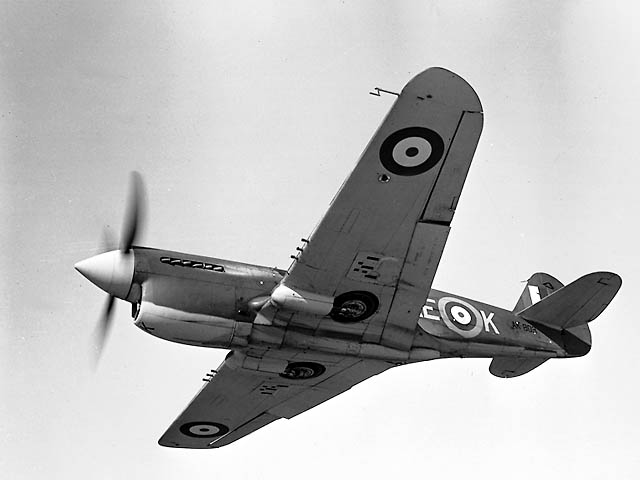
Curtiss 87A Kittyhawk
1941-1943

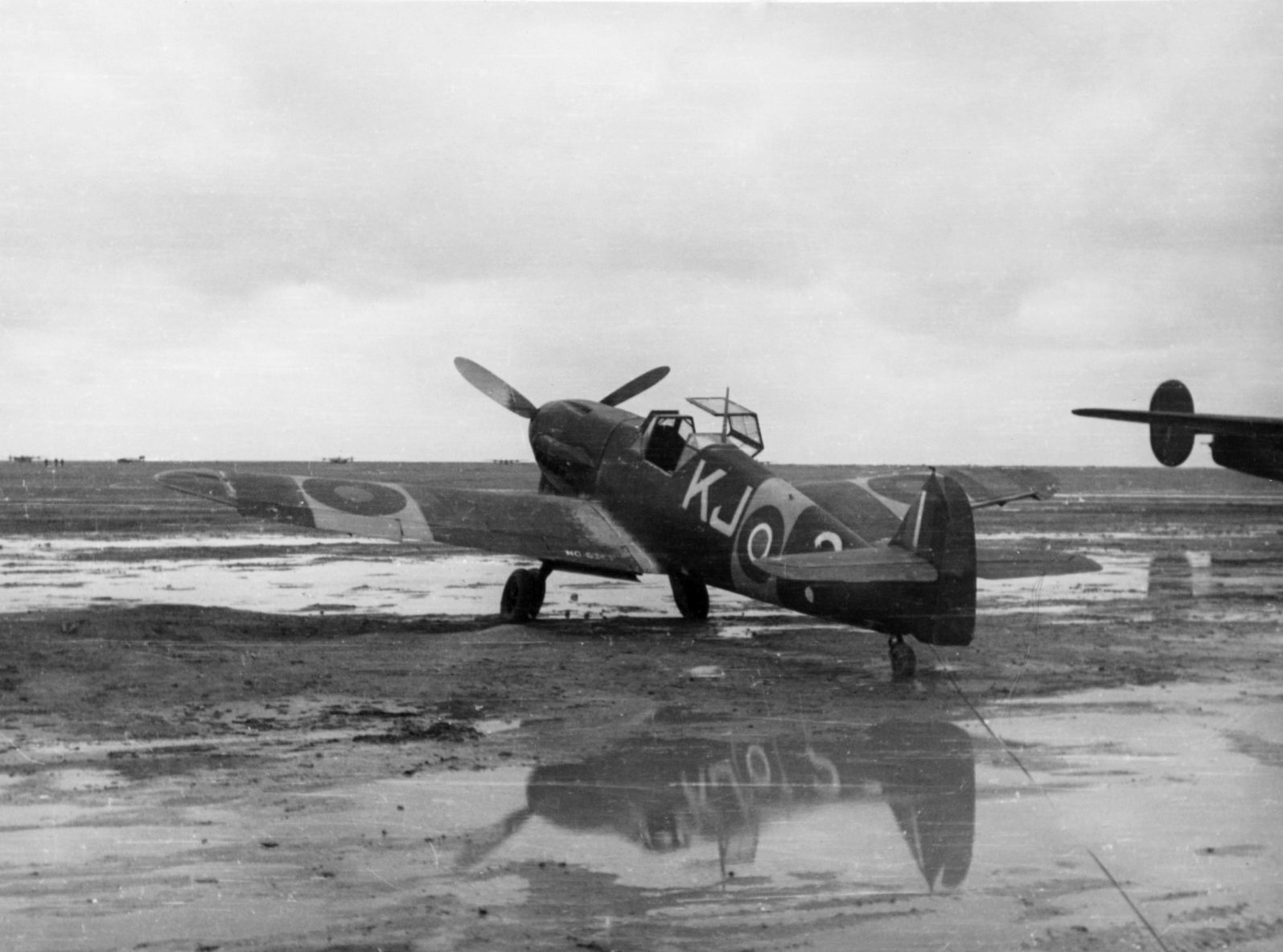
Captured Messerschmitt Bf 109F
North Africa, 1943

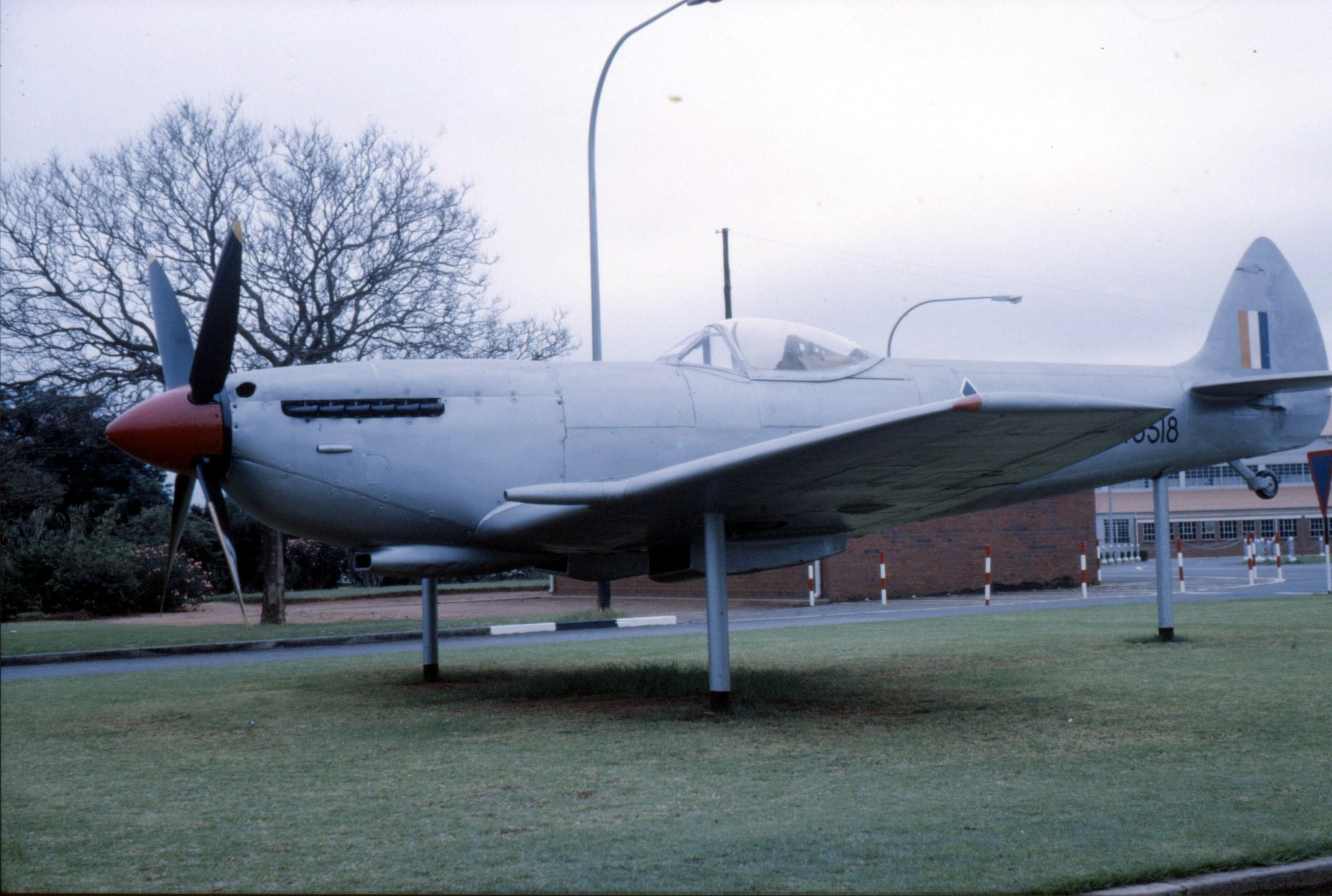
Supermarine Spitfire Mk.V
1943-1945, 1951-1958

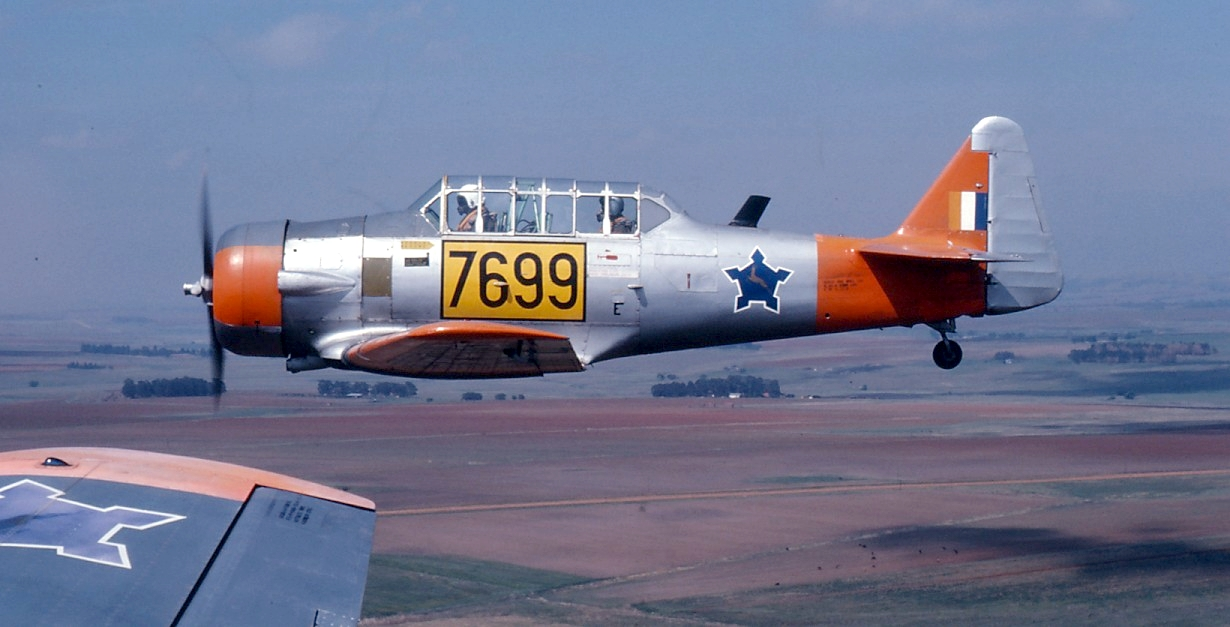
North American T-6 Harvard
1951-1958, 1961-1972

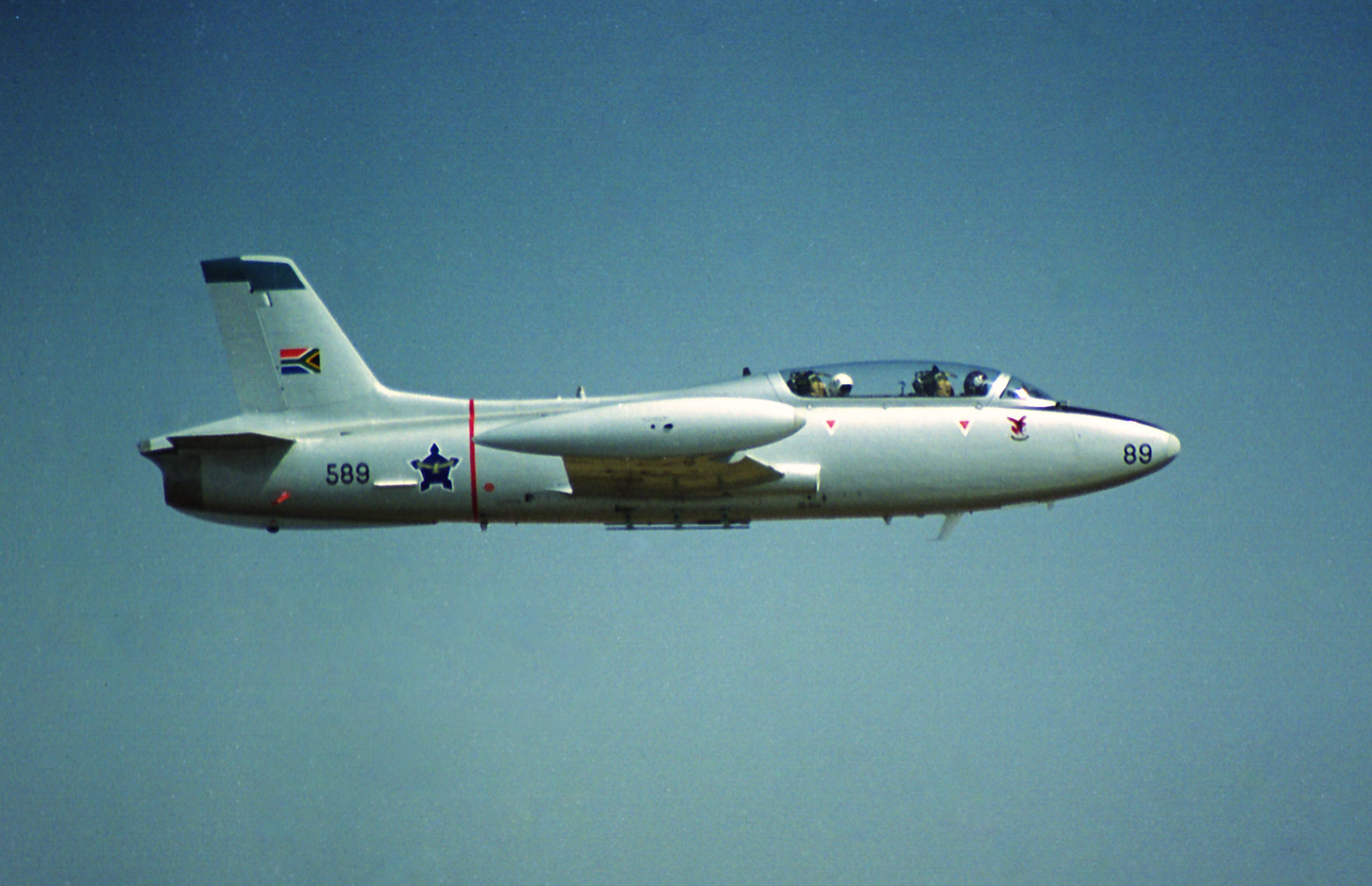
Atlas Impala Mk I
1972-1991

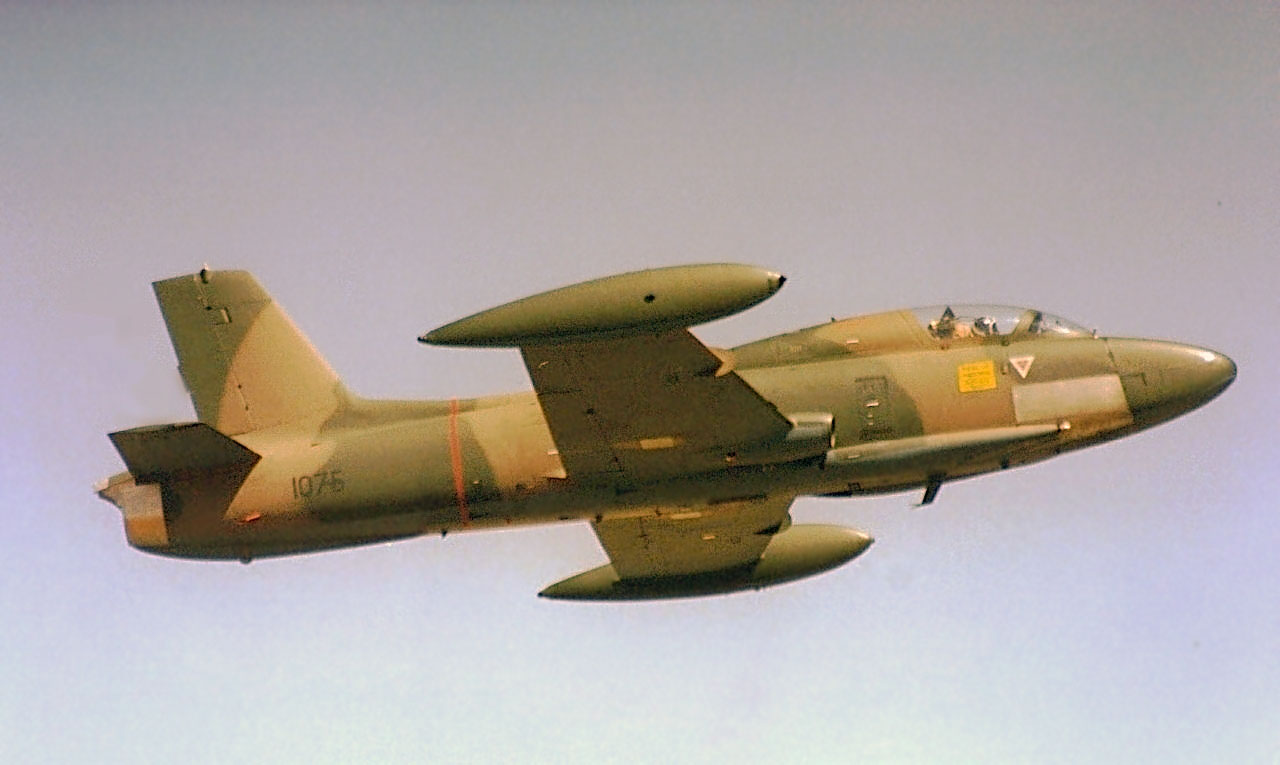
Atlas Impala Mk II
c. 1980-1991

== See also ==
- List of World War II aces from South Africa
