= 1 Squadron SAAF =

1 Squadron
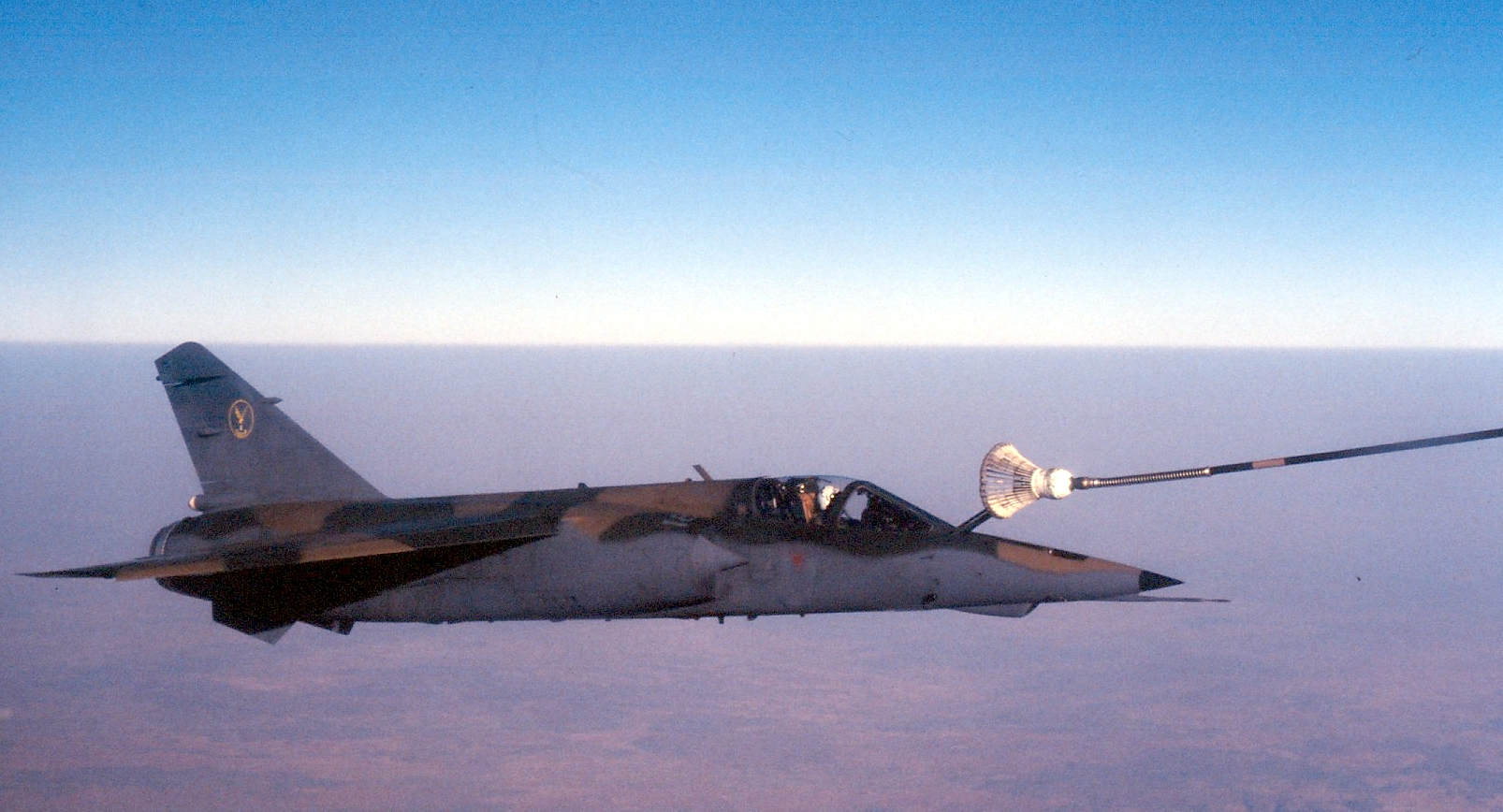
- Mirage F1AZ refuelling from a B707 tanker
- Active: February 1920 to 25 November 1997
- Country: South Africa
- Branch: South African Air Force
- Role: Fighter / Attack Squadron
- Garrison/HQ: AFB Hoedspruit when disbanded.
- Nickname(s): The Billy Boys
- Motto(s): Prima (First)

Insignia
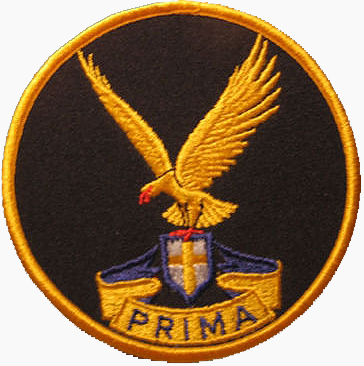
- Squadron Badge
- Squadron Identification Code: AX 1939-1945

1 Squadron SAAF was an air force squadron of the South African Air Force and was formed at Air Force Station Swartkop in February 1920, equipped with De Havilland DH.9s part of the Imperial Gift donation to South Africa by Britain. On 31 August 1939 the squadron was re-designated as 1 Bomber/Fighter Squadron and this was then changed to 11 (Bomber) Squadron in December 1939. The squadron was resurrected in February 1940 by the renumbering of 6 Squadron, equipped with four Hurricane Mk 1s and six Furies.

1 Squadron saw active service in East Africa in 1940, the Western Desert, Malta, and Sicily, and ended their war service in Italy in 1945. In 1950 the squadron's Spitfires were replaced with Vampires, and these in turn were replaced by Sabre Mk6s in 1956. In 1976 the squadron received Mirage F1AZ attack aircraft and it was disbanded when the F1AZs were retired on 25 November 1997.

== History ==
=== Establishment ===
There had been no official squadron designations in the South African Air Force (SAAF) from its inception in 1920 until the early 1938 when 1 and 2 Transvaal Air Squadrons were formed as training units based at Waterkloof Air Station which had been opened earlier that year. Each squadron comprised 18 aircraft, divided into 3 flights each, plus a headquarters or administrative flight per squadron. Each flight was structured to form the working nucleus of a squadron. A flight of SE5s was to be the cadre of a fighting/ground strafing squadron; Avro 504Ks of a training and artillery spotter squadron, and DH9s were to form the cadre of a long-distance communication, photographic, bombing, and reconnaissance squadron.

=== World War II ===
On 31 August 1939, 1 Transvaal Air Squadron was re-designated as 1 (Fighter-Bomber) Squadron, and the original aircraft were replaced with Hawker Hartebeest. It took until May 1940 for the squadron to be trained and brought up to strength, by when it had been equipped with four Hurricanes and six Furies and was officially titled "1 (Fighter) Squadron," commanded by Maj. N.G. Niblock-Stuart. The squadron was the first SAAF squadron to deploy in support of the Allied war effort, when a group of pilots and support staff were ferried to Egypt on 13 May 1940 by 50 Squadron. Once they had arrived in Egypt, they were equipped with 18 Gloster Gladiators.

At the same time, the Hurricanes were ferried north from Pretoria on 22 and 24 May, accompanied by a Ju86 (Note: These Ju86s had been purchased from Germany as passenger aircraft for South African Airways. At the outbreak of war, they were transferred to the SAAF and modified to permit them to be used as bombers by the addition of external bomb racks. (Brown (1990) p.54)) carrying the maintenance crews and arrived in Nairobi at the end of May. The squadron's Fury aircraft were flown from Pretoria to Durban for crating and were then shipped to Mombasa on SS Takliwa, embarking on 26 May and arriving in East Africa on 1 June 1940 where the Furies were un-crated and re-assembled. By early June the pilots from Egypt had married up with their aircraft in East Africa and were declared operational.

==== East Africa ====
The squadron's first operational mission was an attack on the Italian Regia Aeronautica air base at Yavello in Abyssinia, on 17 June 1940. The task of the two Hurricanes was to escort three Junkers Ju 86 bombers from 12 Sqn in the attack on the airfield. The attack destroyed airport infrastructure as well as six Caproni Ca 133s on the ground. But a couple of Fiat CR.32s from 412ª Squadriglia had scrambled as soon as the South Africans had been spotted. The two Italian pilots severely damaged one of the Ju 86s, then shot down one of the Hurricanes (Note: 2nd Lt B.L. Griffiths, who was to be the first operational casualty of the squadron.) Capt St E. Truter, in the second Hurricane, reacted: he attacked and chased away the CR.32 flown by Tenente Aldo Meoli, that flipped over when it landed.

The squadron's Hurricanes, Gladiators and Hartbeest aircraft continued to provide fighter cover but by late 1940 the Hartbeest were proving to be no longer a match for the Italian Fiat CR.42 Falcos and one flight consisting of Hartbeest and Gladiators was split off from the squadron to form the nucleus of 2 Fighter Bomber Squadron. The squadron then continued operating with the remaining Gladiators and Hurricanes from airfields in Abyssinia and Sudan until the fall of Addis Ababa on 5 April 1941. Although the East African campaign continued until November 1941, the absence of Italian fighters permitted the squadron to be moved to the Middle East on 8 April 1941.

From June 1940 to April 1941 the squadron operated from Kenya, Abyssinia, Sudan (Azzoza and Port Sudan), and Eritrea.

==== Western Desert ====
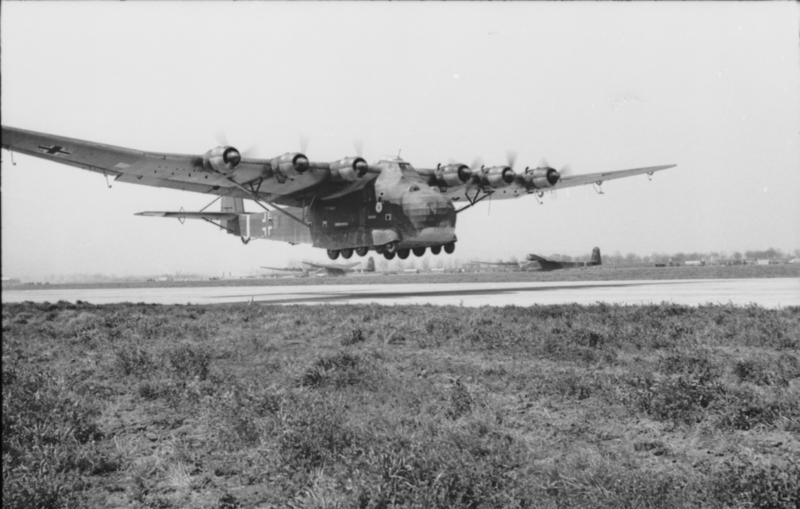
SAAF Squadrons intercepted and destroyed 16 of these Me323's on 22 April 1943

The squadron arrived in April 1941 and scored its first kill on 16 May when Lt. Talbot shot down a Ju 87. The first large-scale deployment was in support of Operation Brevity and later in support of Operation Battleaxe when Lt. Talbot – the squadron's highest scoring ace, with 10 kills at that stage – was shot down and killed. By this stage, the squadron was only flying Hurricanes. During Operation Crusader the squadron forced down a German Bf109F, capturing it intact – for which they were congratulated by Air Chief Marshal Tedder for capturing the first of this type of aircraft.

By the time of Operation Crusader the squadron was part of No. 258 Wing RAF, under the direct command of Air Headquarters Western Desert.

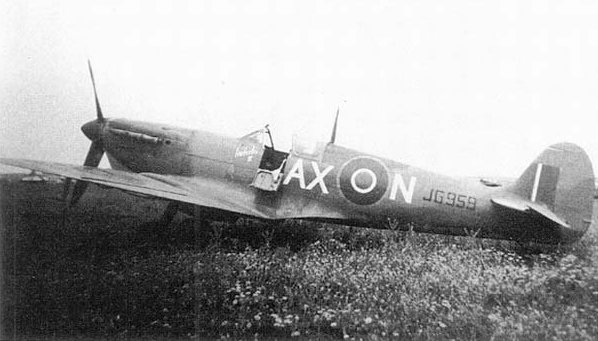
Spitfire Mk. Vc of 1 Squadron SAAF

On 3 July 1942, the squadron was intercepting a German raid on the Alamein area while No. 272 Squadron RAF was providing them with top cover. The formation came across 15 Junkers Ju 87s escorted by 7 Bf109s; 274 Sqn attacked the Bf109s whilst 1 Sqn went after the Ju 87s. In what was later to become known as the "1 Squadron Stuka Party" the squadron destroyed 14 Ju 87s, damaged two, and shot down one of the Bf109s for the loss of just one aircraft (Lt Ray Connell, who crash-landed at Burgh-el-Arab after a rear gunner destroyed his oil pump) in a forty-five-minute engagement.

During the second Battle of El Alamein, the squadron was tasked with protecting the allied armour in their advance across the start line during the break-out phase, where squadron Hurricanes destroyed a number of Ju 87 Stukas during this phase of the battle. After the Battle of Alamein, the squadron received Spitfires as replacements for their Hawker Hurricanes.

During April 1943, German transport aircraft were freighting supplies to the beleaguered Africa Korps in Tunisia after Allied air and sea interdiction had stopped most of their shipborne supplies coming from Italy. On the 22nd, the squadron Spitfires joined by Kittyhawks from SAAF 2, 4 and 5 Squadrons intercepted 21 huge Me323's attempting to bring in fuel (each aircraft carried 10 tons of fuel) to Tunisia. They destroyed 16 Me323s and two of their fighter escorts (one MC.202 and one Re.2001). After this successful intercept, Goering forbade all transport flights to Africa. The decision was overturned two days later after protests from Kesselring, on condition that all future flights were made by night.

During the fighting in the Western Desert in 1941 (while operating under the 6 Squadron designation) they acquired their nickname "The Billy Boys" because whenever successful in combat, the South African pilots would shout "Jou Bielie!" over the radio (roughly translated into British English as "You clever chap!" and into American English as "You Hoss!").

==== Italy ====
By July 1943, 1 Sqn had ceased operations in North Africa and were then tasked with patrolling the beaches where the landings for the invasion of Sicily were to take place. After the successful landings of Operation Husky and the subsequent exploitation, the squadron moved to Sicily on 14 July. After 38 days in Sicily, the squadron again provided cover for the British landings in Italy on 3 September 1943 to be followed by them providing fighter cover at the Anzio landings on 22 January 1944. The squadron then moved to Italy and supported the assault on Rome, claiming 16 enemy aircraft destroyed during this battle. 1 Squadron remained in Italy for the rest of the war operating as a fighter squadron but also flying ground attack sorties towards the end of the Italian campaign. In June 1945 the squadron began to convert to the North American Mustangs, but by July 1945, when the squadron's personnel started to return to South Africa, only a few Mustangs had been delivered.

=== Postwar to disbandment ===
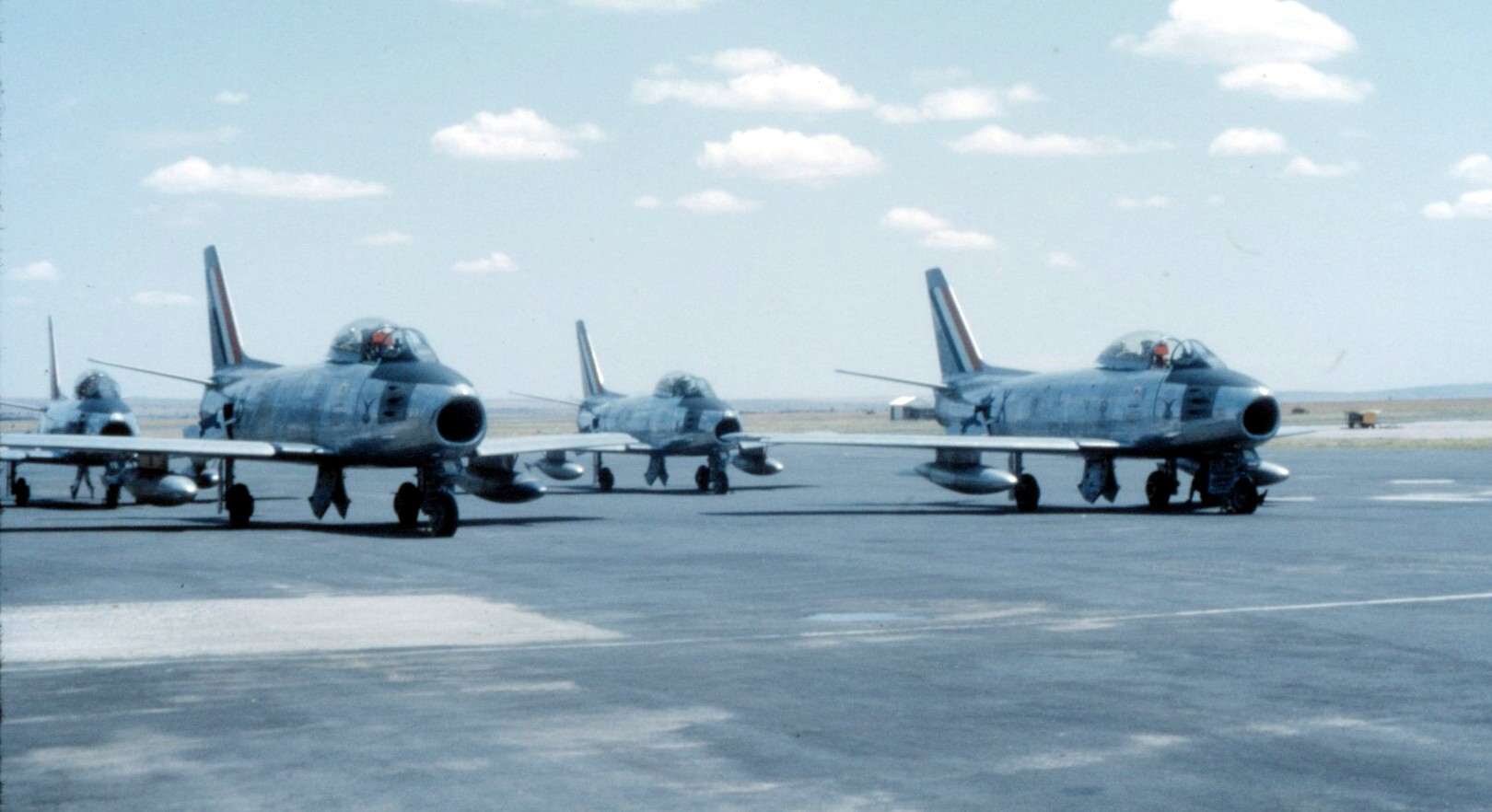
1 Squadron Sabres on the flightline at AFB Pietersburg in 1970

After the end of the war, the number of SAAF aircraft were greatly reduced, many being scrapped or sold at nominal prices. By June 1946, the squadron was assigned to 7 Wing SAAF based at AFB Waterkloof, flying Harvards but still retaining the Spitfires. In 1947 the concept of the Active Citizen Force was introduced whereby permanent force pilots would fly the squadron aircraft in the week and citizen force pilot officers would pilot the same Harvards and Spitfires over the weekends. Because of the Citizen Force association with the squadron, its name was changed to 1 "City of Pretoria" Squadron.

By 1954 all of the squadron's Spitfires were retired and replaced by Sabre Mk6s in 1956. Additional new aircraft types were procured and by 1957 the squadron had 16 Sabres, 12 Vampires and 12 Harvards on strength.

The squadron was later reequipped with the Impala Mk. I and then the Mirage F1AZ, operating from Hoedspruit until its disbandment on 25 November 1997. It saw combat during the South African Border War in SWA/Angola.

== Bases and areas of operation ==
The squadron was deployed from the following bases / operated in the following arenas:

Period From	Period To	Base	Area of Operations
February 1920	1936	AFS Swartkop	South Africa
1936	May 1940	AFS Waterkloof	South Africa
June 1940	8 April 1941	Kenya, Abyssinia, Sudan (Azzoza and Port Sudan) and Eritrea (Tessebei)	East Africa
8 April 1941	May 1943	Various bases and forward airfields in Egypt, Libya, and Tunisia	Western Desert
June 1943	14 July 1943	Luga and Takali (Malta)	Malta
14 July 1943	September 1943	Pachino (Sicliy)	Sicily
September 1943	August 1945	Various bases and forward airfields in Italy (Isola, Cassano, Scanzano, Gioia del Colle, Palata, Trigno, Sinello, Marcigliano, Orvieto, Foiana, Rimini, Bellaria, Forli, Ravenna, and finally Lavariano)	Italy
August 1945	June 1947	AFB Swartkop	South Africa
June 1947	1967	AFB Waterkloof	South Africa
1967	1975	AFB Pietersburg	South Africa, South West Africa (Namibia), Angola
1975	14 January 1981	AFB Waterkloof	South Africa, South West Africa (Namibia), Angola
14 January 1981	25 November 1997	AFB Hoedspruit	South Africa, South West Africa (Namibia), Angola

== Aircraft ==
Period From	Period To	Aircraft Type	Arena
1920	1939	Royal Aircraft Factory S.E.5 (Note: These aircraft were flown whilst designated as 1 Transvaal Air Squadron.)	South Africa
1939	1940	Hawker Hartbeest	East and South Africa
September 1936	30 September 1940	Hawker Fury	East and South Africa
August 1940		Gloster Gladiator	East Africa
1940	4 November 1942	Hawker Hurricane Mk I, IIB, (Note: Hurricane Mk IIs were received in October 1941.) IIC	South Africa, East and North Africa
4 November 1942	1946	Supermarine Spitfire Mk. VC	North Africa, Sicily, Italy and South Africa
1946		Harvard	South Africa
1947	1954	Supermarine Spitfire Mk IX	South Africa
1950	September 1956	De Havilland Vampire FB-52	South Africa
September 1956	1967	Canadair CL-13B Sabre Mk.6	South Africa
1967	April 1975	Impala Mk I	South Africa, South West Africa, Angola
April 1975	25 November 1997	Mirage F1AZ	South Africa, South West Africa, Angola

== See also ==
- List of World War II aces from South Africa
