= Charles Darwin (disambiguation) =

Charles Darwin (1809–1882) was an English naturalist, known for his contributions to the science of evolution.

Charles Darwin may also refer to:

== People ==
- Charles Darwin (medical student) (1758–1778), uncle of the naturalist
- Charles Waring Darwin (infant) (1856–1858), son of the naturalist
- Charles Galton Darwin (1887–1962), English physicist, grandson of the naturalist
- Charles Darwin (RAF officer) (1894–1941), First World War flying ace
- Charles Waring Darwin (British Army officer) (1855–1928), British soldier and landowner

== Places ==
- Charles Darwin, Northern Territory, a suburb in Australia
- Charles Darwin National Park, a protected area in Australia
- Charles Darwin Reserve, reserve in Australia
- Charles Darwin School, secondary school in Biggin Hill, London, England
- Charles Darwin University, a university in Australia

== Other uses ==
- Charles Darwin (Collier), the title of two oil portraits by John Collier
- RRS Charles Darwin, a Royal Research Ship belonging to the British Natural Environment Research Council
- Charles Darwin: The Scholar Who Changed Human History, a 2000 illustrated book by Patrick Tort

== See also ==
- Darwin Charles, fictional character in Invasion
- Darwin (disambiguation)
