= Charles Waring Darwin =

Charles Waring Darwin may refer to:

- Charles Waring Darwin (British Army officer) (1855–1928), British soldier and landowner
- Charles Waring Darwin (infant) (1856–1858), son of the naturalist Charles Darwin

== See also ==
- Charles Darwin (disambiguation)
- Darwin (disambiguation)
