= Michael Birkin =

Air Cdre James Michael Birkin CB DSO OBE DFC AFC DL RAF (23 April 1912 – 17 November 1985) was a Royal Air Force officer.

He served during the Second World War where he was awarded the AFC (1942), DFC (1944) and DSO (1944). After the war he was aide-de-camp to Queen Elizabeth II from 1957 to 1963, and High Sheriff of the Isle of Wight.
