= Arthur Vigers =

Arthur Whitehair Vigers
- Born: 20 January 1890; Isleworth, Middlesex, United Kingdom
- Died: September 1968 (aged 77–78); Bunbury, Western Australia
- Military career
- Allegiance: United Kingdom
- Branch: British Army; Royal Air Force
- Service years: 1908–1919
- Rank: Captain
- Nickname: Wiggy
- Units: London Cable Signal Company; No. 15 Squadron RFC; No. 87 Squadron RAF
- Conflicts: World War I • Western Front
- Awards: Military Cross; Distinguished Flying Cross
- Other work: Commercial pilot in Australia and served in the Royal Australian Air Force during World War II

Captain Arthur Whitehair Vigers MC, DFC (20 January 1890 – September 1968) was a British World War I flying ace credited with 14 aerial victories. He was the third ranking of the 27 aces who flew the Sopwith Dolphin, and the highest scoring ace in his squadron.

== Early life and background ==
Vigers was born in Isleworth, Middlesex, the son of Thomas William Vigers and Margaret Mary (née Whitehair), and was educated at Mill Hill School, London. In 1908 he enlisted into the London Cable Signal Company, part of the London District Signals, a Territorial Force unit of the Royal Engineers Signal Service.

== World War I ==
Vigers was commissioned as a second lieutenant in the London Cable Signal Company on 5 September 1914, and on 9 December 1914 he was one of the many officers from the London Signal Companies who were seconded to the regular army.

On 11 July 1915 Vigers was appointed a temporary lieutenant. He received a mention in despatches for "gallant and distinguished service in the field" from Field-Marshal John French, the Commander-in-Chief of the British Army in France on 30 November 1915, and on 14 January 1916 he was awarded the Military Cross.

On 12 May 1917 Vigers was seconded for duty with Royal Flying Corps, being appointed a flying officer (observer), with seniority from 1 February 1917. He flew as an observer in No. 15 Squadron RFC, and was promoted to lieutenant on 1 July 1917. He then trained as a pilot, and was appointed a flying officer on 16 November 1917.

He was posted to No. 87 Squadron RAF to fly the Sopwith Dolphin single-seat fighter. He gained his first victories on 3 June 1918, shooting down two enemy fighter aircraft. On 10 August he accounted for three more, taking his total to five and making him an ace. He shot down three in August, and was appointed a flight commander with the temporary rank of captain on 1 September, going on to account for six more aircraft that month.

On 1 November 1918 Vigers was awarded the Distinguished Flying Cross. His citation read:

Lieutenant Arthur Whitehair Vigers, MC.

"A gallant and skilful airman. During the recent operations whilst leading a formation of eight machines he saw a group of twelve Fokker biplanes; without hesitation he attacked them, and, in the engagement, crashed two and shot down another out of control. Since June last he has crashed three enemy aeroplanes and driven down three out of control."

Vigers remained with No. 87 Squadron after the Armistice, receiving a second mention in despatches from Field-Marshal Sir Douglas Haig on 16 March 1919, and was again appointed a temporary captain on 1 May 1919.

=== List of aerial victories ===
Combat record
No.	Date and time	Aircraft/ Serial No.	Opponent	Result	Location	Notes
1	3 June 1918 @ 1835	Sopwith Dolphin (C4159)	Fokker Dr.I	Destroyed	Bray	
2	3 June 1918 @ 1835	Sopwith Dolphin (C4159)	Albatros D.V	Out of control	Bray–Herbécourt	
3	10 August 1918 @ 0920	Sopwith Dolphin (C4159)	Fokker D.VII	Destroyed	Misery	
4	10 August 1918 @ 0920	Sopwith Dolphin (C4159)	Fokker D.VII	Destroyed	Misery	
5	10 August 1918 @ 0920	Sopwith Dolphin (C4159)	Fokker D.VII	Out of control	Misery	
6	21 August 1918 @ 1745	Sopwith Dolphin (C4159)	Fokker D.VII	Destroyed	Biefvillers	
7	21 August 1918 @ 1745	Sopwith Dolphin (C4159)	Fokker D.VII	Out of control	Biefvillers	
8	25 August 1918 @ 1800	Sopwith Dolphin (C4159)	Fokker D.VII	Out of control	Velu Wood	
9	3 September 1918 @ 1830	Sopwith Dolphin (C4159)	Fokker D.VII	Destroyed	Épinoy	
10	3 September 1918 @ 1830	Sopwith Dolphin (C4159)	Fokker D.VII	Out of control	Épinoy	
11	16 September 1918 @ 1030	Sopwith Dolphin (C4159)	Rumpler C	Destroyed	North of Cambrai	
12	22 September 1918 @ 0910	Sopwith Dolphin (C4159)	Rumpler C	Out of control	North-east of Bapaume	Shared with Lieutenant Ross MacDonald.
13	23 September 1918 @ 1745	Sopwith Dolphin (C4159)	Fokker D.VII	Out of control	North-east of Cambrai	
14	23 September 1918 @ 1816	Sopwith Dolphin (C4159)	Fokker D.VII	Out of control	Bourlon Wood	

== Post-war career ==
Vigers left the RAF and moved to Australia, where he worked for the Sopwith Larkin Aviation Company, which had been founded by Herbert Joseph Larkin, who had served alongside Vigers as a flight commander in No. 87 Squadron. On 15 December 1919 Vigers announced his intention to make the first flight over the Bass Strait, from Melbourne to Launceston, Tasmania, in a Sopwith Gnu. However, he was forestalled by Lieutenant Arthur Leonard Long, who flew his Boulton Paul P.9 biplane from Stanley, Tasmania, to Melbourne on the 17th.

On 26 December 1919 Vigers took part in an air display organised by the Larkin Company at the Epsom racecourse, Mordialloc, to an audience of about 10,000. It began with Vigers, flying a Sopwith Dove, in a mock dogfight with Captain Roy King, in a Sopwith Gnu. There was then an air race between Vigers, King, and Long, in his Boulton Paul. The race, the first in Australia, was flown over the 37 miles (60 km) from the racecourse to a balloon tethered over Wirths' Park and back. Vigers won, but owing to a misunderstanding regarding the finish, Long and Vigers re-flew the race, with Long winning this time. Captain Gordon Campbell Wilson then made a parachute descent from the Gnu at about 2,000 feet (610 m), and Vigers made a mock attack on the racecourse, and gave an exhibition of aerobatics.

On 2 January 1920 Vigers took off from Glen Huntly to fly to various resorts around Port Phillip. In the passenger seat was Phillip Roff Nunn, an 18-year-old student from Elsternwick. However, on approaching Mornington, his engine failed. Vigers attempted a forced landing, but in avoiding crowds on the ground, hit telegraph wires, flipping the aircraft over, and smashing it into the ground. The two men were extricated from the wreckage, but Nunn died from his injuries a few days later. At the inquest it was proved that a fractured piston had caused the accident, and that Vigers was in no way to blame. By June Vigers had recovered from his injuries, and took his Sopwith Gnu with three passengers to an altitude of 15,200 feet (4,600 m), setting an Australian record for an aeroplane carrying more than one person. In August Vigers set off in his Sopwith Gnu on a two-week tour of Victoria with Howard Jolley and Dr J. Webb from the Life Insurance Company of Australia as passengers. However, on 2 August, while taking off from Kerang, the aircraft crashed. Fortunately no one was injured.

In mid-March 1923 Vigers flew the last of the Avro aeroplanes built by the Australian Aircraft & Engineering Company from Sydney to Melbourne. In May Vigers was surveying an air route from Adelaide to Sydney via Melbourne on behalf of the Defence Department. He and Air Mechanic G. Held successfully flew their Airco DH.9 from Sydney to Adelaide, but on the return flight crashed at Jerrawa near Yass. The aircraft was wrecked, but both men escaped with only minor injuries.

Vigers also worked for the Qantas Aerial Mail Service, until leaving in May 1924.

In November 1925 he was working for the West Australian Mail Service, taking part in the transportation by air of a body from Fitzroy Crossing on a 2,000-mile (3,200 km) flight to Perth, Western Australia, for burial.

Vigers married Marjorie Frances Vigers, of Kippington House, Sevenoaks, at St. Mary's Church, Kippington, Sevenoaks, Kent, on 10 August 1929.

He served in the Royal Australian Air Force during World War II.

Vigers died in Bunbury, Western Australia, in September 1968.
