= High Sheriff of the Isle of Wight =

Ceremonial officer of Isle of Wight, England

The position of High Sheriff of the Isle of Wight was created in 1974.

== Roll of High Sheriffs of the Isle of Wight ==
- 1974–1975 Lieut.-Colonel Claude Richard Henry Kindersley, of Hamstead Grange, Yarmouth.
- 1975–1976 Rear-Admiral Joseph Leslie Blackham, of " Downedge ", The Mall, Brading, Sandown.
- 1976–1977 Forester Richard John Britten, of St. Denis, High Street, Bembridge
- 1977–1978 Air Commodore James Michael Birkin, of Little Burneston, Ashlake Copse, Fishbourne.
- 1978–1979 Major-General Sir Robert Anthony Pigot, 7th Baronet, of Yew Tree Lodge, Love Lane, Bembridge
- 1979–1980 Eric Graham Feben, of Pound Cottage, Calbourne, Newport.
- 1980–1981 Michael St George Stephenson Clarke, of Shalcombe Manor, Yarmouth.
- 1981–1982 Denys Felton Peel, of Tyne Hall, Bembridge
- 1982–1983 William Thomas Cooper of Fishbourne, Ryde
- 1983–1984 Major General Oliver McCrea Roome, of Freshwater
- 1984–1985 Diana Mary Cameron Grey, of Bembridge
- 1985–1986 Victor Gordon Walker, of Stonelands, Binstead
- 1986–1987 Anthony John Sheldon, of Kings Manor, Freshwater
- 1987–1988 Henry Alfred Bowring of The Old Orchard, High Street, Bembridge
- 1988–1989 Roy James Westmore of Brooklyn, Chillerton, near Newport.
- 1989–1990 Christopher Donald Jack Bland of Yafford House, Yafford, Shorwell
- 1990–1991 Hugh Edric Calverley Noyes of Lisle Combe, St. Lawrence, Ventnor.
- 1991–1992 Donald Finlay Campbell, of Little East Standen Farm, Newport.
- 1992–1993 David Ernest John Guy, of Oakhill, Oakhill Road, Springvale, Seaview.
- 1993–1994 David Brian Barrie Cheverton
- 1994–1995 Michael George Ball of Ashen Grove Farm, Calbourne.
- 1995–1996 John James Woodward Attrill
- 1996–1997 Judith Anne Griffin of Briddlesford Lodge Farm, Wootton
- 1997–1998 Richard Linthorn Bradbeer
- 1998–1999 David C. Biles
- 1999–2000 Samuel Humfrey Gaskell Twining
- 2000–2001 Dr Charles A. N. Mobbs
- 2001–2002 Captain Henry N. J. Wrigley
- 2002–2003 Anne P. P. Springman
- 2003–2004 Judith K. Hammer
- 2004–2005 Anthony H. Goddard
- 2005–2006 Lieutenant Colonel J. H. (Danny) Fisher
- 2006–2007 Peter M.G.B. Grimaldi
- 2007–2008 Lieutenant Colonel David E. Langford
- 2008–2009 Alan Titchmarsh
- 2009–2010 Gabrielle Anne Lynam Edwards
- 2010–2011 Peter D. Kingston,
- 2011–2012 Susan Jean Sheldon
- 2012–2013 Nicholas W. T. Hayward
- 2013–2014 Mary L. Case
- 2014–2015 Claire E. B. Locke
- 2015–2016 Ronald Thomas Holland of Ryde
- 2016–2017 Robin Vandeleur Courage of Ryde, Isle of Wight
- 2017–2018 Ben M.A.S. Rouse of West Cowes
- 2018–2019 Gioia Maria Minghella–Giddens
- 2019–2020 Geoffrey Paul Underwood of Carisbrooke, Newport
- 2020–2021 Caroline Jane Peel of Bembridge
- 2021–2022 James R W Attrill, of Whitwell
- 2022–2023 Kay Ann Marriott of Cowes
- 2023–2024: Dawn Kirsten Haig–Thomas
- 2024–2025: Graham Robert Biss, of Freshwater
- 2025–2026: Jaqueline Anne Gazzard, of Sandown
- 2026–2027: Nigel Alan Hartley, of St Lawrence
