= Charles Darwin (RAF officer) =

English World War I flying ace

Charles John Wharton Darwin
- Born: 12 December 1894; Durham, England
- Died: 26 December 1941 (aged 47)
- Burial place: Golders Green Crematorium Middlesex, England
- Military career
- Allegiance: United Kingdom
- Branch: Royal Air Force
- Rank: Major
- Nickname: Johnny
- Units: No. 27 Squadron RAF, No. 87 Squadron RAF
- Awards: Distinguished Service Order

Squadron Leader Charles John Wharton Darwin DSO RAF (12 December 1894 – 26 December 1941) was a First World War flying ace credited with five aerial victories.

== Biography ==
Darwin was the son of Col. Charles Waring Darwin CB DL JP (1855–1928) of Elston Hall, Nottinghamshire (a second cousin once removed of the famous naturalist Charles Darwin) and his wife Mary Dorothea (née Wharton), the only daughter of the Rt Hon. John Lloyd Wharton MP. He was educated at Winchester School and the RMC Sandhurst.

Darwin served in France with the 2nd Battalion of the Coldstream Guards from 1914 to 1916. He then transferred to the Royal Flying Corps. His first assignment, to 27 Squadron, saw him flying a Martinsyde G.100. He then returned to England to instruct at the Central Flying School, Upavon, in 1917. When 87 Squadron was founded at Upavon in April 1918, Darwin led the effort. He accompanied the squadron into combat in France as a captain. When Major Joseph Callaghan was killed in action on 2 July 1918, Darwin succeeded to command. Flying Sopwith Dolphin no. C4158, Darwin destroyed four enemy planes and drove down a fifth one out of control between 31 May and 26 September 1918.

In 1918 he married Sybil Renee Rose, daughter of Charles Marston Rose and granddaughter of the late Sir Philip Rose, 1st Baronet. They had a son and two daughters:

- Christopher William Wharton Darwin (1918–1942), RAF officer killed in the Second World War
- Vivien Mary Darwin (1919–2014), married 1938, Claude Richard Henry Kindersley DSO MC
- Susan Anne Darwin (1923–?), married 1942 (div. 1948) Maj. Gilbert Ian Thwaites.

Post war, he remained in the Royal Air Force at the Central Flying School and at RAF Cranwell until his retirement in 1928. He then worked for the Bristol Aeroplane Company as their London manager. From 1936 he became manager of Saunders-Roe. He rejoined the RAF as a Squadron Leader, but died unexpectedly on 26 December 1941. He was cremated at Golders Green Crematorium.

== Honours and awards citations ==
Distinguished Service Order (DSO)

Capt. (A./Major) Charles John Wharton Darwin. (FRANCE)

This officer has proved himself, an exceptionally skilful and gallant patrol leader, conspicuous for utter fearlessness and disregard of danger. On a recent occasion, in company with one other machine, he attacked a formation of fourteen Fokker biplanes, one of which was shot down and crashed. He has accounted for three hostile aircraft. Supplement to the London Gazette, 8 February 1919 (31170/2031)
