= Geoffrey Allard =

British World War II flying ace

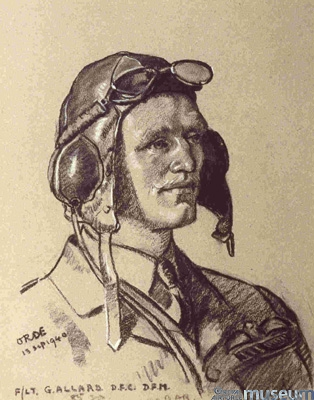
- Geoffrey Allard by Cuthbert Orde, 1940
- Born: 20 August 1912; York, England
- Died: 13 March 1941 (aged 28); Wimbish, Essex, England
- Burial place: Saffron Walden Cemetery
- Military career
- Allegiance: United Kingdom
- Branch: Royal Air Force
- Service years: 1929–1941
- Rank: Flight Lieutenant
- Nickname: Sammy
- Service number: 44551
- Units: No. 87 Squadron RAF; No. 85 Squadron RAF
- Conflicts: World War II: Battle of France; Battle of Britain
- Awards: Distinguished Flying Cross; Distinguished Flying Medal & Bar

Geoffrey "Sammy" Allard DFC, DFM & Bar (12 August 1912 – 13 March 1941) was a Royal Air Force (RAF) flying ace of the Second World War. He is credited with having shot down at least nineteen aircraft, with several more shared and unconfirmed.

Born in York, Allard joined the RAF in 1929 as an aircraft apprentice. Qualifying as a metal rigger when his training was complete, in 1936 he applied for pilot training. He became a sergeant pilot in October 1937 and was posted to No. 87 Squadron. At the time of the outbreak of the Second World War, he was serving with No. 85 Squadron which was subsequently sent to France. He flew Hawker Hurricane fighters extensively during the Battle of France, claiming several aerial victories. Briefly rested due to the hectic nature of the French campaign, he was awarded the Distinguished Flying Medal (DFM) in recognition of his successes. The squadron was heavily engaged during the Battle of Britain and Allard destroyed a number of aircraft, for which he was awarded a Bar to his DFM, and, after his commissioning as a pilot officer, the Distinguished Flying Cross. He died in a flying accident on 13 March 1941.

== Early life ==
Geoffrey Allard was born in York, in England, on 20 August 1912, the son of Sydney and Elizabeth Allard. He was educated at Priory Higher Grade School before joining the Royal Air Force (RAF) in September 1929 as an aircraft apprentice. Nicknamed 'Sammy', he trained at the apprentice school at Halton and qualified as a leading aircraftman metal rigger three years later.

Allard's first posting was to the RAF College at Cranwell, where he was on the maintenance staff. In March 1936 he was transferred to No. 2 Armament Training Camp at North Coates. The same year he volunteered for pilot training and was accepted. His initial training commenced in December, at No. 2 Elementary and Reserve Flying Training School in Filton, and the following March he proceeded to No. 9 Flying Training School at Thornaby. His training was completed in October and he was posted as a sergeant pilot to No. 87 Squadron. The squadron was based at Debden and operated the Gloster Gladiator biplane fighter.

In June 1938, Allard was transferred to No. 85 Squadron. This was being reformed, having been disestablished following the First World War. Like his previous unit, which contributed a flight to the new squadron, it was based at Debden and equipped with Gladiators. A few months later it began to reequip with the Hawker Hurricane fighter.

== Second World War ==
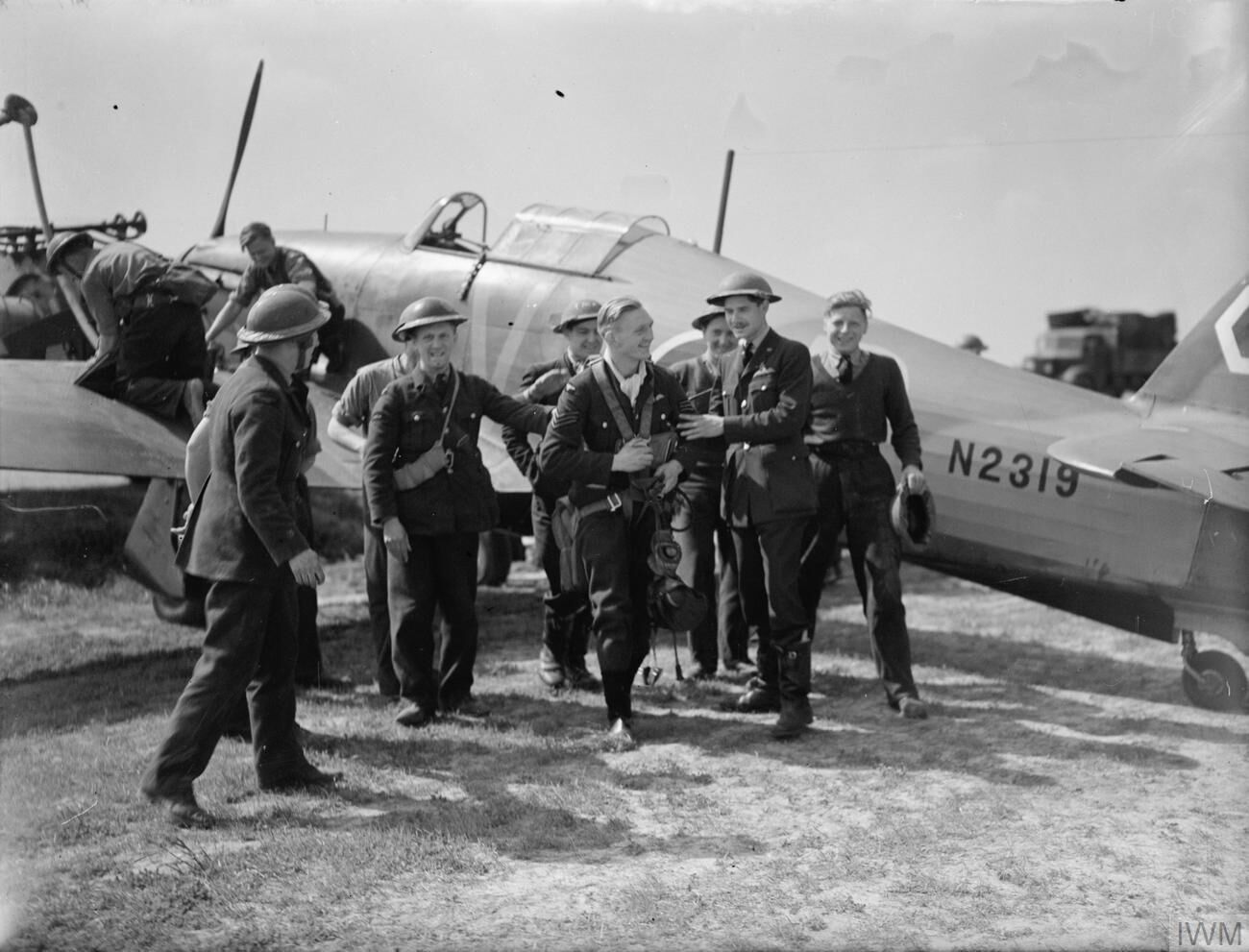
Allard, centre, wearing a parachute, is congratulated by his ground crew after destroying a Heinkel He 111 medium bomber on 10 May 1940

On the outbreak of the Second World War, No. 85 Squadron was sent to France as part of the Air Component of the British Expeditionary Force. It flew patrols and was occasionally called upon to intercept intruding Luftwaffe aircraft from its bases in Lille-Seclin and Merville. It saw little action until 10 May 1940, when the Battle of France, the German invasion, commenced. The squadron was immediately and frequently engaged.

=== Battle of France ===
Over the period 10 to 16 May, Allard is reported to have destroyed ten aircraft; three Heinkel He 111 medium bombers were destroyed on 10 May alone, although two of these could not be confirmed. The details of the remainder of Allard's aerial victories from the Battle of France are not available due to the loss of the squadron's records in France. He became so exhausted that after landing his Hurricane after his last sortie of the day on 17 May, he was found fast asleep in the cockpit by his ground crew. He was sent on leave and by the time he returned, the squadron had become non-operational and was back at Debden. Allard was awarded the Distinguished Flying Medal (DFM) in recognition of his successes. The citation, published on 31 May in The London Gazette, read,

This airman has shown outstanding flying ability and at all times his coolness and confidence have assisted all pilots who have flown with him. He has been largely responsible for keeping up the high morale and fighting ability of his section. Altogether in his combats during recent days he has destroyed four enemy aircraft. Without exception he has pressed home his attack with outstanding courage which has been a fine example to his section.

— London Gazette, No. 34860, 31 May 1940.

=== Battle of Britain ===
No. 85 Squadron was non-operational briefly while it rebuilt to full strength and commenced training in night fighting. When it resumed operations it still carried out day sorties, intercepting bombers over Kent. By July it was increasingly active as the Luftwaffe increased its operations against the southeast of England. Allard engaged and destroyed a He 111 10 mi (16 km) to the southeast of Felixstowe on 8 July. At the end of the month, he shared in the destruction of a Messerschmitt Bf 110 heavy fighter southeast of Southwold. On 6 August he and two other pilots were credited with the destruction of a Dornier Do 17 medium bomber. He was commissioned as a pilot officer on 17 August and due to losses, was promoted acting flight lieutenant and appointed flight commander.

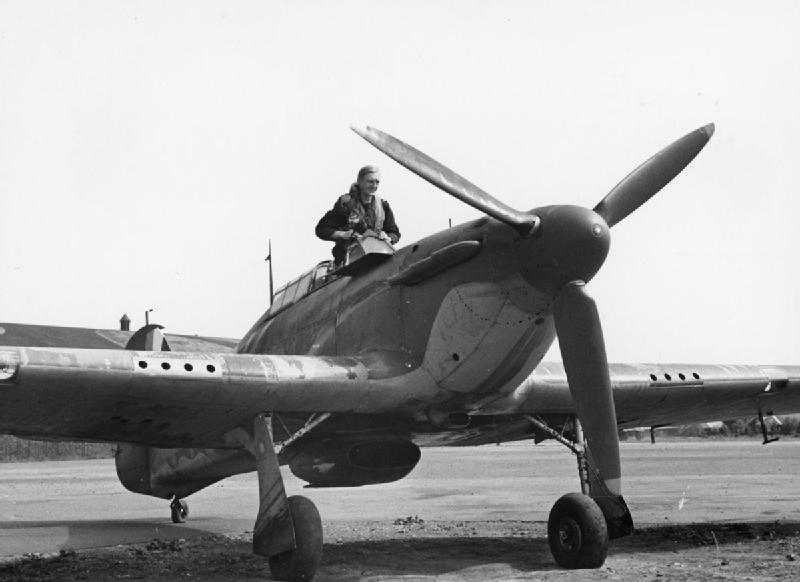
Allard in his Hawker Hurricane fighter, July 1940

On 24 August Allard shot down a Messerschmitt Bf 109 fighter off Ramsgate and two days later shared in the destruction of three Do 17s; two over Maidstone and the last over Croydon. On 28 August, near Folkestone, he destroyed a pair of Bf 109s. A couple of days afterwards, he shot down two He 111s near Bethenden and the following day claimed two Do 17s as probably destroyed to the southeast of London and shot down a Bf 109 near Dover. On 1 September he destroyed a Bf 109 10 mi (16 km) from Cap Gris-Nez. The same day, he shot down a Do 17 to the southeast of Lydd. Shortly afterwards the squadron was rested from operations with an assignment to Church Fenton, in Northern England, to resume training as a night fighter squadron. An award of a Bar to Allard's DFM was announced on 13 September.

In October No. 85 Squadron became operational as a night fighter unit, based at Kirton-in-Lindsey. Allard was awarded a Distinguished Flying Cross (DFC) the same month, recognising his successes of late August to early September. The published citation read,

Between 30th August and 1st September, 1940, this officer destroyed seven enemy aircraft; previously he had destroyed ten and shared in the destruction of others. He has displayed outstanding skill and courage in combat against the enemy.

— London Gazette, No. 34964, 8 October 1940.

No. 85 Squadron moved to Gravesend in November to rejoin No. 11 Group, becoming one of the busiest night fighter squadrons in the region. The next month, Allard's substantive rank was made up to flying officer. In March 1941, the squadron, which had recently moved back to Debden, began converting to twin-engined Douglas Havoc heavy fighters. On 13 March, Allard took off in a Havoc from Debden, accompanied by Pilot Officers Francis Walker-Smith and William Hodgson, both veterans of the Battle of Britain. It is believed that shortly after take-off a panel on the Havoc's fuselage worked loose and flew back jamming the rudder, causing Allard to lose control and crash near Wimbish, killing all three occupants.

Allard is buried at the Saffron Walden Cemetery in Essex. He is credited with having destroyed twenty-two aircraft, five of which were shared with other pilots. Included in this total is at least two unconfirmed. The details of some of these, all shot down during the fighting in France, are not available. He is also credited with the probable destruction of two aircraft.

== Legacy ==
Allard's medals which, in addition to the DFC and DFM and Bar, also included the 1939–1945 Star with Battle of Britain clasp, the Air Crew Europe Star, and the War Medal 1939–1945, are held by the Royal Air Force Museum. In March 2011, 70 years after his death, a road in Saffron Walden, "Allard Way", was named for him.

== Bibliography ==
- Bishop, Patrick (2003). Fighter Boys: Saving Britain 1940. London: HarperCollins. ISBN 0-00-257169-2.
- Rawlings, John (1976). Fighter Squadrons of the RAF and their Aircraft. London: MacDonald & James. ISBN 0-354-01028-X.
- Shores, Christopher; Williams, Clive (1994). Aces High: A Tribute to the Most Notable Fighter Pilots of the British and Commonwealth Forces in WWII. London: Grub Street. ISBN 1-8-9869-7000.
