= C. R. H. Kindersley =

C. R. H. Kindersley DSO MC DL
- Born: Claude Richard Henry Kindersley; 11 December 1911
- Died: 31 March 1993 (aged 81)
- Education: Wellington College, Berkshire
- Spouse: Vivien Mary
- Children: 3
- Relatives: Archibald Ogilvie Lyttelton Kindersley
- Military career
- Allegiance: British
- Unit: Highland Light Infantry
- Commands: 1st Battalion
- Awards: Military Cross
- Other work: Deputy Lieutenant for Hampshire

Claude Richard Henry Kindersley DSO MC DL (11 December 1911 – 31 March 1993) was a British soldier.

Kindersley was the son of Lt-Col Archibald Ogilvie Lyttelton Kindersley CMG, and his wife Edith Mary Kindersley (née Craven). He was educated at Wellington College and Trinity College, Cambridge.

He was commissioned into the Highland Light Infantry in 1933. He served with the 2nd Battalion of the HLI at the North-West Frontier, and in Palestine and the Middle East from 1936 to 1943. He was awarded the Military Cross in 1943. He continued his career with the 1st Battalion in France and Germany, 1944–45, where he was awarded the DSO. He commanded the 1st Battalion in 1945.

After the war, he was a Deputy Lieutenant for Hampshire from 1962 to 1974 and for the Isle of Wight from 1974, after the island became a separate county from Hants. He was the first High Sheriff of the Isle of Wight, 1974–75.

In 1938 he married Vivien Mary, daughter of the late Charles John Wharton Darwin of Elston Hall, Nottinghamshire; they had three daughters.
