= John Cock (RAF officer) =

Australian flying ace

John Reynolds Cock
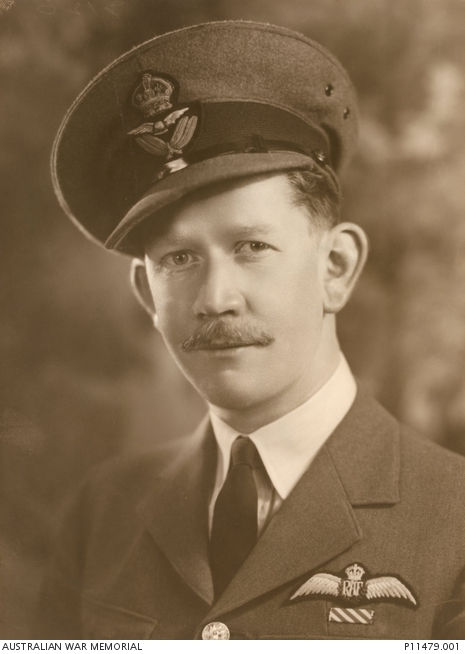
- Born: 3 March 1918; Renmark, South Australia, Australia
- Died: 20 August 1988 (aged 70); Tewantin, Queensland, Australia
- Military career
- Allegiance: Australia
- Branch: Royal Air Force
- Rank: Squadron Leader
- Units: No. 3 Squadron; No. 222 Squadron; No. 453 Squadron; No. 87 Squadron
- Commands: No. 72 Squadron
- Conflicts: Second World War; Phoney War; Battle of France; Battle of Britain
- Awards: Distinguished Flying Cross

John Reynolds Cock, DFC (3 March 1918 – 20 August 1988) was an Australian-born flying ace of the Royal Air Force (RAF) during the Second World War. He was credited with at least ten aerial victories.

From South Australia, Cock joined the RAF in March 1938. After completing his flight training the following year, he was posted to No. 87 Squadron. Sent to France as part of the Air Component of the British Expeditionary Force, he flew Hawker Hurricane fighters in the Battle of France and the subsequent Battle of Britain, achieving a number of aerial victories. He served for a period as an instructor before resuming operational flying with No. 453 Squadron. Sent to Australia in early 1943, he was based at Darwin with No. 1 Fighter Wing for several months before returning to Europe to serve with No. 3 Squadron, flying Hawker Tempest fighters. He spent the final months of the war in East Africa. He remained in the RAF after the war, commanding No. 72 Squadron, in Austria, for several months. His service with the RAF ended in early 1948 and he returned to Australia where he died in 1988.

== Early life ==
John Reynolds Cock was born on 3 March 1918 in the South Australian town of Renmark, in Australia, the son of Vincent Cock, an irrigation engineer and his wife. The family later resided at nearby Berri. Cock attended Renmark High School and excelled in swimming. Interested in aviation, he began flying at the age of 16 and in 1938, having accumulated nearly 50 hours of flying time, he applied for a short service commission in the Royal Air Force (RAF).

Travelling to England for training, Cock passed the first phase of flight instruction and was granted his commission on 7 May as an acting pilot officer under probation. Completing his training in December, he was posted to No. 87 Squadron, based at Debden and operating the Hawker Hurricane fighter. Cock's status as a pilot officer was confirmed on 7 March 1939.

== Second World War ==
On the commencement of the Second World War, No. 87 Squadron was sent to France as part of No. 60 Wing, the Air Component of the British Expeditionary Force. Based at Lille for most of the Phoney War, the squadron patrolled along the front lines and sought to intercept Luftwaffe aircraft. In April, the squadron moved to Le Touquet. It was flying from here that Cock achieved his first claimed aerial victory on 10 April, a Heinkel He 111 medium bomber that was shot down into the sea.

=== Battle of France ===
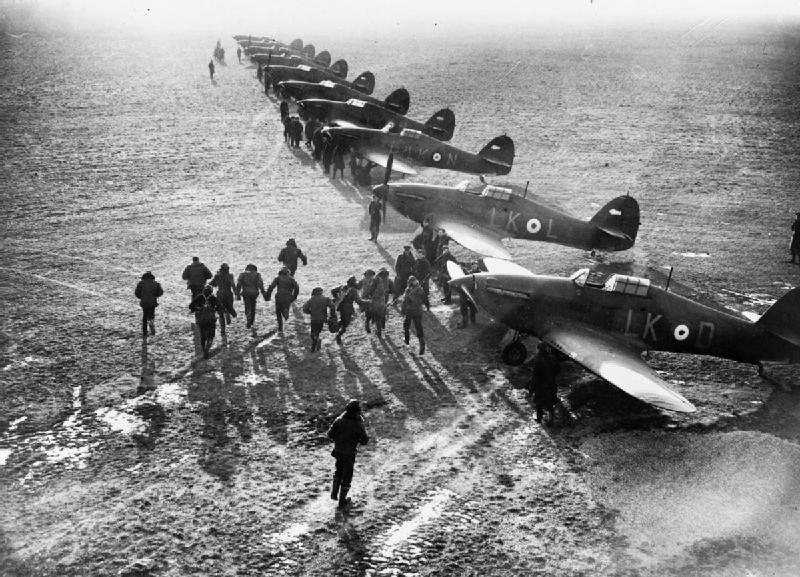
Pilots of No. 87 Squadron on a practice scramble at the airfield at Lille, 1939

Aerial operations intensified once the Battle of France began on 10 May, when Cock damaged a Dornier Do 17 medium bomber and a Messerschmitt Bf 110 heavy fighter and destroyed a Junkers Ju 88 medium bomber, the latter two south of Lille. Two days later he shot down a He 111 near a bridge over the Meuse and on 14 May destroyed a Messerschmitt Bf 109 fighter over Louvain. He claimed a Ju 88 destroyed near Le Cateau on 16 May but this was unable to be confirmed. He shot down a Junkers Ju 87 dive bomber east of Brussels and damaged another on 18 May. The following day, he was one of four pilots that shared in the destruction of a Henschel Hs 126 reconnaissance aircraft over Courtrai. The squadron withdrew to England on 22 May, returning to Debden following an intensive 12 days of aerial warfare.

=== Battle of Britain ===
At Debden, the squadron underwent a refit and became operational again on 21 June. At the start of July, the squadron moved to Exeter, as part of No. 10 Group which defended the south-west coast of England. It remained here for the duration of the Battle of Britain. On 10 July, he damaged a Dornier Do 215 medium bomber. A flight from No. 87 Squadron was also involved in night fighting and on the night of 26 July, Cock shot down a He 111 about 1 mi (1.6 km) to the east of Portland.

On 11 August the squadron was scrambled to intercept Ju 88 bombers that had just attacked fuel storage tanks at Portland. Cock destroyed a Bf 109 as he sought to catch the bombers. He engaged and destroyed one Ju 88 and probably destroyed another. He also claimed a Bf 110 as a probable but his Hurricane was damaged by cannon and machine gun fire. Slightly wounded in the shoulder, he bailed out of his aircraft with some difficulty, having briefly become stuck. As he descended under his parachute, a Bf 109 fired on him. Although he was not hurt, a number of cords connecting the parachute to his harness were severed. Another RAF fighter dealt with the Bf 109, leaving Cock to land in the English Channel. Discarding his boots and trousers he swam to shore. This incident resulted in him being placed on a month's leave.

By the time of Cock's return to No. 87 Squadron the following month, the Luftwaffe was attacking London and aircraft factories in the south of England, some being in the area of No. 10 Group. In the interim, he had been promoted to flying officer. On 26 September, while flying over Sidmouth, he destroyed a Ju 88 and damaged a Bf 109. Two days later, while intercepting one of the last daylight raids mounted by the Luftwaffe, an attack on a Yeovil aircraft factory, he shot down another Ju 88 and probably destroyed a Bf 109. During the engagement with the Ju 88, he came close to colliding with it.

In early October, the Luftwaffe began using Bf 109s as fighter-bombers, making high speed dashes on targets in the south of England. On 10 October, Cock engaged and probably destroyed a Bf 109 over Portland, his last aerial victory. Later in the month, on 24 October, he was involved in a collision; patrolling at 3,000 ft (910 m) the engine of his Hurricane failed and the sudden deceleration caught out the pilot of the following Hurricane, which crashed into the rear fuselage of Cock's aircraft. Cock was able to make a forced landing but the other pilot was killed. The following day, Cock was awarded the Distinguished Flying Cross (DFC); the citation, published in The London Gazette, read

This officer has destroyed seven enemy aircraft. In August, 1940, when in action against a large formation of enemy aircraft, he attacked and destroyed a Junkers 88. During this combat he was attacked from below and his aircraft caught fire. Though wounded, he escaped by parachute and fell into the sea, but saved himself by swimming ashore. Flying Officer Cock has shown magnificent courage and initiative against overwhelming odds.

— London Gazette, No. 34978, 25 October

=== Later service ===
In November No. 87 Squadron moved to Colerne and began to concentrate on night fighting. The following month, Cock was posted to No. 2 Central Flying School to train as a flight instructor and early the following year was sent to No. 9 Flying Training School. He remained here until August 1941, when he was posted to No. 28 Elementary Flying Training School. Soon afterwards he was promoted to flight lieutenant. In July 1942, he returned to operational flying with a posting to No. 453 Squadron, a new Australian fighter squadron, as a flight leader. The squadron, based at Drem and equipped with Supermarine Spitfire fighters, was engaged in convoy patrols and interception duties. It moved south to Hornchurch in September but Cock was then sent to the Central Gunnery School (CGS).

After completing his course at the CGS, Cock was briefly attached to an American squadron, the 93rd Fighter-Interceptor Squadron, in October before being transferred to No. 222 Squadron, based at Ayr in Scotland. In November, he was sent to Australia on attachment to the Royal Australian Air Force, initially based in Sydney. In May 1943 he was posted to No. 1 Fighter Wing, based at Darwin as part of the fighter defences protecting the north of Australia from aerial attacks by the Japanese. He worked on improving the gunnery skills of the fighter pilots and also flew Spitfires as a supernumerary pilot with No. 54 Squadron, a British unit serving at Darwin. At the start of the following year, he was promoted to temporary squadron leader. Later in 1944, he returned to England and in September was posted to No. 3 Squadron, which operated Hawker Tempest fighters as bomber escorts and ground support.

From April to August 1945, Cock was based in Khartoum, in east Africa, where he tested the Hawker Tempest II. He ended the war credited with the destruction of 10 German aircraft, and a share in another shot down. He also had one unconfirmed aircraft destroyed, four probably destroyed and five damaged.

== Later life ==
In February 1946, Cock was appointed commander of No. 72 Squadron. His command, part of the Occupation Force in Austria, was based at Zeltweg and operated the Spitfire LF.IX on patrols along the border with Yugoslavia. The squadron's operations were beginning to wind down as Britain shifted back to a peacetime footing and in December it was disbanded. By this time, Cock's short service commission had been extended but in early January 1948, he ended his service with the RAF.

Cock returned to Australia, settling in Queensland where he established and operated a supermarket for several years. He retired in 1983 and the same year, parts of the Hurricane from which he bailed out on 11 August 1940 were retrieved from the sea off Portland by aviation archaeologists. Cock had travelled to England for the occasion. He died in Tewantin, Queensland, on 20 August 1988. His daughter sold his medals which, in addition to the DFC, also included the 1939–1945 Star with Battle of Britain clasp, the Air Crew Europe Star with France and Germany Clasp, the Pacific Star, the Defence Medal and the War Medal.
