= Joseph Leslie Blackham =

Rear-Admiral Joseph Leslie Blackham CB DL
- Born: 29 February 1912; Warwickshire, England
- Died: 18 May 2004 (aged 92); Isle of Wight, Hampshire, England
- Military career
- Allegiance: United Kingdom
- Branch: Royal Navy
- Rank: Rear-Admiral
- Conflicts: Second World War; Korean War
- Awards: Companion of the Order of the Bath
- Other work: High Sheriff of the Isle of Wight

Rear-Admiral Joseph Leslie Blackham CB DL (29 February 1912 – 18 May 2004) was a Royal Navy officer. He saw service in the Second World War and in the Korean War. He was appointed CB in 1965 and was later High Sheriff of the Isle of Wight.
