= Henry Biziou =

- Henry Arthur Richard Biziou
- Born: 18 September 1894; Farnborough, Hampshire, England
- Died: 14 July 1919 (aged 24); Farnborough, Hampshire, England
- Burial place: Aldershot Military Cemetery, Hampshire, England
- Military career
- Allegiance: United Kingdom
- Branch: Royal Navy; British Army; Royal Air Force
- Service years: 1914–1919
- Rank: Captain
- Nickname: "Weegee"
- Units: No. 42 Squadron RFC; No. 87 Squadron RAF
- Conflicts: First World War
- Awards: Distinguished Flying Cross

Captain Henry Arthur Richard Biziou, DFC (18 September 1894 – 14 July 1919) was a British flying ace of the First World War, credited with eight aerial victories. After serving successively in the Royal Navy and the British Army, he transferred to the Royal Air Force. After service as an observer, he trained as a fighter pilot and subsequently won his victories. He survived the war, only to die in a midair collision.

== Early life ==
Biziou was born on 18 September 1894. He would become known as "Weegee" in later life.

== First World War ==
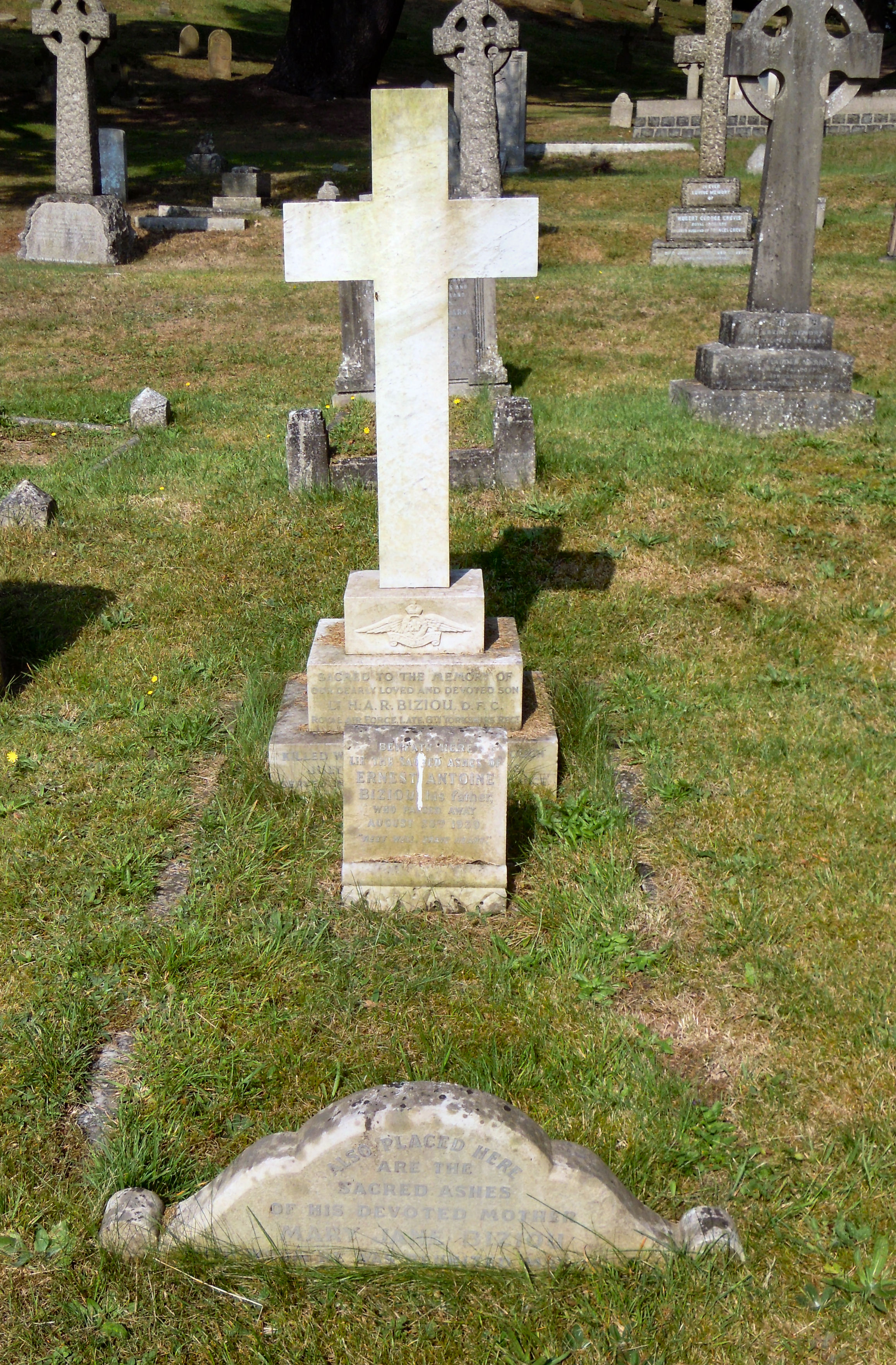
Biziou's grave in Aldershot Military Cemetery.

Biziou joined the Royal Navy as a mechanic on 29 October 1914. He was later commissioned and transferred to the infantry; Petty Officer Biziou, formerly of the Royal Naval Armoured Car Division, was promoted to temporary second lieutenant in the Infantry on 24 February 1916.

Biziou served in the 6th (Service) Battalion, Yorkshire Regiment at Gallipoli, Egypt and France. He was still with the regiment when, on 31 May 1916, he was posted to the army's General List as a temporary second lieutenant to meet wartime needs.

Biziou began duty as an aerial observer, probably with No. 42 Squadron, on 6 October 1916, and was transferred to the Royal Flying Corps General List on 23 November 1916. On 1 April 1917, he was promoted to temporary lieutenant.

Biziou then trained as a pilot, including the course at the School of Special Flying at Gosport. He was then posted to No. 87 Squadron and landed in France in April 1918. He flew a Sopwith Dolphin, and scored the squadron's first victory on 6 May. Over time, he ran off a tally of two reconnaissance planes and five fighters destroyed, and another fighter driven down out of control by 22 September. In the midst of this string of victories, Biziou was promoted to temporary captain on 2 July.

The Distinguished Flying Cross he had won for his exploits was gazetted on 3 December 1918, reading:

Lieutenant (Acting-Captain) Henry Arthur Richard Biziou. A most successful leader of marked gallantry. During recent operations he has destroyed four enemy aeroplanes and driven down one out of control; two of these he accounted for in one engagement on 15 September with a number of Fokker biplanes. In addition he has driven down a hostile balloon.

== Later life and death ==
Biziou remained in the Royal Air Force after the war, and was stationed at RAF Farnborough. He was killed on 14 July 1919 in a flying accident at Farnborough, when his S.E.5 collided in mid-air with an Avro 504 killing him and the pilot and mechanic of the other aircraft. He is buried in Aldershot Military Cemetery.

== Bibliography ==
- Shores, Christopher F.; Franks, Norman; Guest, Russell (1990). Above the Trenches: A Complete Record of the Fighter Aces and Units of the British Empire Air Forces 1915–1920. London, UK: Grub Street. ISBN 0-948817-19-4.
