= No. 87 Squadron RAF =

Defunct flying squadron of the Royal Air Force

No. 87 (United Provinces) Squadron RAF
- Active: 1 September 1917 – 24 June 1919; 15 March 1937 – 30 Dec 1946; 1 January 1952 – 3 January 1961
- Country: United Kingdom
- Branch: Royal Air Force
- Nickname: United Provinces
- Mottos: Latin: Maximus me metuit ("The most powerful fear me") (Note: A "lazy S" mark, based on Wild West-style ranch branding, was the squadron's World War One identity marking early in its existence, this became a serpent in the badge.)

Insignia
- Squadron badge heraldry: A serpent reversed, head reguardant and tail embowed
- Squadron codes: PD Oct 1938 – Sep 1939; LK Sep 1939 – Dec 1946; B Jan 1952 – Jan 1961
- Squadron Roundel

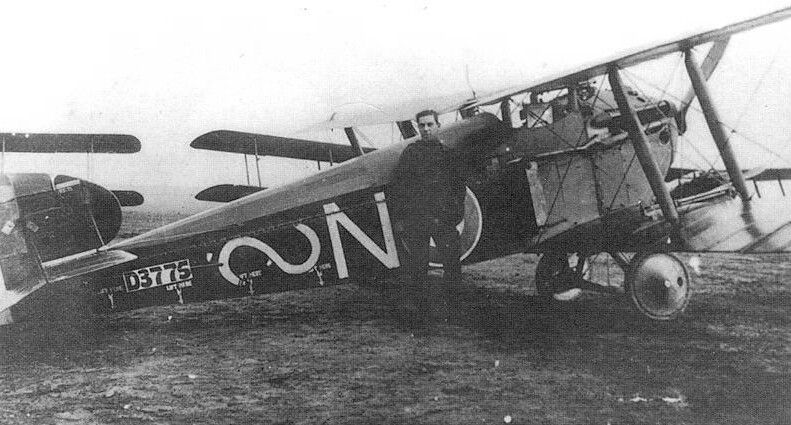
A Sopwith Dolphin of No.87 Squadron in France, 1918 – the squadron's "lazy-S" unit insignia of that time is painted in white.

No. 87 Squadron RAF was an aircraft squadron of the Royal Air Force during the First World War and Second World War.

== World War I ==
87 Squadron Royal Flying Corps (RFC) was first formed on 1 September 1917 at Upavon from elements of the Central Flying School. On 17 December 1917, it moved to Hounslow Heath Aerodrome and was equipped predominantly with Sopwith Dolphins and Sopwith Scouts, moving on to France in April 1918. After the armistice, the squadron moved back to England and was disbanded at RAF Ternhill on 24 June 1919. The squadron had seven aces, in Arthur Vigers DFC, Leslie Hollinghurst, (Note: later a senior RAF commander and member of the Air Force Board) Henry Biziou, Joseph Callaghan, (Note: a commanding officer of 87 Squadron for a time) Charles Darwin, Herbert Joseph Larkin, Alexander Pentland, and Charles Edward Worthington. The squadron's "lazy-S" style insignia in use late in World War I on its Dolphins is said to have been authorised for use by CO Callaghan, whose pre-war time living in Texas, where livestock branding on ranch livestock was common there at that time, could have inspired his choice of squadron insignia.

== World War II ==
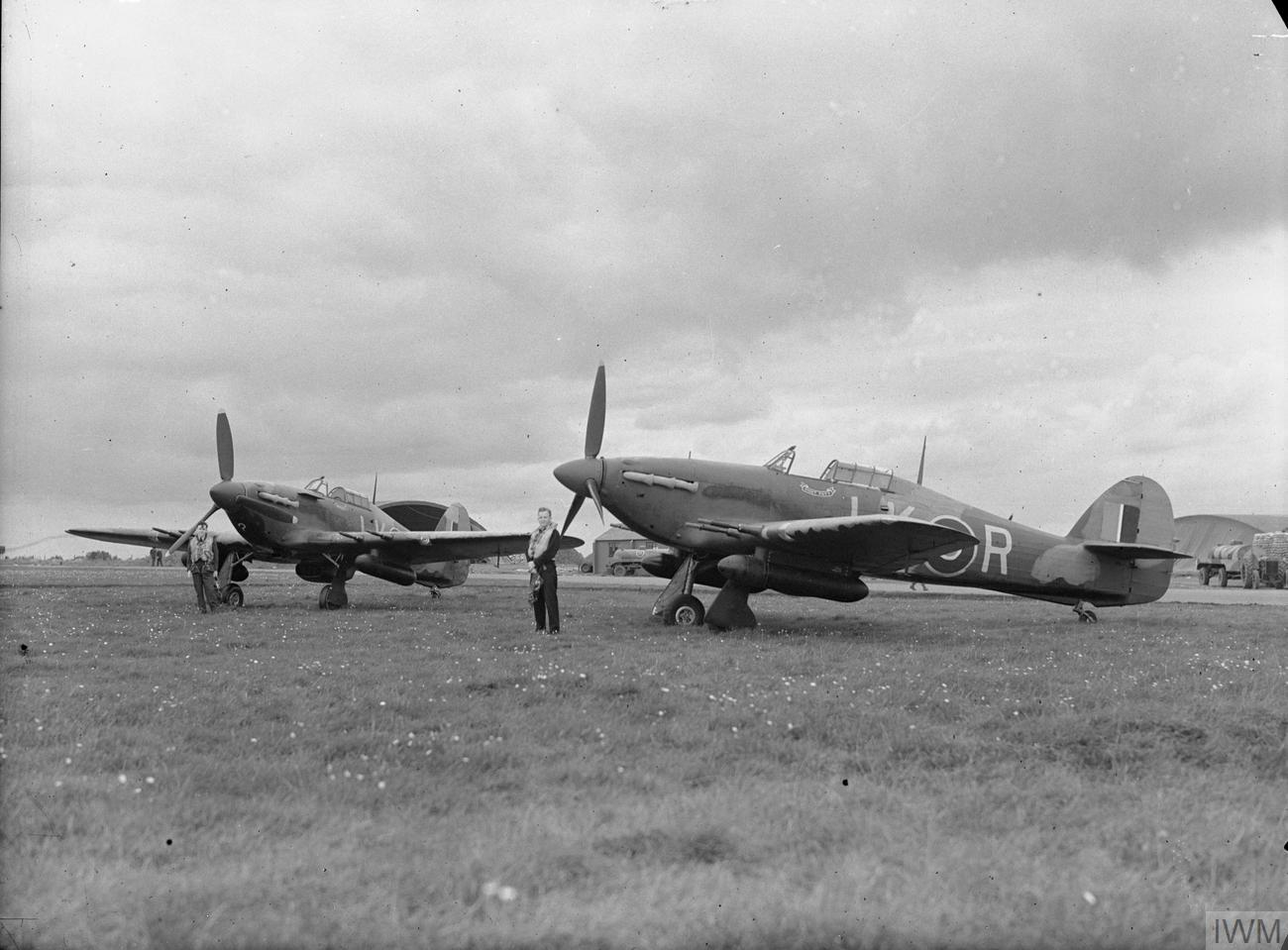
Two 87 Squadron Hawker Hurricane Mark IIC night fighters at RAF Charmy Down

87 Squadron was re-formed on 15 March 1937 at RAF Tangmere from elements of No. 54 Squadron RAF, operating the Hawker Fury. At the outbreak of the Second World War, the squadron was part of the air element of the British Expeditionary Force in France, equipped with Hawker Hurricanes. Flight Lieutenant Ian Gleed was posted to the squadron as a replacement pilot on 17 May 1940 and became an ace in two days. He took command of the squadron in December 1940 when it was based at RAF Charmy Down.

John Strachey, who later became a member of parliament (MP), served as the intelligence officer for the squadron during the Battle of Britain. On 23 July Flt Lt AWG Le Hardy (Tony) took command before being sent on Special Operations as the Air Liaison Officer to the Military Mission to Marshal Tito on the island of Vis off the Dalmatian coast of Croatia. Squadron Spitfires were deployed to the island in support of the commando forces from the airfield organised by A/Sqn Ldr Le Hardy for operations in support of the partisan forces in the Balkans for which he was decorated with the OBE, the youngest officer to receive that award, aged 21. The airfield became a valuable destination for damaged Allied Aircraft saving many lives. {Flying Log Book A Le Hardy OBE RAF}.

In July 1944 87 Squadron, now commanded by Squadron Leader Geoffrey Garton, became one of two RAF Squadrons to join No. 8 Wing SAAF (the other being RAF 185 Squadron) and began fighter-bomber operations supporting the fighting in Italy as well as taking part in offensive sweeps across the Balkans from its detached Italian bases. It continued in this role in the Italian Campaign until the end of the war.

== The Cold War ==
87 Squadron was again re-formed as part of the 2nd Tactical Air Force in Germany on 1 January 1952 at RAF Wahn with the Gloster Meteor NF11, with the main tasking being the defence of the Ruhr. After five years it moved to RAF Bruggen, and was equipped with the Gloster Javelin as an all-weather interceptor force until it was disbanded on 3 January 1961.

== Aircraft ==
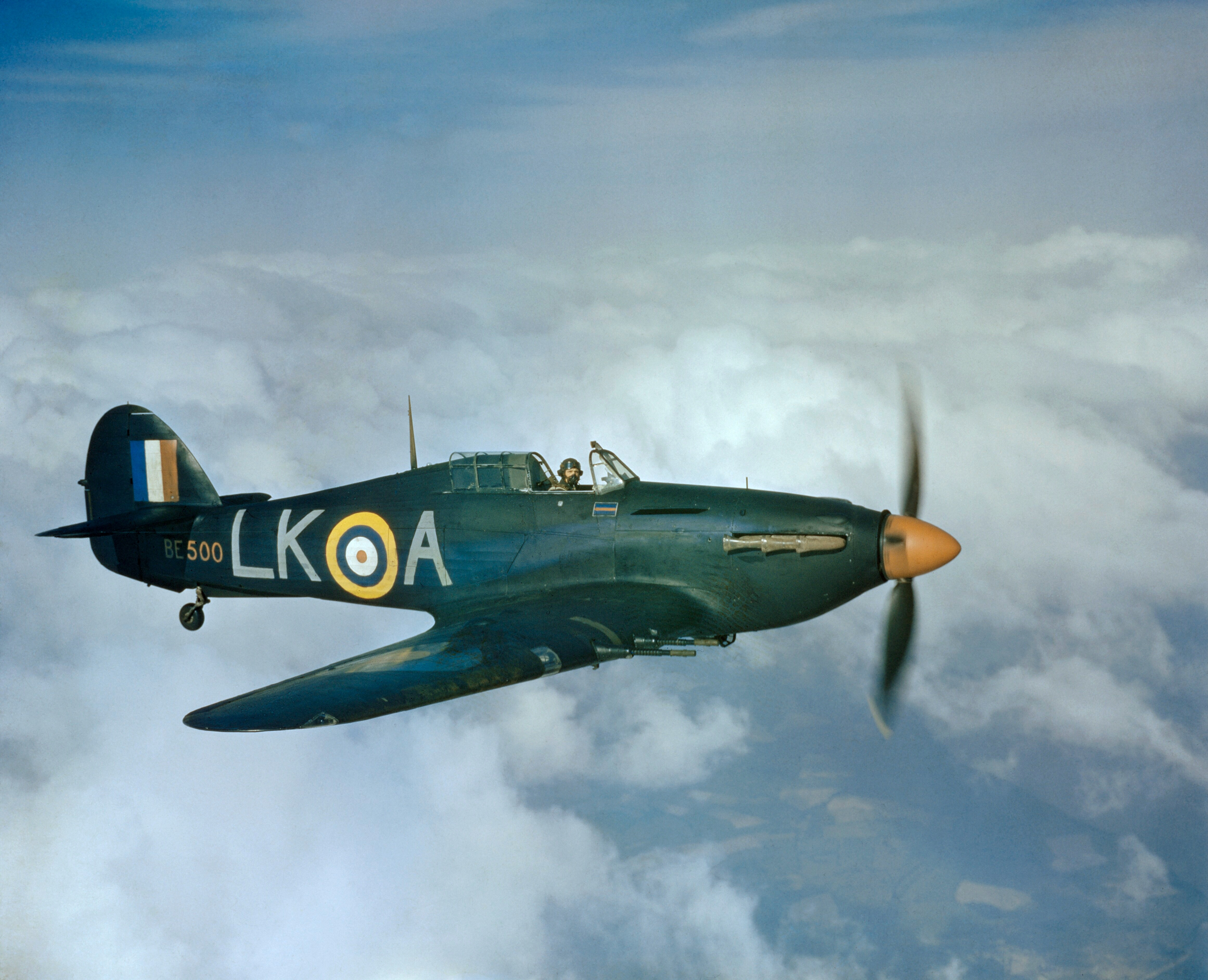
No. 87 CO Sqn Ldr Denis Smallwood, in his Hurricane IIC, in early 1942

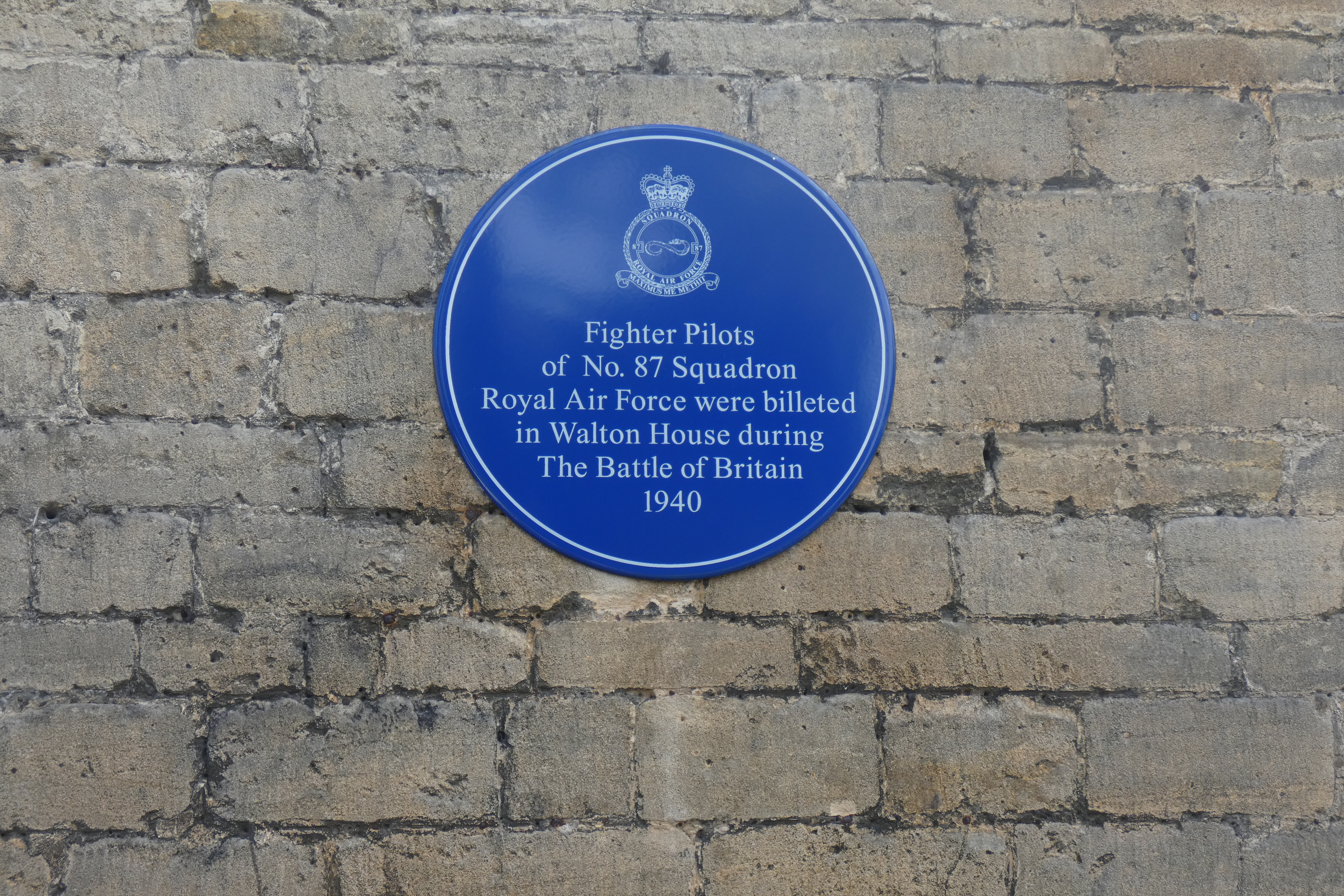
Blue plaque on Walton House, Northleach, Gloucestershire, commemorating its use as billets by pilots of No. 87 Squadron during the Battle of Britain, probably while it was stationed at RAF Bibury nearby; includes squadron's heraldic 'serpent' badge.

Aircraft operated
Dates	Aircraft	Variant	Notes
1917–1919	Sopwith Dolphin		Single-engined piston biplane fighter
1937-1937	Hawker Fury	II	Single-engined piston biplane fighter
1937–1938	Gloster Gladiator	I	Single-engined piston biplane fighter
1938–1942	Hawker Hurricane	I	Single-engined piston monoplane fighter
1941–1944	Hawker Hurricane	IIC	
1943–1944	Supermarine Spitfire	IX, VB, VC VIII	Single-engined piston monoplane fighter
1944–1946	Supermarine Spitfire	IX	
1952–1957	Gloster Meteor	NF11	Twin-engined jet night fighter
1957–1961	Gloster Javelin	FAW1	Twin-engined all weather and night interceptor
1958–1960	Gloster Javelin	FAW5	
1959–1961	Gloster Javelin	FAW4	

== Notable pilots ==
=== World War I ===
- Charles J.W. Darwin
- Herbert Larkin
- Arthur Vigers
- Richard Alexander Hewat

=== World War II ===
- Geoffrey Allard
- Roland Beamont
- John Cock
- John Dewar
- Ian Gleed DSO DFC
- Derek Harland Ward
- Denis Smallwood
