= William Hodgson (RAF officer) =

New Zealand flying ace

William Henry Hodgson
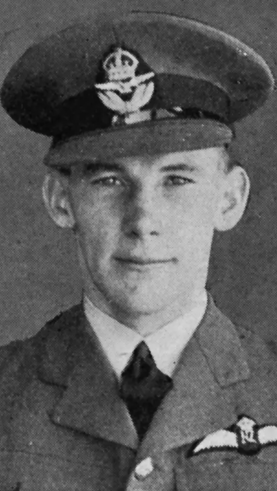
- Born: 30 September 1920; Frankton Junction, New Zealand
- Died: 13 March 1941 (aged 20) near Debden, England
- Military career
- Allegiance: New Zealand
- Branch: Royal Air Force (1940–1941); Royal New Zealand Air Force (1939–1940)
- Service years: 1939–1941
- Rank: Pilot officer
- Unit: No. 85 Squadron
- Conflicts: Second World War; Battle of Britain
- Awards: Distinguished Flying Cross

William Henry Hodgson DFC (30 September 1920 – 13 March 1941) was a New Zealand fighter pilot and flying ace who flew in the Royal Air Force (RAF) during the Second World War. He was officially credited with the destruction of five enemy aircraft.

Born in Frankton Junction, he joined the Royal New Zealand Air Force in May 1939. After completing flight training, he went to the United Kingdom, arriving in April 1940. Shortly afterwards, he transferred to the RAF and was posted to No. 85 Squadron. He flew Hawker Hurricane fighters extensively during the Battle of Britain, shooting down a number of German aircraft. He was taken off flying duties in February 1941 due to a medical issue with his eyes, which had been injured in combat the previous year. He was killed the following month when the Douglas A-20 Havoc, flown by another Battle of Britain flying ace, Geoffrey Allard, on which he was a passenger crashed shortly after takeoff.

== Early life ==
Born on 30 September 1920 in Frankton Junction, a suburb of Hamilton, New Zealand, William Henry Hodgson was one of two sons of Harry and Leonora May Hodgson. His family moved south to Dunedin when Hodgson was young, and he was educated at Macandrew Road School and then went onto King Edward Technical College. After completing his schooling, he worked as a technician at a radio station. He was also an age-group representative for Otago in rugby union. Already a pilot in the civil reserve, in May 1939 he was accepted for a short service commission in the Royal New Zealand Air Force (RNZAF). He underwent flight training at the Otago Aero Club in Dunedin before going on to the RNZAF No. 1 Flight Training School at Wigram, where he flew Avro Tutors, Fairey Gordons and Vickers Vildebeests.

== Second World War ==
The Second World War had broken out by the time Hodgson had gained his wings and he travelled to England aboard the SS Remuera the following March as an acting pilot officer. Shortly after his arrival, having proceeded to Uxbridge for an induction course, he transferred to the Royal Air Force (RAF). After completing his induction, he went to No. 1 Fighter Pilot Unit at RAF Meir and then No. 6 Operational Training Unit at RAF Sutton Bridge for a conversion course on the Hawker Hurricane.

On 25 May 1940, Hodgson was posted to No. 85 Squadron, at the time based at Debden as part of No. 12 Group. The squadron had incurred several casualties during its operations in the Battle of France and Hodgson was one of several replacements. They spent the next month in training, under the supervision of the commander, Squadron Leader Peter Townsend. The squadron soon began carrying out patrols along the east coast and providing cover for convoys, operating from Martlesham Heath for the next two and a half months.

== Battle of Britain ==
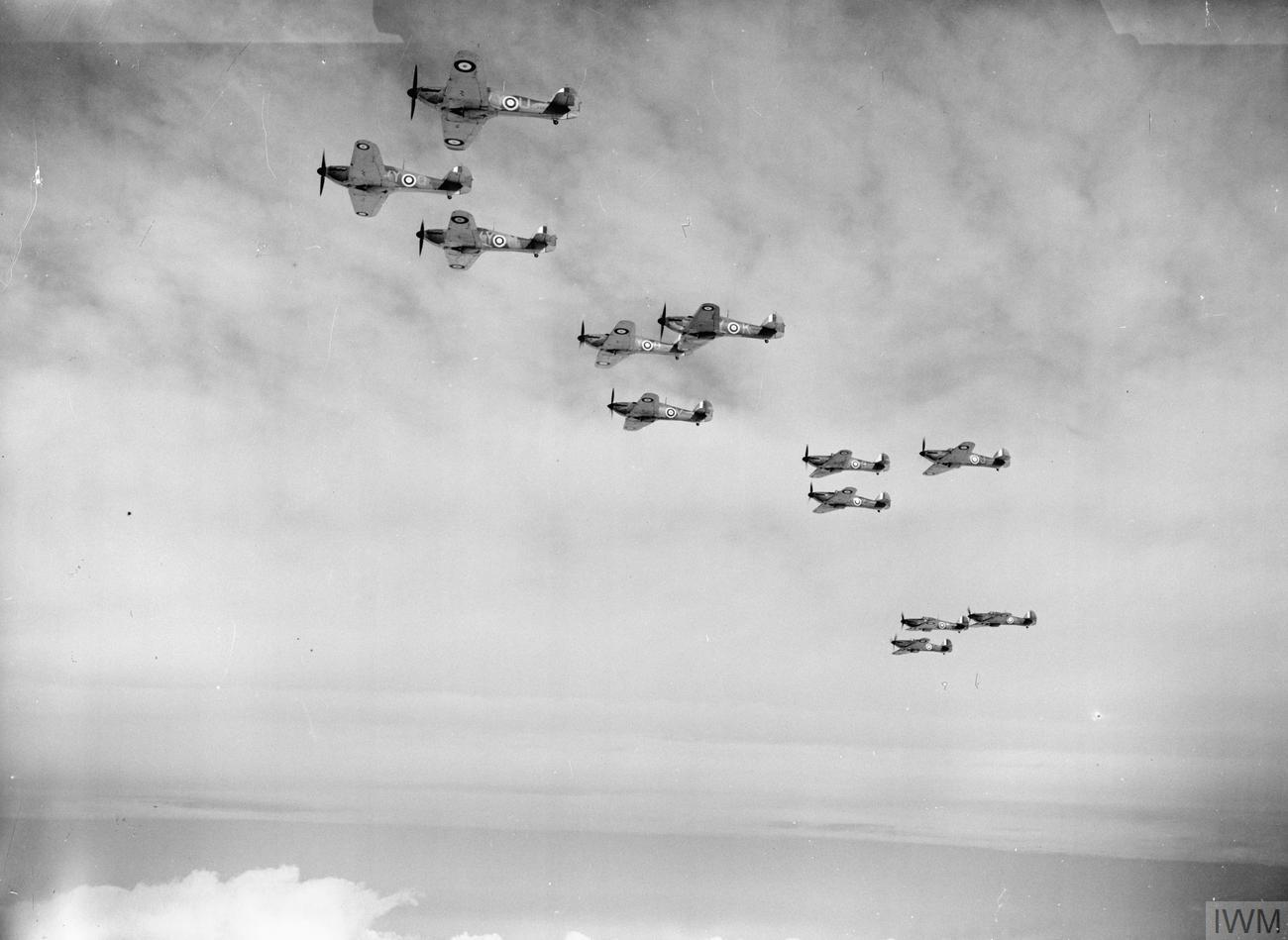
Hurricanes of No. 85 Squadron in flight, October 1940

No. 85 Squadron's involvement in the Battle of Britain began on 18 August when it was ordered to patrol over Canterbury. With three other squadrons it intercepted a large bombing raid mounted by the Luftwaffe, and during the resulting engagement Hodgson shot down a Dornier Do 17 medium bomber and damaged an escorting Messerschmitt Bf 110 heavy fighter. He also claimed a Messerschmitt Bf 109 as a probable. The next day, No. 85 Squadron began operating from the RAF station at Croydon although it did not see any action for a few days because of poor weather. On 26 August, the squadron was on patrol over Maidstone when it intercepted a raid of 15 bombers and 30 escorting fighters. Hodgson engaged and shared in the destruction of two Do 17s. Two days later he was credited with destroying a Bf 109, which he had pursued over the English Channel. The Luftwaffe mounted another large raid on 30 August, with several Heinkel He 111 medium bombers escorted by Bf 109 and Bf 110 fighters seen approaching the English coast. Several of No. 85 Squadron's Hurricanes were scrambled to intercept the raid, which was encountered near Bethenden. In this engagement, Hodgson shot down two of the Bf 110s and probably destroyed another. He also damaged a He 111.

In action again the next day, this time over the Thames Estuary, he damaged a Do 17. It was one of 30 that were engaged by the squadron. An escorting Bf 109 was also shot down by Hodgson, the enemy aircraft crashing near the Thameshaven oil tanks. His own aircraft was damaged in the encounter and was set on fire. He prepared to bail out but decided against it when he realised he was over an urban area. Despite glycol and smoke filling the cockpit, he instead glided the burning Hurricane to a wheels-up landing in a field in Essex, managing to avoid wires and obstacles strung across the field as an anti-invasion measure to deter enemy troop transports from using it as an air strip.

By early September, No. 85 Squadron had been reduced to 11 pilots and it was withdrawn to Church Fenton for a rest. Later in the month Hodgson was awarded the Distinguished Flying Cross. The citation, published the following month in The London Gazette read:

In August, 1940, Pilot Officer Hodgson took part with his squadron in an engagement against more than 250 enemy aircraft, severely damaging several of them. Two days later he operated with his squadron against 150 bombers and fighters and on this occasion destroyed two Messerschmitt 110's, and damaged a Heinkel 111. Later in August, 1940, during an engagement against 30 Dornier 215's, escorted by about 100 enemy fighters, he attacked one of the Dornier 215's head-on, severely damaged it, and then engaged and shot down a Messerschmitt 109. Although Pilot Officer Hodgson's aircraft was hit and set on fire by a cannon shell, he managed to keep the fire under control until he had effected a landing some distance away. By so doing he undoubtedly avoided causing civilian casualties. This officer has exhibited bravery of a high order and a complete disregard of his own personal safety.

— London Gazette, No. 34978, 25 October 1940.

== Night fighting duties ==
No. 85 Squadron began training for night fighting duties in October, in response to the increasing number of bombing raids being mounted at night by the Luftwaffe. It became operational in November, based at Gravesend. The next two months were relatively unsuccessful, with only one bomber shot down at nighttime. However, Hodgson claimed a Bf 109 on 5 December as a probable, when flying on a daytime operation. In February 1941, the squadron returned to Debden and began re-equipping with the Douglas A-20 Havoc. By this time, Hodgson was off flying duties, having been determined to be medically unfit. His eyes had been affected by glycol, most likely from when his aircraft had been damaged the previous August. Later in the month he was invested with his DFC in a ceremony at Buckingham Palace.

== Death ==
On 13 March, Hodgson was a passenger on an A-20 being flown by Flight Lieutenant Geoffrey Allard, another Battle of Britain flying ace. Shortly after takeoff, a panel came loose and wrapped itself around the tail fin of the A-20. Allard lost control and crashed the aircraft, killing all on board. At the time of his death, Hodgson had made 150 operational flights and was credited with destroying five enemy aircraft, and shared in destruction of two more, had three probable enemy aircraft destroyed and two damaged. He is buried at Saffron Walden Cemetery in Essex.

St. Peter's Church in Caversham, Dunedin, depicts Hodgson in one of its stained glass windows as a tribute to him. The window was unveiled in a ceremony in late October 1941. He is also remembered by Hodgson Way near the village of Shotgate, near where he had crashlanded his burning Hurricane on 31 August 1940.
