= A.O.L. Kindersley =

British soldier and diplomat

Archibald Ogilvie Lyttelton Kindersley
- Born: 7 April 1869; Cape Town, Cape Colony
- Died: 19 June 1955 (aged 86); Isle of Wight, Hampshire, England
- Military career
- Allegiance: United Kingdom
- Branch: Highland Light Infantry
- Rank: Lieutenant-Colonel
- Conflicts: Second Boer War; First World War
- Awards: Companion of the Order of St Michael and St George
- Other work: Deputy Lieutenant of Hampshire

Lieutenant-Colonel Archibald Ogilvie Lyttelton Kindersley, CMG, DL (7 April 1869 – 19 June 1955) was a British soldier and diplomat.

== Biography ==
He was the eldest son of Captain H. W. S. Kindersley, of the 29th and 99th Regiments, of Tranmere, Lymington, and was educated at the Edinburgh Academy.

Entering the British Army, Kindersley was promoted to captain on 17 September 1892, and served with the Highland Light Infantry in Niger Coast Protectorate from 1893 to 1896, including the Brass River Expedition of 1895. He was re-commissioned for active service during the Second Boer War, and left Southampton in February 1900 with a battalion of the Scottish Rifles headed for South Africa, where he served as a transport officer. He received the honorary rank of major on 12 April 1902.

Following the end of the war, Kindersley worked as a colonial administrator in South Africa. He was Honorary attaché to the British Embassy in Tokyo from 1911 to 1913. He was recalled to military service in 1914 for World War I, in Salonika Campaign from 1916 to 1919, where he was three times mentioned in dispatches, and awarded the Ordre de l’Etoile noire. He commanded the 1st Garr. Batt. of the Seaforth Highlanders and the 11th (Service) Batt. Cameronians. He was appointed CMG in 1919.

Kindersley was a Deputy Lieutenant of Hampshire and County President of the Isle of Wight Boy Scouts Association. He resided at Hamstead Grange, near Yarmouth, Isle of Wight.

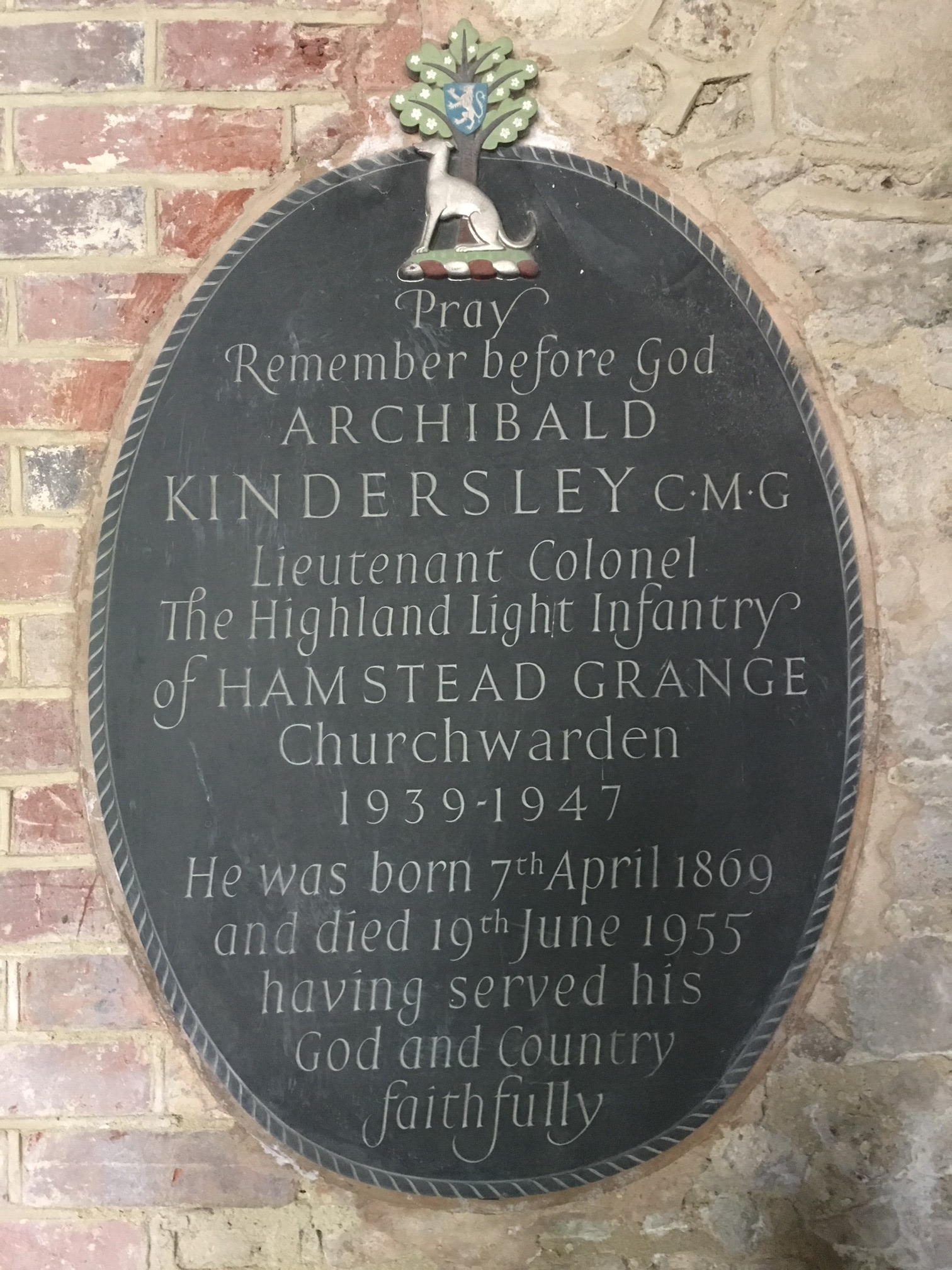
Archibald Kindersley memorial in the Church of St Michael the Archangel, Shalfleet, Isle of Wight

== Family ==
In 1908 Kindersley married Edith daughter of Thomas Craven, JP, of Kirklington Hall, Notts, sometime High Sheriff of Nottinghamshire. They had two sons and a daughter; Claude Richard Henry Kindersley (1911-1993), and Alistair Thomas James Kindersley (died 1941 on active service aged 26). His first wife died in 1936. In 1937 he remarried to the Hon. Emily Seely, eldest daughter of J. E. B. Seely, 1st Baron Mottistone.
