= Charles Darwin (Collier) =

Painting by John Collier

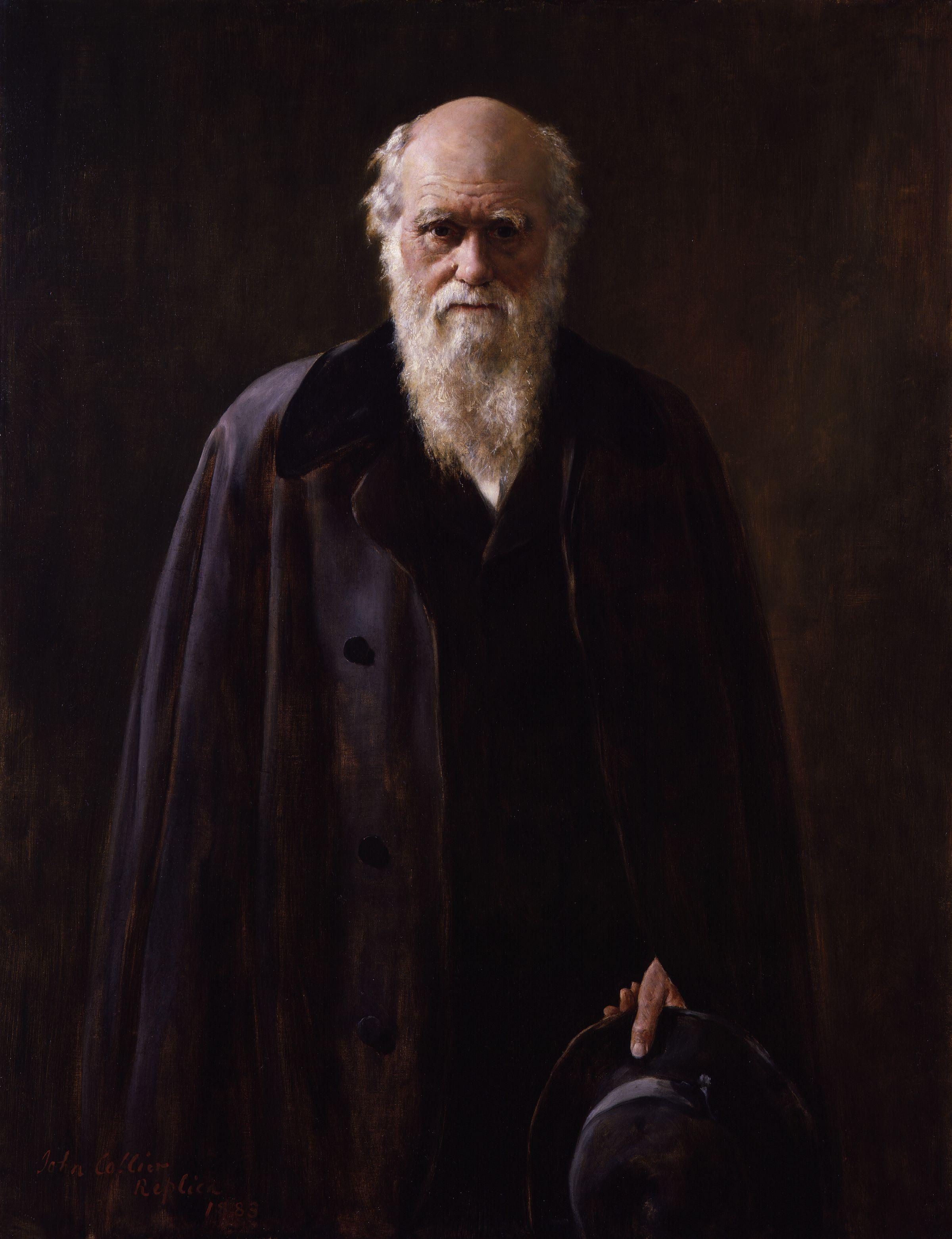
- Artist: John Collier
- Year: 1883
- Medium: Oil on canvas
- Dimensions: 125.7 cm × 96.5 cm (49.5 in × 38.0 in)
- Location: National Portrait Gallery, London

Charles Darwin is the title of two oil on canvas portraits by English painter John Collier. The first is from 1881 and is held at the Linnean Society of London, while the second, and better known version, is from 1883, and is at the National Portrait Gallery, in London.

== History and description ==
The naturalist Charles Darwin was 72 years old when he sat for the original portrait in 1881, the year before his death. The Linnean Society decided to commission a portrait which they believed would be the ultimate likeness of him. He is depicted as a bald and white bearded old man, standing against a dark background, while looking directly at the viewer, dressed in a loose cloak and holding his hat in his left hand. The second version, made two years later, and the year following Darwin's death, was considered an improvement upon the original. People who knew Darwin better were impressed with its resemblance and realism, and many of them believed that this was the best portrait ever made of him. This was also the scientist's own opinion, according to his son, Francis Darwin: "Many of those who knew his face most intimately, think that Mr Collier's picture is the best of the portraits and in this judgement the sitter himself was inclined to agree." Darwin, in fact, stated that "Collier was the most considerate, kind and pleasant painter a sitter could desire." The portrait became very popular and was widely reproduced afterwards.

== Provenance ==
The portrait held at the National Portrait Gallery was offered by William Erasmus Darwin, in 1896, 13 years after the death of Darwin.
