= Sopwith Dolphin =

British WW1 biplane fighter aircraft

5F.1 Dolphin
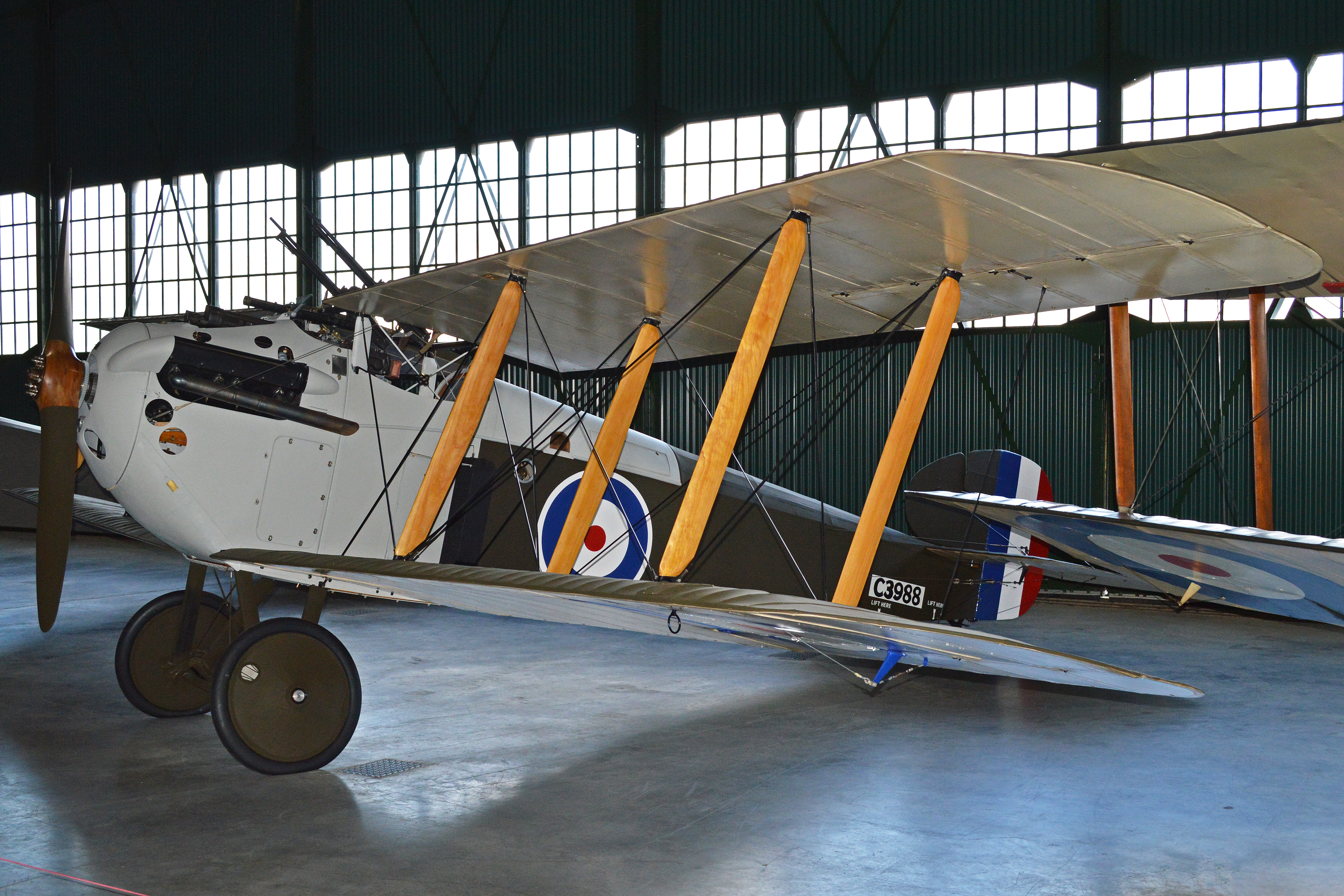
- Dolphin Mk I composite airframe displayed at the Royal Air Force Museum London, 2013

General information
- Type: Fighter
- Manufacturer: Sopwith Aviation Company
- Designer: Herbert Smith
- Primary users: Royal Flying Corps Royal Air Force
- Number built: 2,072

History
- Introduction date: February 1918
- First flight: 23 May 1917

The Sopwith 5F.1 Dolphin was a British fighter aircraft manufactured by the Sopwith Aviation Company. It was used by the Royal Flying Corps and its successor, the Royal Air Force, during the First World War. The Dolphin entered service on the Western Front in early 1918 and proved to be a formidable fighter. The aircraft was not retained in the postwar inventory and was retired shortly after the war.

== Design and development ==
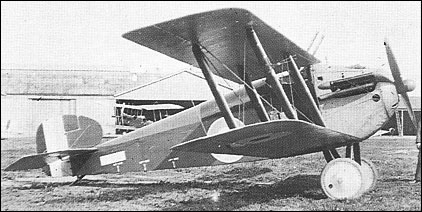
Third prototype at Brooklands Airfield

In early 1917, the Sopwith chief engineer, Herbert Smith, began designing a new fighter (internal Sopwith designation 5F.1) powered by the geared 200 hp (150 kW) Hispano-Suiza 8B. The Dolphin was a two-bay, single-seat biplane, with the upper wings attached to an open steel cabane frame above the cockpit. To maintain the correct centre of gravity, the lower wings were positioned 13 in (330 mm) forward of the upper wings, creating the Dolphin's distinctive negative wing stagger. The pilot sat with his head through the frame, where he had an excellent view. This configuration sometimes caused difficulty for novices, who found it difficult to keep the aircraft pointed at the horizon because the nose was not visible from the cockpit. The cockpit was nevertheless warm and comfortable, in part because water pipes ran alongside the cockpit walls to the two side-mounted radiator blocks. A pair of single-panel shutters, one in front of each radiator core and operated by the pilot, allowed the engine temperature to be controlled.

The first Dolphin prototype was powered by a geared 150 hp (110 kW) Hispano-Suiza 8B-series V-8 engine and featured a deep "car-type" frontal radiator. The test pilot, Harry Hawker, carried out the maiden flight on 23 May 1917. In early June, the prototype was sent to Martlesham Heath for official trials. On 13 June, the prototype flew to Saint-Omer, France, where the aircraft's unfamiliar shape prompted Allied anti-aircraft gunners to fire on it. Several pilots, including Billy Bishop of No. 60 Squadron, evaluated the prototype and reported favourably. On 28 June 1917, the Ministry of Munitions ordered 200 Dolphins from Hooper & Co. Shortly afterwards, the Ministry ordered a further 500 aircraft from Sopwith and 200 aircraft from Darracq Motor Engineering Company.

The second prototype introduced upper wing radiators in lieu of the frontal radiator and large cut-outs in the lower wing roots, to improve the pilot's downward vision. These features proved a failure and were omitted from subsequent aircraft. The third and fourth prototypes incorporated numerous modifications to the radiator, upper fuselage decking, fin and rudder. The fourth prototype was selected as the production standard. Series production commenced in October 1917, with 121 Dolphins delivered by the end of the year.

== Operational history ==
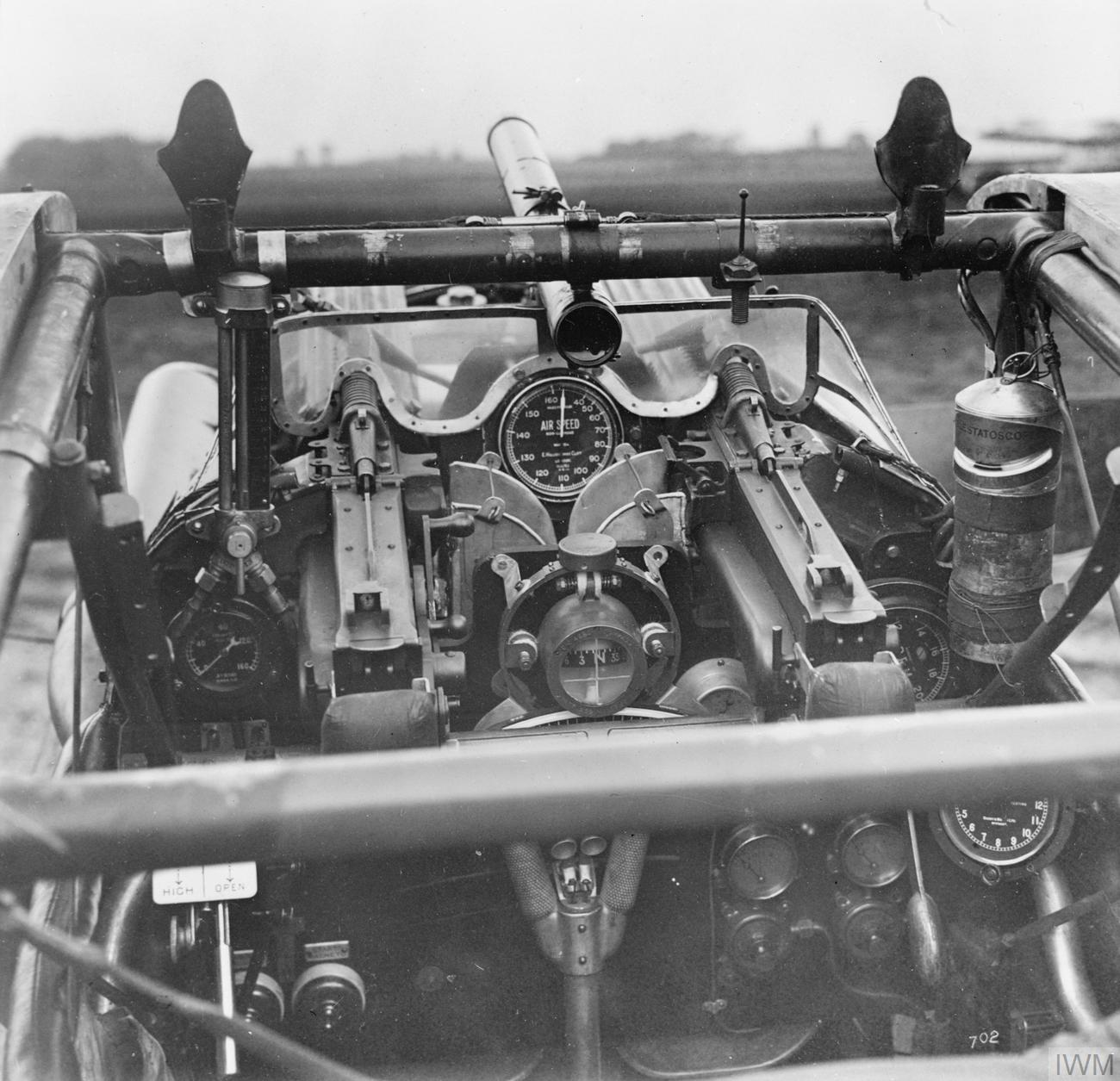
Dolphin cockpit with view of twin Vickers machine guns and Aldis sight

The Dolphin Mk I became operational with 19 Squadron and 79 Squadron in February 1918 and 87 Squadron and 23 Squadron in March. The Dolphin's debut was marred by several incidents in which British and Belgian pilots attacked the new aircraft, mistaking it for a German type. For the next few weeks, Dolphin pilots exercised caution near other Allied aircraft.

New pilots voiced concern over the Dolphin's wing arrangement, fearing serious injury to the head and neck in the event of a crash. Early aircraft were often fitted with improvised crash pylons consisting of steel tubes over the cockpit to protect the pilot's head. Experience showed that fears of pilot injury from overturning were largely unfounded. Crash pylons disappeared from frontline aircraft, though they were often retained on trainers. Night-flying Dolphins of 141 Squadron, a Home Defence unit, had metal loops fitted above the inner set of interplane struts. Despite early problems, the Dolphin proved successful and generally popular with pilots. The aircraft was fast, manoeuvrable and easy to fly, though a sharp stall was noted. In his memoir Sagittarius Rising, Cecil Lewis described a mock dogfight between his S.E.5 and a Dolphin,

The Dolphin had a better performance than I realised. He was up in a climbing turn and on my tail in a flash. I half rolled out of the way, he was still there. I sat in a tight climbing spiral, he sat in a tighter one. I tried to climb above him, he climbed faster. Every dodge I have ever learned I tried on him; but he just sat there on my tail, for all the world as if I had just been towing him behind me.

When working properly, the Dolphin's Hispano-Suiza engine afforded excellent performance at high altitude. The Dolphin was often sent against German reconnaissance aircraft such as the Rumpler C.VII, which in its specialised Rubild photo-reconnaissance version, routinely operated at altitudes above 20,000 ft (6,100 m). No. 87 Squadron explored the use of equipment to supply pilots with oxygen at high altitude but the experiment was abandoned after trials showed that the oxygen tanks exploded when struck by gunfire.

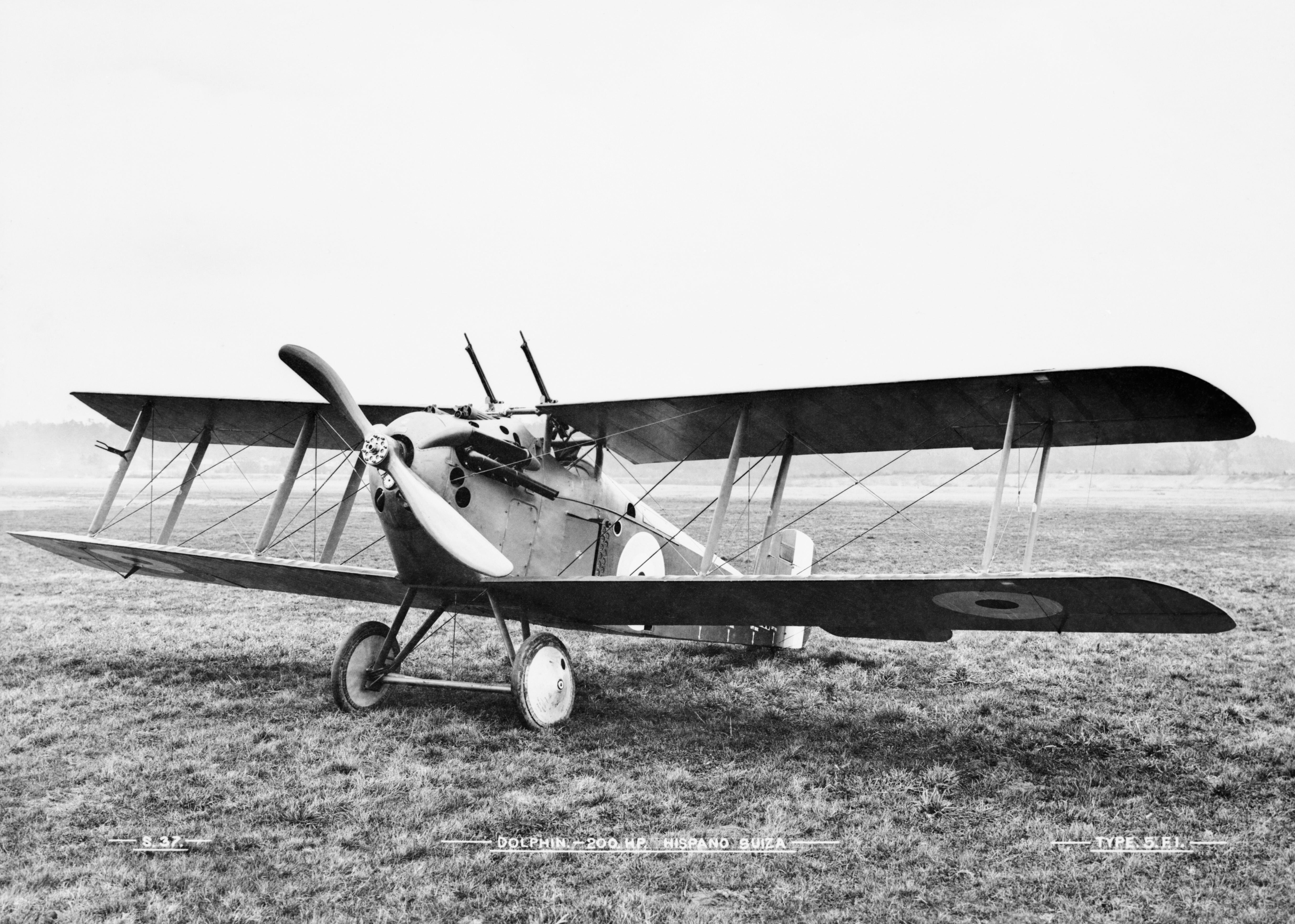
Dolphin fitted with two upward firing Lewis guns and Norman vane sights

Four Royal Air Force squadrons operated the Dolphin as their primary equipment, while other squadrons used it in small numbers. The Canadian 1 (Fighter) Squadron, Canadian Air Force, formed with Dolphins at RAF Upper Heyford. The unit became operational shortly after the Armistice. In October 1918, the American Expeditionary Force purchased five standard Mk Is for evaluation, sending four back to the United States.

The highest-scoring Dolphin unit was 87 Squadron, which shot down 89 enemy aircraft. Pilots of 79 Squadron shot down 64 enemy aircraft in the eight and a half months that the aircraft was at the front. The top two Dolphin aces served in 79 Squadron. Captain Francis W. Gillet, an American, scored 20 victories in the type. Lieutenant Ronald Bannerman, a New Zealander, scored 17 victories. The third-ranking Dolphin ace was Captain Arthur Vigers of 87 Squadron, who attained all 14 of his victories in the same aircraft, serial no. C4159. Another notable ace, Major Albert Desbrisay Carter of 19 Squadron, obtained approximately 13 of his 29 confirmed victories in the Dolphin. Captain Henry Biziou scored eight victories in the type.

=== Engine problems ===
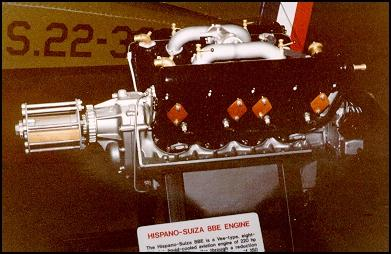
A geared Hispano-Suiza 8Be engine on display at the NMUSAF

The scarcity and unreliability of the French-built Hispano-Suiza 8B engine proved to be the most serious problem of the Dolphin. Use of insufficiently hardened metal in the pinion gears led to numerous failures of the reduction gearing, particularly in engines built by the French firm Brasier. The engine also suffered persistent lubrication problems. Limited production capacity for the geared Hispano-Suiza HS.8B engine and the priority afforded to French aircraft like the SPAD S.XIII slowed Dolphin deliveries. Availability of the Hispano-Suiza improved in early 1918 as the French firm Emile Mayen began deliveries on an order placed by the British Admiralty.

=== Use of the Lewis guns ===
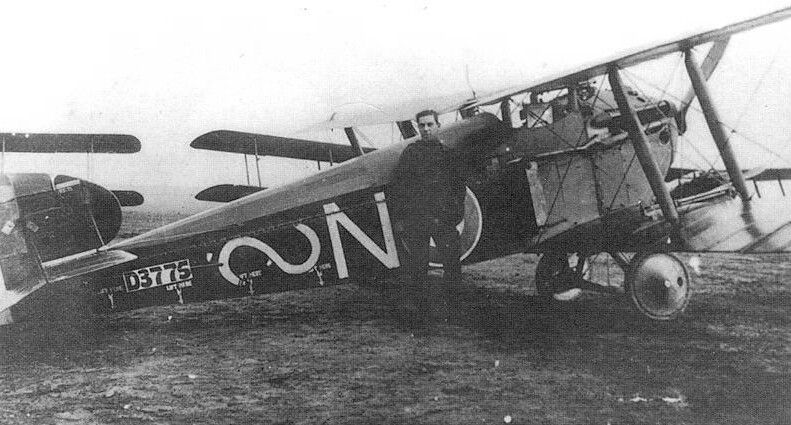
No. 87 Squadron Dolphin flown by Cecil Montgomery-Moore. A Lewis gun is mounted atop the lower right wing

The official armament of the Dolphin was two fixed, synchronised Vickers machine guns and two Lewis guns mounted on the forward cabane crossbar, firing at an upward angle, over the propeller disc. The mounting provided three positions in elevation and some limited sideways movement. The Lewis guns proved unpopular as they were difficult to aim and tended to swing into the pilot's face. Pilots also feared that the gun butts would inflict serious head injuries in the event of a crash. Most pilots discarded the Lewis guns, though a minority retained one or both guns for attacking high altitude reconnaissance aircraft from below.

Pilots of 87 Squadron, including Arthur Vigers, experimentally fitted some aircraft with two forward firing, unsynchronised Lewis guns mounted on top of the lower wing, just inboard of the inner wing struts. These guns could fire incendiary ammunition, which could not be used with the synchronised Vickers guns. The 97-round ammunition drums could not be changed once empty, nor could the pilot clear gun jams and the field modification did not become standard.

=== Postwar service ===
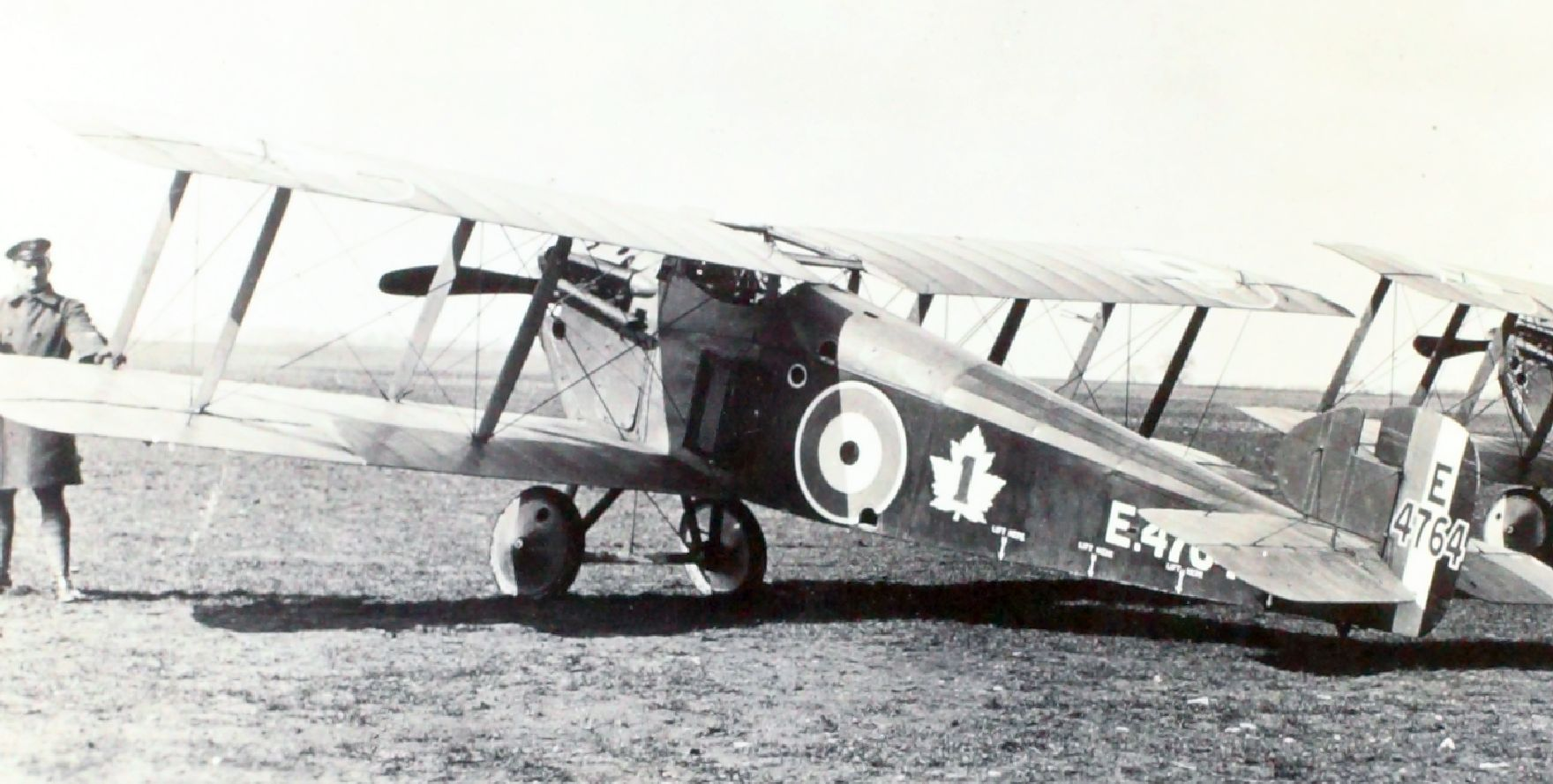
Canadian Air Force Dolphins of No. 1 (Fighter) Squadron at RAF Upper Heyford, December 1918

Dolphins were quickly retired after the war; 19 and 87 Squadrons demobilised in February 1919, followed by 23 Squadron in March. The last RAF unit to operate Dolphins was 79 Squadron, based in Bickendorf, Germany, as part of the British Army of the Rhine; 79 Squadron demobilised in July 1919. The Dolphin was declared obsolete on 1 September 1921. The Canadian 1 (Fighter) Squadron, which operated Dolphins with S.E.5as, Sopwith Snipes and captured Fokker D.VIIs, was disbanded on 28 January 1920. Although retired from Canadian Air Force service, a small number of Dolphins were sent back to Canada.

One Dolphin was converted for civilian use. In 1920, Handley Page obtained serial no. D5369 and operated it as a demonstrator under the civil registration G-EATC. This aircraft was sold in 1923. The Polish Air Force operated 10 Dolphins during the Polish-Soviet War. From August 1920, these aircraft were primarily used for ground attack duties in the Battle of Warsaw and other actions. They were soon grounded due to lack of spare parts. In October 1920, two Polish Dolphins were loaned to the Ukrainian People's Republic Air Fleet for use against the Soviets. Both aircraft were returned to the Poles in February 1921.

== Production and planned developments ==
A total of 2,072 Dolphin Mk I aircraft were produced by Sopwith, the Darracq Motor Engineering Company and Hooper & Co. Approximately 1,500 Dolphins were stored awaiting engines at the time of the Armistice. These incomplete airframes were eventually scrapped.

Two developments of the Dolphin were planned. The French firm SACA (Société Anonyme des Constructions Aéronautiques) commenced licensed production of the Dolphin Mk II in 1918. The RAF expressed no interest in this variant, which was intended for the French Aéronautique Militaire and the US Army Air Service. The Mk II's 300 hp (220 kW) direct-drive Hispano-Suiza 8F gave a maximum speed of 140 mph (225 km/h) and a ceiling of 26,401 ft (8,047 m). The new engine had a displacement of 18.5 L (4.1 imp gal; 4.9 US gal) (1,129 in^{3}) and required an enlarged, bulbous cowling that fully enclosed the guns. The Mk II also featured an additional fuel tank, a variable incidence tailplane, strengthened airframe and longer exhaust pipes. The Air Service anticipated delivery of over 2,000 Mk II aircraft by the summer of 1919 but only a few were delivered before the Armistice.

Persistent difficulties with the geared 200 hp (150 kW) Hispano-Suiza 8B prompted development of the Dolphin Mk III, which used a de-geared version of the engine. The Mk III first flew in October 1918 and went into production just as hostilities ended. Many Dolphins were converted to Mk III standard at aircraft repair depots by removing the reduction gear from the engine and fitting a revised cowling to accommodate the lower thrust line. In service, the Mk III offered slightly lower performance, but improved reliability.

== Variants ==
Dolphin Mk I

Main production version. Powered by a geared 200 hp (149 kW) Hispano-Suiza 8B.

Dolphin Mk II

Manufactured under licence in France. Powered by a direct-drive 300 hp (224 kW) Hispano-Suiza 8F.

Dolphin Mk III

Powered by a 200 hp (149 kW) Hispano-Suiza 8B, modified to remove the reduction gear.

== Operators ==
Canada:

- Canadian Air Force
  - No. 1 (Fighter) Squadron

Second Polish Republic:

- Polish Air Force (postwar, donated by United Kingdom, operated 1920–1923)
  - 19. Eskadra Myśliwska

Ukrainian People's Republic

- Ukrainian People's Republic Air Fleet (postwar, two aircraft loaned by Poland in October 1920, returned to Poland in February 1921)
  - 1. Zaporoska Eskadra Ukraińska

United Kingdom:

- Royal Flying Corps/Royal Air Force
  - No. 19 Squadron
  - No. 23 Squadron
  - No. 56 Squadron (operational trials only)
  - No. 79 Squadron
  - No. 85 Squadron
  - No. 87 Squadron
  - No. 90 Squadron
  - No. 91 Squadron
  - No. 141 Squadron

United States

- American Expeditionary Force
- United States Army Air Service

== Surviving aircraft ==
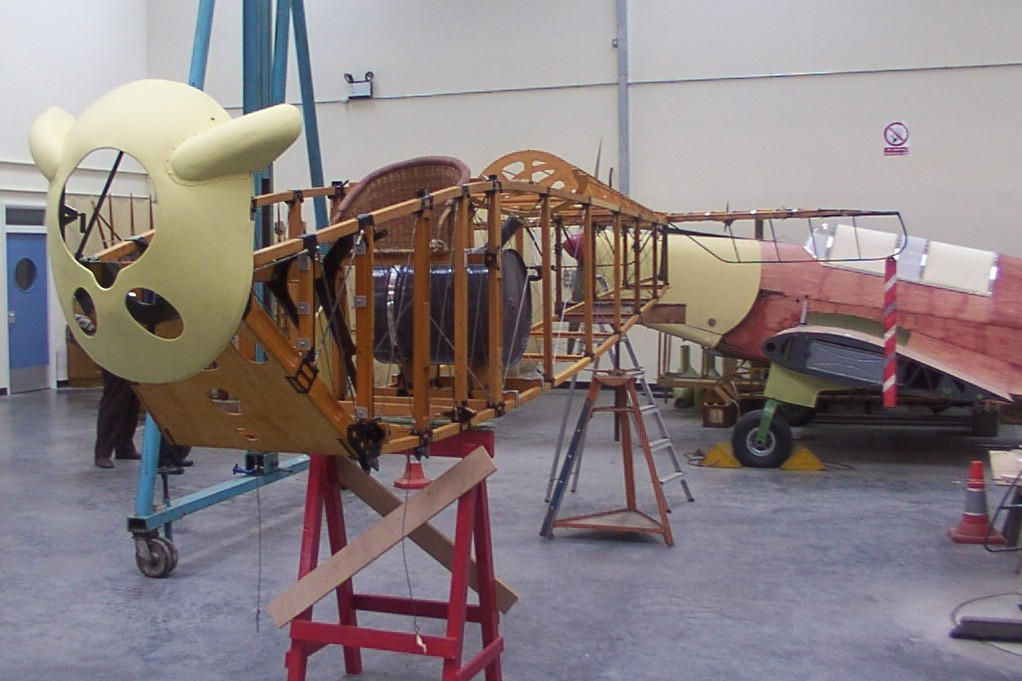
Dolphin Mk I under restoration at the Michael Beetham Conservation Centre, part of the Royal Air Force Museum Cosford

No complete Dolphin is known to have survived to the present, but a composite Dolphin Mk I was rebuilt at the Michael Beetham Conservation Centre, part of the Royal Air Force Museum Cosford. The airframe is based on an original 6 ft (1.8 m) length of rear fuselage from serial no. C3988. It includes many other original parts, including a fuel tank, wheels, radiators, tailplane, and elevators from serial nos. D5329 and C4033. In March 2012, the Dolphin was placed on display at the Royal Air Force Museum London in the Grahame White Hangar.

== Reproduction ==
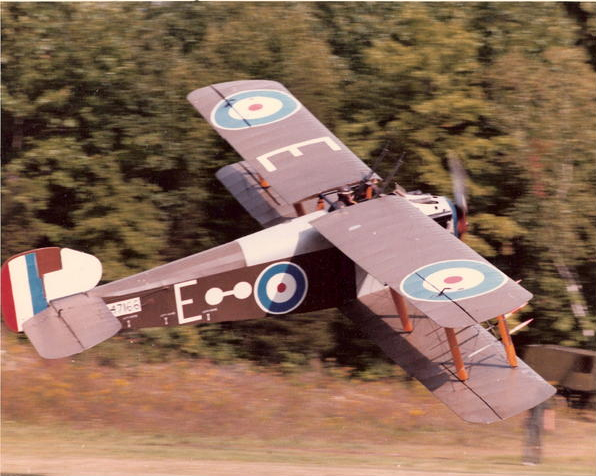
Old Rhinebeck Aerodrome's Sopwith Dolphin reproduction in the early 1980s, using a direct-drive Hispano-Suiza 8 engine

In 1977, Cole Palen built an accurate Dolphin reproduction for his Old Rhinebeck Aerodrome living aviation museum, in the mid-Hudson Valley of eastern New York. It flew regularly at Old Rhinebeck's weekend air shows until September 1990, when it crash-landed after a fuel pump failure. As of 2015, the aircraft was under restoration to flying condition.

== Specifications (Dolphin Mk I) ==
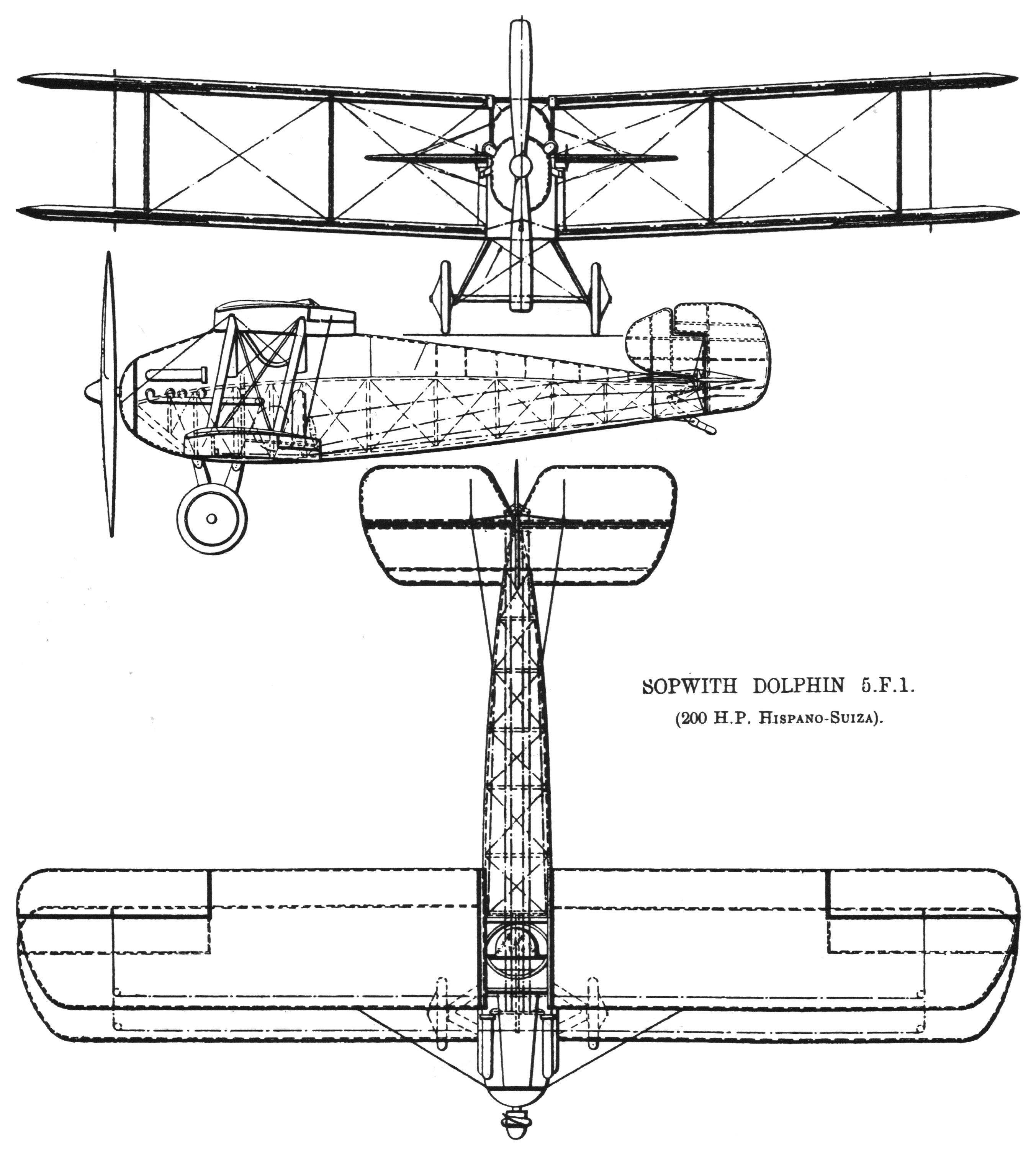
Sopwith 5F.1 Dolphin drawing

Data from Sopwith – The Man and His Aircraft

General characteristics

- Crew: 1
- Length: 22 ft 3 in (6.78 m)
- Wingspan: 32 ft 6 in (9.91 m)
- Height: 8 ft 6 in (2.59 m)
- Wing area: 263 sq ft (24.4 m^{2})
- Empty weight: 1,400 lb (635 kg)
- Max takeoff weight: 1,990 lb (903 kg)
- Powerplant: 1 × Hispano-Suiza 8B V-8 water-cooled geared piston engine, 200 hp (150 kW)
- Propellers: 2-bladed fixed-pitch propeller

Performance

- Maximum speed: 120.5 mph (193.9 km/h, 104.7 kn) at 13,000 ft (4,000 m)

116.5 mph (101.2 kn; 187.5 km/h) at 15,000 ft (4,600 m)

- Endurance: 2 hours
- Service ceiling: 21,000 ft (6,400 m)
- Time to altitude: 10,000 ft (3,000 m) in 16 minutes 30 seconds

Armament

- Guns: 2 × 0.303 in (7.7 mm) Vickers machine guns; up to 2 × 0.303 in (7.7 mm) Lewis guns
- Bombs: Up to four 25 lb bombs.

== See also ==
Aircraft of comparable role, configuration, and era

- Airco DH.5

Related lists

- List of aircraft of the Royal Air Force
