= Charles Waring Darwin (British Army officer) =

British soldier and landowner

Colonel Charles Waring Darwin, CB, DL, JP (28 August 1855 – 1 August 1928) was a British soldier and landowner.

Darwin was the son of Francis Darwin JP DL (né Rhodes) of Elston Hall, Nottinghamshire; his mother Charlotte Maria Cooper Darwin (1827–1885) was the daughter of William Brown Darwin of Elston (1774–1841). He was a second cousin once removed of the naturalist Charles Darwin, their shared ancestors (CWD's great-great-grandparents, CRD's great-grandparents), being Robert Darwin of Elston and his wife Elizabeth (née Hill). His father had changed the family name from Rhodes (of Creskeld Hall) to Darwin (of Elston Hall) in 1850 in order to inherit the latter property from his brother-in-law Robert Alvey Darwin (1826–1847). He was educated at Winchester College.

In 1894 he married Mary Dorothea Wharton, daughter of John Lloyd Wharton MP. They had three sons, each of whom pursued military careers:

- Charles John Wharton Darwin, DSO, Royal Air Force (1894–1941)
- Francis Wharton Darwin, Royal Navy (1896–1972)
- Gilbert William Lloyd Darwin, Royal Air Force (1899–1979)

Darwin entered the British Army in 1873, achieving the rank of lieutenant colonel in the Durham Light Infantry in 1894, before his retirement in 1895. Despite official retirement, he was appointed a major in the 4th (Militia) battalion of his regiment on 15 February 1900, and again saw active service with this battalion in South Africa during the Second Boer War, where he was awarded the service medal with 3 clasps. Following the end of the war, he returned to the United Kingdom with his battalion on the SS Roslin Castle in September 1902, and the battalion was disembodied.

From 1905 to 1912 Darwin was commanding officer of the 3rd (Militia) Battalion of the Durham Light Infantry. He was appointed a deputy lieutenant of Durham on 18 January 1908. From 1908 to 1912 he was chairman of the County Durham Territorial Force Association. He was also a justice of the peace for Durham. In 1911 he was appointed a Companion of the Order of the Bath (CB).

He died in Wiesbaden, Germany in 1928, where forces were stationed as part of the British Army of the Rhine, and his funeral was held there. His estate was valued at £55,983.
