= List of World War II aces credited with 10 victories =

List of world war II victories

Fighter aces in World War II had tremendously varying kill scores, affected as they were by many factors: the pilot's skill level, the performance of the airplane the pilot flew and the planes they flew against, how long they served, their opportunity to meet the enemy in the air (Allied to Axis disproportion), whether they were the formation's leader or a wingman, the standards their air service brought to the awarding of victory credits, et cetera.

== Aces ==
This background, along with the symbol "†", indicates that the pilot was killed in action, missing in action, died of wounds, or was killed in a flying accident during World War II.

Name	Country	Service(s)	Aerial victories	Other aerial victories	Notes
George T. Burgard	United States	American Volunteer Group	10.75		
Frank Q. O'Conner	United States	U.S. Army Air Forces	10.75		
Charles F. Anderson, Jr.	United States	U.S. Army Air Forces	10.5		
Richard Joseph Audet †	Canada	Royal Canadian Air Force	10.5		Ace in a day
Marshall U. Beebe	United States	U.S. Navy	10.5		Ace in a day (18 March 1945)
George F. Ceulleers	United States	U.S. Army Air Forces	10.5		
Jack E. Conger	United States	U.S. Marine Corps	10.5		
George A. Doersch	United States	U.S. Army Air Forces	10.5		(+.5 ground kill)
Niilo Erkinheimo	Finland	Finnish Air Force	10.5		
William J. Hovde	United States	U.S. Army Air Forces	10.5	+1 in Korean War	(+2 ground kills)
Martti Kalima	Finland	Finnish Air Force	10.5		
Kullervo Lahtela	Finland	Finnish Air Force	10.5		
Raymond H. Littge	United States	U.S. Army Air Forces	10.5		(+13 ground kills)
Robert Little †	United States	American Volunteer Group	10.5		
Kai Metsola	Finland	Finnish Air Force	10.5		
John Mitchner	Canada	Royal Canadian Air Force	10.5		
John V. Newkirk †	United States	American Volunteer Group	10.5		
Eino Peltola	Finland	Finnish Air Force	10.5		
Edward Rector	United States	American Volunteer Group; U.S. Army Air Forces	10.5		victories with 2 air forces
Russell E. Reiserer	United States	U.S. Navy	10.5		Ace in a day (19 June 1944)
John A. Storch	United States	U.S. Army Air Forces	10.5		(+1.5 ground kills)
John C. Symmes	United States	U.S. Navy	10.5		
Robert E. Murray	United States	U.S. Navy	10.33		
Ralph E. Elliot	United States	U.S. Navy	10.3		
Fred W. Glover	United States	U.S. Army Air Forces	10.33		(+12.5 ground kills)
Bobby Gibbes	Australia	Royal Australian Air Force	10		(+2 shared)
William D. McGarry	United States	American Volunteer Group	10 1/4		
Stanley W. Vejtasa	United States	U.S. Navy	11		Ace in a day (26 October 1942)
Georgy Zakharov	Soviet Union	Soviet Air Force	10	+6 and 4 shared in Spanish Civil War +3 in Second Sino-Japanese War	Ace in two wars
Hugo Armstrong †	Australia	Royal Australian Air Force	10	(+1 shared victory and 3 probables)	
Robert W Aschenbrenner	United States	U.S. Army Air Forces	10		
Virgil K. Meroney	United States	U.S. Army Air Forces	10		
James Benson	United Kingdom	Royal Air Force	10		
Virgil Brennan †	Australia	Royal Australian Air Force	10		
John Cock	Australia	Royal Air Force	10	(+1 shared)	
Thomas Cooper-Slipper	United Kingdom	Royal Air Force	10		
Garrett P. Hopkins	United States	U.S. Army Air Forces	10		(+6 probables)
Nigel Park †	New Zealand	Royal New Zealand Air Force	10		
Colin Parkinson	Australia	Royal Australian Air Force	10		
John Badger †	United Kingdom	Royal Air Force	10		
Frank B. Baldwin	United States	U.S. Marine Corps	10		
James Bazin	United Kingdom	Royal Air Force	10		
Minden Blake	New Zealand	Royal Air Force	10		(+3 shared)
Wayne K. Blickenstaff	United States	U.S. Army Air Forces	10		Ace in a day (24 March 1945)
Crelin Bodie †	United Kingdom	Royal Air Force	10		
Archie Boyd	United Kingdom	Royal Air Force	10		
Joseph E. Broadhead	United States	U.S. Army Air Forces	10		
Carl A. Brown Jr.	United States	U.S. Navy	10		Ace in a day (24 October 1944)
William Clyde	United Kingdom	Royal Air Force	10		
Thaddeus T. Coleman	United States	U.S. Navy	10		
Walter Engel	Germany	Luftwaffe	10		Night fighter ace
Anthony Eyre	United Kingdom	Royal Air Force	10		
Peter Gardner	United Kingdom	Royal Air Force	10		
Geoffrey Garton	United Kingdom	Royal Air Force	10		
George Genders	United Kingdom	Royal Air Force	10		
William K. Giroux	United States	U.S. Army Air Forces	10		
Walter J. Goehausen, Jr.	United States	U.S. Army Air Forces	10		
George Ernest Goodman †	United Kingdom	Royal Air Force	10		+6 shared
Glyn Griffiths	United Kingdom	Royal Air Force	10		
Ernest A. Harris	United States	U.S. Army Air Forces	10		
Frank Howell	United Kingdom	Royal Air Force	10		
Iro Ilk	Germany	Luftwaffe	10		
Alwin M. Juchheim, Jr.	United States	U.S. Army Air Forces	10		(+6 ground kills)
Veikko Karu	Finland	Finnish Air Force	10		
Robert Kipp	Canada	Royal Canadian Air Force	10		
Mauno Kirjonen	Finland	Finnish Air Force	10		
Ahti Laitinen	Finland	Finnish Air Force	10		
Peter Lefevre †	United Kingdom	Royal Air Force	10		
Edward E. Lines	United States	U.S. Army Air Forces	10		
Herbert H. Long	United States	U.S. Marine Corps	10		
Donald MacDonell	United Kingdom	Royal Air Force	10		
Thomas H. Mann, Jr.	United States	U.S. Marine Corps	10		
Miloslav J. Mansfeld	Czechoslovakia	Royal Air Force	10		(+2 V-1 flying bombs)
Joseph L. Mansker	United States	U.S. Army Air Forces	10		
Harris E. Mitchell	United States	U.S. Navy	10		
Mikko Pasila	Finland	Finnish Air Force	10		
Steve Pisanos	Greece	Royal Air Force; U.S. Army Air Forces	10		
Robert J. Rankin	United States	U.S. Army Air Forces	10		Ace in a day (12 May 1944)
Thomas H. Reidy	United States	U.S. Navy	10		
Andrew J. Reynolds	United States	U.S. Army Air Forces	10		
Paul Richey	United Kingdom	Royal Air Force	10		+1 shared
Robert L. Scott, Jr.	United States	U.S. Army Air Forces	10		
Arthur Singer, Jr.	United States	U.S. Navy	10		
John M. Smith	United States	U.S. Navy	10		
Claudio Solaro	Kingdom of Italy	Regia Aeronautica	10	+1 in Spanish Civil War	
Francis Soper †	United Kingdom	Royal Air Force	10		(+4 shared)
Paul M. Stanch	United States	U.S. Army Air Forces	10		
Robert Spurdle	New Zealand	Royal New Zealand Air Force	10		
Josef Stehlík	Czechoslovakia	Royal Air Force	10		
Friedrich-Wilhelm Strakeljahn †	Germany	Luftwaffe	10		
Elliot Summer	United States	U.S. Army Air Forces	10		
James S. Swope	United States	U.S. Navy	10		
Ennio Tarantola	Kingdom of Italy	Regia Aeronautica	10	+1 in Spanish Civil War	
Hamilton Upton	Canada	Royal Air Force	10	(+1 shared)	
Adriano Visconti	Kingdom of Italy	Regia Aeronautica	10		
James Elmslie Walker †	Canada	Royal Canadian Air Force	10		
Robert V. Westermark	United States	U.S. Army Air Forces	10		
Ion Dobran	Kingdom of Romania	Royal Romanian Air Force	10		
Nicolae Polizu-Micsunesti	Kingdom of Romania	Royal Romanian Air Force	10		
Dumitru Ilie	Kingdom of Romania	Royal Romanian Air Force	10		
