= Geoffrey Garton =

British fighter pilot of WWII

- Born: 3 October 1915; Grantham, Lincolnshire, United Kingdom
- Died: November 1976 (aged 61)
- Military career
- Allegiance: United Kingdom
- Branch: Royal Air Force
- Service years: 1939–1962
- Rank: Wing Commander
- Commands: No. 112 Squadron; No. 232 Squadron; No. 87 Squadron; No. 8 SAAF Wing
- Conflicts: Second World War: Battle of Britain; Western Desert campaign; Italian campaign
- Awards: Distinguished Service Order; Distinguished Flying Cross

Geoffrey Garton DSO, DFC (3 October 1915 – November 1976) was a British flying ace who served with the Royal Air Force (RAF) during the Second World War and the postwar period. He is credited with having shot down at least ten aircraft.

From Grantham, Garton, a member of the Royal Air Force Volunteer Reserve, was called up for service in the RAF on the outbreak of the Second World War. Posted to No. 73 Squadron, he flew Hawker Hurricane fighters in the Battle of France and in the subsequent aerial campaign over southeast England, achieving several aerial victories. He later served in Egypt with the squadron until being rested. After a period of test pilot duties, and still in North Africa, he was assigned to No. 112 Squadron and claimed more aerial victories with this unit, eventually becoming its commander. Rested again, he performed instructing duties before taking command of No. 232 Squadron until he was incapacitated with injuries from a car accident. On recovery, he commanded No. 87 Squadron in Italy before ending the war as wing leader at No. 8 SAAF Wing. Garton remained in the RAF in the postwar period and served with the British Air Forces of Occupation. Retiring from military service in 1962 as a wing commander, he died in 1976.

== Early life ==
Geoffrey William Garton was born on 3 October 1915 in Grantham, Lincolnshire, in the United Kingdom. He was educated at Wiggleston Grammar School in Wigston, to where the family had moved after his birth. In May 1937, he joined the Royal Air Force Volunteer Reserve and commenced training as a pilot. His initial flight instruction was at No. 7 Elementary and Reserve Flying Training School (E&RFTS) at Desford and from there he progressed to No. 8 E&RFTS at Woodley.

== Second World War ==
Called up for service in the Royal Air Force on the outbreak of the Second World War, Garton was sent to No. 6 Flying Training School at Little Rissington, and by the end of the year was at No. 11 Group Fighting School at St Athan where he was converted to the Hawker Hurricane fighter. In January 1940, he was posted to No. 43 Squadron as a sergeant pilot. Based at Acklington and operating Hurricanes, the squadron moved north to Wick in February to form part of the aerial defences for the Royal Navy base at Scapa Flow.

=== Battle of France ===
Garton was transferred to No. 73 Squadron, based in France, as a reinforcement pilot for the unit, which was heavily engaged in the aerial campaign in France following the 10 May invasion of the country. On 24 May Garton destroyed a Messerschmitt Bf 110 heavy fighter near Cambrai. As the campaign progressed, the squadron withdrew into the south west of France and it was withdrawn to the United Kingdom in mid-June.

=== Battle of Britain ===
After a period of rebuilding at Church Fenton, No. 73 Squadron returned to operational flying as a night fighter unit in July. On 7 September Garton probably destroyed a Heinkel He 111 medium bomber near Dover. Just over a week later on 15 September, now known as Battle of Britain Day, the squadron was scrambled to intercept a large incoming Luftwaffe raid. In the resulting engagement, Garton made a frontal attack on a Dornier Do 17 medium bomber, damaging it in the vicinity of Maidstone. The damaged Do 17 was subsequently shot down by an anti-aircraft battery at Chatham.

Later in the month, the squadron relocated to Castle Camps from where it operated as part of the night defences of London. On 27 September, Garton shot down a Bf 110. The squadron soon began preparing for a move overseas to the Middle East and departed the United Kingdom in mid-November.

=== North Africa ===
Transported to Sekondi-Takoradi in West Africa aboard the aircraft carrier HMS Furious, No. 73 Squadron's pilots made a cross-country flight with their Hurricanes to Egypt at the end of November. Garton was briefly attached to No. 274 while his own unit prepared to become operational, which it did in January 1941. It began to carry out patrol duties over Bardia and from March, it was based in Tobruk and became engaged in the aerial defence of the city. On 5 April he destroyed a Junkers Ju 87 dive bomber to the south of Marawa. Another Ju 87 was shot down by Garton to the north of Tobruk on 21 April and this was followed a few days later by the destruction of a Henschel Hs 126 reconnaissance aircraft; this was shared with two other pilots. By the end of the month, having flown over 150 operational sorties he has been posted away for a rest. Commissioned a pilot officer, he served as a ferry pilot at Abu Suweir before, in August, being posted to No. 104 Maintenance Unit (MU) as a test pilot. He subsequently performed similar functions at Nos. 107 and 108 MUs, also in Egypt.

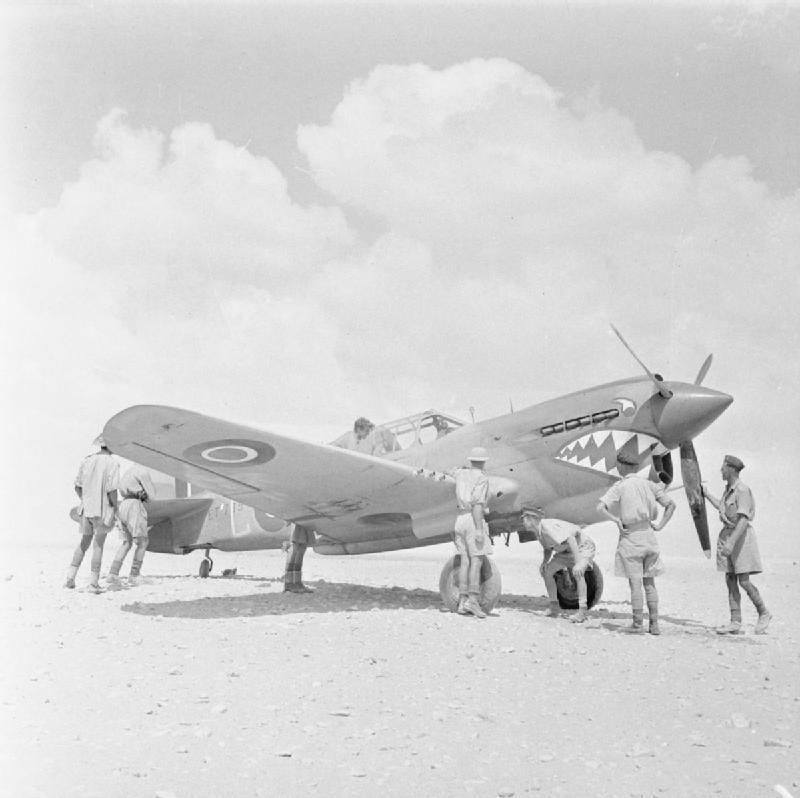
A Curtis Kittyhawk of No. 112 Squadron at El Daba, in Egypt

In late April 1942, and now holding the rank of flying officer, Garton was posted to No. 250 Squadron at Gambut. This operated Curtis Kittyhawk fighters, carrying out ground support operations and escorting bombers. On 17 June Garton shot down a Messerschmitt Bf 109 fighter over Gazala. Initially claimed by him as a probable, it was subsequently confirmed as destroyed. A few days later, Garton was promoted to acting flight lieutenant and assigned to No. 112 Squadron to command one of its flights. The squadron, based at El Daba, was heavily engaged in the aerial fighting over El Alamein and operated from landing grounds in the area. On one occasion, a landing ground had to be abandoned in the face of a German advance; Garton was involved in the successful salvage of a British bomber to prevent it falling into German hands. His effort was recognised with an award of the Distinguished Flying Cross. The citation, published in the London Gazette, read:

In June, 1942, when it became necessary to retire from a landing ground, Flight Lieutenant Garton displayed considerable skill and initiative in salvaging a bomber which had been stripped of much of its equipment. Without having flown this type of aircraft previously he successfully flew the bomber, with two passengers, to another aerodrome where he made a safe landing. Flight Lieutenant Garton has participated in many operational sorties in which he has destroyed at least 4 hostile aircraft.

— London Gazette, No. 35646, 28 July 1942

On 20 July Garton damaged a Macchi C.202 fighter and then, two days later, was shot down, without injury, by anti-aircraft fire. He destroyed another MC.202 on 16 September although initially only claimed it as a probable; it was confirmed as being destroyed the next day. He shared in the destruction of a Ju 87 on 1 October, claiming a second as probably destroyed. Another Ju 87 was shot down by Garton on 1 November, and then on 11 November he destroyed a Junkers Ju 52 transport aircraft. A week later he was posted to the headquarters of No. 239 Wing as an acting squadron leader.

=== Squadron command ===
In mid-January 1943 Garton returned to No. 112 Squadron as its commander. By this time the squadron was stationed at Hamraiet and operating in support of the Allied advance in Libya and onto Tunisia. On 20 April Garton shared in the shooting down of a Junkers Ju 88 medium bomber, his final aerial victory. The next month he was posted away, to No. 73 OTU at Abu Sueir as chief flying instructor. At the start of January 1944, he was appointed commander of No. 232 Squadron. This was based in Syria and equipped with Supermarine Spitfire fighters. The squadron relocated to Italy in April but Garton was injured in a car accident and had to relinquish command at that time due to be hospitalised for several weeks.

=== Later war service ===
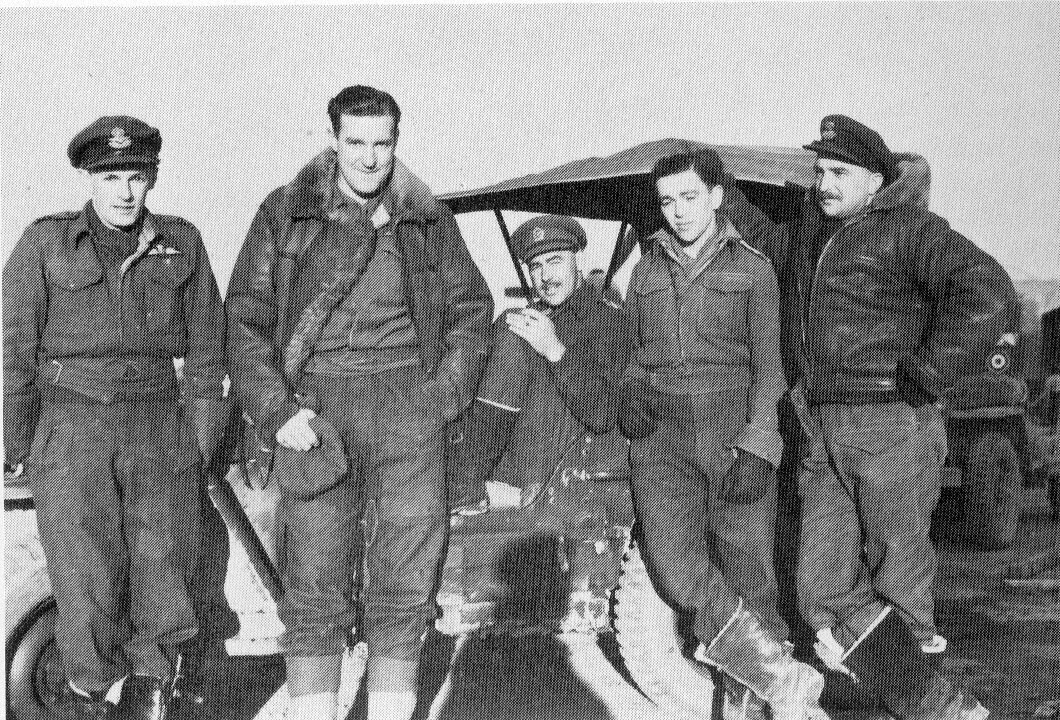
Garton stands on the right in this group of No. 8 SAAF Wing squadron leaders, 1945

Garton's injuries meant that he did not return to operational duties until August, when he was given command of No. 87 Squadron. This was acting in a fighter bomber role with its Spitfires, flying from Perugia, and then Loretto, as part of No. 8 SAAF Wing. Although its operations were curtailed over the winter months, in early 1945 it escorted transport aircraft and commenced ground support operations in aid of the advance of the US Fifth Army. In April, Garton, promoted to acting wing commander, became wing leader of No. 8 SAAF Wing. At the end of the war in Europe, he reverted to command of No. 87 Squadron until he returned to the United Kingdom on leave in June.

Garton was awarded the Distinguished Service Order in August 1945. He ended the war credited with the destruction of ten aircraft, three of which shared with other pilots, and two damaged. He is also believed to have probably destroyed two aircraft.

== Postwar period ==
Garton remained in the RAF in the postwar period, having his service commitment as a squadron leader extended by four years. He served at the headquarters of No. 72 Wing at the British Air Forces of Occupation for a time, and then commanded a wing at No. 5 School of Target Towing. In March 1947, he was appointed commander of No. 2 Aircraft Repair Unit in Eindhoven. He was granted a permanent commission in the RAF's General Duties Branch in July 1948.

In September 1950 Garton was appointed as a flying instructor at Little Rissington, and subsequently served at Cottesmore and then Tern Hill. He was promoted to wing commander in January 1953. Garton was transferred to the RAF's Air Control Branch in July 1954, dropping in rank to squadron leader to do so. He retired from the RAF in February 1962 as a wing commander. Garton died in November 1976.
