= Cecil King =

Cecil King may refer to:

- Cecil Frederick King (1899–1919), World War I flying ace
- Cecil Harmsworth King (1901–1987), chairman of Mirror Group Newspapers, and later a director at the Bank of England
- Cecil King (British painter) (1881–1942), British painter
- Cecil King (Irish painter) (1921–1986), Irish abstract-minimalist painter
- Cecil King (rugby league), rugby league footballer of the 1910s for New Zealand, Wellington, and Taranaki
- Cecil R. King (1898–1974), congressman from California
