= 11 Squadron SAAF =

11 Squadron
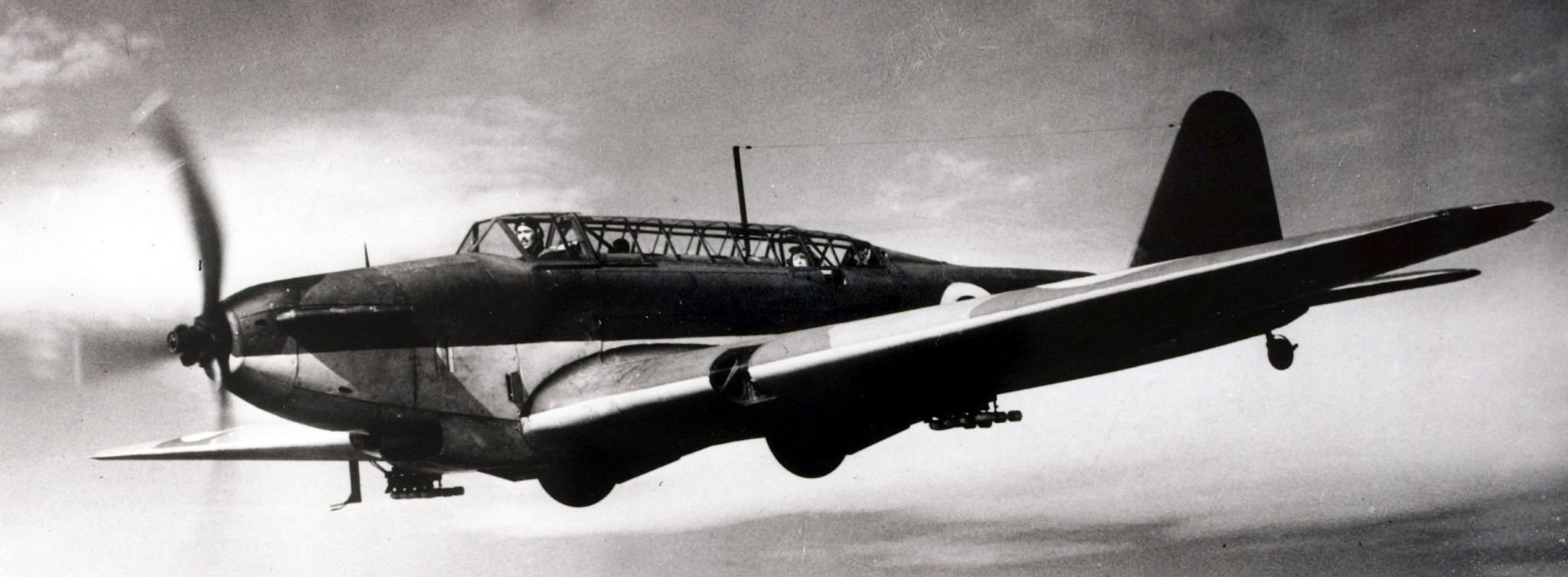
- Fairey Battle similar to that flown by the squadron in East Africa in 1941
- Active: 11 December 1939 – June 1941; 2 June 1944 – August 1945; January 1974 – 1991
- Country: (South Africa)
- Branch: South African Air Force
- Role: Light Bomber and Fighter Bomber (WWII); Liaison 1974–1991
- Garrison/HQ: AFB Potchefstoom when disbanded
- Motto: Ne Desit Virtus (Let Courage not Fail)

Insignia
- Squadron Identification Code: ND 1939–1945
- Insignia

11 Squadron was a World War II squadron of the South African Air Force. It was created in South Africa in 1939 and served in East Africa until 1941 as an army cooperation and reconnaissance squadron. It was re-formed in 1944 as a fighter bomber squadron and served in Italy until 1945 when it returned to Egypt and was disbanded on conclusion of the war on 30 October 1945. It was re-activated in 1974, flying Cessna 185s as an army liaison squadron until 1991 when it disbanded for the final time.

== History ==
11 Squadron served in two periods during World War II, in East Africa and again later in Egypt and Italy. It was formed on 11 December 1939 at Waterkloof Flying Station equipped with 24 Hawker Hartbees in an army co-operation role, moving to Kenya in May 1940. (Note: The squadron flew from Waterkloof on 19 May to Pietersburg and then Bulawayo, 20 May Bulawayo – Salisbury – Broken Hill; 21 May Broken Hill – Mpika; 22 May Mpika – Mbeya – Dodoma – Moshi and on 23 May Moshi – Nairobi.) The squadron received its first Fairey Battle in June 1940 and by 19 August all of the Hartbees aircraft had been replaced by Fairey Battles deployed from Archers Post in Kenya. (Note: The Hawker Hartbees were passed on to 40 Sqn SAAF.) It served in a reconnaissance and army cooperation role in Italian Somaliland and Ethiopia until June 1941 when its aircraft were transferred to 15 Squadron and 11 Squadron was disbanded.

The squadron was re-formed on 29 June 1944 at Almaza in Egypt flying Mk.VB and Mk.VC Spitfires in the role of fighter squadron. It was moved to Edku in July 1944 and to Perugia in Italy in September 1944 – where it exchanged the Spitfires for Curtiss Kittyhawk Mk.IVs as part of the Desert Air Force. In Italy, the squadron was part of No.8 (S.A.A.F.) Wing responsible for ground-attack and fighter-bomber sweeps in support of the armies in Italy until the end of the war.

In August 1945 the squadron received Spitfire Mk.IXs and was transferred back to Egypt, where it remained until being disbanded on 30 October 1945.

It was resurrected in January 1974 as a liaison and army cooperation squadron equipped with Cessna 185s and based at Potchefstroom Air Base. It was finally disbanded in 1991.

== Aircraft ==
Aircraft flown by 11 Squadron
Aircraft	Period	Image
Hawker Hartbee	1939–1940	RAF Hawker Hart
Supermarine Spitfire Mk.VB	1944	40 Sqn SAAF, Gabes 1943
Supermarine Spitfire Mk.Vc	1944	Spitfire Mk. Vc of 1 Squadron SAAF, 1943
Curtiss Kittyhawk	1944–1945	Kittyhawk of No. 5 Squadron SAAF
Supermarine Spitfire Mk.IX	1945	aircraft
Cessna 185	1974–1991	SAAF

=== Notes and references ===
Footnotes

Citations
