= No. 185 Squadron RAF =

Defunct flying squadron of the Royal Air Force

- Active: 21 October 1918 – 14 April 1919; 1 March 1938 – 17 May 1940; 12 May 1941 – 14 August 1945; 15 September 1951 – 1 May 1953
- Country: United Kingdom
- Branch: Royal Air Force
- Mottos: Maltese: Ara fejn hu ("Look where it is")

Insignia
- Badge: A griffin in front of a Maltese Cross.
- Squadron Codes: ZM (Apr 1939 - Sep 1939); GL (Sep 1939 - Apr 1940, May 1942 - Aug 1945)

No. 185 Squadron RAF was a Royal Air Force Squadron formed in World War I and reformed as a bomber and fighter unit in World War II. It then reformed in Malta in the post war period as a jet fighter squadron.

== History ==
=== Formation and World War I ===
No. 185 Squadron was formed in East Fortune, East Lothian, Scotland on 21 August 1918 and was equipped with Sopwith Cuckoo torpedo-bomber aircraft. It did not become operational and disbanded on 14 April 1919.

=== Reformation in World War II ===
The squadron was reformed at RAF Abingdon on 1 June 1938. Two days later six Hawker Hind aircraft were transferred from 40 (Bomber) Squadron and from the 21 June these were gradually replaced with Fairey Battles before moving to RAF Thornaby on 1 September 1938. On 2 June 1939 the squadron were re-equipped with Handley Page Hampden Mk.1s before moving from RAF Thornaby to RAF Cottesmore on 24 August 1939 where it continued as a bomber squadron equipped with 15 Hampdens, a Handley Page Hereford and 4 Avro Ansons. The squadron was absorbed into an OTU on 8 April 1940 before re-forming in Malta on 12 May 1941 as a fighter squadron. The squadron formed for a third time on 27 April 1941 on Malta, from "C" Flight of No. 251 Squadron RAF. The new unit operated the Hawker Hurricane for nearly a year, before the first Spitfires arrived early in 1942. The squadron took part in the fierce air battles that raged over Malta, suffering increasingly heavy losses late in 1942 when the Bf 109F arrived on Sicily, outclassing the Hurricane.

The arrival of the Spitfires restored the balance, and by the end of 1942 No.185 Squadron had gone onto the offensive, flying sweeps over Sicily, and then in July 1943 helping to support the Allied invasion of Sicily.

In July 1944 the squadron became one of two RAF Squadrons to join SAAF (South African Air Force) No 8 Wing (the other being RAF 87 Squadron). In February 1944 the first part of the squadron moved to Italy, operating from Grottaglie (in the Taranto area), and in August 1944 the entire squadron came back together at Perugia. For the rest of the war it operated as a fighter-bomber unit, supporting the Allied advance up the length of Italy. It disbanded on 14 August 1945.

Locations as part of the Italian campaign with SAAF 8 Wing:

21 February-2 August 1944: Detachment to Grottaglie (Italy)

3-23 August 1944: Perugia

23 August-4 September 1944: Loreto

4-17 September 1944: Fano

17 September-7 October 1944: Borghetto

7 October-17 November 1944: Fano

17 November 1944-1 January 1945: Peretola

1 January-30 April 1945: Pontedera

30 April-16 May 1945: Villafranca

16 May-19 August 1945: Campoformido

=== Postwar period ===
The squadron reformed on 15 September 1951 at Hal Far, Malta and was equipped with Vampires. It moved to Iraq in October 1952 and it finally disbanded there on 1 May 1953.

== Aircraft operated ==
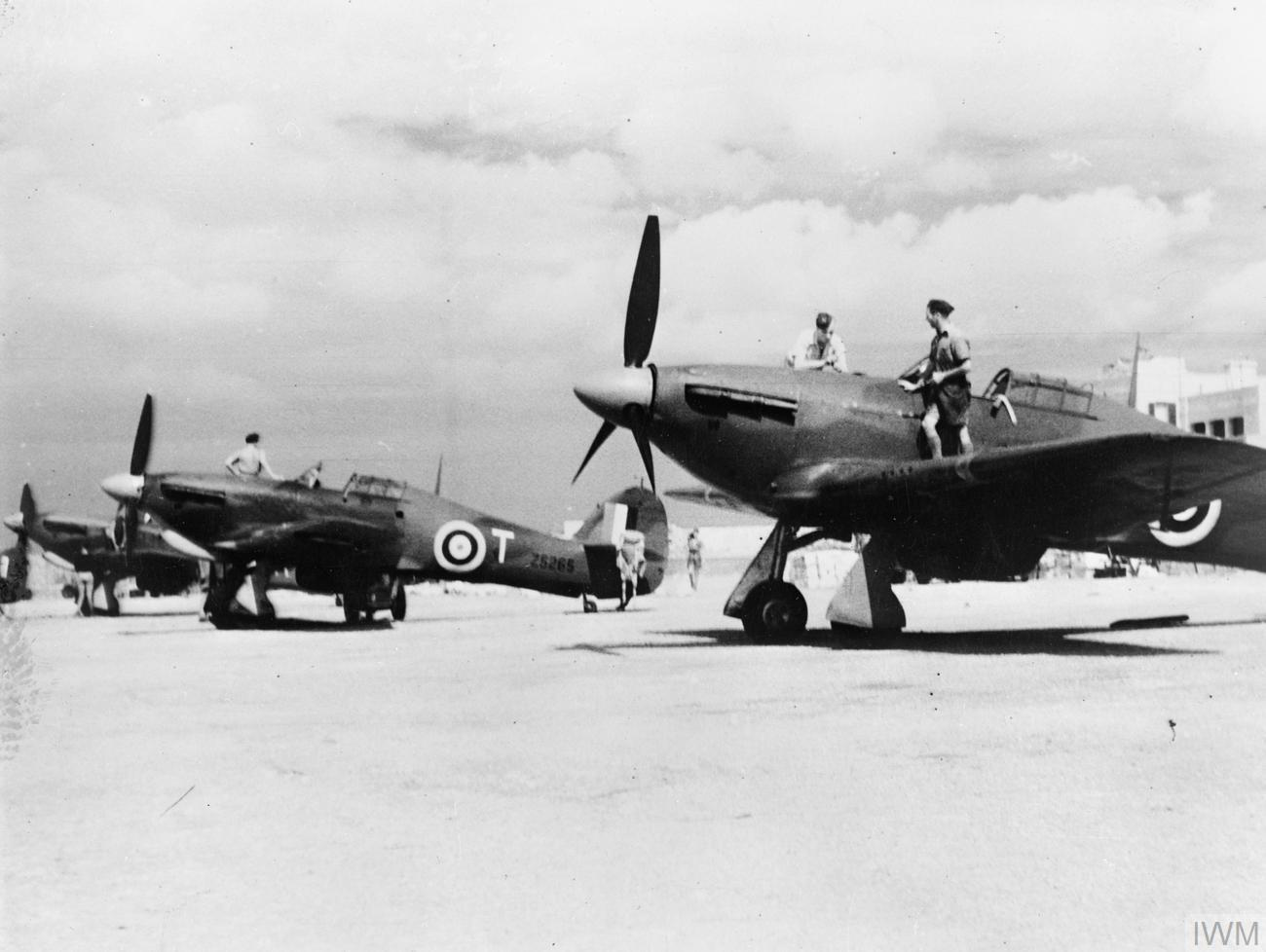
185 Sqn Hurricane IIs at RAF Hal Far, in September 1941.

Aircraft operated by no. 185 Squadron RAF
| From | To | Aircraft | Variant |
|---|---|---|---|
| Nov 1918 | Apr 1919 | Sopwith Cuckoo | |
| Mar 1938 | Jul 1938 | Hawker Hind | |
| Jun 1938 | Jun 1939 | Fairey Battle | |
| Jun 1939 | Apr 1940 | Handley Page Hampden | |
| Aug 1939 | Apr 1940 | Handley Page Hereford | |
| Aug 1939 | Apr 1940 | Avro Anson | I |
| Apr 1940 | May 1940 | Handley Page Hampden | |
| May 1941 | Jun 1942 | Hawker Hurricane | I |
| May 1941 | Jun 1942 | Hawker Hurricane | IIA & IIC |
| May 1942 | Sep 1944 | Supermarine Spitfire | VC |
| Jun 1943 | Jul 1944 | Supermarine Spitfire | IX |
| Aug 1944 | Sep 1944 | Supermarine Spitfire | VIII |
| Sep 1944 | Aug 1945 | Supermarine Spitfire | IX |
| Mar 1945 | Apr 1945 | Supermarine Spitfire | VIII |
| Sep 1951 | May 1953 | de Havilland Vampire | FB.5 |
