= Geoffrey Bailey =

Geoffrey Grierson Bailey
- Born: 10 March 1899
- Died: After 1929
- Military career
- Allegiance: United Kingdom
- Branch: Royal Flying Corps; Royal Air Force
- Rank: Lieutenant
- Nicknames: "Buster", "Lumpy"
- Unit: No. 43 Squadron RAF
- Awards: Distinguished Flying Cross

Lieutenant Geoffrey Grierson Bailey DFC was an English World War I flying ace credited with eight aerial victories. Although well connected in English society of the time, he faded into obscurity post-war.

== Early life ==
Geoffrey Gierson Bailey was born on 10 March 1899. He was the youngest of the three sons born to Norman Coles Bailey, solicitor, who was a partner in the family's law firm in London. The younger Bailey, then nicknamed "Buster", began attending Westminster School on 26 September 1912, according to the school's records. In April 1917, he quit to join the Royal Flying Corps, enlisting on 2 May 1917.

== World War I ==
Tracing Geoffrey Grierson Bailey through official papers can be confusing; sometimes mentioned as G. G. Bailey, he was also occasionally mistakenly gazetted as G. C. Bailey throughout war, until a notice of correction was made postwar on 21 November 1919.

However, it is known that after training as a scout pilot, Bailey was assigned to 43 Squadron to fly a Sopwith Camel on the Western Front in France. He posted his first aerial victory on 16 February 1918, and became an ace with his fifth on 9 May 1918. By the time he scored his eighth win against opposing German fighters, his tally included an Albatros D.III set afire in midair, three Albatros D.Vs destroyed, and three Albatros D.Vs and a Fokker D.VII driven down out of control.

His combat performance was rewarded by the award of the Distinguished Flying Cross on 2 July 1918, gazetted 3 August 1918.

On 6 December 1918 he was confirmed as in the rank of lieutenant.

== Post World War I ==
On 23 September 1919, Geoffrey Bailey, by now nicknamed "Lumpy", ended his military service when he was transferred to the unemployed list of the Royal Air Force.

He was reputed to have emigrated to South Africa circa 1929. After that, nothing is known.
