= 3 Squadron SAAF =

Squadron of the South African Air Force

3 Squadron
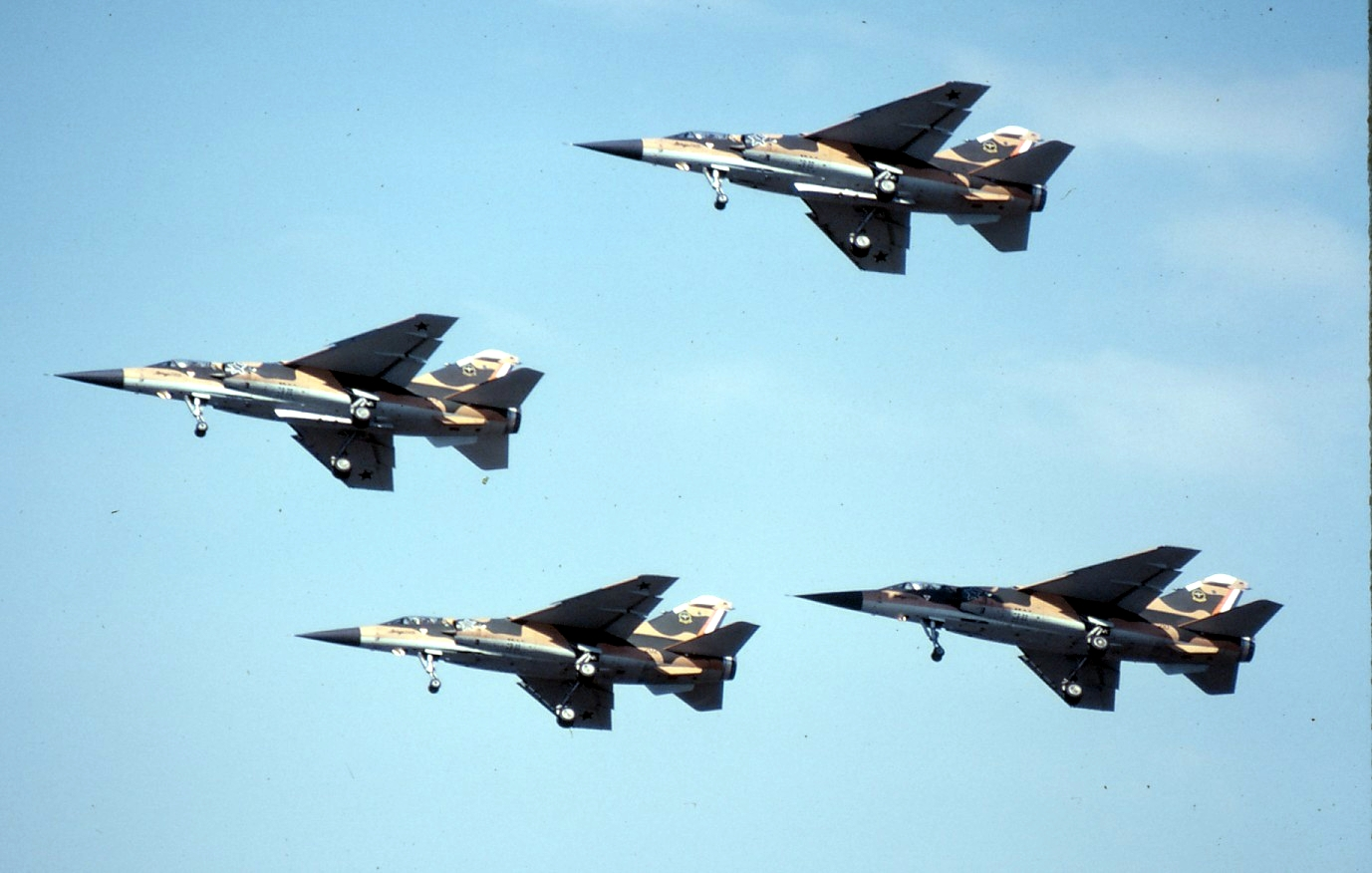
- Mirage F1CZs in formation
- Active: 1940 to 30 September 1992
- Country: South Africa
- Allegiance: South Africa
- Branch: South African Air Force
- Role: Fighter Sqn
- Garrison/HQ: AFB Waterkloof
- Nickname: Fighting Wasps
- Motto: Semper Pugnans (Always Fighting)
- Equipment: Mirage F1CZ
- Engagements: South African Border War

Commanders
- Ceremonial chief: Pik Botha
- Last Officer Commanding: Cmdt W.J Hartogh

Insignia
- Squadron Identification Code: CA (1939–1945) (Squadron OC: Maj C.A. Golding flew with personal identification code CAG in 1944-1945)
- Squadron Crest

3 Squadron SAAF was a squadron of the South African Air Force. It was formed in January 1939 at Air Force Base Waterkloof and was equipped with Hawker Hartbees I and Hurricane Mk II aircraft. The squadron was moved to Port Elizabeth in September 1939 after which it was disbanded. It was again reformed at Waterkloof on 9 September 1940 equipped with Hurricane Mk 1s.

== History ==
The squadron was involved in fighting in East Africa flying Hurricanes and Gladiator Mk IIs, In December 1942 the squadron was sent to the Middle East and flew fighter defence over the port of Aden with Hurricane Mk IIc and Spitfire V aircraft, coastal patrols were also flown from North Africa. In August 1944, 3 Squadron was sent to Italy top join No. 8 Wing SAAF and was re-equipped with Spitfire IXs. The squadron was disbanded following the end of the Second World War.

Three Squadron was again reformed at Baragwanath Airport on 6 September 1952 as a part-time citizen force unit flying Harvards, but disbanded once again in 1957. In August 1966 the squadron was reformed at AFB Waterkloof as a unit under the control of 2 Squadron, equipped with Mirage IIIEZs.

In February 1970 the unit received squadron colours and in the same year, was supplied with Mirage IIIDZ's and Mirage F1CZ's in April 1975 when its Mirage IIIEZ, DZ and D2Z aircraft were transferred to 85 Advanced Flying School. The squadron continued to operate the Mirage F1CZ from Waterkloof AFB with frequent deployments to South-West Africa during the Namibian War of Independence. Three Squadron was disbanded when the Mirage F1CZs were retired on 30 September 1992.

== World War II deployment ==
- January – December 1941: Fighter squadron, East Africa
- 1942: South Africa
- January 1943 – August 1944: Shipping patrols, North Africa
- August 1944 – September 1945: Ground attack, Italy

== Aircraft ==
Aircraft flown by 3 Squadron
Note: Aircraft type photographs may not necessarily represent aircraft of the same mark or actual aircraft belonging to the squadron.
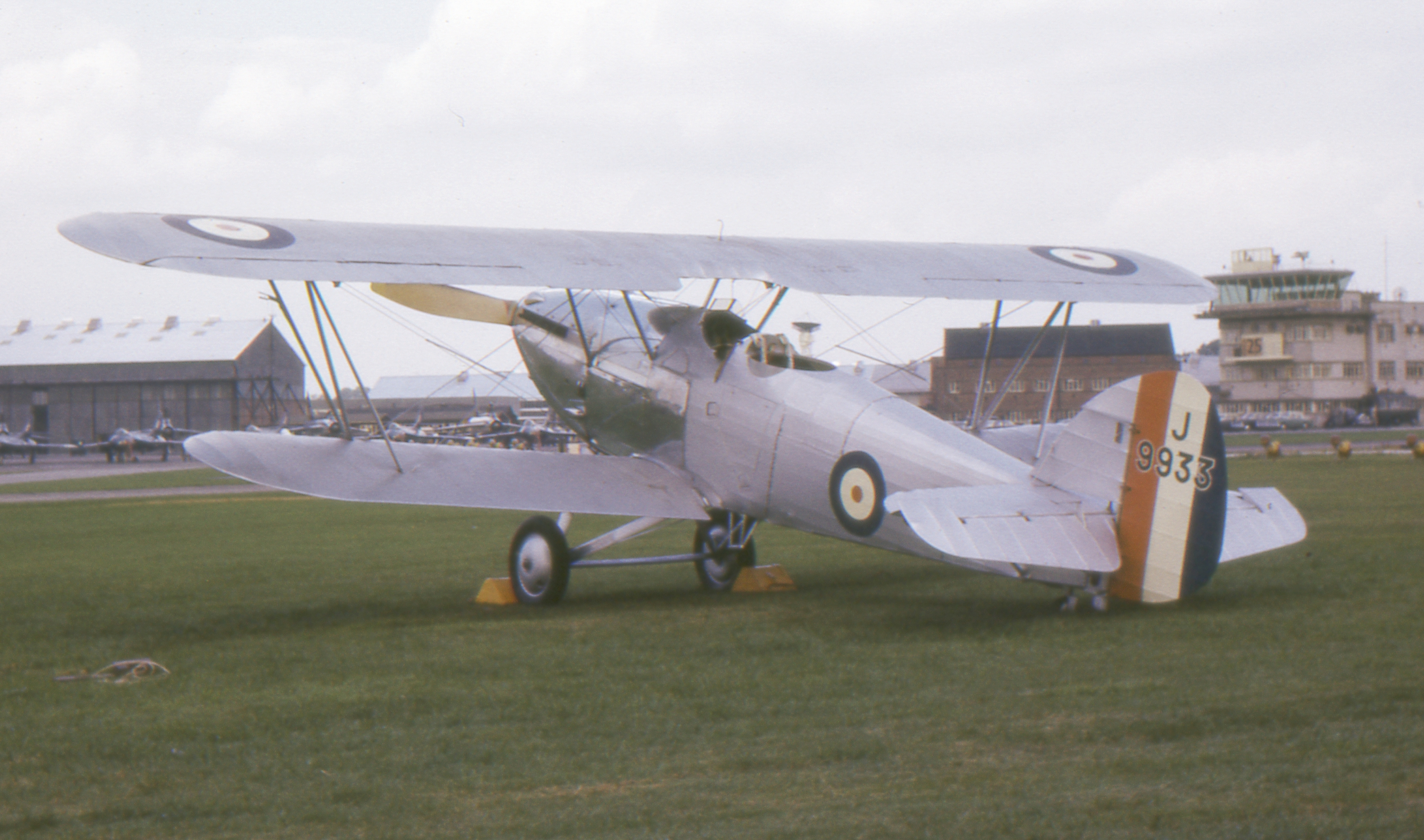
Hawker Hartbees or Hartebeeste I
1939

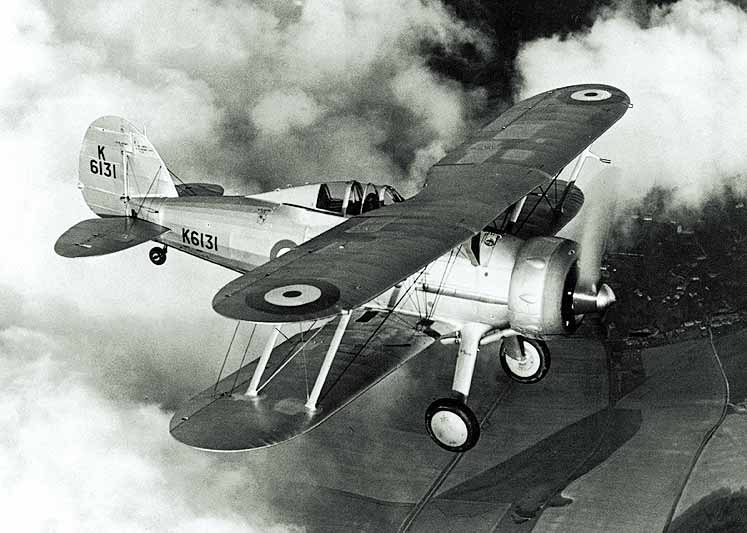
Gloster Gladiator Mk II
1939

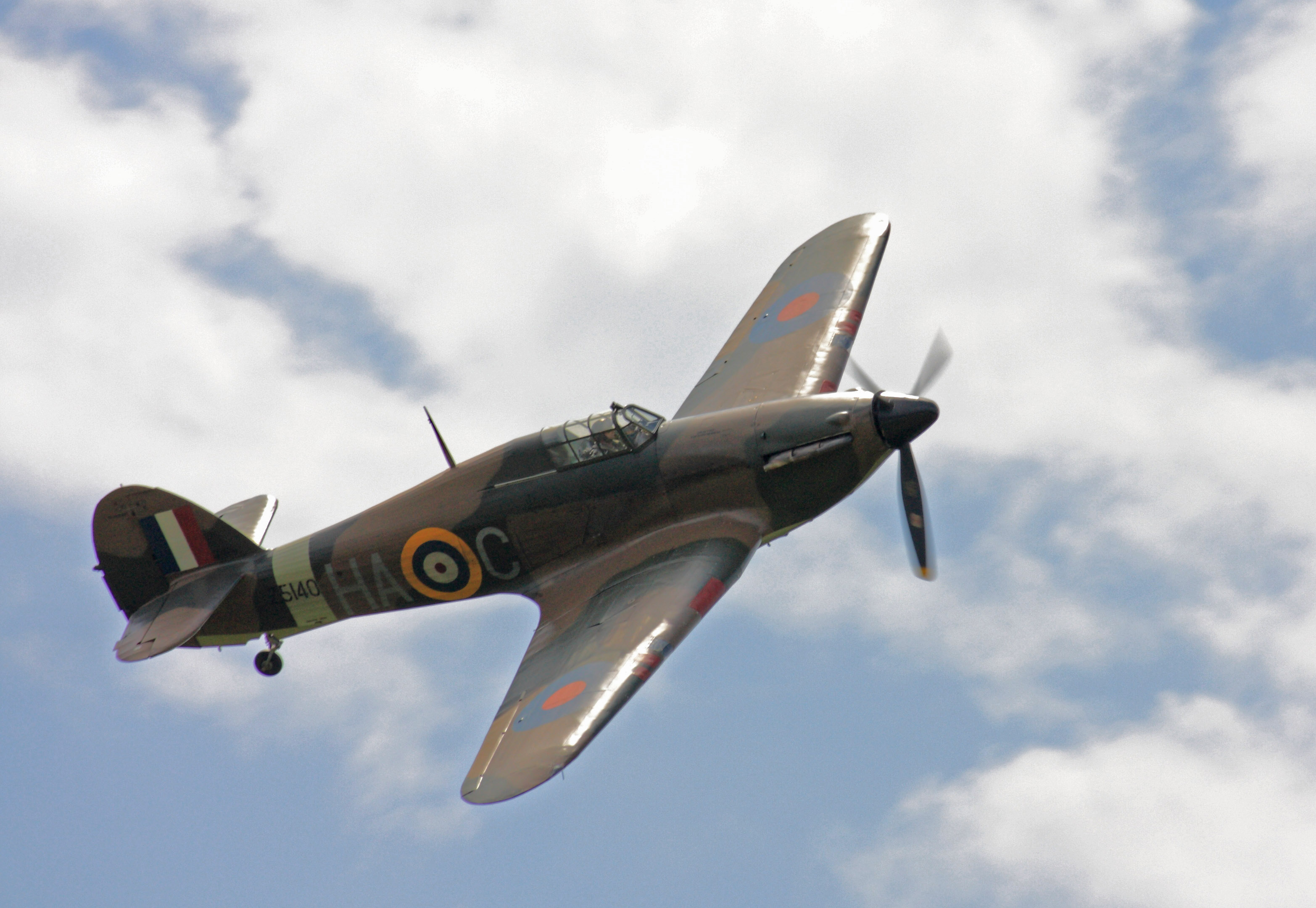
Hawker Hurricane Mk I
1941

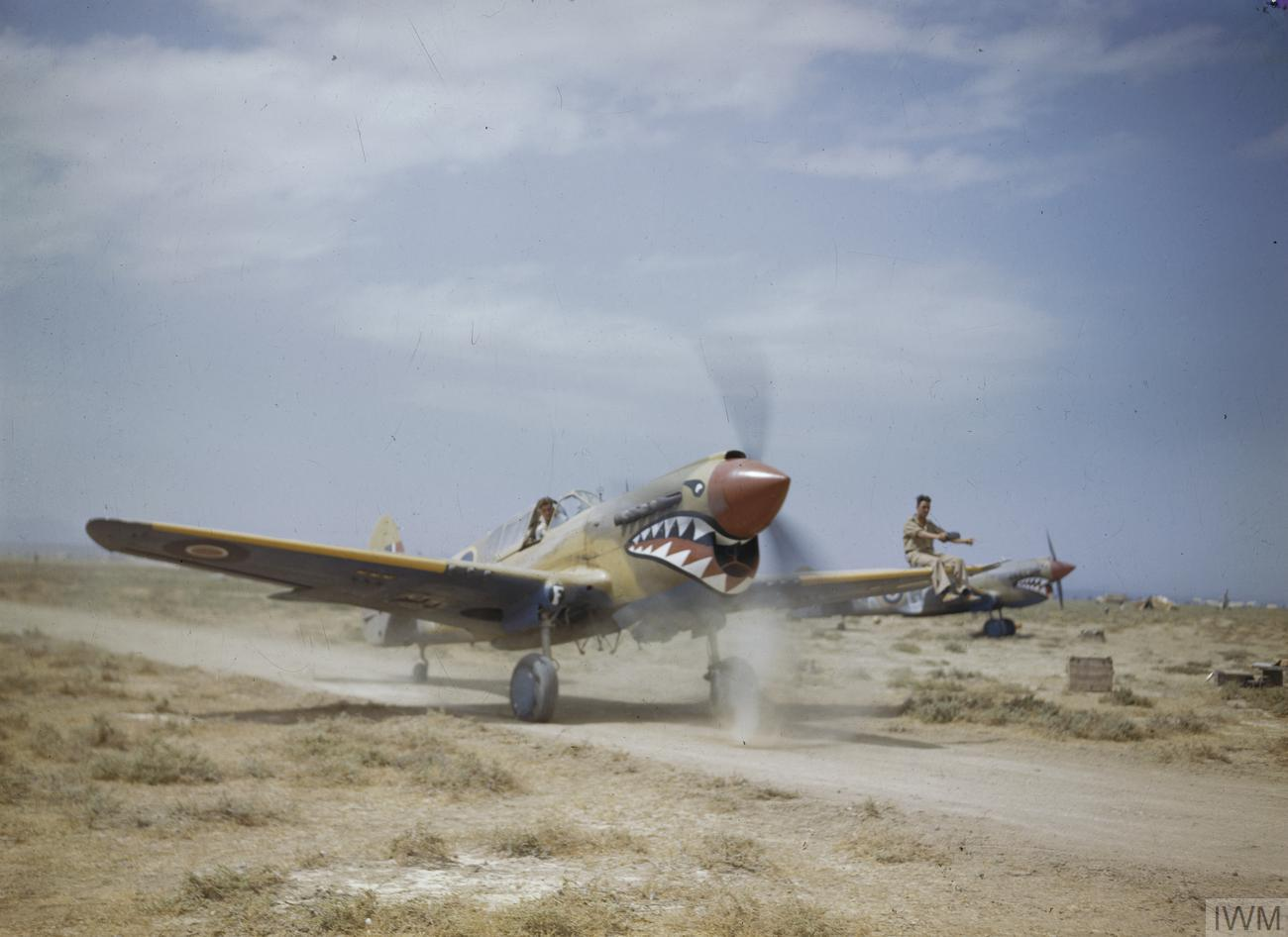
Curtis P-40 Kittyhawk
1941

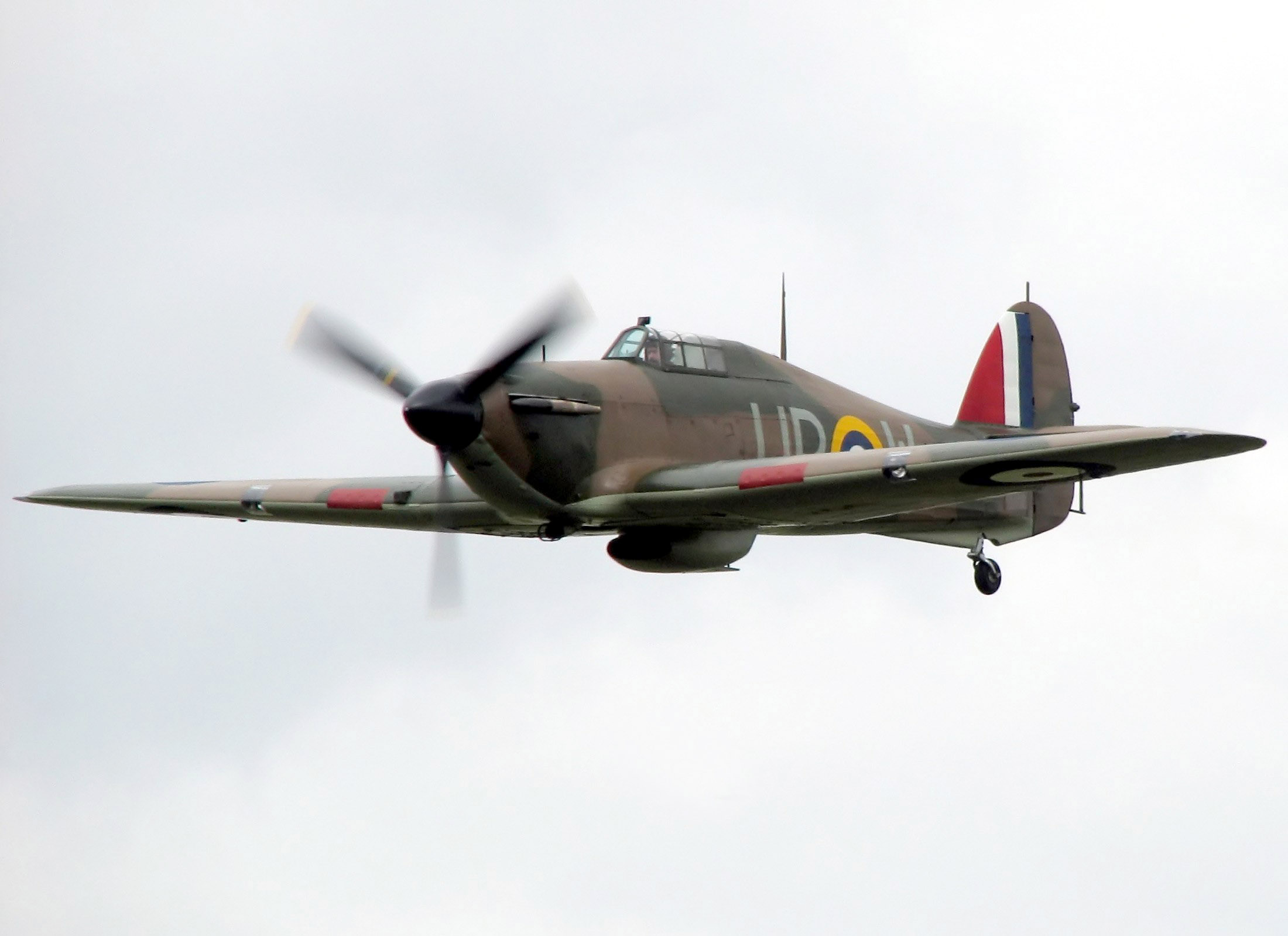
Hawker Hurricane Mk IIC
1943–44

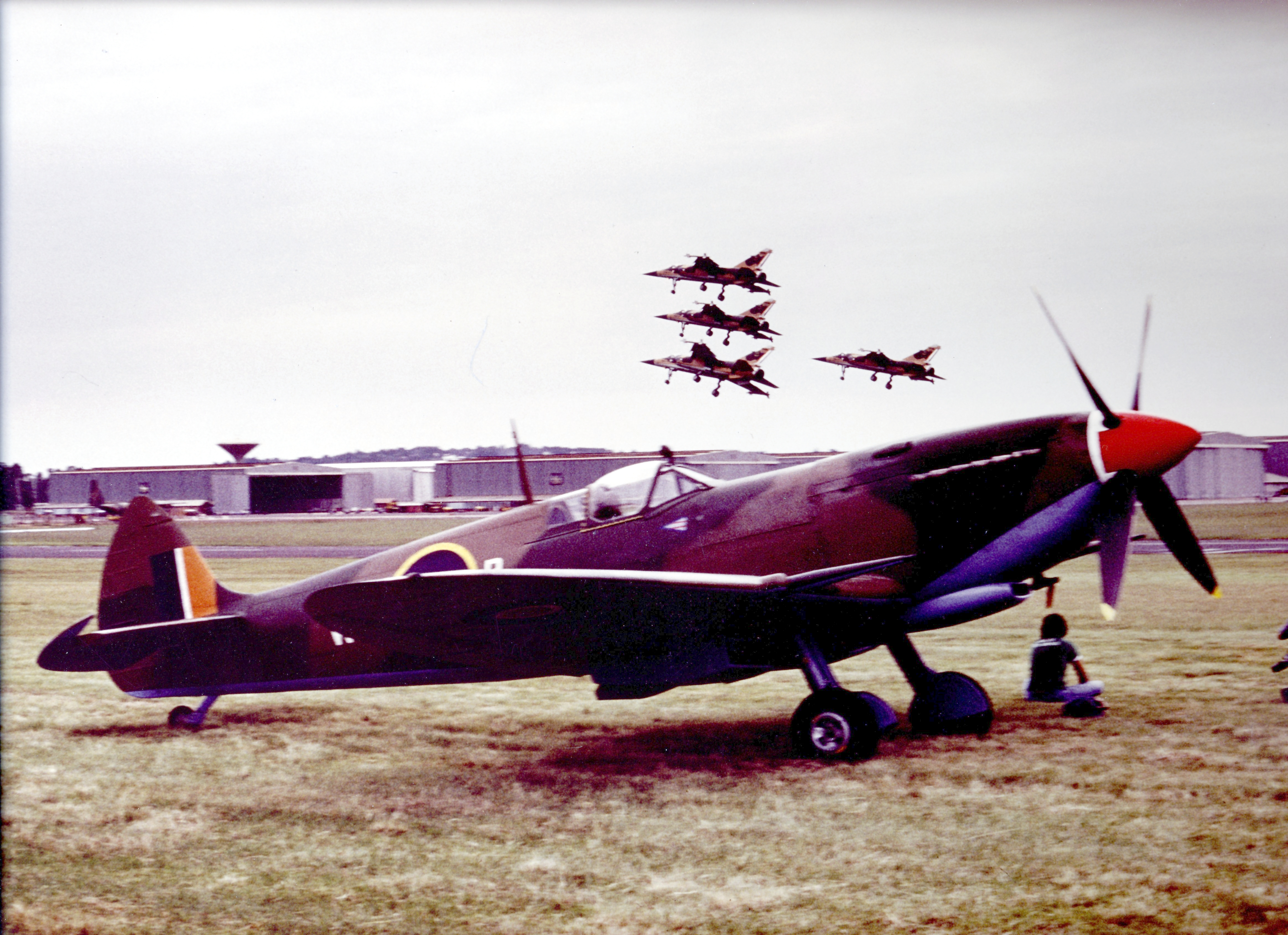
Supermarine Spitfire Mk IX
1944–45

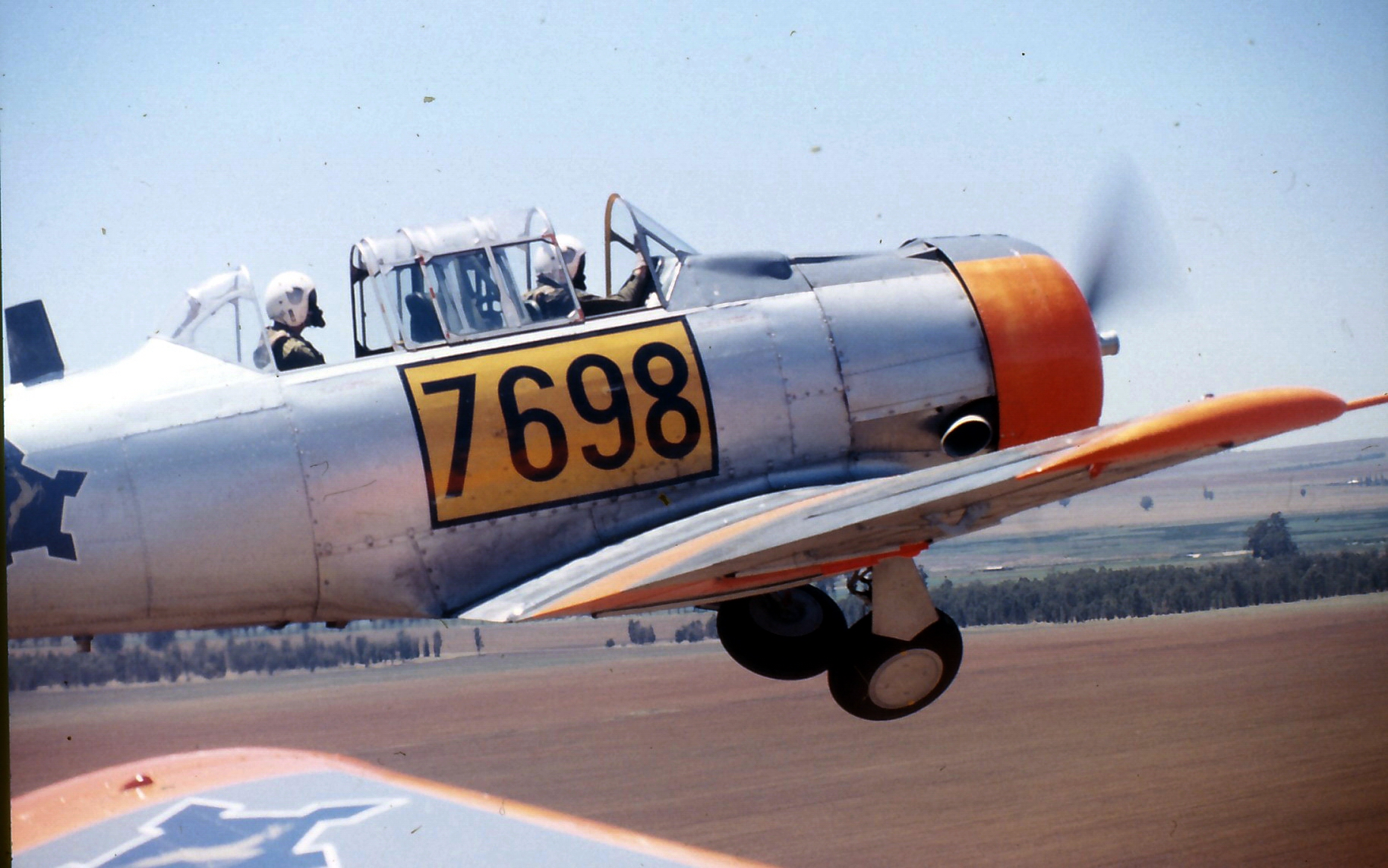
North American T-6 Harvard
1952–1957

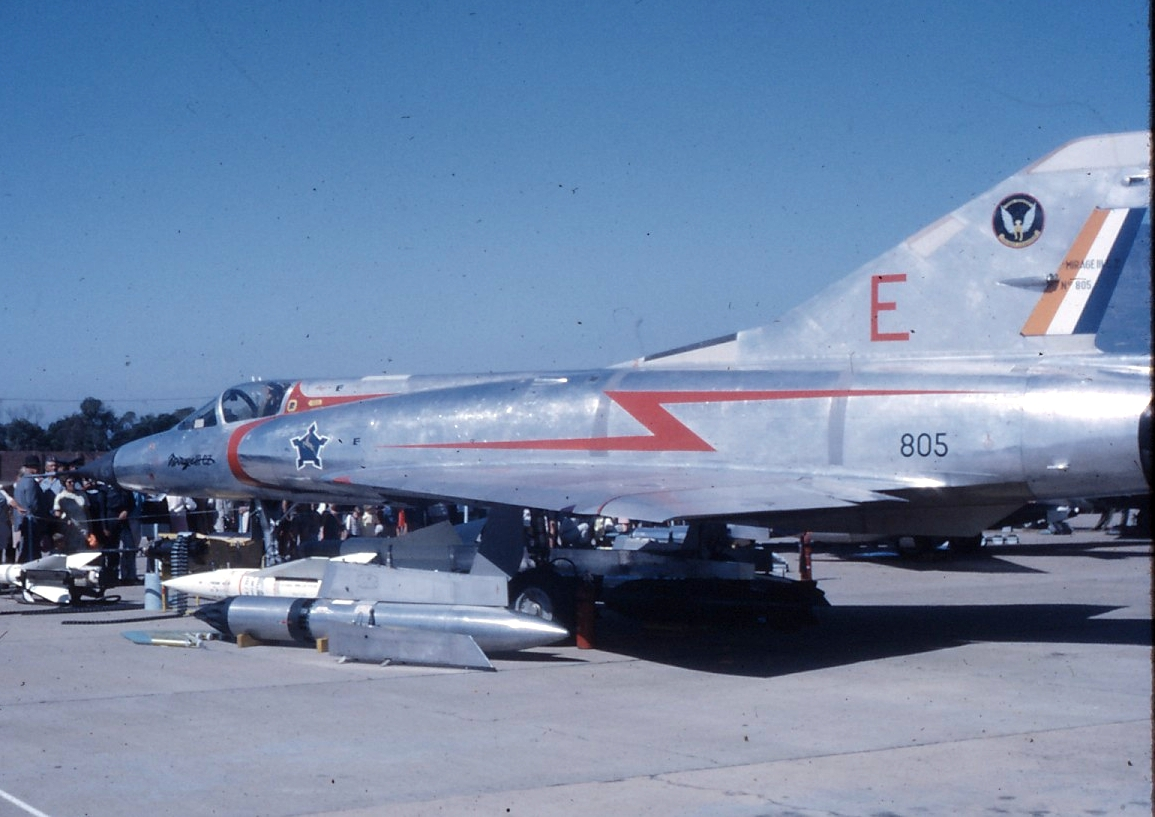
Mirage III
1966–1975

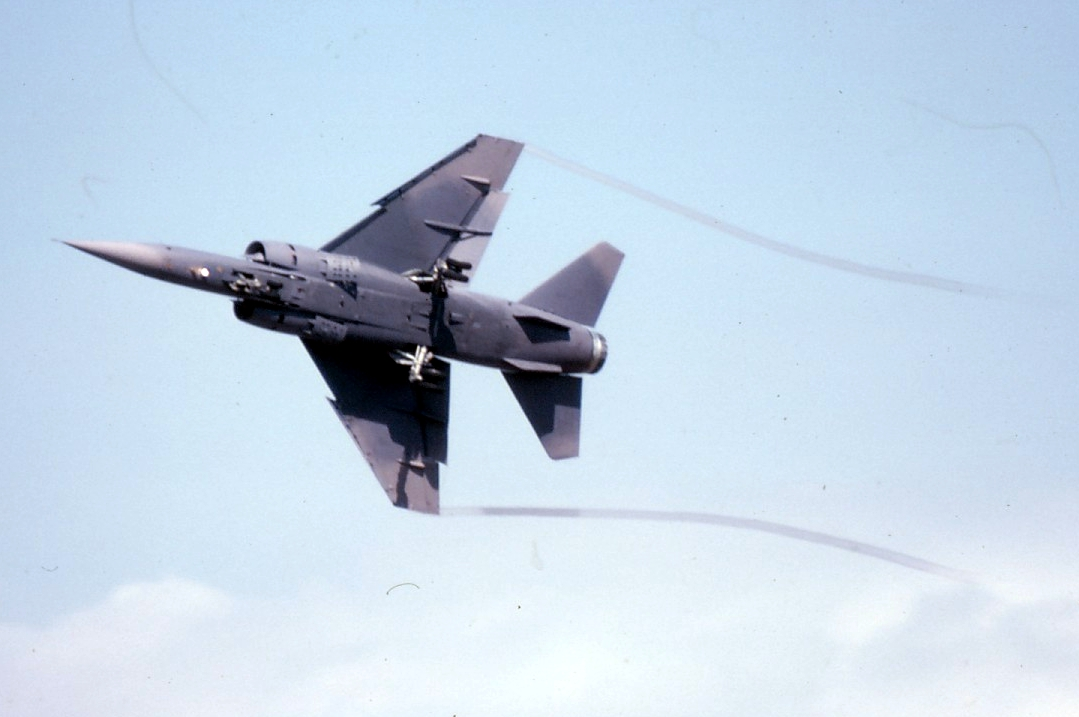
Mirage F1CZ
1975–1992
