= No. 8 Wing SAAF =

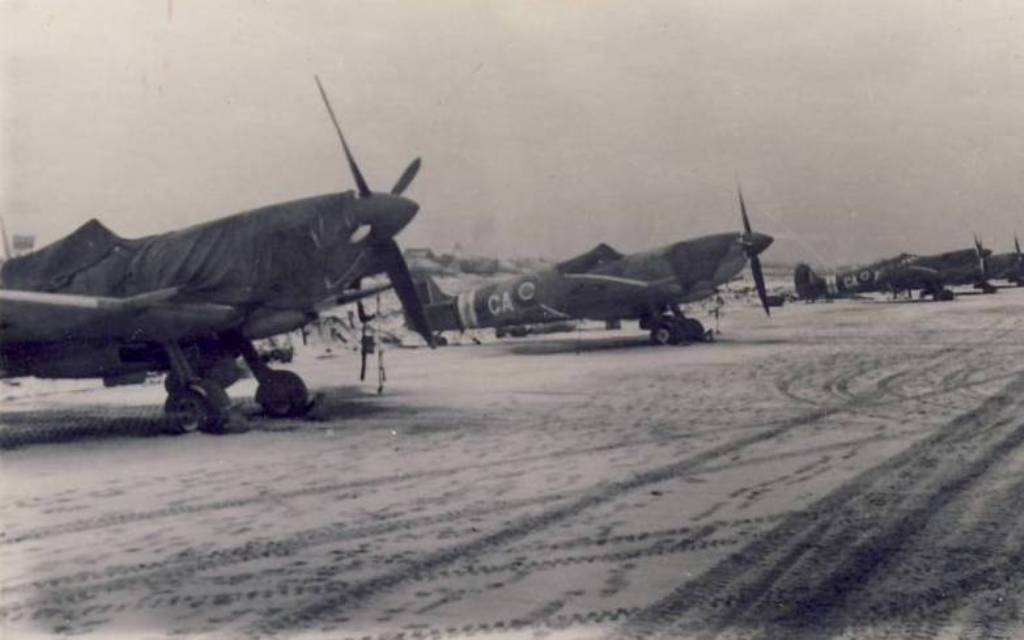
- Wintry conditions in Northern Italy for SAAF 8 Wing in 1944/1945
- Active: 1944 to 1945
- Country: South Africa
- Branch: South African Air Force
- Role: Fighter Bomber Wing

Commanders
- Colonel: Stephanus Francois du Toit

No. 8 Wing SAAF was a South African Air Force commanded formation during World War II that served in Italy, the Balkans and the Mediterranean Theatre. It was formed on 25 July 1944 and consisted of Royal Air Force and South African Air Force squadrons under South African command. MAAF on 13 June 1944 asked the SAAF to reman immediately a new defensive fighter wing HQ to embrace No. 3 Squadron, No. 11 Squadron and No. 41 Squadron. By 22 June the request had been approved. Col "Rosy" du Toit (promoted from Sweep Leader No. 7 (South African) Wing) opened the new office for the Wing in the SAAF Headquarters building in Bari on 16 July 1944. HQ 8 Wing would also take control of No. 87 Squadron RAF and No. 185 Squadron RAF Lt-Col D.D. "Snowy" Moodie was appointed Sweep Leader of the new Wing. On 25 July 8 Wing came under administrative control of Desert Air Force. 8 Wing Headquarters moved from Foiano to Borghetto on 10 September 1944. where the two RAF squadrons joined the Wing, together with RAF No. 53 RSU (Repair and Salvage Unit). By the end of September, a it became clear that the end of the war was not at hand, the SAAF had two fighter-bomber Wing operating in Europe simultaneously for the first time (7 Wing and 8 Wing).

8 Wing began fighter-bomber operations supporting the fighting in Italy and took part in offensive sweeps across the Balkans from its detached Italian bases. It continued in this role until the end of the war.

On 30 October 1945 8 Wing went back to Egypt to be disbanded.

== History ==
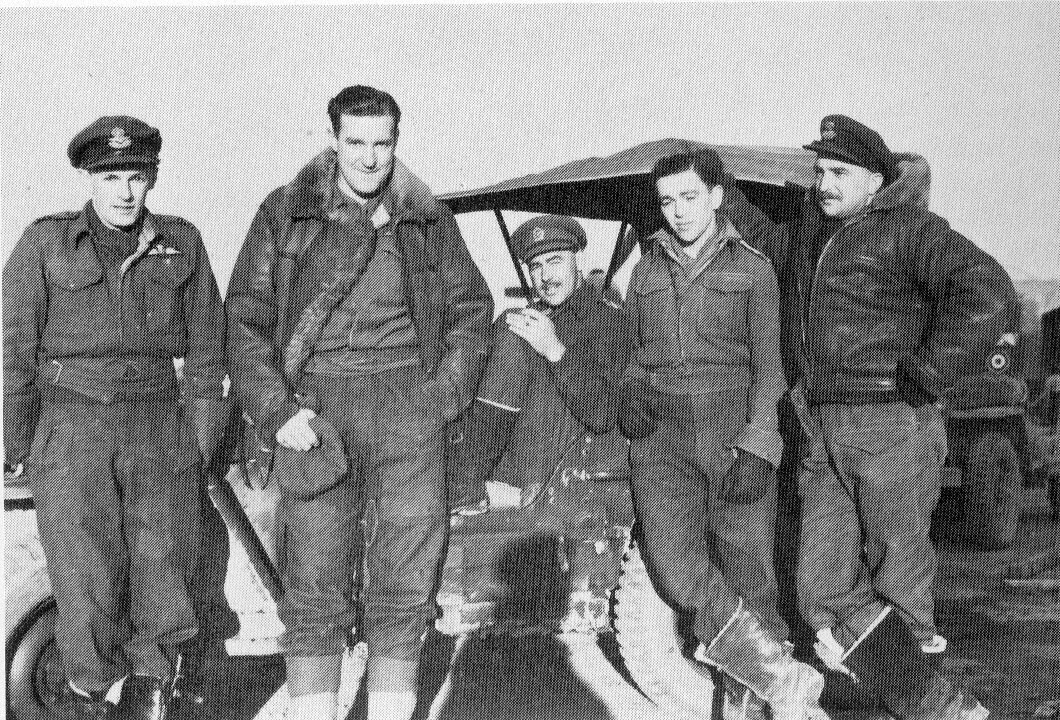
8 Wing squadron leaders and Wing OC (seated)

It was designated as a fighter bomber wing and its squadrons flew Spitfire Mk IXs (Spitbombers) and Curtiss Kittyhawk Mk.IVs. Col "Rosy" du Toit became the youngest officer in the SAAF to command a fighter wing in operations. He was decorated with CBE, DFC and Bar, US DFC and served in Abyssinia, in North Africa from EL Alamein to Tunis and in the Italian campaign with both 7 Wing and 8 Wing

== Organisation and Squadrons ==
No. 8 Wing SAAF organisation: 1941 - 1945
Date	Assigned Squadrons	Wing Commander	Higher formation
25 July 1944	3 Squadron SAAF; 11 Squadron SAAF; 41 Squadron SAAF; No. 87 Squadron RAF; No. 185 Squadron RAF	Col. S.F. du Toit-12 July 1944	
