= Hamilton Upton =

Canadian flying ace of WWII

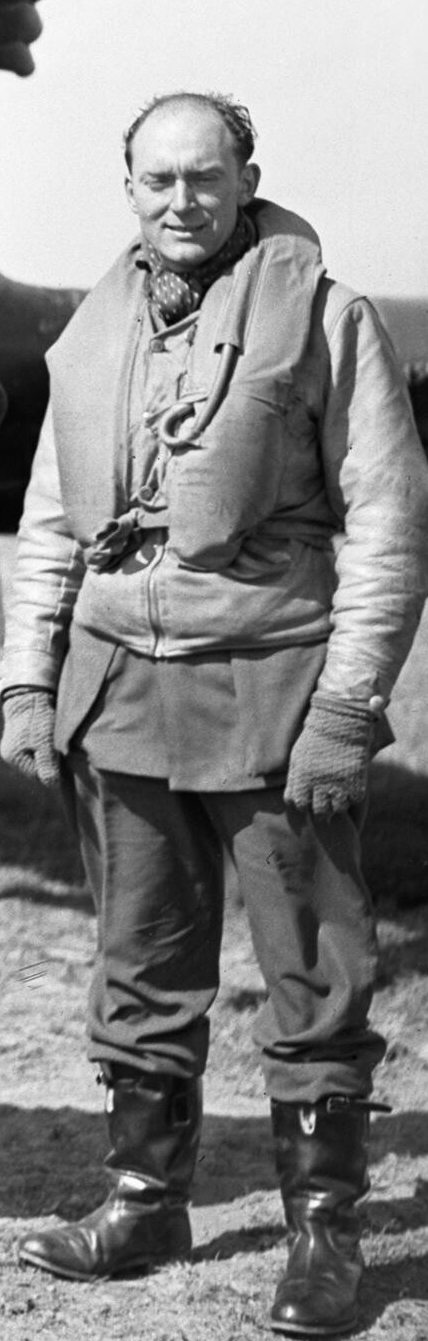
- Born: 13 March 1912; Manchester, United Kingdom
- Died: 1 August 1965 (aged 53); Truro, Nova Scotia, Canada
- Military career
- Allegiance: Canada
- Branch: Royal Air Force; Royal Canadian Air Force
- Service years: 1939–1945 (RAF); 1945–1953 (RCAF)
- Rank: Flight Lieutenant
- Units: No. 43 Squadron; No. 607 Squadron
- Conflicts: Second World War: Battle of Britain
- Awards: Distinguished Flying Cross

Hamilton Charles Upton, DFC (13 March 1912 – 1 August 1965) was a Canadian flying ace who served in the Royal Air Force (RAF) during the Second World War. During his service with the RAF, he was credited with at least eleven aerial victories.

Born in Manchester in the United Kingdom, Upton spent his early years in Vancouver, Canada. He joined the RAF in 1939 and when his training was completed was posted to No. 43 Squadron. He flew Hawker Hurricane fighters extensively during the Battle of Britain, during which he achieved all of his aerial victories. He subsequently briefly served with No. 607 Squadron but due to injuries arising from crash landings he made during the Battle of Britain, the majority of the remainder of his war service was as a flying instructor and fighter controller. Once the war in Europe ended, he transferred to the Royal Canadian Air Force with which he served until 1953. In civilian life, he worked in sales. He died in 1965, aged 53.

== Early life ==
Born in Manchester in the United Kingdom, Hamilton Charles Upton was raised in Vancouver, Canada. Known as Deryk, he joined the Royal Air Force in 1939, commencing his training in June of that year. He was granted a six-year short service commission two months later as an acting pilot officer on probation. He then went to No. 14 Flying Training School at Kinloss, completing this phase of training by the start of February 1940. His rank was confirmed at the same time, although he remained on probation.

== Second World War ==
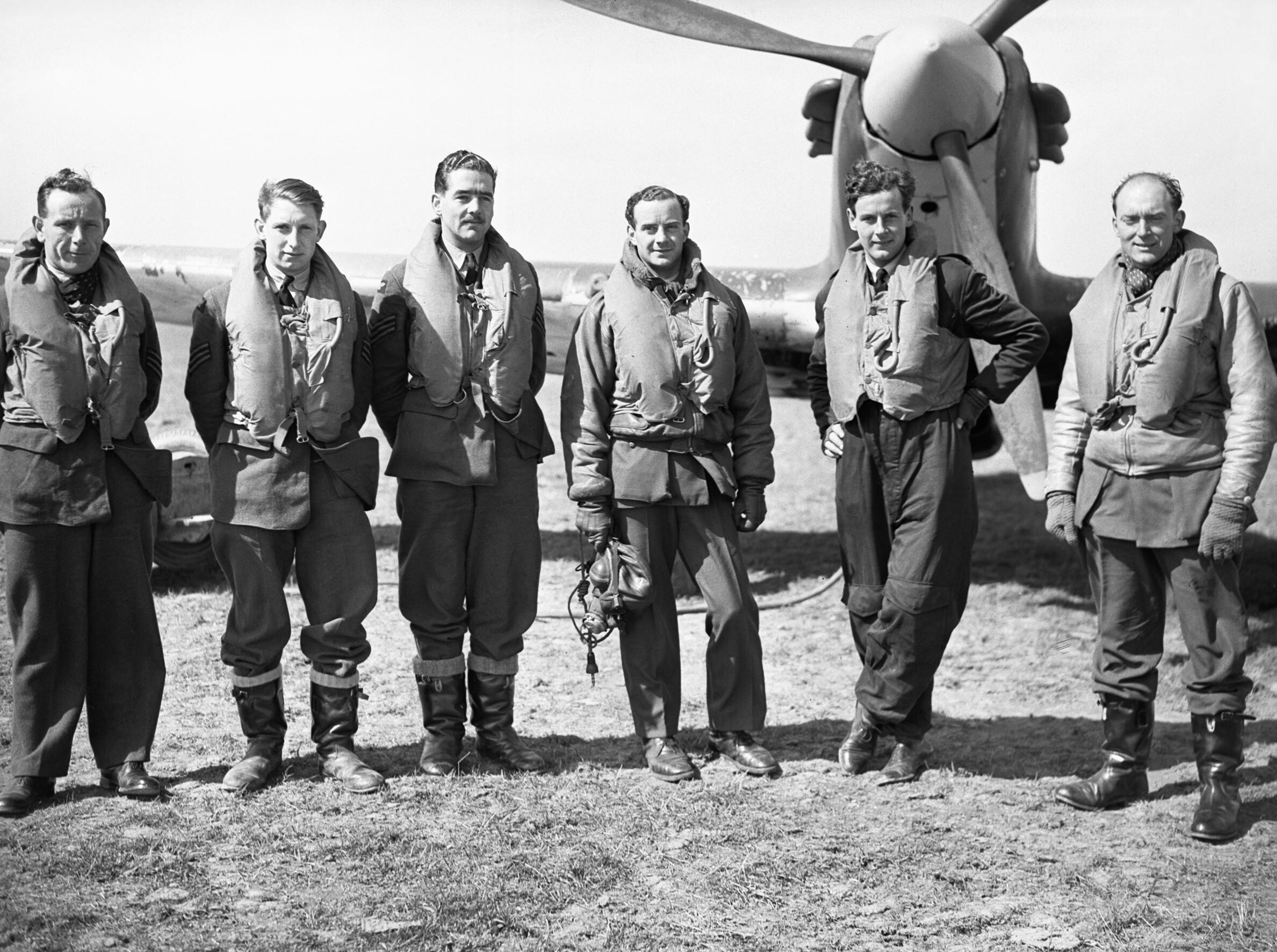
A group of pilots of No. 43 Squadron, April 1940; Upton stands on the far right

On 8 February 1940, Upton was posted to No. 43 Squadron. At the time, the squadron was based at Wick and operated Hawker Hurricane fighters on protective patrols over shipping moving along the north west coastline. A few months later, it was part of Scapa Flow's aerial defences. At the start of June, the squadron moved south to the RAF station at Tangmere. It immediately began operating over France, helping cover the evacuation beaches at Dunkirk. Its losses at this time saw it briefly being rested towards the end of June.

=== Battle of Britain ===
During the early stages of the Battle of Britain, No. 43 Squadron was involved in the aerial fighting over the English Channel, intercepting incoming Luftwaffe bombers. By this time, Upton had been confirmed in his pilot officer rank. On 12 July, he and three other pilots combined to destroy a Heinkel He 111 medium bomber to the north of Portsmouth. In the late afternoon of on 8 August, the Luftwaffe attacked a shipping convoy near the Isle of Wight. No. 43 Squadron was scrambled to deal with the threat and in the ensuring engagement, Upton shot down two Junkers Ju 87 dive bombers off Ventnor. A third Ju 87 was claimed as probably destroyed. His Hurricane developed an engine fault immediately afterwards and he had to make an emergency landing at Whitwell on the Isle of Wight.

Upton shot down a Dornier Do 17 medium bomber near Littlehampton on 13 August and then two days later destroyed another medium bomber, a Junkers Ju 88, near Thorney Island. In an engagement on 16 August south of Selsey Bill, he destroyed three Ju 87s. His own aircraft was damaged by return machine gun fire in this action and he had to make a forced landing on the beach at Selsey. On 18 August, what is now known as 'The Hardest Day', he shot down yet another Ju 87 and also a Messerschmitt Bf 109 fighter, both off Thorney Island. In a dogfight to the north west of Worthing on 4 September, Upton destroyed a Messerschmitt Bf 110 heavy fighter. A few days afterward, No. 43 Squadron relocated to Usworth for a rest.

Upton was transferred to No. 607 Squadron in late September. Here he was a flight commander with the unit which was stationed at Tangmere and equipped with Hurricanes. By this time, the Luftwaffe's aerial offensive was on the decline and although the squadron was still engaged in intercepting approaching German aircraft, Upton did not achieve any further aerial victories. In October, the squadron relocated to Turnhouse where for several weeks it was engaged in convoy patrols and also trained several pilots from the air forces of now German-occupied Central European countries.

=== Later war service ===
In December 1940, Upton was assigned to the RAF's Central Flying School at Upavon to undergo training as an instructor. Promoted to flying officer on 1 February 1941, he was subsequently awarded the Distinguished Flying Cross for "gallantry and devotion to duty in the execution of air operations". He spent the next several months on instructing duties, both in the United Kingdom and in Canada, and was promoted to flight lieutenant on 1 February 1942.

Injuries sustained during his crash landings in the Battle of Britain affected Upton's quality of life and he was also prone to periods of unconsciousness. He received medical treatment, including surgery, for his back. He spent the final year of the war as a fighter controller with No. 84 Group, part of the Second Tactical Air Force.

== Later life ==
In July 1945, with the war in Europe now over, Upton transferred to the Royal Canadian Air Force (RCAF). He served in the RCAF until 1953, at which time he retired from military service. In civilian life, he initially settled in Ontario, working for a radio station before soon relocating to Nova Scotia, living in Truro where he was employed in a sales and advertising role. He died there of a brain aneurysm on 1 August 1965, aged 53. He was buried at Robie Street Cemetery in Truro.

Upton is credited with having shot down eleven German aircraft, which included one shared with other pilots. He also claimed one German aircraft as probably destroyed.
