= Cecil Frederick King =

WW1 fighter pilot ace (1899–1919)

- Born: 19 February 1899; Sevenoaks, Kent, England
- Died: 24 January 1919 (aged 19); Sedgeford, Norfolk, England
- Burial place: St Mary the Virgin churchyard, Docking, Norfolk, England
- Military career
- Allegiance: United Kingdom
- Branch: Essex Regiment; Royal Flying Corps; Royal Air Force
- Service years: 1917–1919
- Rank: Captain
- Unit: No. 43 Squadron RAF
- Conflicts: First World War
- Awards: Military Cross; Distinguished Flying Cross; French Croix de Guerre

Captain Cecil Frederick King, MC, DFC (19 February 1899 – 24 January 1919), was a World War I fighter ace credited with 22 aerial victories.

== Early life ==
Cecil Frederick King was born to Frederick Hamilton King and Norah Carter King in Seven Oaks, Kent, England, the third of their four children. He was a member of Verites hou, at Charterhouse School, and became a member of the Officers Training Corps there in 1912.

At the beginning of World War I in the summer of 1914, he was living in Chelmsford. He joined the Essex Regiment Officers Training Corps as a private. He broke an arm in April 1915, which slowed his training.

== Aerial service ==
King joined the Royal Flying Corps in February, 1917. In the fall of 1917, he was assigned to No. 43 Squadron RFC to fly Sopwith Camels. In conjunction with fellow ace Lieutenant William MacLanachan, he drove down an Albatros D.III out of control on 12 November 1917.

King did not score again until February 1918; in the latter half of the month, he ran off a string of three more enemy craft driven down out of control, then became an ace by destroying an Albatros D.V on the 26th.

By March 1918, he had advanced to B Flight Commander. On 22 March 1918, he was awarded the Military Cross. He also scored three more times in March.

He won the French Croix de Guerre in July 1918 for strafing and bombing enemy troops during the Second Battle of the Marne. On 3 August 1918, King added a Distinguished Flying Cross to his medals.

By 8 August, his tally had grown to 19 victories, including eight straight in Camel no. D1864. He then switched to Sopwith Snipe no. E8031 for his final three victories.

A summary of King's triumphs shows he singlehandedly destroyed eight enemy aircraft (including one burned), shared two other destructions with other pilots, drove down seven enemy by himself, and cooperated with other pilots in driving down five others.

== Death ==
King died in a midair collision on 24 January 1919 over Sedgeford, Norfolk, while serving as a combat instructor with 33 Squadron. His death notice stated his parents lived at Springfield Dukes, Chelmsford. He is buried at the churchyard of St Mary the Virgin at Docking, Norfolk.

== Honours and awards ==
- Military Cross (MC)

T./2nd Lt. Cecil Frederick King, Gen. List and R.F.C.

Published in the London Gazette, King received the Military Cross, "For conspicuous gallantry and devotion to duty. On five occasions during a period of three months he has sent down four enemy machines completely out of control, and has destroyed one other. Later, under very adverse weather conditions he carried out a low reconnaissance, during which he engaged troops in a station, causing several casualties, fired into a body of the enemy entering a village from a height of 50 feet, attacked four gun limbers, causing the teams to stampede, and finally dived on to a parade of troops, who scattered in all directions. He has displayed exceptional daring and skill, which, combined with a splendid dash and initiative, have set a fine example to his squadron."

- Distinguished Flying Cross (DFC)

2nd Lt. (temp. Capt.) Cecil Frederick King, M.C.

According to the London Gazette, "[King] is a fine leader who at all times shows great gallantry and skill in manoeuvring; [King]'s energy and keenness have brought his flight to a high standard of efficiency. [King] frequently descends to low altitudes to obtain good results from bombing, and shooting, and on several occasions [King] has brought down enemy aeroplanes."

== Bibliography ==
- Franks, Norman (2003). Sopwith Camel aces of World War 1. Osprey Publishing. ISBN 978-1-84176-534-1. OCLC 472964558.
- Franks, Norman (2002). Dolphin and Snipe aces of World War 1. Osprey Publishing. ISBN 978-1-84176-317-0. OCLC 464792700.
