= John Badger (RAF officer) =

British flying ace of WWII

- Born: 31 May 1911; London, England
- Died: 30 June 1941 (aged 30) (DOW); Halton, England
- Burial place: St. Michael and All Angels, Halton, England
- Military career
- Allegiance: United Kingdom
- Branch: Royal Air Force
- Service years: 1933–1941
- Rank: Squadron Leader
- Commands: No. 43 Squadron
- Conflicts: Second World War: Battle of Britain
- Awards: Distinguished Flying Cross; Mentioned in Despatches

John Badger, DFC (31 May 1911 – 30 June 1941) was a British flying ace of the Royal Air Force (RAF) during the Second World War. He is credited with the destruction of at least ten aircraft.

Born in London, Badger joined the RAF in 1928 as an apprentice tradesman. Three years later, he was awarded a flying cadetship and subsequently trained as a pilot. He was then posted to No. 43 Squadron for a time. Serving as a staff officer with No. 13 Group at the outbreak of the Second World War, he returned to No. 43 Squadron in June 1940, becoming its commander the following month. He destroyed a number of German aircraft during the Battle of Britain but was severely injured on 30 August. During the period he was hospitalised he was awarded the Distinguished Flying Cross and Mentioned in Despatches. He never recovered from his injuries, dying of his wounds on 30 June 1941.

== Early life ==
John Vincent Clarence Badger was born on 31 May 1911 in London, England. His parents were from County Antrim in Northern Ireland. Schooled at the Belfast Academical Institute, in 1928, when he was seventeen, he joined the Royal Air Force (RAF) as an aircraft apprentice tradesman. He completed his apprenticeship in August 1931 and was awarded a flying cadetship at the RAF College at Cranwell. He graduated on 15 July 1933, with the Sword of Honour as the best student, and was given a permanent commission as a pilot officer.

Badger's first posting was to No. 43 Squadron. This unit, known for its aerobatics team, operated the Hawker Fury biplane fighter from Tangmere. In October 1934 he was loaned to the Fleet Air Arm and underwent training at the School of Naval Co-operation at Lee-on-Solent and the following May was then assigned to 821 Naval Air Squadron. By this time Badger held the rank of flying officer. He spent time with the unit on the aircraft carrier HMS Courageous as well as at its shore facility at Eastleigh. Promoted to flight lieutenant in January 1937, later in the year he was posted to the Marine Aircraft Establishment at Felixstowe. He was promoted to squadron leader on 1 April 1939.

== Second World War ==
At the time of the outbreak of the Second World War, Badger was serving as an intelligence officer on the staff of No. 13 Group. In early 1940 he underwent refresher flying training and was then sent to Achicourt in France. There he was a staff officer at No. 14 Group. Returning to England after the Battle of France, on 21 June he was posted back to No. 43 Squadron as a supernumerary pilot.

=== Battle of Britain ===
At the time, No. 43 Squadron, which operated the Hawker Hurricane fighter, was being rested at Tangmere after experiencing some losses during its operations earlier in the month over Dunkirk providing aerial cover as the British Expeditionary Force was evacuated from the beaches there. When it returned to operations during the early stages of the Battle of Britain, the squadron was involved in the aerial fighting over the English Channel, intercepting incoming Luftwaffe bombers. On 9 July, the squadron's commander, Squadron Leader Charles Lott, was wounded and Badger took command of the unit. Three days later he shared in the destruction of a Heinkel He 111 medium bomber to the north of Fort Nelson and 21 July he shot down a pair of Dornier Do 17 medium bombers.

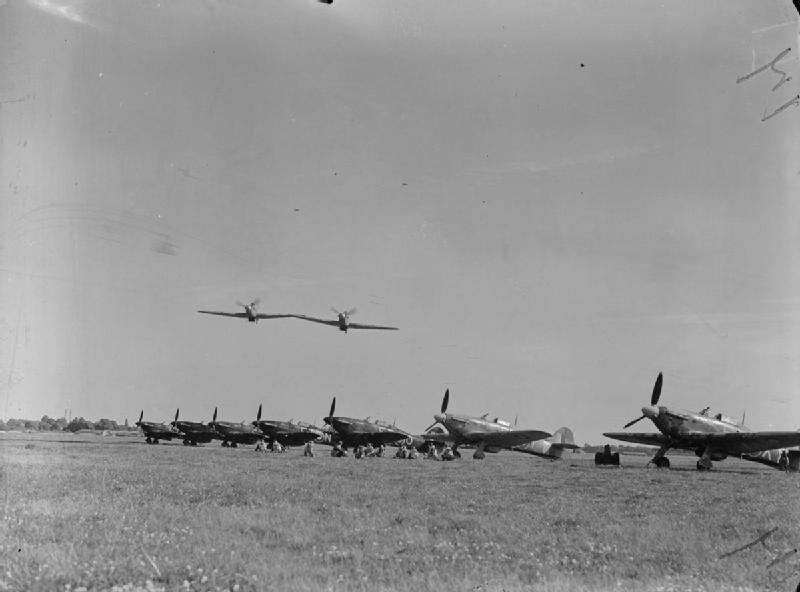
Hawker Hurricane fighters of No. 43 Squadron at Tangmere

In the late afternoon of 8 August Badger claimed a Messerschmitt Bf 109 fighter as probably destroyed over the English Channel. He damaged two Junkers Ju 88 medium bombers near Littlebourne on 13 August. The next day, he shot down a Ju 88 over The Needles. This was followed by his destruction of another Ju 88 over Thorney Island on 15 August. Badger shot down three Junkers Ju 87 dive bombers to the south of Selsey Bill the next day, part of a large raid mounted by the Luftwaffe on The Solent. On 26 August he destroyed one He 111 to the southwest of Selsey Bill and also shared in the shooting down of a second over Portsmouth.

On 30 August Badger's Hurricane was damaged in an engagement with some Bf 109s and he bailed out near Woodchurch. He landed in a tree but was severely injured due to being impaled on a branch. Initially hospitalised at Ashford he was later moved to the RAF Hospital at Halton. His successes over the preceding weeks saw Badger awarded the Distinguished Flying Cross in early September. The citation, published in The London Gazette on 6 September, read:

This officer assumed command of a squadron in July 1940 and it is through his personal leadership that the squadron has achieved so many successes since the intensive air operations began. He has been instrumental in destroying six enemy aircraft. In spite of the fact that on three occasions he has returned with his aircraft very badly damaged through enemy cannon fire, he has immediately taken off again to lead his squadron on patrol. Squadron Leader Badger has displayed great courage and resolution.

— London Gazette, No. 34940, 6 September 1940

Badger was Mentioned in Despatches in the 1941 New Year Honours. He never recovered from his injuries and died at Halton, still in hospital. He is buried at the churchyard of St. Michael and All Angels in Halton.

Badger is credited with having destroyed ten aircraft, two of which were shared with other pilots. He is believed to have also probably destroyed one aircraft and damaged two others.
