= No. 43 Squadron RAF =

Defunct flying squadron of the Royal Air Force

No. 43 (China-British) Squadron RAF
- No. 43 Squadron badge
- Active: 15 April 1916 – 1 April 1918 (RFC); 1 April 1918 – 31 December 1919 (RAF); 1 July 1925 – 16 May 1947; 1 February 1949 – 14 October 1967; 1 September 1969 – 13 July 2009
- Country: United Kingdom
- Branch: Royal Air Force
- Nickname: 'The Fighting Cocks'
- Mottos: Latin: Gloria finis ("Glory is the end")
- Battle honours: Western Front (1917–1918), Arras (1917), Ypres (1917)*, Cambrai (1917), Somme (1918)*, Lys, Amiens (1918), Dunkirk (1940)*, Battle of Britain (1940)*, Home Defence (1940–1942), Fortress Europe (1942), Dieppe, *North Africa (1942–1943)*, Sicily (1943), Salerno, Italy (1943–1945), Anzio and Nettuno*, Gustav Line, France and Germany (1944)*, Gulf (1991), Iraq (2003); Honours marked with an asterisk* are emblazoned on the Squadron Standard

Insignia
- Squadron Badge: A Gamecock
- Squadron Roundel
- Squadron Codes: NQ (November 1938 – September 1939); FT (September 1939 – May 1947); SW (February 1949 – April 1951); AA–AZ (1986 – July 1989); GA–GZ (September 1989 – June 2009)

Number 43 Squadron, nicknamed the Fighting Cocks, was a Royal Air Force aircraft squadron originally formed in April 1916 as part of the Royal Flying Corps. It saw distinguished service during two world wars, producing numerous "aces". The squadron last operated the Panavia Tornado F3 from RAF Leuchars, Scotland, in the air defence role, until it was disbanded in July 2009.

== History ==
=== First World War ===
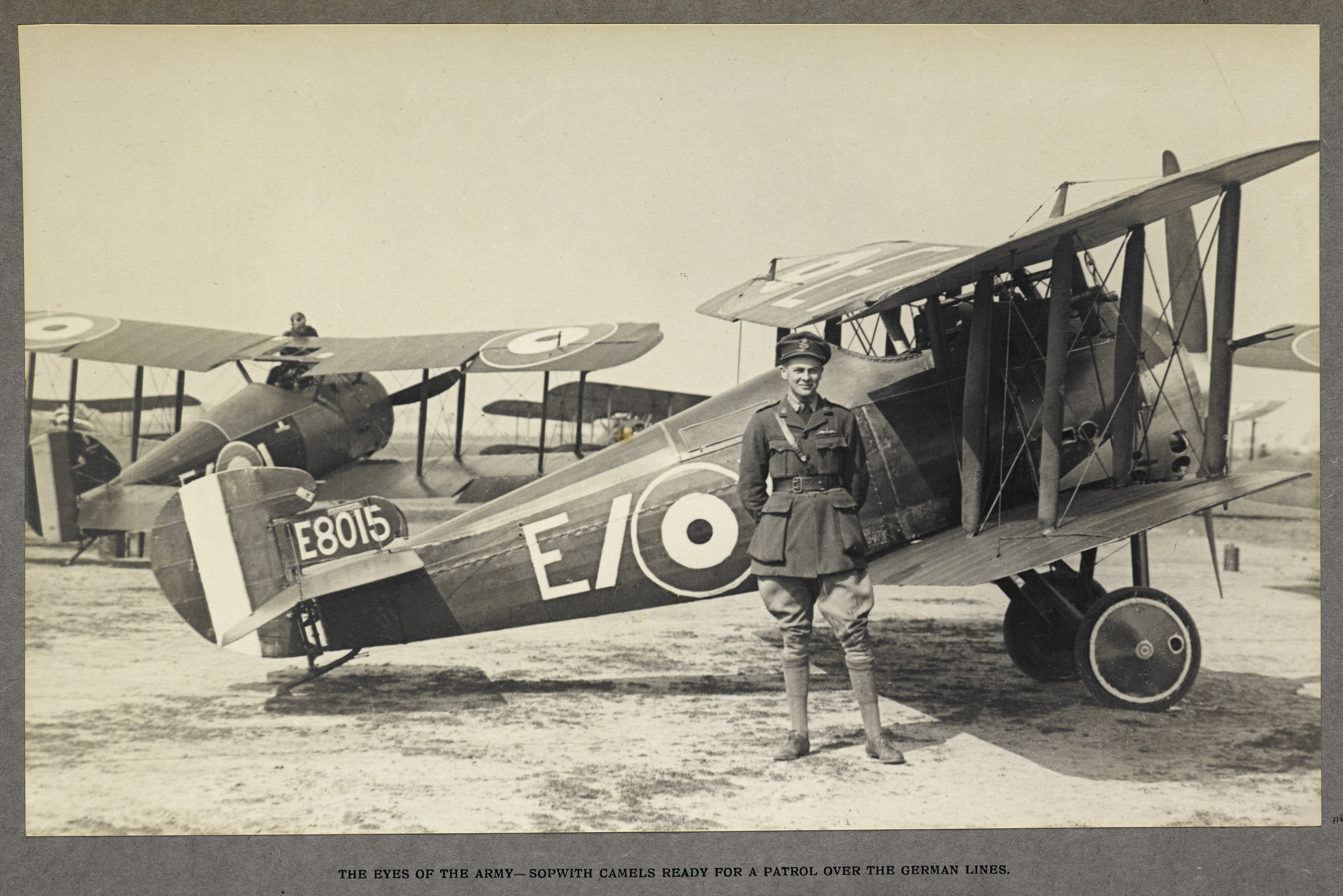
Sopwith Snipe E8015 of No. 43 Squadron, late 1918.

The squadron was formed at Stirling, Scotland, on 15 April 1916, from No. 18 Reserve Squadron as a unit of the Royal Flying Corps, and was equipped with various types, which it used for training until December 1916 when Sopwith 1½ Strutters arrived. These were taken to the Western Front the following month, where it operated as an Army squadron carrying out fighter reconnaissance duties.

In September 1917, Sopwith Camels arrived, and the squadron undertook ground attack duties; the squadron continued in this vein until the end of the war. It was based at La Gorgue in northern France from 15 January until 22 March 1918.

The squadron received Sopwith Snipe in August 1918 and conversion was completed in October, but the Armistice prevented these playing a major part in the conflict, instead they were taken to Germany for occupation duties until August 1919, when the squadron moved to RAF Spitalgate and was disbanded on 31 December 1919.

During the course of the war, ten aces served in the squadron, including Henry Woollett, Cecil Frederick King, John Lightfoot Trollope, Geoffrey Bailey, Harold Balfour, Charles C. Banks, Hector Daniel, George Lingham, and John Womersley, all surviving the war. (Robert Johnstone Owen).

=== Between the wars ===
The squadron was re-formed at RAF Henlow, Bedfordshire, on 1 July 1925, (or 1 July 1923), once again equipped with Sopwith Snipes. In 1926, the squadron converted to Gloster Gamecocks, thus inspiring the squadron badge and the nickname "The Fighting Cocks". The black and white checkered markings also date from this era. The squadron flew Armstrong Whitworth Siskins from 1928 and received the first production Hawker Fury Mk.I in May 1931.

=== Second World War ===
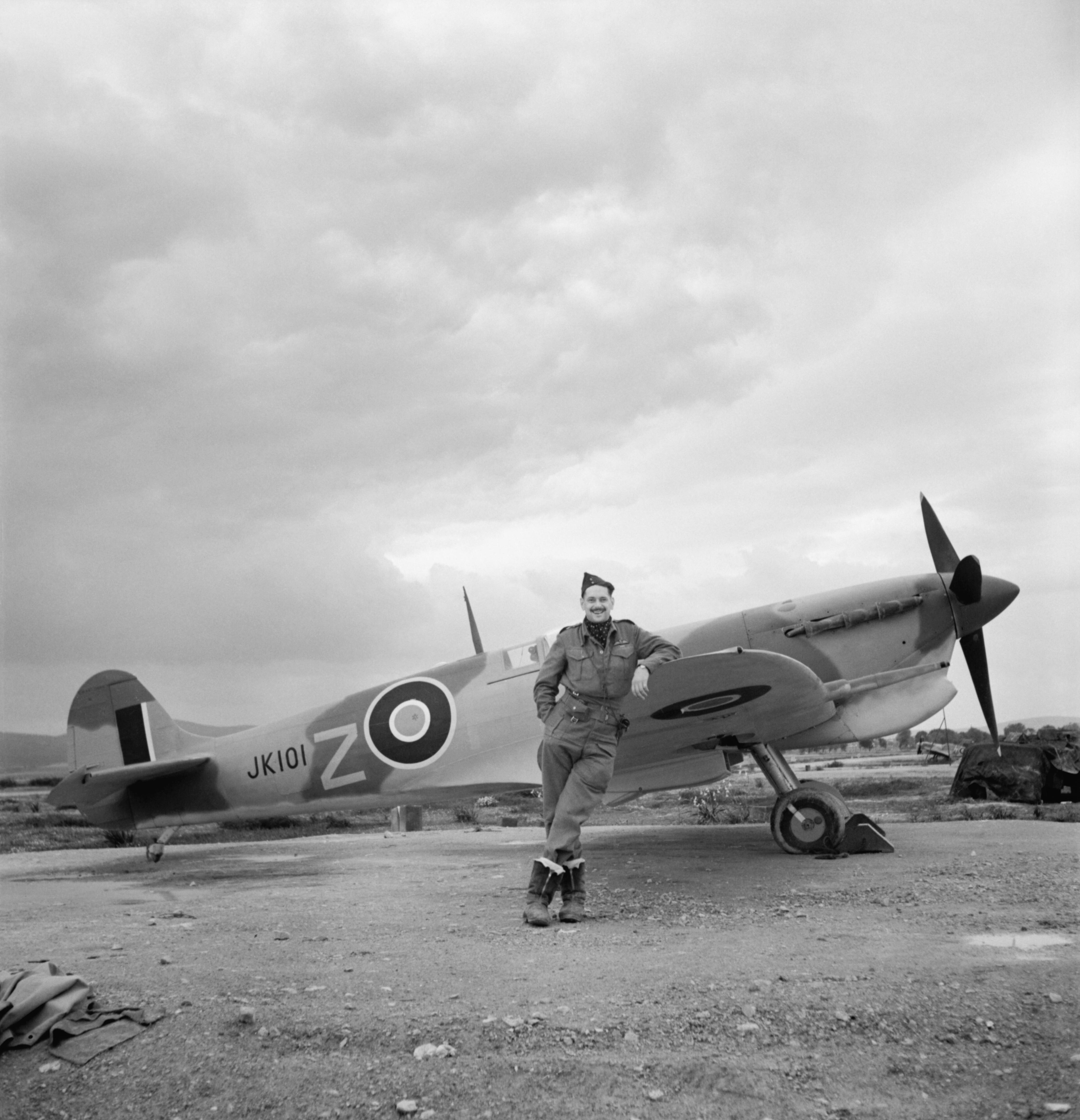
Supermarine Spitfire Mk.Vc JK101 of No. 43 Squadron at Jemmapes, Algeria.

Prior to the outbreak of World War II the squadron re-equipped with Hawker Hurricane Mk.Is.

On 3 February 1940, three No. 43 Squadron Hurricanes based at RAF Acklington intercepted and shot down a Luftwaffe Heinkel He 111 bomber at Whitby. The formation was led by Flight Lieutenant Peter Townsend. The other two pilots were Flying Officer "Tiger" Folkes and Sergeant James Hallowes. It was the first German aircraft to fall on English soil in World War II (although it was not the first to be shot down in the United Kingdom, that having occurred in Scotland). Townsend visited the German rear gunner in hospital the next day, and visited him again in 1968 when Townsend was writing his highly-successful book about the Battle of Britain, "Duel of Eagles," which recounts the incident in detail.

Still flying Hurricanes, the squadron covered the Dunkirk retreat, and fought in the Battle of Britain.

In November 1942, No. 43 Squadron moved to North Africa, now flying Supermarine Spitfire Mk.Vcs.

In 1944, as the tide of war turned in favour of the Allies, the squadron moved to France, where it was known by the local French population as "les coqs Anglais". By then the squadron's main role was ground attack, strafing and occasionally dive bombing enemy targets. On 9 September 1944, Wing Commander Barrie Heath, flying Spitfire Mk.IX MJ628, led a formation on the squadron's first sortie into German territory, strafing motor transport and railway communications.

The squadron ended the war in Austria and was disbanded on 16 May 1947.

=== Entering the Jet Age and RAF Khormaksar (1949–1967) ===
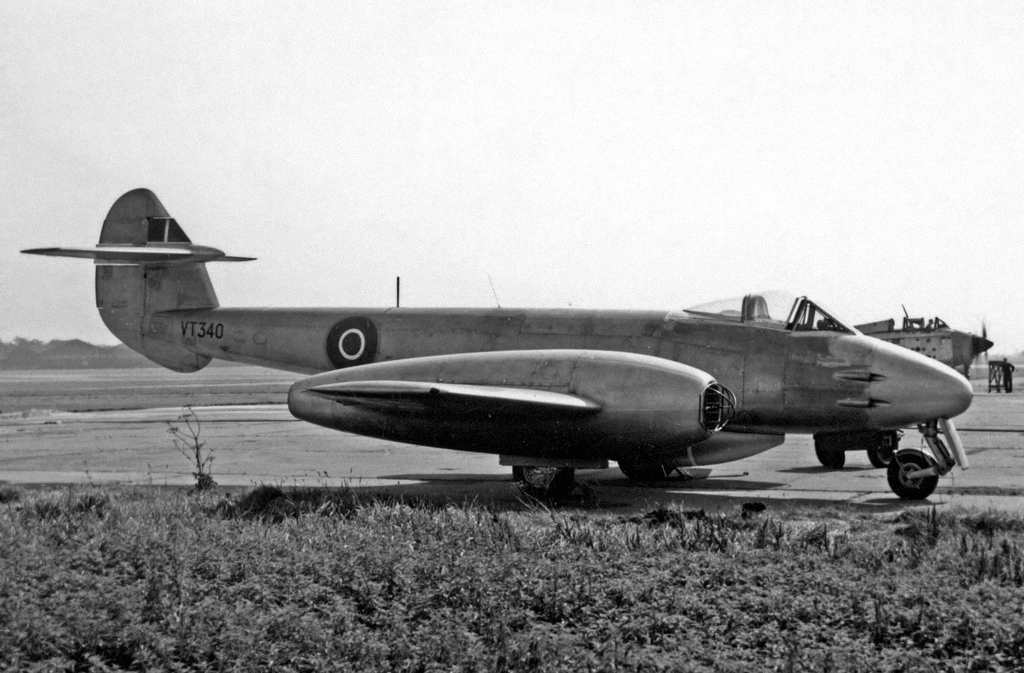
Gloster Meteor F.4, similar to what No. 43 (F) Squadron operated between 1949 and 1950.

On 1 February 1949, No. 266 Squadron was renumbered to No. 43 (Fighter) Squadron, flying Gloster Meteor F.4s from RAF Tangmere, Sussex. The squadron moved to RAF Leuchars, Fife, in 1950 and in 1954 became the first to receive the Hawker Hunter F.1, replacing the Meteor F.8. No. 43 (Fighter) Squadron began receiving its first Hunter F.4s on 24 February 1956, before receiving four Hunter F.6s on 2 November 1956 however these were only operated until early December. The Hunters of No. 43 Squadron featured in the 1957 film High Flight. The squadron began to receive the Hunter F.6 for the second time on 10 January 1958, these were operated until being replaced by the Hunter FGA.9, which began to arrive in May 1960.

The Fighting Cocks relocated to RAF Nicosia, Cyprus, in June 1961, before further relocating to RAF Khormaksar, Aden, on 1 March 1963, becoming part of Middle East Command (MEC). Within five days of arrival, No. 43 (F) Squadron was flying sorties in the Beihan region as a show of force against the Mutawakkilite Kingdom of Yemen, and by the end of the month had managed 264 flying hours. While based at RAF Khormaksar, No. 43 (F) Squadron operated alongside Nos. 8 and 208 Squadrons as part of the Khormaksar Tactical Wing. On 20 June 1963, the squadron sent a detachment of Hunters to Bahrain, relieving No. 8 Squadron, before returning on 22/23 August. The Fighting Cocks sent another detachment on 24 September, this time to Nairobi, Kenya, with the main purpose being to provide a flying display at the Royal Show, before returning to Khormaksar on 6 October. The squadron briefly relocated to RAF Muharraq, Bahrain, from late December 1963 until late February 1964.

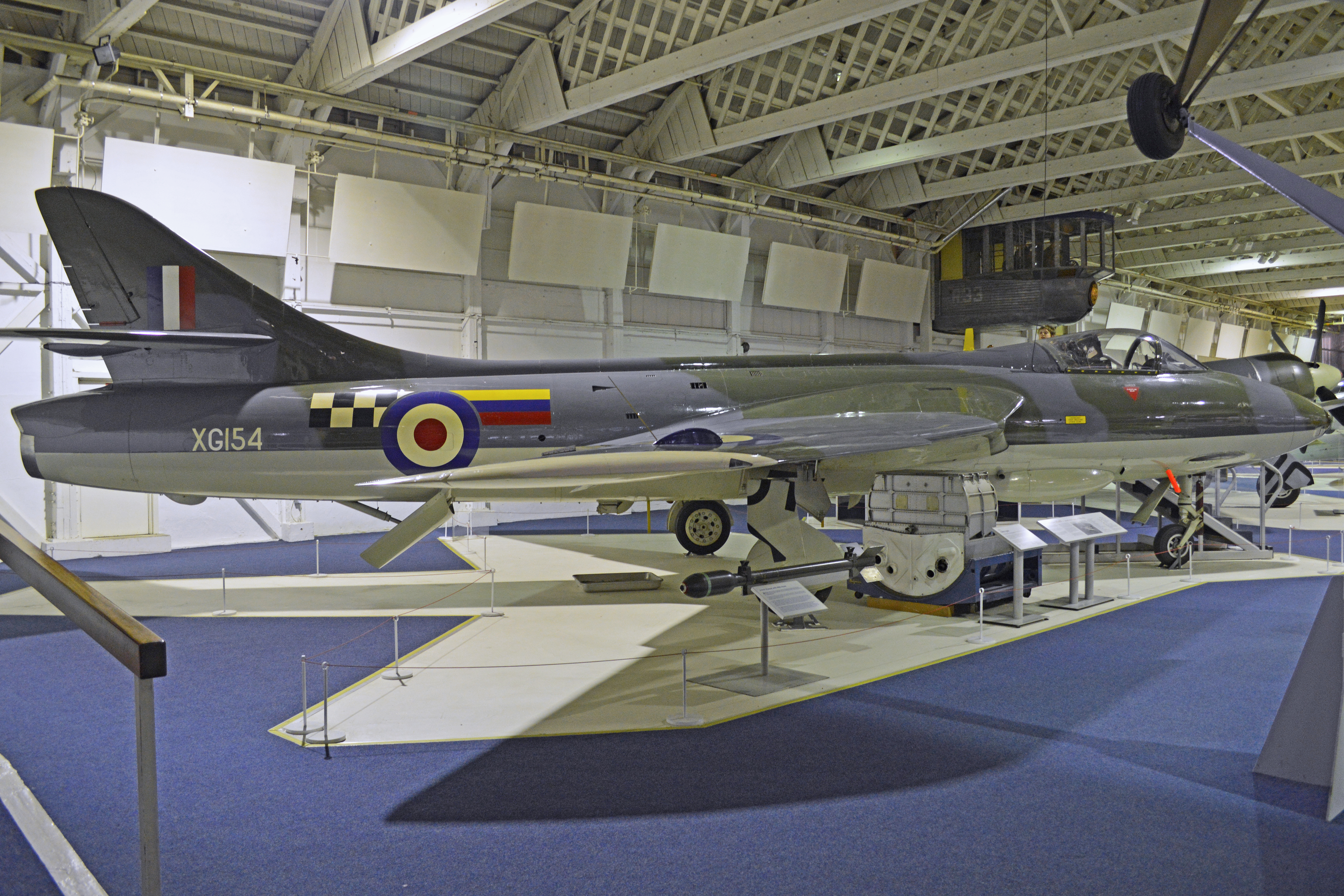
Hawker Hunter FGA.9 XG154 in the colours of the joint No. 8 and 43 Squadron at the Royal Air Force Museum London.

Between April and May 1964, the squadron participated in the Radfan Campaign known as Operation Nutcracker, providing close air support (CAS) for ground troops. On 17 April 1964, Hunter FGA.9 XG136 crashed while carrying out manoeuvres, killing the pilot Flying Officer Herring. In July 1964, the Fighting Cocks had their Hunters pooled with No. 8 Squadron. On 11 August, another Hunter was lost when XE624 suffered an engine flame out shortly after take-off and couldn't be recovered, pilot Fg. Off. Burrows safely ejected. On 18 August, the squadron carried out a strike on the Jabal Fahman mountain where dissidents where supposed to be located. In October 1964 the squadron carried out 15 strikes – 11 in Dhala on the 6th, with the rest in Mudiyah on the 29th. From 8 to 16 October, five pilots from No. 43 (F) Squadron and five from No. 8 Squadron spent a brief deployment with six Hunters at RAF Masirah on Masirah Island, which ended with the loss of Fg. Off. Stephens who was killed after flying into the sea on the return journey to Khormaksar. On 15 November, MEC announced to the squadron that operations in Radfan would be limited to solely providing CAS for the army. Few operational tasks were taken in December 1964, with one of the few sorties being an attack on a gun emplacement at Beihan on the 5th.

In January 1965, sorties increased with an attack being carried out by eight Hunters on 16 January against a dissident camp and supply dump in the Wādī Yahar region. More strikes were carried out on 25, 26 and 29 January. On 11 February, the squadron carried out an 15-ship flypast in the form of a 78 to celebrate No. 78 Squadron being presented its squadron standard. Sorties picked back up in March, with 94 being flown in total, with 80 of these being a response to MiGs from the United Arab Republic Air Force who were entering into Aden's airspace. On 8 May, a pair of Hunters carried out a strike on a dissident position near Al-Khuraybah, with another pair attacking a fort destroying an arms dump in the process. Between 10 and 25 June, the squadron deployed to RAF Masirah to undergo a training exercise which included high level reconnaissance sorties over Sharjah, United Arab Emirates, and Muscat, Oman, as well as practising a hypothetical war situation. On 1 September 1965, 13 sorties were flown which saw multiple strikes being carried out against dissidents in the Jabal Khuder region. Operations were briefly suspended for a month on 25 September after the constitution of the Aden Protectorate was suspended by the High Commissioner of Aden Sir Richard Turnbull. The squadron ended the year with a strike being conducted on 31 December in the Wādī Taym area in support of 45 Commando who requested assistance.

On 16 and 29 January 1966, the Fighting Cocks flew naval co-operation exercises with HMS Eagle, which saw 2 versus 2 combat being carried out against de Havilland Sea Vixens. February saw operations being carried out in support of the Special Air Service, with assistance being given on 1st and top cover being provided on 15th. The squadron celebrated its 50th anniversary on 15 April 1966 with three separate flypasts, the first being an 18-ship in the form of a 43. On 11 May, the squadron conducted a strike on two houses in the village of Al-Mazabah which were reported to hold military supplies. On 31 June, four Hunters from No. 43 (F) Squadron launched an attack on dissidents who were preparing to free political prisoners from Jaʿār prison, while caught by surprise the mission was reported as unsuccessful. 106 sorties were flown in August 1966, the most since June 1964, which primarily included shows of force. On 13 September, three strikes were carried out – one on Wādī Bana and a further two on Wādī Yahar, the attacks were launched as a way of dissuasion towards local dissidents. On 28 October, No. 43 (F) Squadron provided top cover for the Irish Guards, HMS Fearless and Westland Wessex HC.2s of No. 78 Squadron as part of Operation Fate, which saw an assault on Hawf. December saw a decrease in sorties, with only 26 border patrols, three scrambles and three shows of force.

January 1967 saw less than 20 sorties being carried out, however February saw an increase to 53 sorties – including a twelve-ship strike being launched in Wādī Bana on 24 February. On 15 May, No. 43 (F) Squadron carried out a preemptive strike on an arms shipment in Jabal Al Urays to prevent it from being received by a local dissident leader. The squadron carried out another attack on Wādī Bana on 21 June, using RP-3 high explosive rockets and the Hunter's gun pack. August saw the Fighting Cocks flying 101 sorties, this included an attack by eight Hunter FGA.9s on the fort at Shurjan, that had been taken over by the National Liberation Movement, which was struck by 89 rockets and 2,940 rounds of ammunition. Sorties ramped up even further in September, seeing 142 missions being flown in total, with up to five air cover sorties being flown each day from 14 September onwards. On 24 September, six Hunters launched as a show of force to three different forts in Wādī Hadhramaut, which were over 250 miles away from Khormaksar, after the Hadhrami Bedouin Legion called for assistance. October 1967 was the squadron's busiest month while based at RAF Khormaksar with a 159 sorties being flown, with an average of 1 hour 40 minutes each. On 14 October 1967, No. 43 (F) Squadron was formally disbanded, marked by a flypast of six Hunters, however operations officially continued up until November when South Yemen was given independence, with the last No. 43 (F) Squadron sortie being carried out on 9 November against rebels in Kirch.

=== The Phantom Years (1969–1989) ===
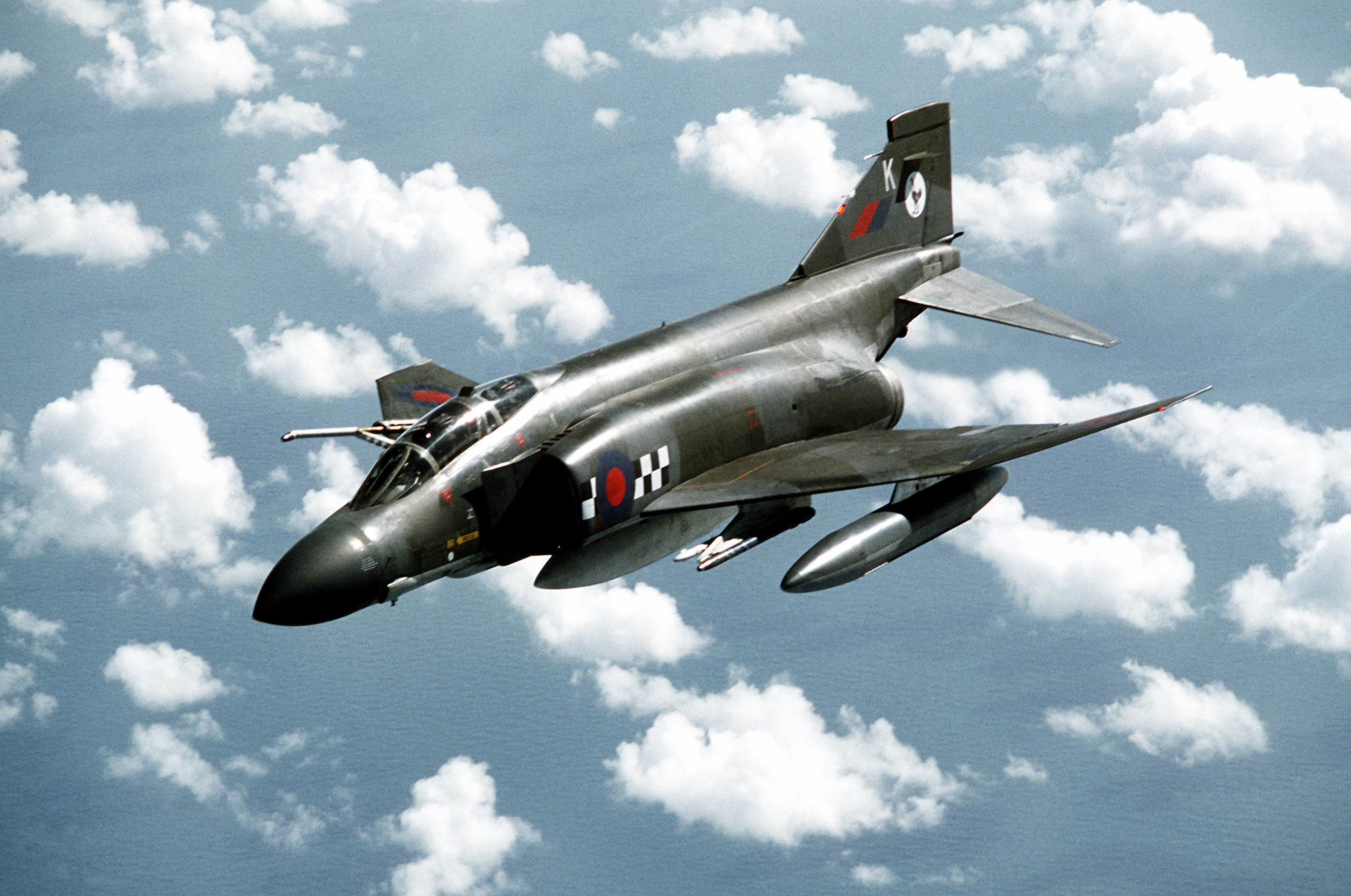
McDonnell Douglas Phantom FG.1 XT875 of No. 43 (Fighter) Squadron, 1980.

No. 43 (Fighter) Squadron received its first McDonnell Douglas Phantom FG.1 (XT874) on 6 June 1969 at RAF Leuchars. The squadron officially reformed at Leuchars on 1 September 1969, operating as part of Northern Quick Reaction Alert (QRA). The Fighting Cocks received the FG.1 (which had an extendable nose wheel oleo strut among a few other differences), as opposed to the FGR.2 operated by other RAF units, due to the cancellation of refit works on HMS Eagle. In November 1970, the squadron deployed eight Phantoms to RAF Luqa, Malta, to participate in Exercise Lime Jug 70, which aimed to improve co-operation between the RAF and Royal Navy.

The Fighting Cocks deployed ten Phantoms to RAF Luqa between February and March 1973 for an Armament Practice Camp (APC), and were later joined by aircraft from HMS Ark Royal. No. 43 (F) Squadron lost its first Phantom on 18 September 1975, when XV580 lost control during a 'Canadian break' manoeuvre and crashed near Forfar, Angus, with both crew ejecting. The squadron deployed once again for an APC at Luqa in November 1975, this time operating alongside Avro Vulcans and Avro Shackletons. Between February and March 1978, No. 43 (F) Squadron participated in another APC at RAF Luqa.

On 9 July 1981, the squadron lost Phantom FG.1 XT866 after an instrument failure on approach to Leuchars which led to a loss of control, both crew safely ejected.

No. 43 (Fighter) Squadron celebrated their 70th anniversary in 1986 by giving Phantom FG.1 XV571 a special commemorative scheme.

The Fighting Cocks briefly operated three Phantom FGR.2s (XV406, XV470 and XV489) between May 1988 and July 1989. No. 43 (F) Squadron's last Phantoms departed Leuchars on 31 July 1989 in preparation for conversion to the Panavia Tornado F.3.

=== The Tornado Years (1989–2009) ===
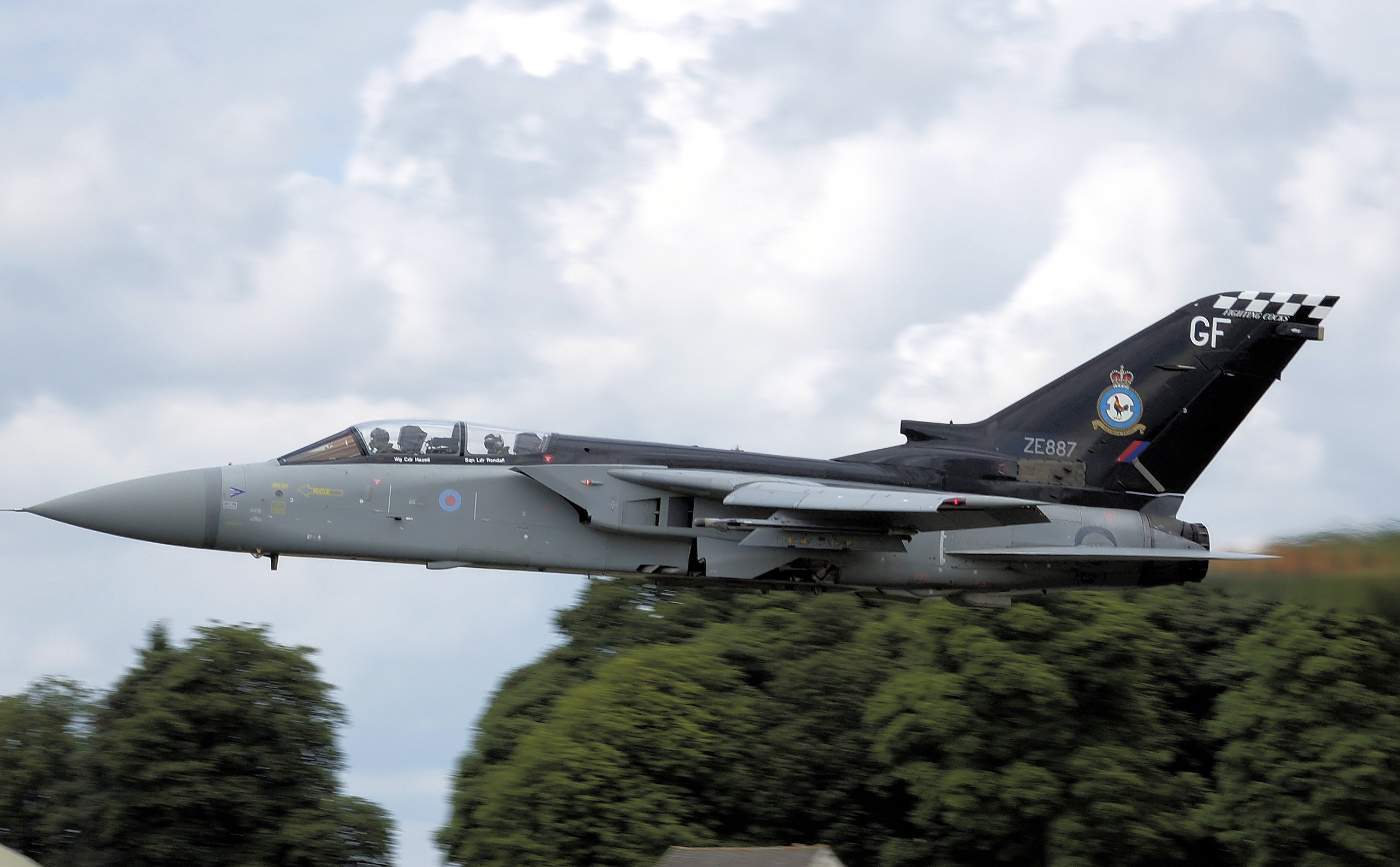
Panavia Tornado F.3 ZE887 of No. 43 (F) Squadron taking off from Kemble Airport, 2008.

The first Tornado F.3s arrived at Leuchars in September 1989. With the Tornado F.3, the squadron participated in the 1991 Gulf War and maintained a presence in the Iraqi no-fly zones. Later, No. 43 (F) Squadron crew and personnel were tasked with QRA duty (short notice air defence 'scrambles'), both in Fife, and in the Falklands as part of No. 1435 Flight and participated in Operation Telic. The squadron was awarded the "Freedom of the City" of Stirling in 2005, the squadron being Stirling's home squadron in the past.

To mark the 90th anniversary of the Fighting Cocks, the squadron's flagship ZG757 received an all gloss black paint scheme, which was later reduced to just a gloss black spine and tail and 90th anniversary emblem on the tail.

In April 2008, the squadron absorbed No. 56 (Reserve) Squadron to perform the role of Tornado F.3 Operational Conversion Unit, with No. 56 Squadron reforming in the ISTAR role.

No. 43 (F) Squadron stood down on 13 July 2009 for the fourth time in its history, with it initially rumoured that it would reform as the third operational Eurofighter Typhoon squadron.

The Squadron Standard, presented in person by HM The Queen at RAF Leuchars on 4 June 1957, was laid up on Sunday 22 May 2016 in the Church of the Holy Rude, Stirling, after it was understood the unit would not be reformed as a Typhoon squadron. The No. 43 Squadron Standard is emblazoned with a black gamecock badge on a field of sky blue and surrounded with the following honours: Western Front 1917–1918, Ypres 1917, Somme 1918, Dunkirk, Battle of Britain 1940, North Africa 1942–1943, Anzio and Nettuno, and France and Germany 1944.

== Notable pilots ==
- Flight Lieutenant Peter Townsend (later Group Captain) was one of three Hurricane pilots of 'B' flight, 43 Squadron, who shot down a Heinkel 111 of 4./KG26 on 3 February 1940, near Whitby, North Yorkshire, the first enemy aircraft to crash on English soil during World War II. His wartime record was 9 aircraft claimed destroyed (and 2 shared), 2 'probables' and 4 damaged.
- Squadron Leader John Badger led the squadron during part of the Battle of Britain and destroyed at least ten aircraft.
- Barrie Heath shot down four German aircraft between 1940 and 1941. After the war he went on to become the chairman of the engineering giant GKN.
- Group Captain John "Paddy" Hemingway, the last surviving pilot of the Battle of Britain, commanded the 43 Squadron in Italy in 1945.
- S/Ldr Eugeniusz Horbaczewski (Dziubek), Polish Air Force, fought with No. 43 Squadron over Malta, Sicily and Italy 1943. On 4 September he shot down an Fw 190 and on 16 September two Fw 190s. In October, he handed over command and returned to Britain.
- Squadron Leader (Acting) Peter Parrott, famous for being a poster boy on a recruitment campaign, and who fought in the Battle of Britain
- Group Captain David Scott: After distinguished service in the operations in Libya, Scott received the only Libya Star presented to a serving officer.
- Group Captain Thomas Dalton-Morgan, DSO, OBE, DFC & Bar, fought with No. 43 Squadron during the Battle of Britain. Credited with 17 confirmed aircraft destroyed before the end of 1943, the true number may be as much as double this as he regularly flew 'off-the-record' while serving later with the USAAF 4th Fighter Group. Dalton-Morgan is credited with six night kills, the most for an RAF pilot in a single-seat fighter aircraft during the war.
- Pilot Officer Hamilton Upton was the highest scoring Canadian flying ace during the Battle of Britain, destroying eleven German aircraft, one of which was shared with three other pilots.
- Flight Lieutenant John Simpson destroyed several German aircraft during the Battle of France and early stages of the Battle of Britain.

== Aircraft operated ==
Aircraft operated include:

- Armstrong Whitworth F.K.3 (May 1916 – August 1916)
- Royal Aircraft Factory B.E.2c (June 1916 – August 1916; November 1916)
- Avro 504 (June 1916 – August 1916; November 1916)
- Bristol Scout (August 1916 – September 1917)
- Sopwith 1½ Strutter (December 1916 – September 1917)
- Sopwith Camel (September 1917 – October 1918)
- Sopwith Snipe (August 1918 – September 1919; July 1925 – May 1926)
- Gloster Gamecock Mk.I (April 1926 – June 1928)
- Armstrong Whitworth Siskin Mk.IIIa (June 1928 – May 1931)
- Hawker Fury Mk.I (May 1931 – January 1939)
- Hawker Hurricane Mk.I (December 1938 – April 1941)
- Hawker Hurricane Mk.IIa (April 1941 – August 1942)
- Hawker Hurricane Mk.IIb (April 1941 – August 1942)
- Hawker Hurricane Mk.IIc (December 1941 – August 1942; November 1942 – March 1943)
- Supermarine Spitfire Mk.Vc (March 1943 – January 1944)
- Supermarine Spitfire Mk.IX (August 1943 – May 1947)
- Supermarine Spitfire Mk.VIII (August 1944 – November 1944)
- Gloster Meteor F.4 (February 1949 – September 1954)
- Gloster Meteor F.8 (September 1950 – September 1954)
- Hawker Hunter F.1 (July 1954 – November 1956)
- Hawker Hunter F.4 (February 1956 – July 1958)
- Hawker Hunter F.6 (November 1956 – December 1956; January 1958 – July 1960)
- Hawker Hunter FGA.9 (May 1960 – November 1967)
- McDonnell Douglas Phantom FG.1 (September 1969 – July 1989)
- McDonnell Douglas Phantom FGR.2 (May 1988 – July 1989)
- Panavia Tornado F.3 (September 1989 – June 2009)
