= South African Air Force =

Branch of the South African National Defence Force

- Afrikaans: Suid-Afrikaanse Lugmag
- Emblem of the South African Air Force
- Founded: 1 February 1920; 106 years ago
- Country: South Africa
- Type: Air force
- Role: Aerial warfare
- Size: 12,815 active personnel 1000 reserve personnel 250+ aircraft (see List of aircraft of the South African Air Force)
- Part of: South African National Defence Force
- Garrison/HQ: Pretoria
- Mottos: Latin: Per aspera ad astra "Through adversity to the stars"
- Engagements: World War I; World War II; East African Campaign; North African Campaign; Battle of Madagascar; Italian Campaign; Balkan Campaign; Greek Civil War; Korean War; South African Border War; Angolan Bush War
- Website: af.mil.za

Commanders
- Commander-in-Chief: President Cyril Ramaphosa
- Chief of the Air Force: Lieutenant general Carl Moatshe
- Sergeant Major of the Air Force: Colin Stanton-Jones

Insignia
- Roundel

- Fin flash

- Ensign

Aircraft flown
- Attack: BAE Hawk, Milkor 380
- Electronic warfare: Oryx EW, C-47TP ELINT, Cessna Caravan
- Fighter: JAS 39 Gripen
- Attack helicopter: Rooivalk
- Multirole helicopter: Atlas Oryx, Lynx 300
- Trainer helicopter: Agusta A109
- Utility helicopter: Agusta A109, BK 117
- Patrol: C-47TP
- Reconnaissance: Cessna Caravan, Milkor 380
- Trainer: Pilatus PC-7, BAE Hawk
- Transport: C-130, CASA C.212, Cessna Caravan

The South African Air Force (SAAF) is the air warfare branch of the South African National Defence Force, with its headquarters in Pretoria. It was established on 1 February 1920 and is recognised as the second-oldest independent air force in the world after the British Royal Air Force. The SAAF saw service in the Second World War and the Korean War. From 1966, it was heavily involved in providing air support during the Border War in Angola, South-West Africa, and Rhodesia. As the conflict escalated, the SAAF expanded into one of Africa's largest and most capable air forces, culminating in fighter engagements against Angolan aircraft during the late 1980s to maintain tactical air superiority.

By the end of the Border War in 1990, the SAAF had reached its largest size, operating more than 800 aircraft. The post-war period saw a major drawdown driven by the cessation of hostilities, the end of apartheid, the lifting of international sanctions, the dismantlement of South Africa's nuclear weapons programme, and economic constraints. The Air Force subsequently retired more than 400 aircraft, closed more than a dozen squadrons and two air bases, and substantially reduced its force structure. Despite this, the SAAF remains responsible for protecting South Africa's national airspace while maintaining air-defence, air mobility, maritime patrol and combat support capabilities in support of national and regional security.

== History ==
=== First World War ===
After a visit to observe the 1912 military manoeuvres in Europe, Brig. Gen. C.F. Beyers (who was then Commandant-General of the Defence Force) gave an extremely positive report on the future use of aircraft for military purposes to General Smuts. Smuts initiated an arrangement with private fliers in the Cape and established a flying school at Alexandersfontein (Note: Alexandersfontein is at 28.8101°S 24.802°E) near Kimberley, known as the Paterson Aviation Syndicate School, to train pilots for the proposed South African Aviation Corps. Flying training commenced in 1913 with students who excelled on the course being sent to the Central Flying School at Upavon in Great Britain for further training. The first South African military pilot qualified on 2 June 1914.

On the outbreak of the First World War, the Union Defence Force had realised the urgent need for air support which brought about the establishment of the South African Aviation Corps (SAAC) on 29 January 1915. Aircraft were purchased from France (Henri Farman F-27) while the building of an airfield at Walvis Bay commenced in earnest in order to support operations against German forces in German South West Africa. By June 1915 the SAAC was deployed to its first operational airfield at Karibib in German South West Africa in support of Gen. Botha's South African ground forces. The SAAC flew reconnaissance and leaflet dropping missions from Karibib and later from Omaruru, where improvised bombing missions were added when pilots started dropping hand grenades and rudimentary bombs by hand. On 9 July 1915, the German forces capitulated and most of the pilots and aircraft of the SAAC were sent to Britain in support of the Imperial war effort.

Although the SAAC remained active, its activities were limited to ground training at the Cape Town Drill Hall, while the pilots who had been detached to the Royal Flying Corps (RFC) were grouped to form No. 26 Squadron RFC and later becoming an independent squadron on 8 October 1915. No. 26 Squadron was equipped with Henri Farman F-27's and B.E.2c's and was shipped to Kenya in support of the war effort in German East Africa, landing in Mombasa on 31 January 1916. The squadron flew reconnaissance and observer missions throughout the campaign until February 1918 when the squadron returned to the UK via Cape Town and arrived at Blandford Camp on 8 July 1918 and was disbanded the same day. While the SAAC were engaged in German South West Africa and 26 Sqdn RFC in East Africa, many South Africans traveled to the United Kingdom to enlist with the Royal Flying Corps. The number of South Africans in the RFC eventually reached approximately 3,000 men and suffered 260 active-duty fatalities over the Somme during the war. Forty-six pilots became fighter aces.

=== Founding and the inter-war period ===
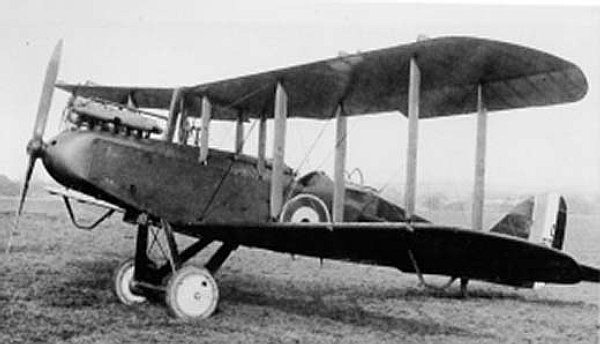
de Havilland/Airco DH.9: 49 of these aircraft were donated to South Africa as part of the Imperial Gift

On conclusion of the First World War, the British Government donated surplus aircraft plus spares and sufficient equipment to provide the nucleus of a fledgling air force to each of its Dominions. As part of this donation, which was to become known as the Imperial Gift, South Africa received a total of 113 aircraft from both the British Government (100 aircraft) as well as from other sources (13 aircraft). (Note: 30x Avro 504K's; 22x Royal Aircraft Factory S.E.5a's; 49x De Havilland DH.9's (one of which was donated by the City of Birmingham); 10x De Havilland DH.4's (donated by the Overseas Club of London); 2x Royal Aircraft Factory B.E.2e's (donated by Maj. Miller Tour))

On 1 February 1920 Colonel Pierre van Ryneveld was appointed as the Director Air Service with the task of forming an air force, the date is used to mark the founding of the South African Air Force. In December 1920 the South African National insignia was added to aircraft for the first time. An Orange, Green, Red and Blue roundel was added to an Avro 504K for trial purposes but the colours were found to be unsuitable and were replaced with a Green, Red, Lemon, Yellow and Blue roundel in December 1921. These colours remained until 1927 when they were replaced with the Orange, White and Blue roundels.

The first operational deployment of the newly formed Air Force was to quell internal dissent, when in 1922 a miner's strike on the Johannesburg gold mines turned violent and led to the declaration of martial law. 1 Squadron was called to fly reconnaissance missions and to bombard the strikers' positions. Sorties in support of the police amounted to 127 flight hours between 10 and 15 March and this inauspicious start for the SAAF led to two pilot losses, two wounded and two aircraft lost to ground fire. The SAAF was again deployed to suppress the Bondelzwart Rebellion at Kalkfontein between 29 May and 3 July 1922.

=== Second World War ===
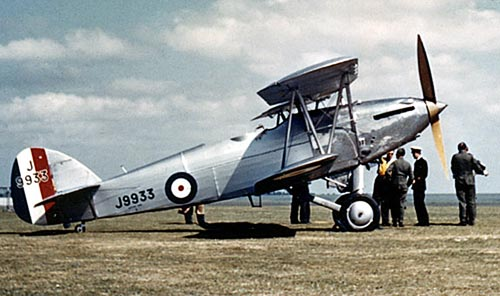
A Hawker Hart, one of the earliest bombers for South Africa

At the outbreak of the Second World War, South Africa had no naval vessels and the UDF's first priority was to ensure the safety of the South African coastal waters as well as the strategically important Cape sea-route. For maritime patrol operations, the SAAF took over all 29 passenger aircraft of South African Airways: 18 Junkers Ju 86Z-ls for maritime patrols and eleven Junkers Ju 52s for transport purposes. SAAF maritime patrols commenced on 21 September 1939 with 16 Squadron flying three JU-86Z's from Walvis Bay. had been established, eventually consisting of 6, 10, 22, 23, 25, 27 and 29 Squadrons.

By the end of the Second World War in August 1945, SAAF aircraft (in conjunction with British and Dutch aircraft stationed in South Africa) had intercepted 17 enemy ships, assisted in the rescue of 437 survivors of sunken ships, attacked 26 of the 36 enemy submarines that operated around the South African coast, and flown 15,000 coastal patrol sorties.

==== East Africa ====
In December 1939, The Duke of Aosta had sent a report to Mussolini recording the state of chronic unpreparedness of the Allied Forces in East Africa. The collapse of France in 1940 had prompted Mussolini to join the war on the side of the Axis and as a result, air force elements were moved to forward positions in occupied Ethiopia to mount air attacks on Allied forces before they could be re-inforced. These deployments prompted Allied action and on 13 May 1940, 1 Squadron pilots were sent to Cairo to take delivery of 18 Gloster Gladiators and to fly them south to Kenya, for operations in East Africa. 11 Squadron, equipped with Hawker Hartebeests, followed to Nairobi on 19 May 1940 and were joined by the Junkers Ju 86s of 12 Squadron on 22 May 1940.

The Kingdom of Italy declared war on 10 June 1940 and on the following day, the Ju 86s of 12 Squadron led the first air attack by the SAAF in the Second World War. During the campaign, numerous SAAF aircraft were involved in air combat with the Italian Regia Aeronautica and provided air support to South African and Allied forces in the ground war. By December 1940, ten SAAF squadrons plus 34 Flight, with a total of 94 aircraft, were operational in East Africa (1 Squadron, 2 Squadron, 3 Squadron, 11 Squadron, 12 Squadron, 14 Squadron, 40 Squadron, 41 Squadron, 50 Squadron and 60 Squadron). During this campaign, the SAAF formed a Close Support Flight of four Gladiators and four Hartebeests, with an autonomous air force commander operating with the land forces. This was the precursor of the Desert Air Force/Tactical Air Force "cab-rank" technique which were used extensively for close air support during 1943–1945. The last air combat took place on 29 October and the Italian forces surrendered on 27 November 1941. A reduced SAAF presence was maintained in East Africa for coastal patrols until May 1943.

==== Western Desert and North Africa ====
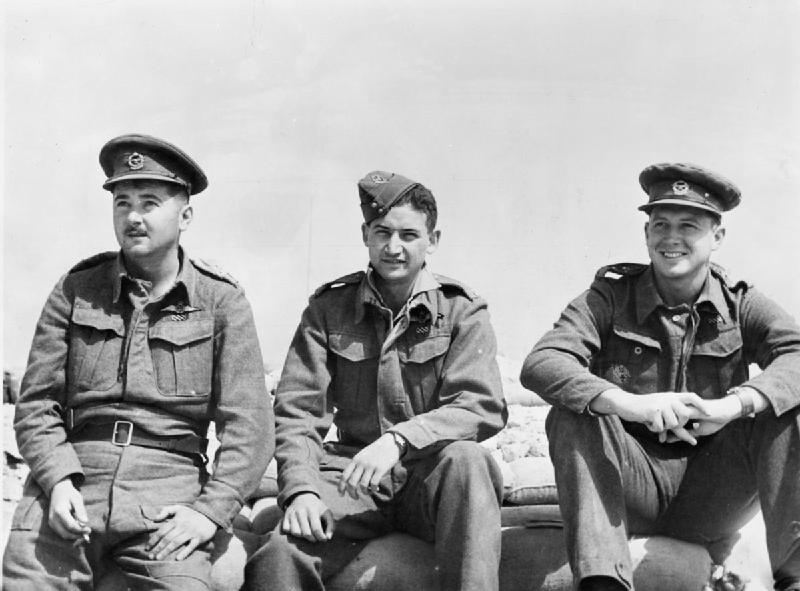
Lt. Robin Pare (left), squadron commander Major John "Jack" Frost (centre), who was the highest scoring ace in the SAAF during the Second World War, and Capt. Andrew Duncan (right) of 5 Squadron SAAF March/April 1942

SAAF fighter, bomber, and reconnaissance squadrons played a key role in the Western Desert and North African campaigns from 1941 to 1943. One memorable feat was the Boston bombers of 12 and 24 Squadrons dropping hundreds of tons of bombs on Axis forces pushing the Eighth Army back towards Egypt during the "Gazala Gallop" in mid-1942. SAAF bombers continually harassed retreating forces towards the Tunisian border after the Second Battle of El Alamein; the South African fighters of No. 223 Wing RAF helped the Desert Air Force gain air superiority over Axis air forces. Between April 1941 and May 1943, the eleven SAAF squadrons (Note: SAAF elements in the Western Desert Air Force as at 26 May 1942: (A.) Assigned to air HQ: (A.1.) 15 Sqn: Fighter/Recon (Amiriya with one detachment at Kufra), Blenheim IVF. (A.2.) 40 Sqn: Recon (El Adem), Hurricane I / Tomahawk. (A.3.) 60 Sqn: Recon (Sidi Barrani) Marylands. (B.) No. 3 Wing SAAF (Baheira): (B.1.) 12 Sqn: Light Bomber (Baheira), Boston III's; (B.2.) 24 Sqn: Light Bomber (Baheira), Baltimore I; (B.3.) No. 223 RAF Light Bomber (Baheira) Baltimore I. (C.) No. 223 Wing RAF (Gambut). (C.1.) 4 Sqn: Fighter (Gambut), Tomahawks. (C.2.) 5 Sqn: Fighter (Gambut), Tomahawks. (C.3.) 2 Sqn: Fighter (Gambut), Kittyhawk I.) flew 33,991 sorties and destroyed 342 enemy aircraft.

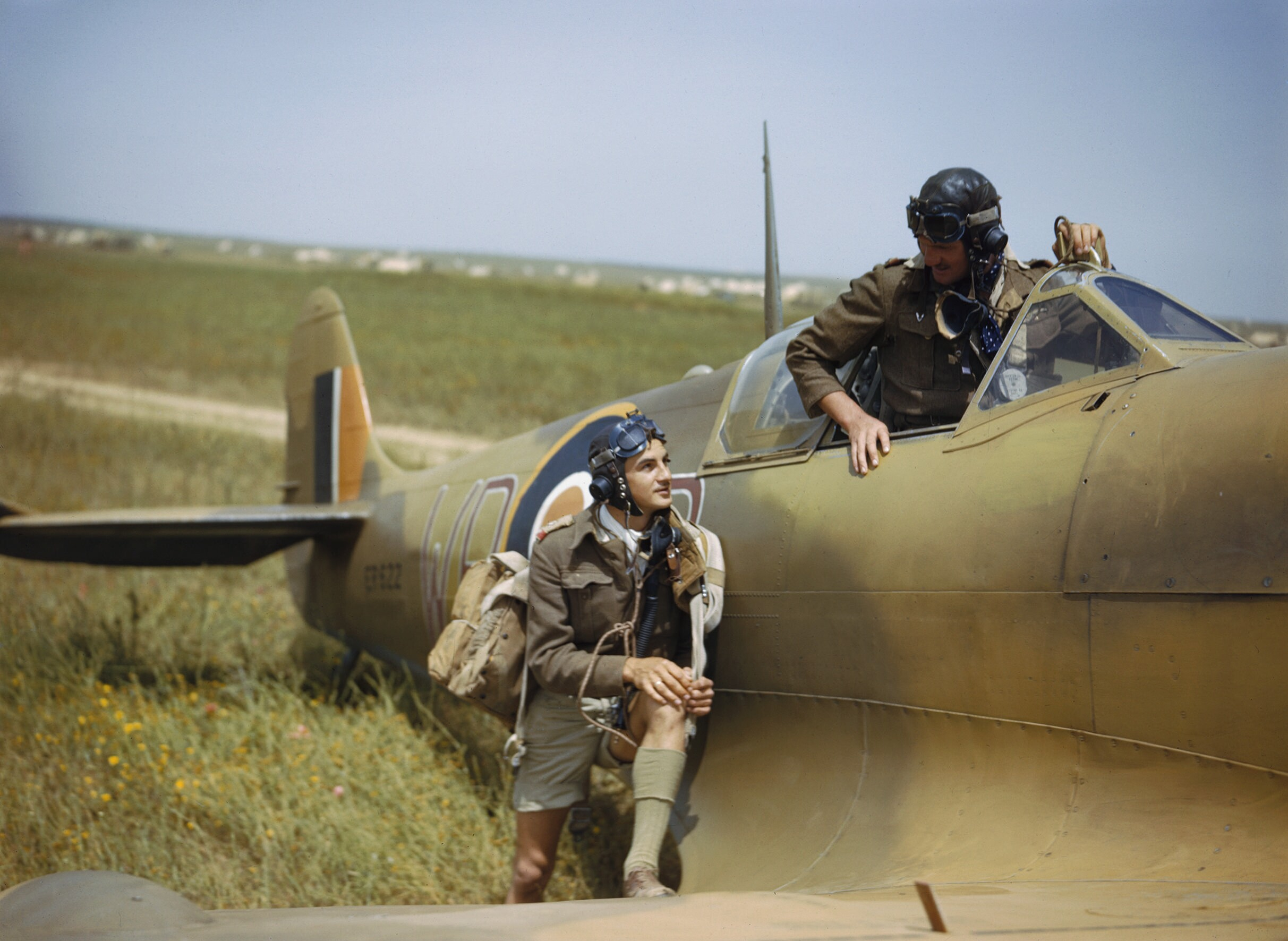
Supermarine Spitfire pilots of 40 Squadron, South African Air Force, at Gabes in Tunisia, April 1943

Conditions were however not ideal and pilots and crew were required to operate under critical conditions at times. Pilots were frequently sent home to the Union after gaining experience and did not return for many months, after which conditions in the desert had changed significantly and they were required to regain experience on different aircraft, different tactics and operations from different bases. There were cases where experienced fighter pilots were sent back to the Western Desert as bomber pilots for their second tour – compounding the lack of continuity and experience. The South Africans did however command the respect of their German adversaries.

The South Africans had the distinction of dropping the first and last bombs in the African conflict – the first being on 11 June 1940 on Moyale in Ethiopia and the last being on the Italian 1st Army in Tunisia. The SAAF also produced a number of SAAF Second World War air aces in the process, including John Frost and Marmaduke Pattle.

==== Madagascar ====
In fear of Japanese occupation and subsequent operations in the Indian Ocean in close proximity to South African sea lanes, Field Marshal Smuts encouraged the preemptive Allied occupation of the island of Madagascar. After much debate and further encouragement by General de Gaulle (who was urging for a Free French operation against Madagascar), Churchill and the Chiefs of Staff agreed to an invasion by means of a strong fleet and adequate air support. In March and April 1942, the SAAF had been conducting reconnaissance flights over Diego-Suarez and 32, 36 and 37 Coastal Flights (Note: These three Maritime Reconnaissance Flights were later combined to form 16 Squadron: 32 Flight consisting of 5 Glenn Martin Maryland Bombers (Maj D Meaker, Officer Commanding); 36 Flight with 6 Bristol Beaufort Bombers (Maj J Clayton, Officer Commanding); 37 Flight with 1 Maryland and 5 Beauforts (Maj K Jones, Officer Commanding)) were withdrawn from South African maritime patrol operations and sent to Lindi on the Indian Ocean coast of Tanzania, with an additional eleven Bristol Beauforts and six Martin Marylands to provide ongoing reconnaissance and close air support for the planned operation – to be known as Operation Ironclad.

During the amphibious / air assault carried out by the Royal Navy and Air Force on 5 May, the Vichy French Air Force consisting mainly of Morane fighters and Potez bombers had attacked the Allied fleet but had been neutralised by the Fleet Air Arm aircraft from the two aircraft carriers. Those remaining aircraft not destroyed were withdrawn by the French and flown south to other airfields on the island. Once the main airfield at Arrachart aerodrome in Diego-Suarez had been secured (13 May 1942), the SAAF Air Component flew from Lindi to Arrachart. The air component consisted of thirty-four aircraft (6 Marylands, 11 Beaufort Bombers, 12 Lockheed Lodestars and 6 Ju 52's transports). By September 1942, the South African ground forces committed to Ironclad had been party to the capturing the southern half of Madagascar as well as the small island of Nossi Be with the SAAF air component supporting these operations. During the campaign which ended with an armistice on 4 November 1942, SAAF aircraft flew a total of 401 sorties with one pilot killed in action, one killed in an accident and one succumbing to disease. Seven aircraft were lost, only one as a result of enemy action.

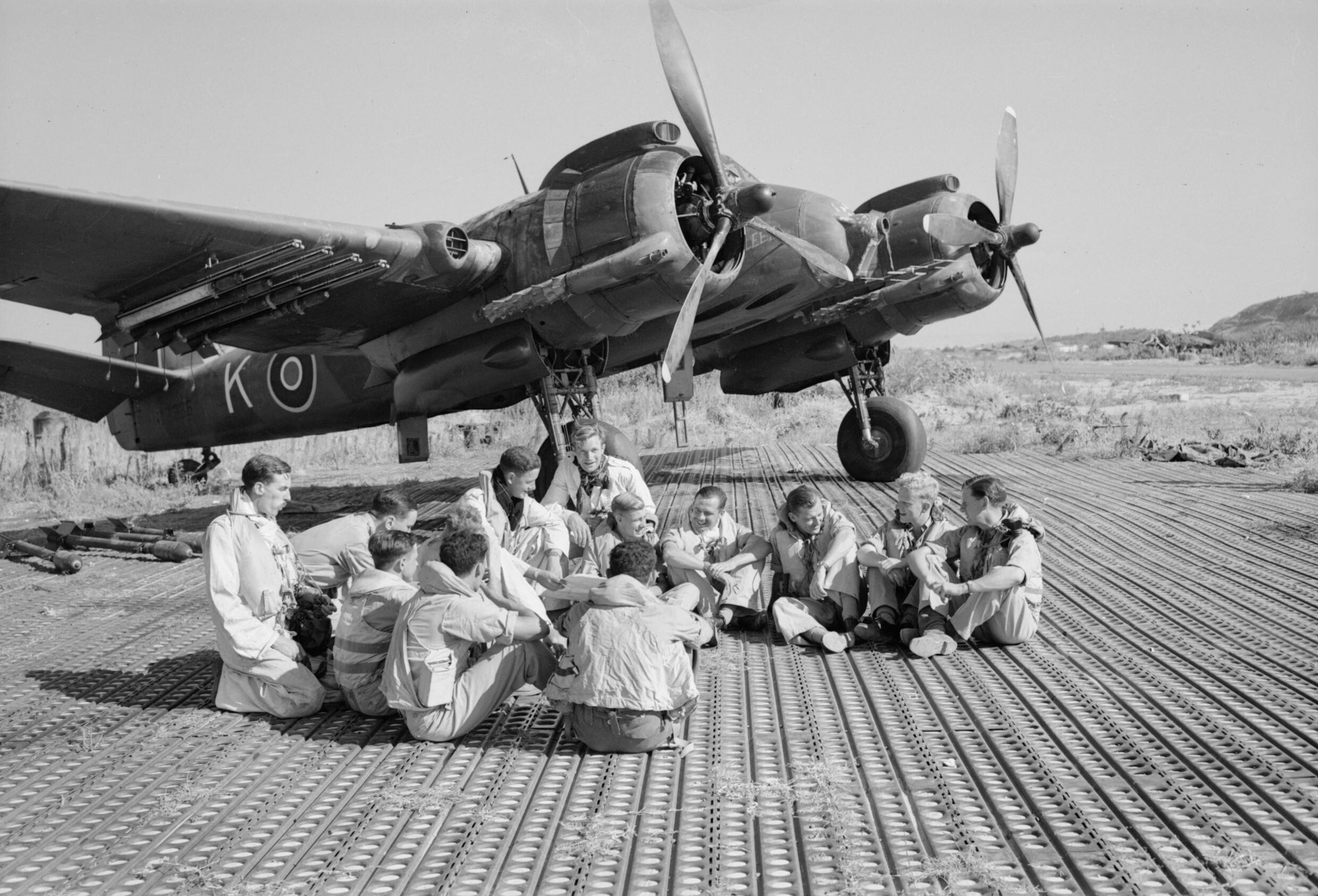
A Bristol Beaufighter, in Italy August 1944.

==== Sicilian and Italian campaigns ====
By the end of May 1943, the SAAF had two Wings and sixteen squadrons in the Middle East and North Africa with 8,000 men. With the end of the North African campaign, the SAAF role underwent change – becoming more active in fighter bomber, bomber and PR operations as opposed to the fighter role performed in the desert.

Five SAAF squadrons were designated to support the July 1943 invasion of Sicily – 1 Squadron operated combat air patrols over the beaches for the Operation Husky landings while 2, 4 and 5 Squadrons provided fighter bomber support during the Sicilian campaign. 30 Squadron (flying as No. 223 Squadron RAF during the campaign) provided light bomber support from Malta and 60 Squadron was responsible for photo reconnaissance flights in support of all Allied forces on the island. After successfully invading the island, a further three squadrons were moved to Sicily and the eight squadrons on the island were tasked with supporting the invasion of Italy: 12 and 24 Squadrons were responsible for medium bomber missions to "soften up" the enemy prior to the invasion while 40 Sqn was responsible for tactical photo-reconnaissance. 1 Squadron provided fighter cover for the 3 September 1943 landings while 2 and 4 Squadrons were responsible for bomber escort.

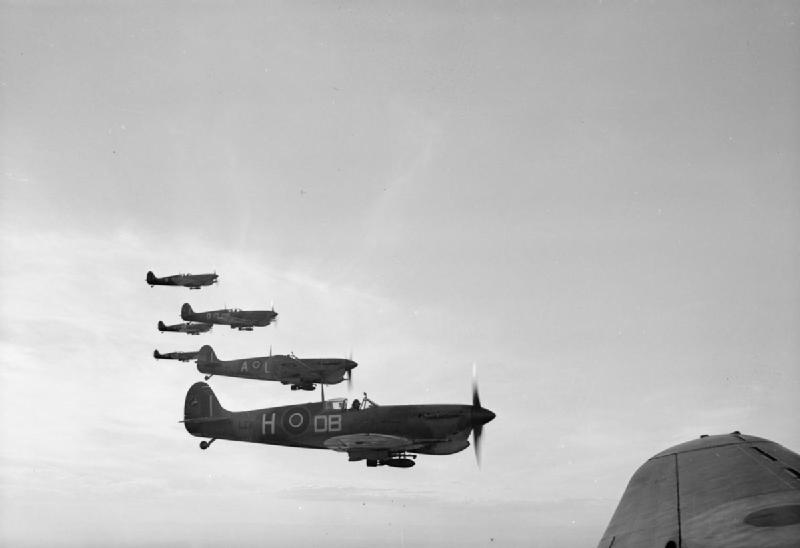
Supermarine Spitfire Mark VCs of 2 Squadron SAAF based at Palata, Italy

The South African Air Force participated in the Allied campaigns in the following theaters:

- Italy (1943–45): 2, 3 7 and 8 Wings fought in operations to liberate Italy from German occupation.
- Yugoslavia (1943–44): 7 Wing and 8 Wing supported partisan operations against German occupation forces.
- Balkans (1944–45): Some squadrons served with the Balkan Air Force in operations over Hungary, Romania and Albania.
- Warsaw (1944): 2 Wing air-supplied Warsaw during Warsaw Uprising.
- Greece (1944): 2 Wing supported British operations to liberate Greece and suppress the communist coup.

==== Other theatres ====
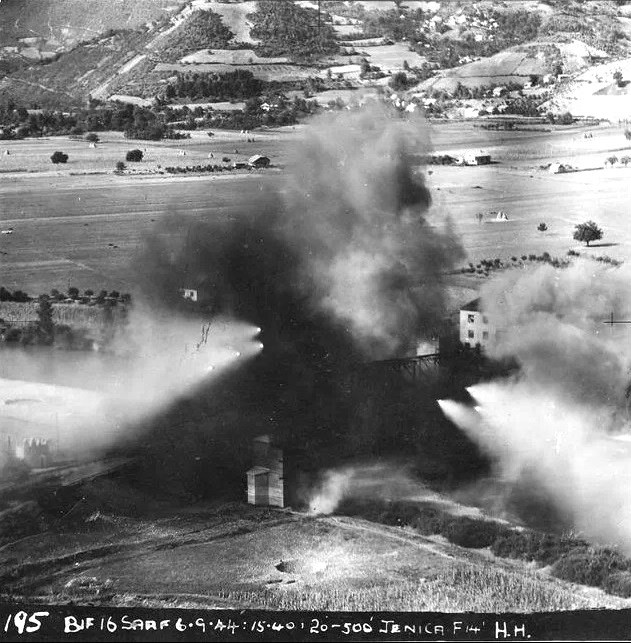
On 6 September 1944 16th SAAF Squadron bombed, among other places, Zenica bridge "Pehare", during Balkans campaign led from Italy

- Atlantic (1943–45): Two squadrons patrolled convoy routes off West Africa and Gibraltar. (26 Squadron SAAF, Vickers Wellington XI's, Takoradi, Gold Coast, West Africa)
- France (1944): A detachment took part in the Franco-American invasion of southern France.
- Bosnia and Herzegovina, Croatia, Serbia, Slovenia, etc. (1944–45): 16th South African Air Force Squadron, stationed in Italy, made dozens of air strikes against German forces and collaborators in then Croatia, Serbia, Slovenia, Bosnia and Herzegovina, etc. during 1944 and 1945. On 6 September 1944, the 16th Squadron bombed Zenica, focusing on bridges.

==== Mobile Air Force Depot ====
The Mobile Air Force Depot (MAFD) was based in Pretoria. Its role during the Second World War was as a location where Air Crew could be stationed, on stand-by, prior to being posted to a more active squadron.

=== Berlin airlift ===
Post-war, the SAAF also took part in the Berlin airlift of 1948 with 20 aircrews flying Royal Air Force Dakotas. 4,133 tons of supplies were carried in 1,240 missions flown.

=== Korean War ===
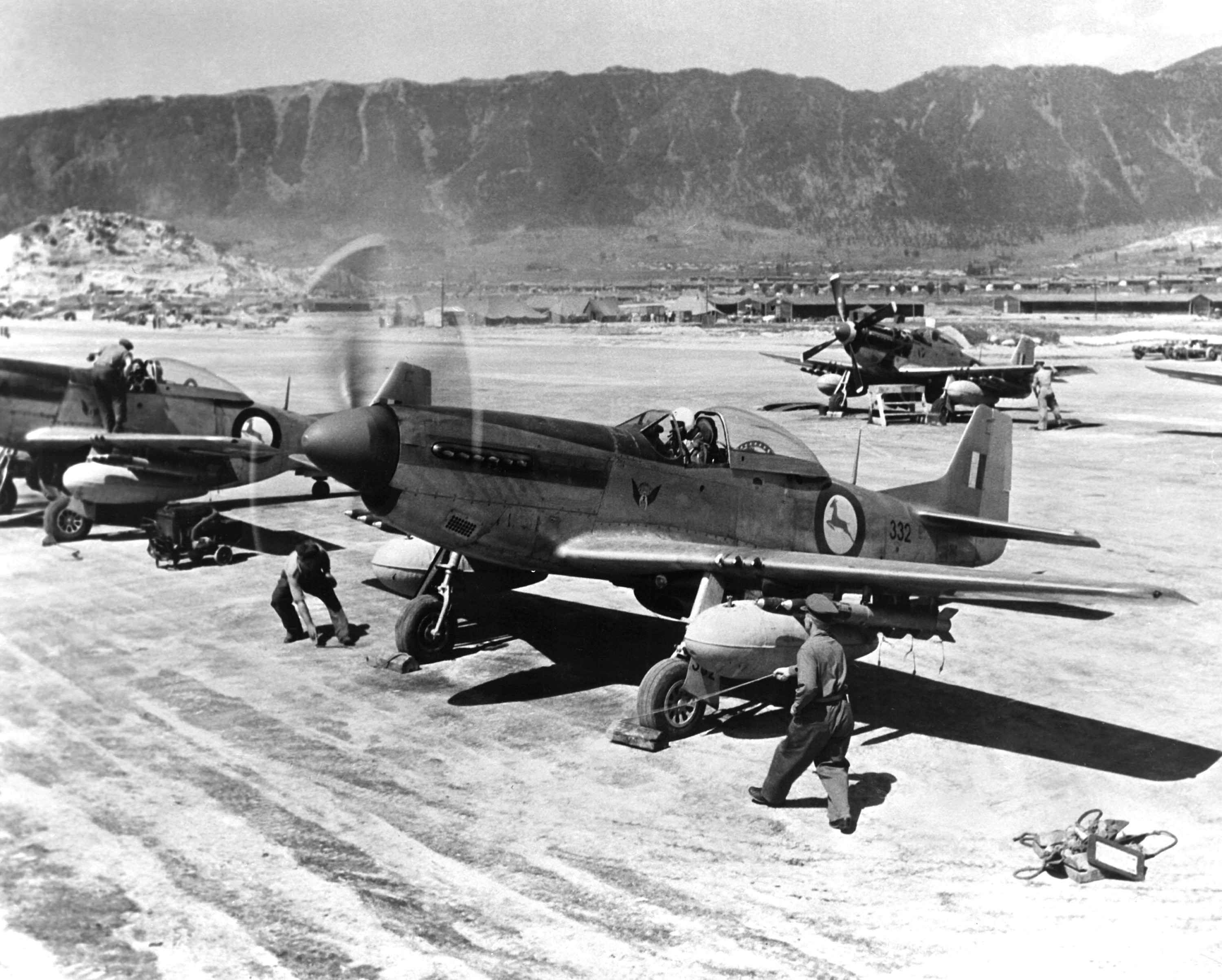
2 Squadron F51 Mustangs in Korea

At the outbreak of the Korean War, the United Nations Security Council passed a resolution calling for the withdrawal of North Korean forces in South Korea. A request was also made to all UN members for assistance. After a special Cabinet meeting on 20 July 1950 the Union Government announced that due to the long distance between South Africa and Korea, direct ground-based military participation in the conflict was impractical and unrealistic but that a SAAF fighter squadron would be made available to the UN effort. The 50 officers and 157 other ranks of 2 Sqn SAAF sailed from Durban on 26 September 1950 – they had been selected from 1,426 members of the Permanent Force who had initially volunteered for service. This initial contingent was commanded by Cmdt S. van Breda Theron DSO, DFC, AFC and included many World War II SAAF veterans. The squadron was moved to Johnson Air Base near Tokyo on 25 September 1950 for conversion training on the F-51D Mustangs supplied by the US Air Force.

On completion of conversion training, the squadron was deployed as one of the four USAF 18th Fighter-Bomber Wing squadrons and on 16 November 1950 an advance detachment consisting of 13 officers and 21 other ranks (including the Squadron Commander and his four Flight Commanders who made the crossing in their own F-51D Mustangs) left Japan for Pusan East (K-9) Air Base within the Pusan Perimeter in Korea to fly with the USAF pilots in order to familiarise themselves with the local operational conditions. On the morning of 19 November 1950, Cmdt Theron and Capt G.B. Lipawsky took off with two USAF pilots to fly the first SAAF combat sorties of the Korean War from K-9 and K-24 airfields at Pyongyang.

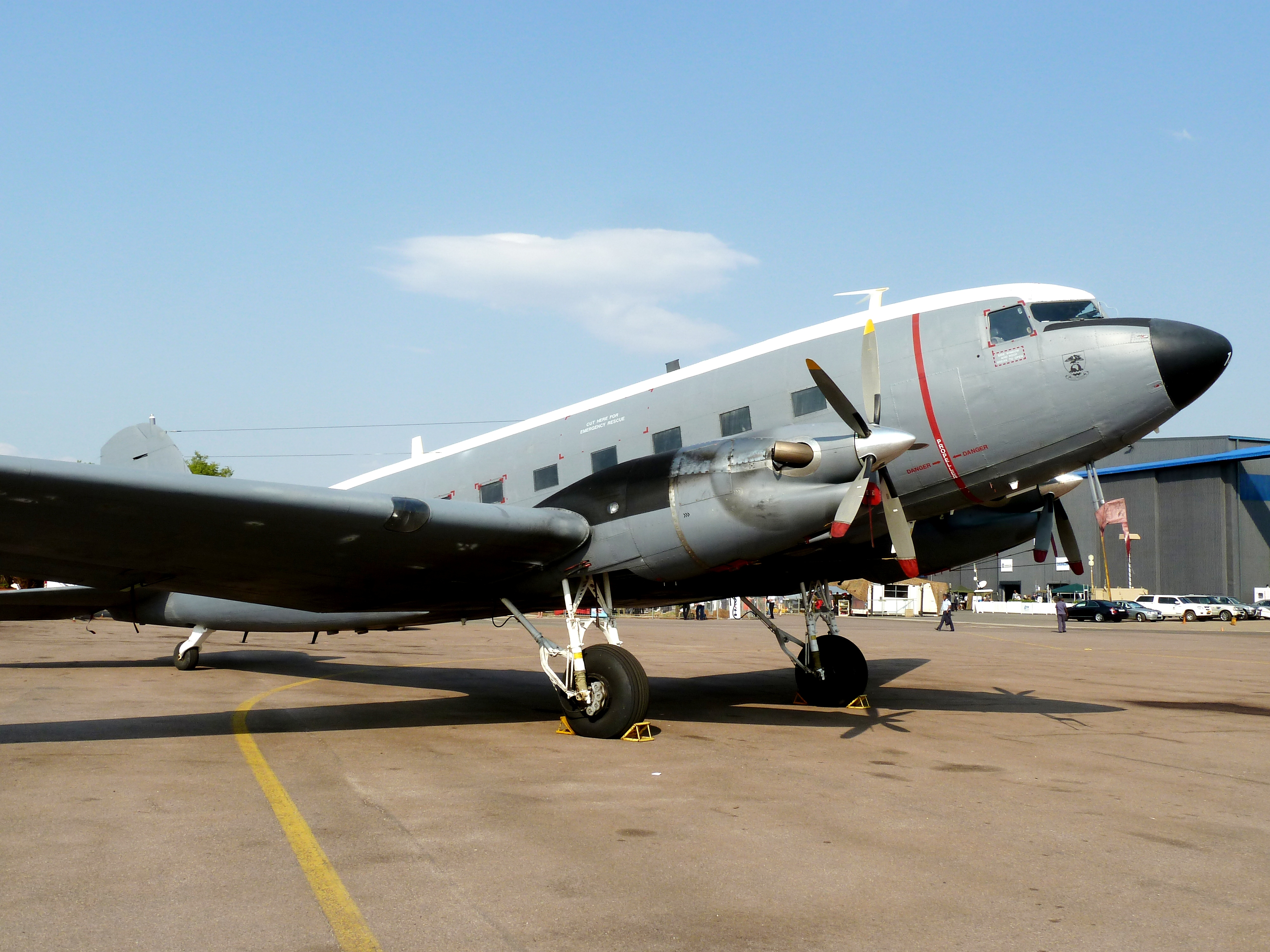
SAAF C47 Turbo prop Dakota

On 30 November the squadron was moved further south to K-13 airfield due to North Korean and Chinese advances. It was again moved even further south after the UN forces lost additional ground to the North Koreans to K-10 airfield situated on the coast close to the town of Chinhae. This was to be the squadron's permanent base for the duration of their first Korean deployment. During this period (while equipped with F-51D Mustangs) the squadron flew 10,373 sorties and lost 74 aircraft out of the total 95 allocated. Twelve pilots were killed in action, 30 missing and four wounded.

In January 1953 the squadron returned to Japan for conversion to the USAF F-86F Sabre fighter-bombers. The first Sabre mission was flown on 16 March 1953 from the K-55 airfield in South Korea, being the first SAAF jet mission flown. 2 squadron was led by ace pilot, Major Jean de Wet from AFB Langebaanweg. The squadron was tasked with fighter sweeps along the Yalu and Chong-Chong rivers as well as close air support attack missions. The squadron flew 2,032 sorties in the Sabres losing four out of the 22 aircraft supplied.

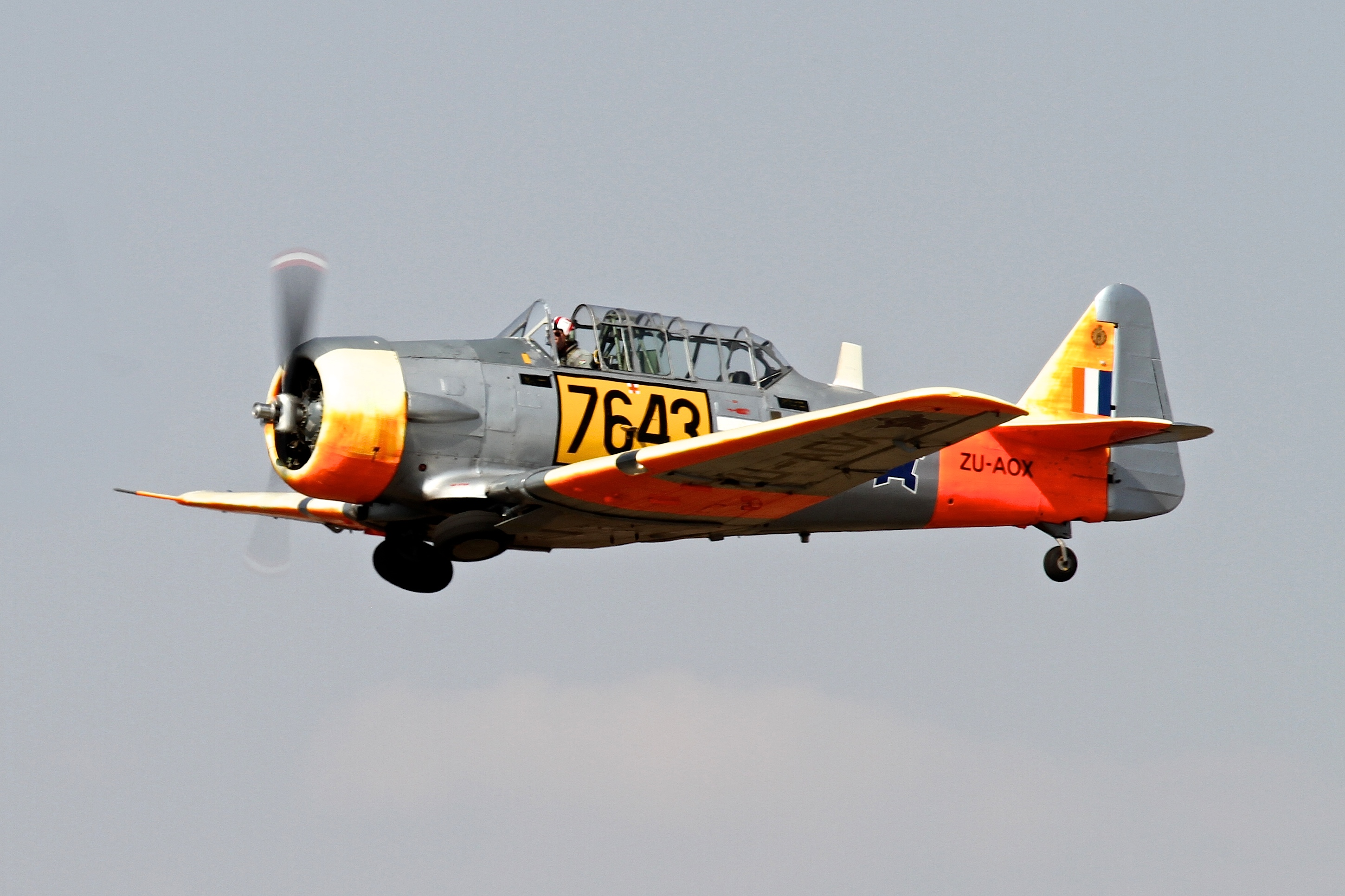
SAAF Harvard trainer

The war ended on 27 July 1953, when the Korean Armistice Agreement was signed. During the first phase of the war, the main task of the squadron Mustangs was the interdiction of enemy supply routes which not only accounted for approximately 61.45% of SAAF combat sorties, but which reached an early peak from January to May 1951 (78% and 82%). A typical interdiction mission was an armed reconnaissance patrol usually undertaken by flights of two or four aircraft armed with two napalm bombs, 127 mm rockets and 12.7 mm machine guns. Later, after the introduction of the Sabres, the squadron was also called on to provide counter-air missions flying as fighter sweeps and interceptions against MiG-15's, but interdiction and close air support remained the primary mission. Losses were 34 SAAF pilots killed, eight taken prisoner (including the future Chief of the Air Force, General D Earp) with 74 Mustangs and 4 Sabres lost. Pilots and men of the squadron received a total of 797 medals including 2 Silver Stars, the highest US military award given to foreigners, 3 Legions of Merit, 55 Distinguished Flying Crosses and 40 Bronze Stars. In recognition of their association with 2 Squadron, the OC of 18th Fighter-Bomber Wing issued a policy directive "that all retreat ceremonies shall be preceded by the introductory bars of the South African national anthem. All personnel will render the honour to this anthem as our own."

On conclusion of hostilities, the Sabres were returned to the USAF and the squadron returned to South Africa in October 1953. During this period, the Union Defence Forces were reorganised into individual services and the SAAF became an arm of service in its own right, under an Air Chief of Staff (who was renamed "Chief of the Air Force" in 1966). It adopted a blue uniform, to replace the army khaki it had previously worn.

=== Rhodesian Bush War ===
The SAAF loaned aircraft and flew occasional covert reconnaissance, transport and combat sorties in support of the Royal Rhodesian Air Force (RRAF; renamed in 1970 as the Rhodesian Air Force (RhAF)) and the rest of the Rhodesian Security Forces from 1966 onwards. Notable operations included Operation Uric and Operation Vanity in 1979.

=== Border War ===
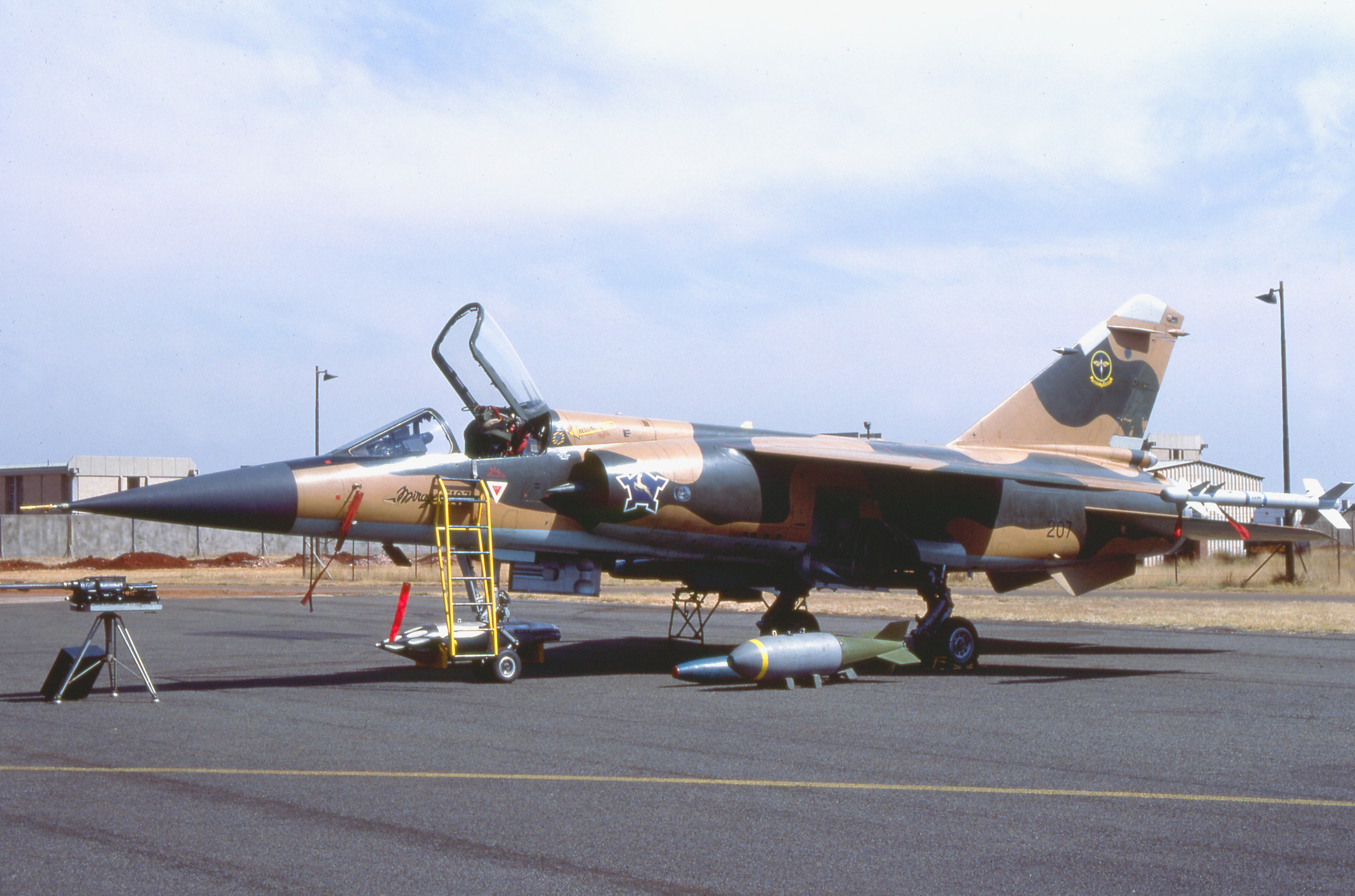
Mirage F1CZ, on tarmac in 1979

From 1966 to 1989, the SAAF was committed to the Border War, which was fought in northern South West Africa and surrounding states. At first, it provided limited air support to police operations against the People's Liberation Army of Namibia (the military wing of SWAPO, which was fighting to end South African rule of South West Africa). Operations intensified after the defence force took charge of the war in 1974. In July 1964, South Africa placed a development contract with Thomson-CSF for a mobile, all-weather, low-altitude SAM system after a South African order for the Bloodhound SAM system was refused by the UK government. This became the Crotale, or 'Cactus' in South African service. The South African government paid 85 per cent of the development costs of the system with the balance being paid for by France. The system was in service with 120 Squadron SAAF from 1970 until the late 1980s without any successful combat shootdowns.

The SAAF provided air support to the army during the 1975–76 Angola campaign, and in the many cross-border operations that were carried out against PLAN bases in Angola and Zambia from 1977 onwards.

During the bush war period, South Africa manufactured six air-deliverable tactical nuclear weapons of the "gun-type" design between 1978 and 1993. Each of the devices contained 55 kilograms of HEU with an estimated yield of 10–18 kilotons designed for delivery by Blackburn Buccaneer or English Electric Canberra aircraft. See History of the South African Air Force#Nuclear and ballistic weapons.

At least two MIG-21s of the Angolan Air Force were shot down by 3 Squadron SAAF Mirage F1s in 1981 and 1982.

From 1980 to 1984, the command structure was reorganised. Instead of units of the separate Strike Command, Transportation Command SAAF, and Maritime Air Command SAAF often being based at the same base but responsible to different chains of command, regional commands were established. Main Threat Air Command (MTAC) was made responsible for the northern half of the country, and Southern Air Command SAAF and Western Air Command SAAF for those areas. MTAC was co-located with the Air Force Command Post at Pretoria, with 20 subordinate squadrons (8 reserve). Southern Air Command at Silvermine was allocated nine squadrons (three reserve), based at AFS Port Elizabeth, Cape Town Airport, and AFB Ysterplaat, including 16 Squadron SAAF (Alouettes), 25 Squadron flying Dakotas from Ysterplaat, 27 Squadron SAAF (Piaggio 166), 35 Squadron SAAF (Avro Shackleton), and 88 Maritime Training School. Western Air Command at Windhoek relied on aircraft temporarily detached from MTAC and SAC. Airspace Control Command, Training Command and Air Logistics Command remained largely unchanged.

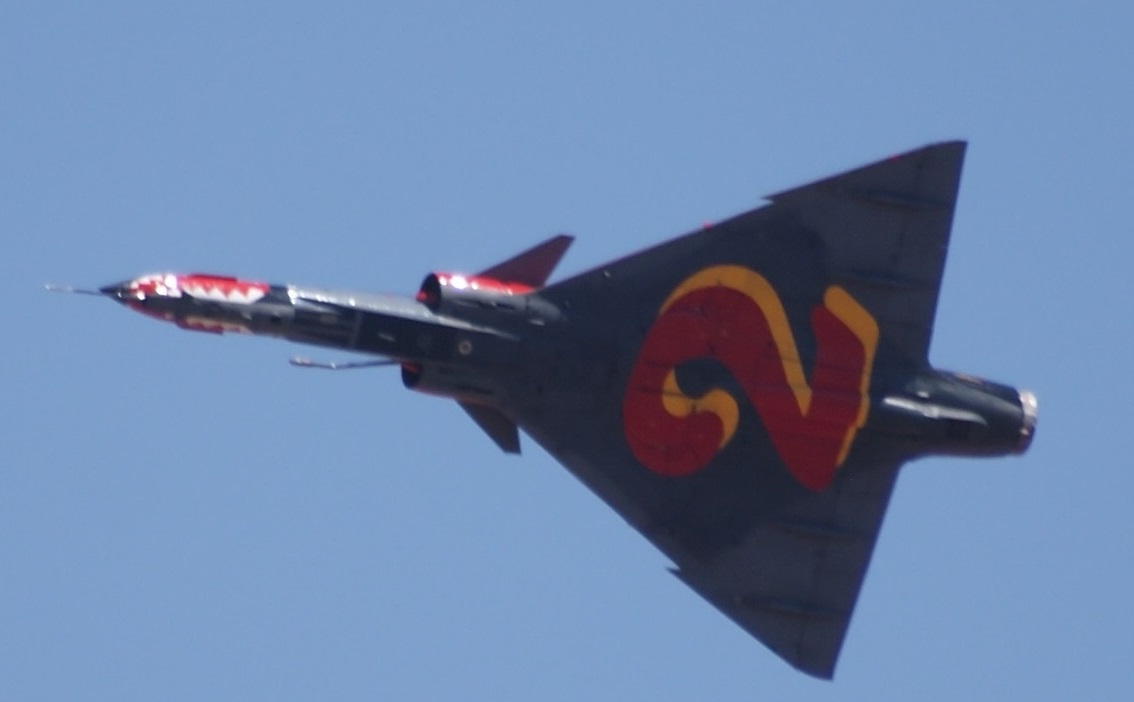
SAAF Cheetah D fighter

The SAAF was also heavily involved in the 1987–88 Angola campaign, before the New York Accords that ended the conflict. The international arms embargo imposed against the then-apartheid government of South Africa, meant that the SAAF was unable to procure modern fighter aircraft to compete with the sophisticated Soviet-supplied air defence network and Cuban Mikoyan-Gurevich MiG-23s fielded in the latter part of this conflict. South Africa was able to secure the transfer of technology from Israel through the Israel–South Africa Agreement, thereby allowing the Cheetah derivative of the IAI Kfir to be produced.

From 1990 with the perceived reduction in threat, SAAF operational strength began to be reduced. The first short term steps entailed the withdrawal of several obsolete aircraft types from service, such as the Canberra B(1)12, the Super Frelon and Westland Wasp helicopters, the Kudu light aircraft and the P-166s Albatross coastal patrol aircraft. Other initial measures included the downgrading of Air Force Base Port Elizabeth and the disbanding of 12, 16, 24, 25, and 27 Squadrons. Two Commando squadrons – 103 Squadron SAAF at AFB Bloemspruit and 114 Squadron SAAF at AFB Swartkop – were also disbanded.

==== Air Defence Artillery Group ====
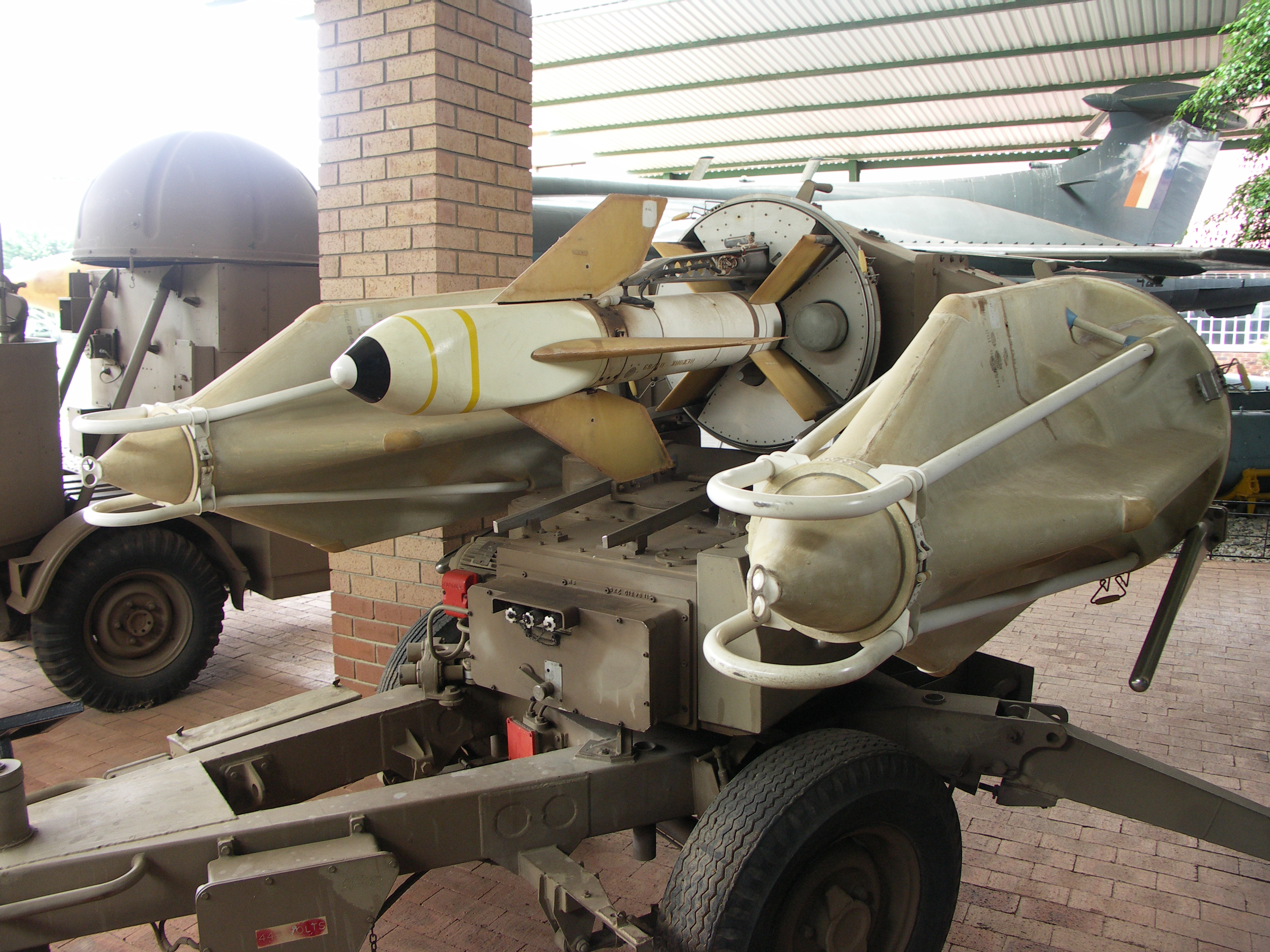
The Hilda Missile System as it was used by the 250 Air Defence Artillery Group

The 250 Air Defence Artillery Group, also known as the 250 Air Defence Unit (ADU), was a group of air defence squadrons that operated under the control of the South African Air Force tasked with airbase defence. The group consisted of 120, 121, 122, 123, 124, 125, 126, 127, 128, 129 and 130 Squadrons and had its own active Citizen Force component. These squadrons were equipped with the Tigercat mobile surface-to-air missile system, The Cactus surface-to-air missile system, the ZU-23-2 23mm Anti-Aircraft Gun and the Bofors 40 mm gun.

120 Squadron mainly operated the Cactus missile system operationally in platoons from 1973 until the late 1980s with each platoon consisting of one Acquisition and Co-ordination Unit (ACU) and two or three firing units, with a battery having two platoons. 121 Squadron, 123 Squadron and later 129 Squadron mainly operated the Tigercat mobile surface-to-air missile system. In South African service it was given the name "Hilda". 123 Squadron was deployed for Operation Savannah in 1975 to provide air defence for Air Force Base Grootfontein in South-West Africa. 129 Squadron was deployed to Air Force Base Ondangwa for the remainder of the Border War to provide air defence for the logistics base and airfield there, as it was an important staging area for the South African Defence Force for their operations in neighbouring Angola.

The Air Defence Artillery Group was disbanded in 1992 after the Cactus missile system was retired, with only remnants of 120 Squadron, operating the upgraded Cactus Container system, becoming a part of Air Command Control Unit at Snake Valley opposite Air Force Base Swartkop on the eastern side of the shared runway. 120 Squadron was finally disbanded in 2002 after these systems were retired.

==== Major operations ====
Click on show to view major SAAF operations of the Border War
Major South African Air Force operations during the Border War: 1978–1988
Date	Operation	Location / Country	Aircraft and Role	Notes
May 1978	Reindeer	Cassinga, Angola	Para-drop: 4x C-130, 5x C-160; Para extraction and support: 14x Puma, 6x Super Frelon; Strike: 6x Canberra, 4x Buccaneer; CAP: 4x IIICZ; C³: 1x Cessna-185, 1x DC-4 (EW/ELINT)	Capt. A. Marais (Buccaneer pilot) awarded HCS for action in support of ground forces.
Jul 1979	Rekstok II	Area ???	Aircraft??	Mirage III R2Z (#856) lost due to AAA, pilot ejected and was recovered to AFB Ondangwa.
1979	Vanity, Placid and Motel	Eastern Angola and Zambia	Light Bomber: Canberras from SAAF 12 Sqn with Rhodesian 5 Sqn Canberras	Operation Vanity: 25–26 Feb 1979 – bombing of ZIPRA camps in eastern Angola. Operations Placid I and II: 21 – 24 Aug 1979: Bombing of ZIPRA camps in Zambia. Operations Motel I and II: Aug 1979: Strikes on camps SW of Solwezi, Zambia.
Jun 1980	Smokeshell	Area???	Aircraft??	Impala Mk II (#1037) lost due to 23mm AAA fire. Pilot ejected and was recovered to HAA in Evale, Angola. Aircraft was recovered by Super Frelon and returned to service with same side number. Alouette III (#24) lost due to small arms fire. Pilot escaped, flight engineer killed.
Jun 1980	Sceptic and Sceptic II	Area???	Aircraft??	Results??
Dec 1980	Wishbone	Area???	Aircraft??	Results??
Aug – Sep 1981	Protea	Cunene province, Angola	Strike and CAS: 12x F1AZ, 8x F1CZ, 7x IIICZ, 6x IIID2Z, 16x Impala, 5x Buccaneer, 5x Canberra; PR: 1x Canberra, 3x IIIRZ, 2x Impala; Fire Support / Tactical Transport: 19x Alouette III, 17x Puma, 2x Super Frelon, 8 x Kudu; Para-drop and Logistics: 7x Dakota, 3x C130/160; AFC and C³: 11x Bosbok	Capt. R.C.M. Lewer DFC, HCS awarded HCS for Impala night attack on enemy positions threatening SADF stopper group on evening preceding commencement of Operation Protea. Alouette III (#48) lost to 14.4mm AAA. Crew killed.
Nov 1981	Daisy	Chitequeta, southern Angola	CAP and Strike: 20x F1; PR: 2x IIIRZ; CAS: 15x Impala; Army Support: 9x Puma, 2x Frelon, 10x Alouette; Air Transport: 4x DC3, 6x C130/160, 1x DC4; AFC and C³: 9x Bosbok	Results??
Mar 1982	Super	Kaokoveld, South West Africa and Angolan province of Namibe	Aircraft??	Air support to ground force operation to prevent SWAPO infiltration into South West Africa through the Kaokoveld from a location near the abandoned Portuguese town of Iona. Capt N. Ellis and F/Sgt S. Coetzee awarded HC for close air support to army forces.
Mar 1982	Rekstok III	Area ???	Aircraft??	Results??
Aug 1982	Meebos	Area ???	Aircraft??	Results??
Oct 1982	Bravo	Area ???	Aircraft??	Results??
1983	Maanskyn	Area ???	Aircraft??	Results??
Apr – Jun 1983	Dolfyn	Area ???	Aircraft??	Results??
May 1983	Skerve	Mozambique	Aircraft??	Results??
Aug 1983	Karton	Area ???	Aircraft??	Results??
Nov 1983 – Jan 1984	Askari	Cuvelai, Cunene province, Angola	Aircraft??	Results??
1985	Second Congress	Area ???	Aircraft??	Results??
Sep – Oct 1985	Wallpaper and Weldmesh	Area ???	Aircraft??	Results??
Jun – Nov 1987	Moduler	Cuito Cuanavale, Angola	Army Support: Alouette IIIs, Pumas; CAP and PR escort: F1CZs; CAS and Strike missions: F1AZ, Buccaneer; PR: IIR2Z; AFC: Bosbok, RPV	Operation to halt Angolan / Cuban advance on Mavinga. Pumas used for special forces insertion and extraction. 1x F1CZ damaged by MiG-23 AAM-8 missile; crash landed Rundu 27 Sep 87. SA-8 SAM system captured and flown back to S Afr by C160. 3x RPV and 1x Bosbok (#934) lost to SA-8 SAM Sep 87, pilot killed.
Nov 1987 – Mar 1988	Hooper	Cuito Cuanavale, Angola	Aircraft??	Mirage F1AZ (#245) lost to SA-13 SAM. Pilot killed.
Mar – May 1988	Packer	Cuito Cuanavale, Angola	Aircraft??	Results??
Abbreviations • CAP: Combat air patrol • PR: Photo reconnaissance • CAS: Close air support • C³: Command, control and communications • AFC: Airborne artillery fire control • HAA: Helicopter administration area • AAA: Anti-aircraft artillery

During the bush war, the SAAF lost a total of 22 aircraft (Note: 1x Mirage F1AZ, 1x Mirage III R2Z, 1x Canberra, 5x Impala Mk. II, 1x Bosbok, 1x Cessna-185, 4x Puma, 5x Alouette, 3x RPV.) (1974–1989) to enemy action. A further 11 aircraft (Note: 3x Impala, 1x Mirage F1AZ, 2x Puma, 1x Kudu, 3x Alouette, 1x Cessna-185.) were lost in the operational area due to pilot error or malfunction.

=== Since 1994 ===
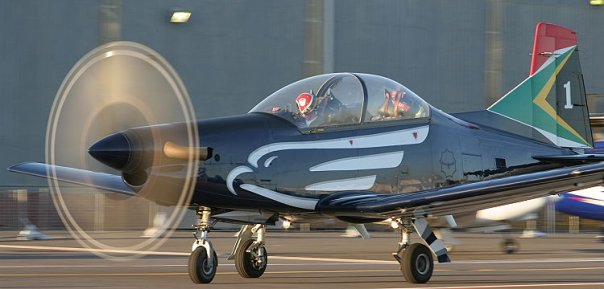
Silver Falcons aerobatic team use Pilatus trainers

After the first South African multi-racial elections in 1994, the SAAF became part of the South African National Defence Force (SANDF). The South African Air Force is currently considered to be the most effective air force in sub-Sahara Africa despite the loss of capability as a consequence of defence cuts after the end of the Border War.

These financial cuts have brought about a number of severe operational limitations, compounded by the loss of experienced air-crews. This has placed strain on the bringing new types of aircraft into service, specifically the Gripen, Hawk, Rooivalk, A 109 and Lynx. The cancellation of the SAAF participation and procurement of the A400M in November 2009 has denied the SAAF the strategic airlift capability needed for domestic, regional and continent-wide transport operations. There is no clear indication as yet regarding how the heavy/long-range airlift gap will be addressed.

Current air combat capabilities are limited to the Gripen multi-role fighter and the Rooivalk combat support helicopter although in insufficient number to allow regional deployments while maintaining national air security and current training commitments. To overcome this shortfall, the SAAF has designated the Hawk Mk 120 trainers for additional tactical reconnaissance and weapon delivery platforms for targets designated by the Gripens. Financial constraints have further limited flying hours on the newly acquired aircraft; it was planned to keep Gripen pilots current flying the lower cost Hawk aircraft with "Gripenised" cockpits. It was reported in 2013 that the Gripen fleet wasn't fully manned with some pilots redesignated as reserve pilots and others being assigned instructor roles at Air Force Base Makhado. The SAAF stated that the Gripen fleet is being rotated between short-term storage and active use by the regular active pilots to spread the limited flying hours among the whole fleet. During this same period it was reported that 18 of the SAAF's AgustaWestland AW109 helicopters have been grounded due to an accident involving one of the helicopters several months prior and a lack of funds for regular maintenance, however in November 2013 after five months of not flying, the grounding of the helicopters was lifted after more funds became available. Despite all its setbacks and financial woes, the South African Air Force continues to undertake and complete the tasks and obligations assigned to it. The SAAF still plays a vital role in national security operations, United Nations peacekeeping missions, and other foreign deployments. As of 2014 the Air force has several aircraft, aircrew and ground crew on foreign deployments. Three Rooivalk attack helicopters from 16 Squadron SAAF and five or six 15, 17, 19 and/or 22 Squadron SAAF's Oryx transport helicopters were stationed in Goma in the Democratic Republic of the Congo as part of the United Nations Organization Stabilization Mission in the Democratic Republic of the Congo (MONUSCO). The Rooivalk and Oryx Helicopters are part of the South African contribution to the 3000-strong United Nations Force Intervention Brigade (FIB) and they have flown several sorties against rebel factions who are operating in North Kivu province, particularly the notorious M23 militia group who were routed from their strongholds after an offensive by the UN Force Intervention Brigade and the Military of the Democratic Republic of the Congo.

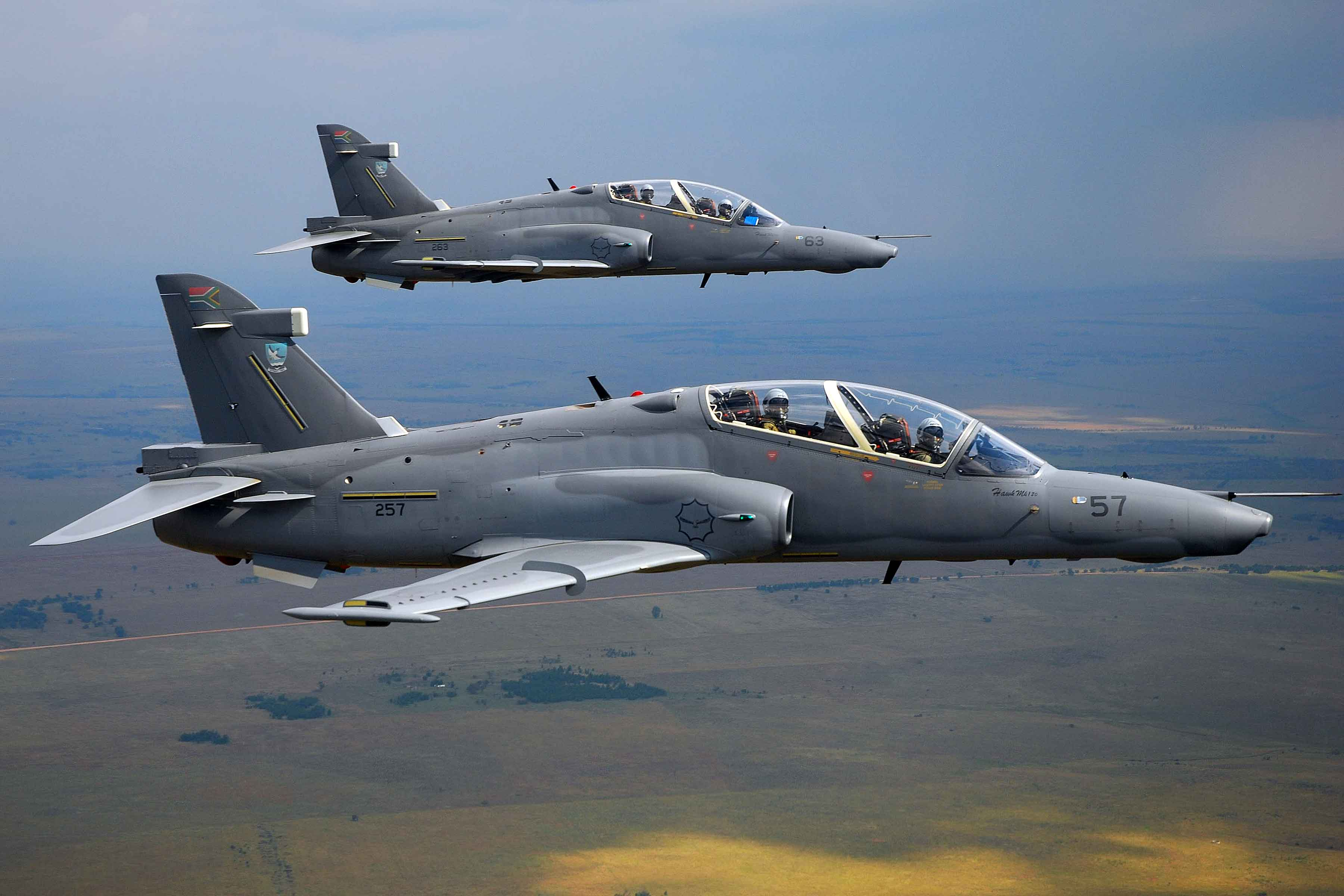
A pair of Hawk 120s conduct a security simulation over Swartkop in preparation for the 2010 World Cup

Several 28 Squadron SAAF C-130BZ Hercules aircraft also regularly flew to Sudan, DR Congo and Uganda, including Lubumbashi, Kinshasa, Goma, Beni, Bunia and Entebbe, as Entebbe is the logistic hub for MONUSCO in the eastern DR Congo. They mainly fly missions ranging from logistic support for SA National Defence Force continental peacekeeping and peace support operations, humanitarian operations, support to the South African Army, and general airlift. A C-47TP Turbo Dakota from 35 Squadron SAAF permanently based in the Mozambican city of Pemba to provide maritime patrol capability for the Southern African Development Community (SADC) counter-piracy mission in the Mozambique Channel, Operation Copper. There is also a Super Lynx from 22 Squadron SAAF operating from the South African Navy frigates whenever they are stationed in the Mozambican channel. The air force also assists Operation Corona from "time to time" by deploying either AgustaWestland AW109 or Atlas Oryx helicopters to its borders.

During the 2010 FIFA World Cup the South African National Defence Force was deployed in order to provide security for the event. The air force deployed armed Gripen Fighter aircraft and Hawk advanced trainer aircraft to conduct air patrols to monitor air traffic. Rooivalk, Atlas Oryx and AgustaWestland AW109 helicopters were also deployed during the event.

It was also reported by the Afrikaans daily newspaper, Beeld, that on 23 March 2013 when the Séléka rebel group attempted to take power in the Central African Republic by invading the capital of Bangui, four armed Gripen Fighter aircraft from 2 Squadron SAAF were sent along with a C-130BZ transport aircraft (reportedly carrying a stock of bombs) in order to provide close air support to the 200-strong South African garrison who were still fighting in the city. The aircraft were, however, recalled shortly after, as the South Africans and the rebels agreed to a ceasefire and rather opted to withdraw peacefully from the country. Several flights made by C-130BZ aircraft evacuated the bodies of the 13 South African soldiers who were killed and the 27 who were wounded during the Séléka offensive and also the remainder of the deployed soldiers and their equipment after the ceasefire was declared. The deployment of the Gripen fighter aircraft indicated that if the situation called for it, the country will deploy its fighter aircraft in order to ensure the protection of its assets.

The air force was also tasked with maintaining national security before and during the funeral procession of former president Nelson Mandela in December 2013. Several SAAF helicopters conducted patrols over Pretoria while the former president's body was lying in state in the days leading up to the funeral. Gripen fighter aircraft, armed with IRIS-T missiles and Digital Joint Reconnaissance Pods, conducted combat air patrols to enforce a no-fly zone for several days over certain areas in Gauteng province and later during the funeral itself over Qunu, in the Eastern Cape. Two Gripens were also tasked with escorting a C-130BZ aircraft, which was carrying President Mandela's body from Air Force Base Waterkloof to the Mthatha Airport. Five Gripens, three Oryx helicopters and the 6 Pilatus PC-7's of the Silver Falcons performed a flypast in a final salute to the late former president.

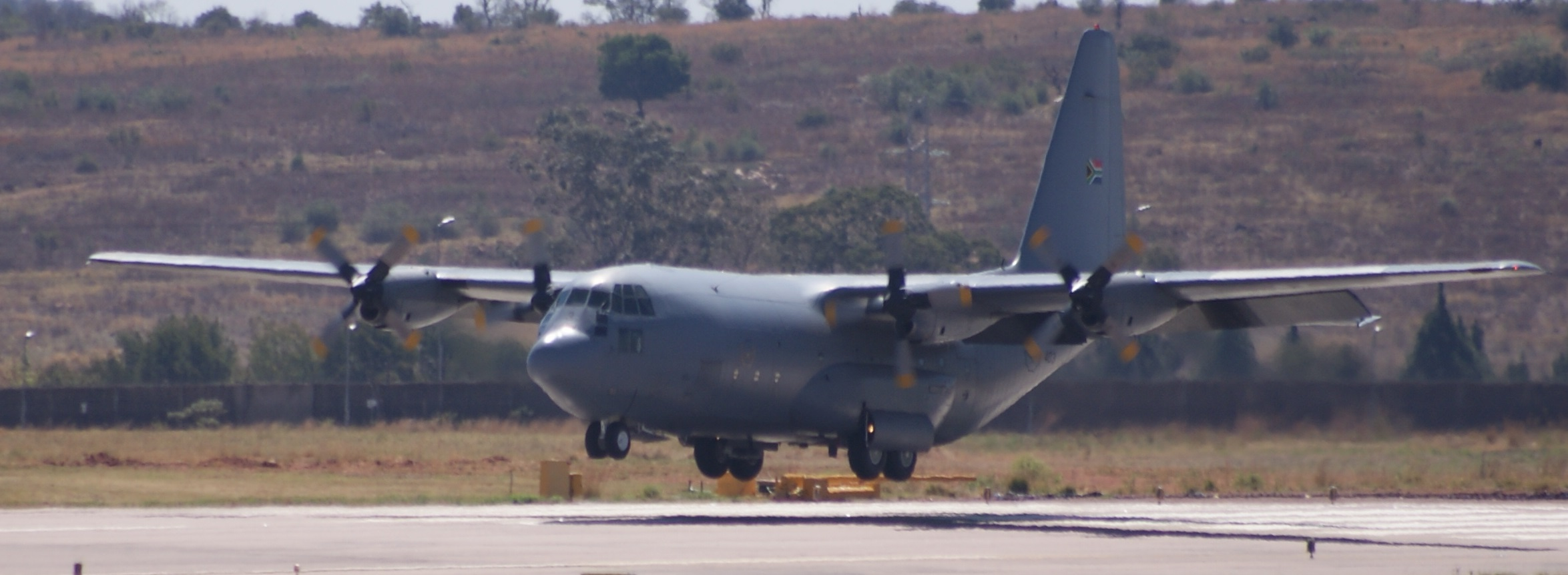
SAAF C130 BZ Hercules of 28 Squadron

On 12 September 2014, a church hostel collapsed within the compound of the Synagogue, Church of All Nations in Lagos, Nigeria. More than 100 persons died in the collapse, among them 85 South Africans. President Jacob Zuma ordered the South African Air Force to assist with the repatriation of survivors and victims, and the first 25 survivors were flown to South Africa in a specially adapted SAAF Hercules C-130 on 22 September 2014. Due to a lack of airlift capacity, an Antonov aircraft from Maximus Aero was chartered in order to repatriate the bodies of 74 victims, which arrived on 15 November 2014. The last 11 bodies were finally repatriated using an SAAF C-130 on 6 February 2015. The delay in repatriating the last bodies was due to authorities having to wait for DNA test results in order to positively identify the remaining victims.

In spite of its budget concerns, the air force still continues to participate in and support annual air and defence shows and capability demonstrations such as the Rand show, the Zwartkops airshow and the Africa Aerospace and Defence Expo.

In 2002 Musa Mbhokota became the SAAF's first black jet fighter pilot. In March 2017 Nandi Zama became for first black woman in SAAF history to command and fly a Hercules C-130 cargo plane.

As of 2021, Department of Defence officials informed Parliament that a reduced availability of aircraft was negatively affecting hours flown. Helicopter systems were said to have "a critical spares shortage" with similar problems also confronting the transport and combat aircraft and systems. The parliamentary Defence and Military Veterans (PCDMV) committee was told that "Constrained funding is also affecting the ability to provide enough serviceable aircraft, although serious efforts are being made to ensure availability is increased within the reduced budget". During the first quarter of the 2021/22 financial year, the air force flew 3,560.8 hours, including 2,717 Force Preparation hours, 636.7 Force Employment hours; and 207.1 VIP flying hours. As of late 2021, all the Air Force's Gripen fighter aircraft were grounded. However, in 2022 the Air Force concluded a deal with Saab to return 13 of the aircraft to service over a three-year period. As of March 2025, only six aircraft in total are reported to be in working order.

== Symbols ==
=== Ensign ===
Ensigns of the South African Air Force
1920–1940

1940–1951

1951–1958

1958–1967

1967–1970

1970–1981

1981–1982

1982–1994

1994–2003

2003–present

=== Roundels ===
Roundels of the South African Air Force
1920
(experimental)

1920
(experimental)

1920–1927

1927–1947

1947–1958

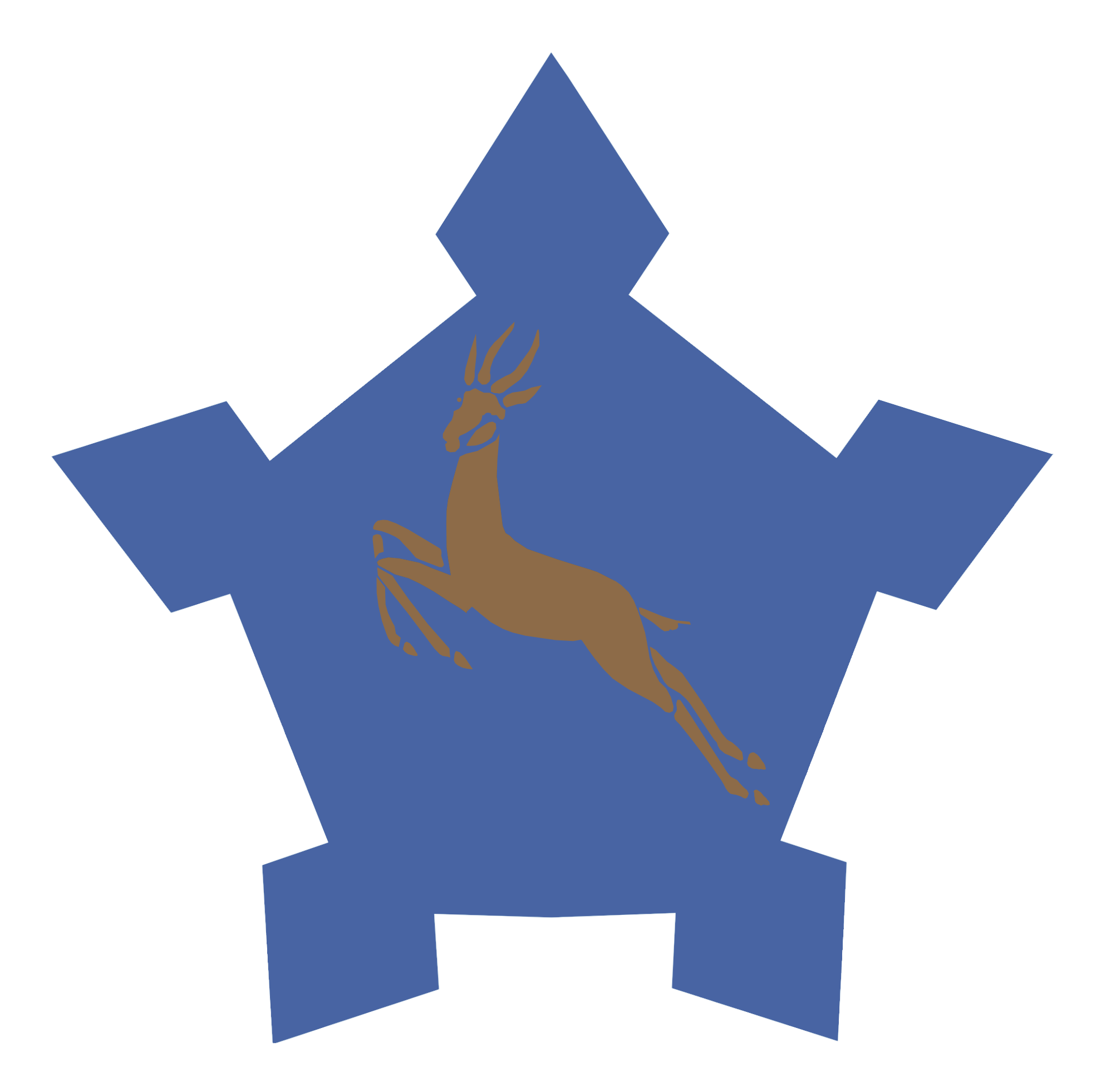
1958–1993

1993–2003

2003–present

2003–present
(low visibility)

=== Rank insignia ===
In 2002 the Air Force rank insignia were changed from one which was shared with the Army to a new pattern based on stripes. The Air Force stated that this was "in order to bring it more in line with international forms of rank". The General ranks initially had a thick stripe (thicker than the Senior Officer rank stripe) with thin stripes above, but this was changed shortly after implementation to the crossed sword and baton insignia typical of Commonwealth Generals. The reason for the change so soon after implementation of the new insignia was presumed to be confusion in differentiating between Generals and Senior Officers.

Officers

Rank group	General/Flag/Air officers				Senior officers			Junior officers
South African Air Force
South African Air Force	General	Lieutenant general	Major general	Brigadier general	Colonel	Lieutenant colonel	Major	Captain	Lieutenant	Second lieutenant

Warrant officers

Note: The Rank of Master Chief Warrant Officer is only used when the Sergeant Major of the Air Force is also the Sergeant Major of the Defence Force.

Equivalent NATO rank	WO-5	WO-4	WO-3	WO-2	WO-1
South African Air Force
South African Air Force	Master chief warrant officer	Senior chief warrant officer	Chief warrant officer	Master warrant officer	Senior warrant officer

Other ranks

Rank group	Senior NCOs				Junior NCOs		Enlisted
South African Air Force							No insignia
South African Air Force	Warrant officer class 1	Warrant officer class 2	Flight sergeant	Sergeant	Corporal	Lance corporal	Airman

=== SAAF medals and decorations ===
A new set of emblems, medals and decorations were introduced on 29 April 2003, although medals issued by the SADF can still be worn.

=== Unit emblems ===
==== Air force bases ====
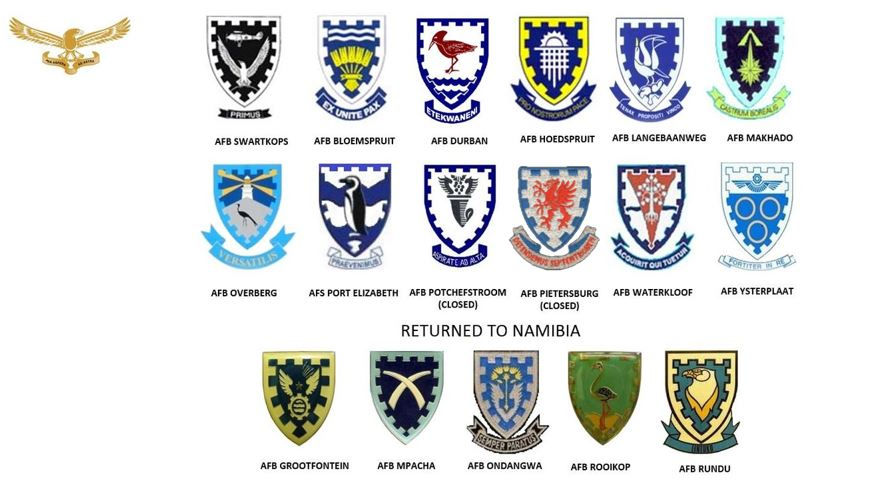

==== Flying squadrons ====
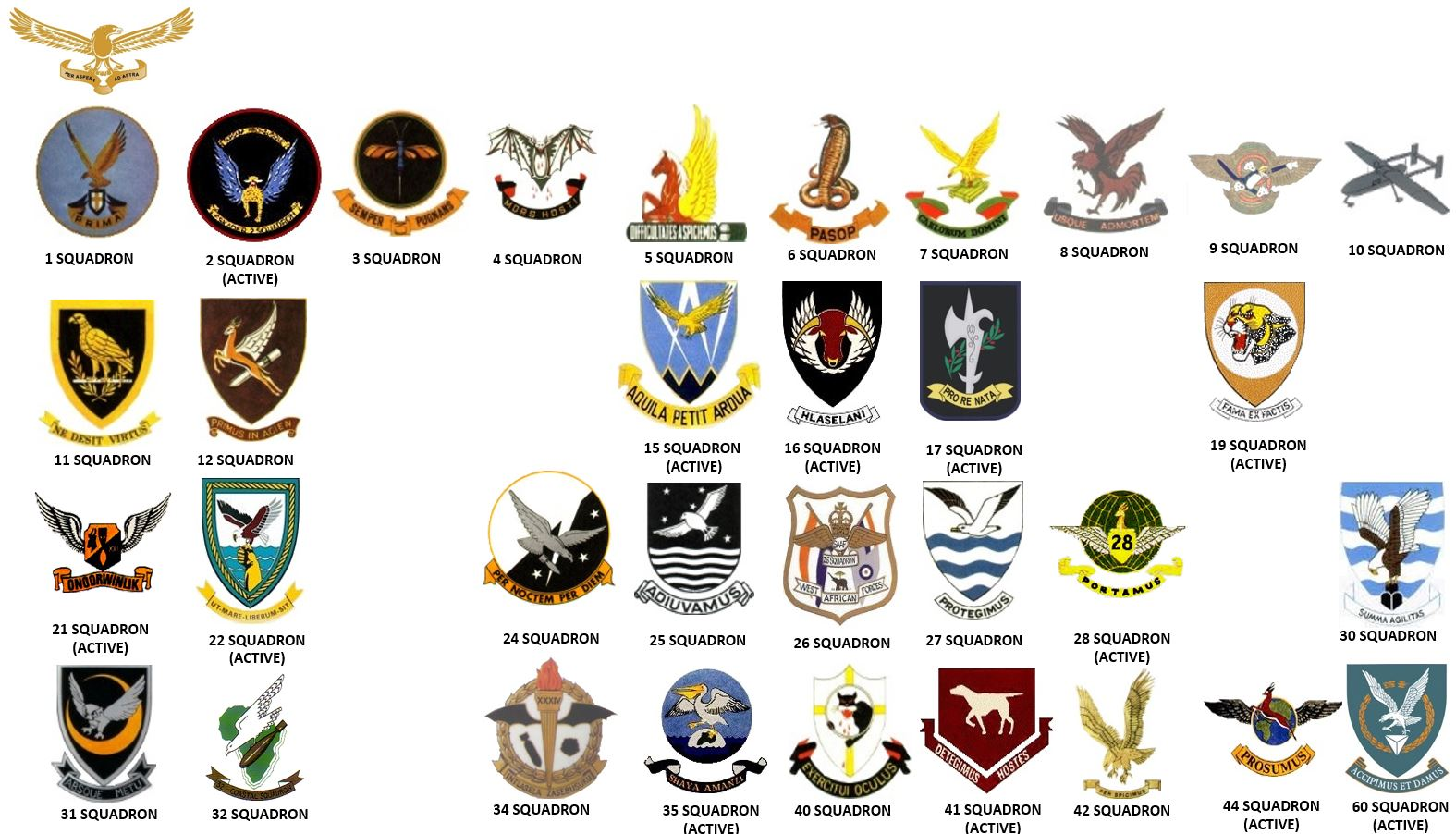
South African Air Force Flying Squadrons

==== Reserve squadrons ====
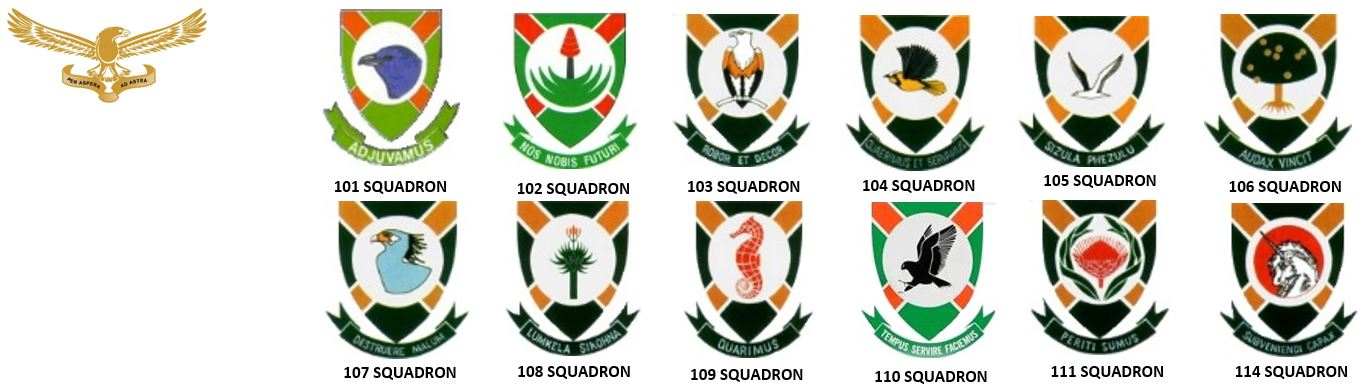
South African Air Force Reserve Squadrons

==== Other flying units ====
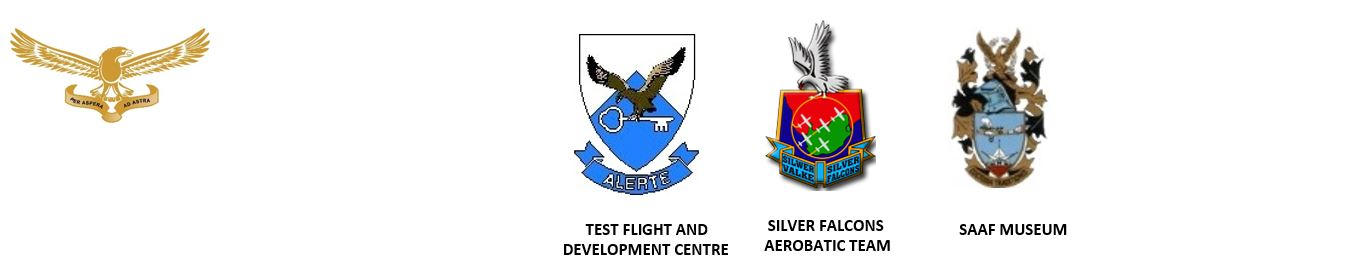
South African Air Force Other Flying Units

==== Security squadrons ====
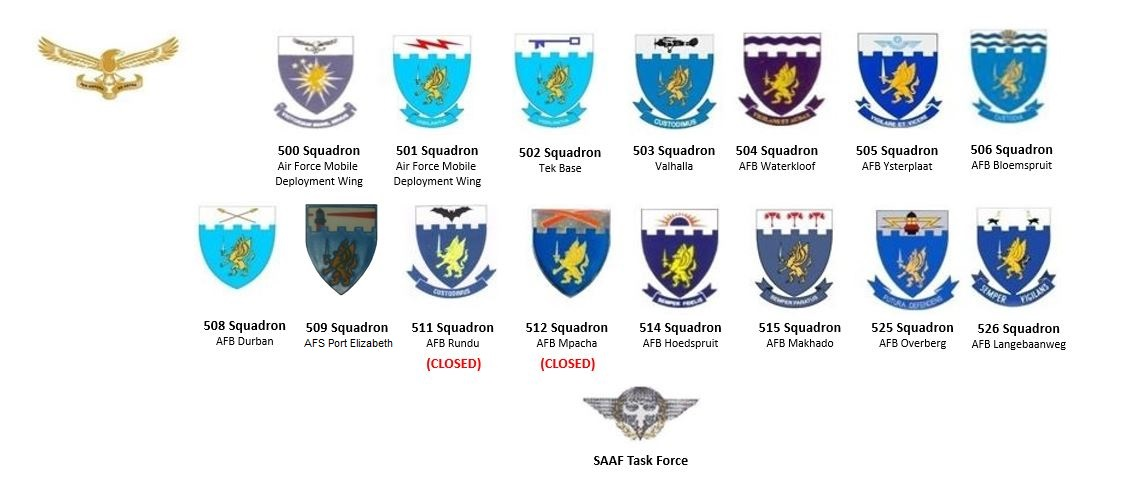
South African Air Force Security Squadrons

==== Engineering support units ====
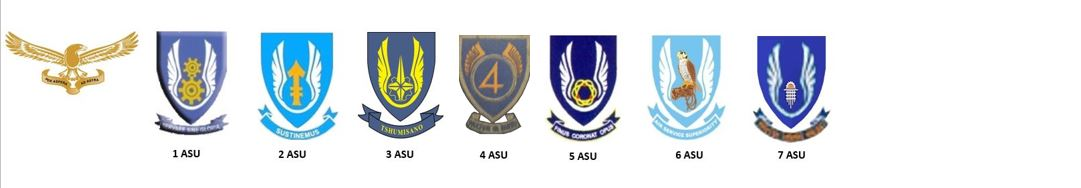
South African Air Force Engineering Units

==== Air defence artillery units ====
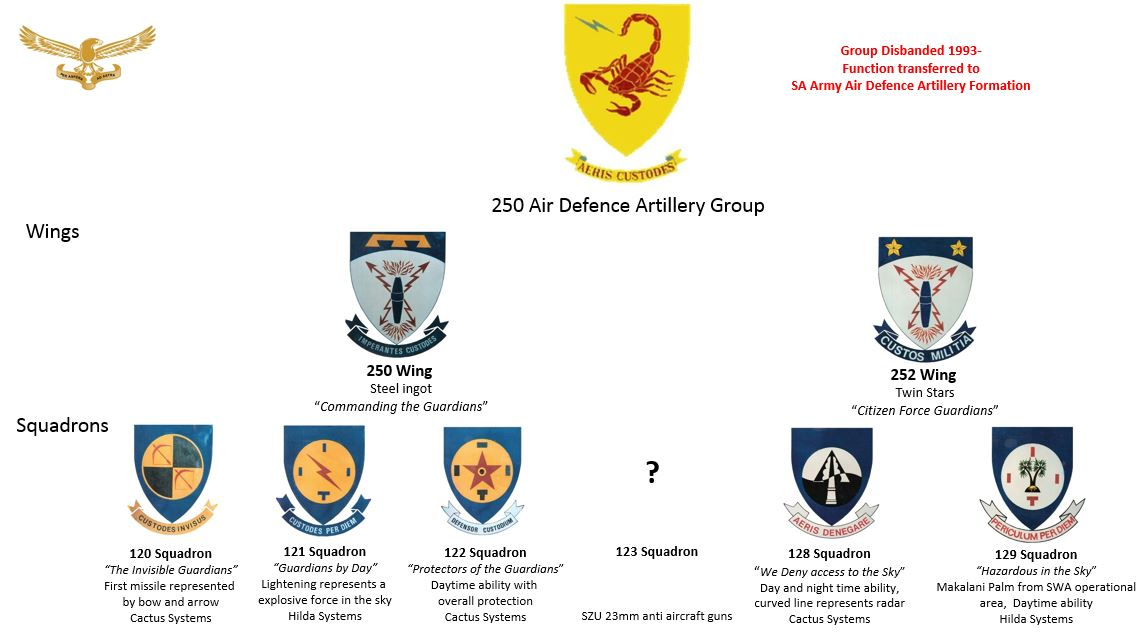
250 Air Defence Artillery Group Structure

==== Command and control units ====
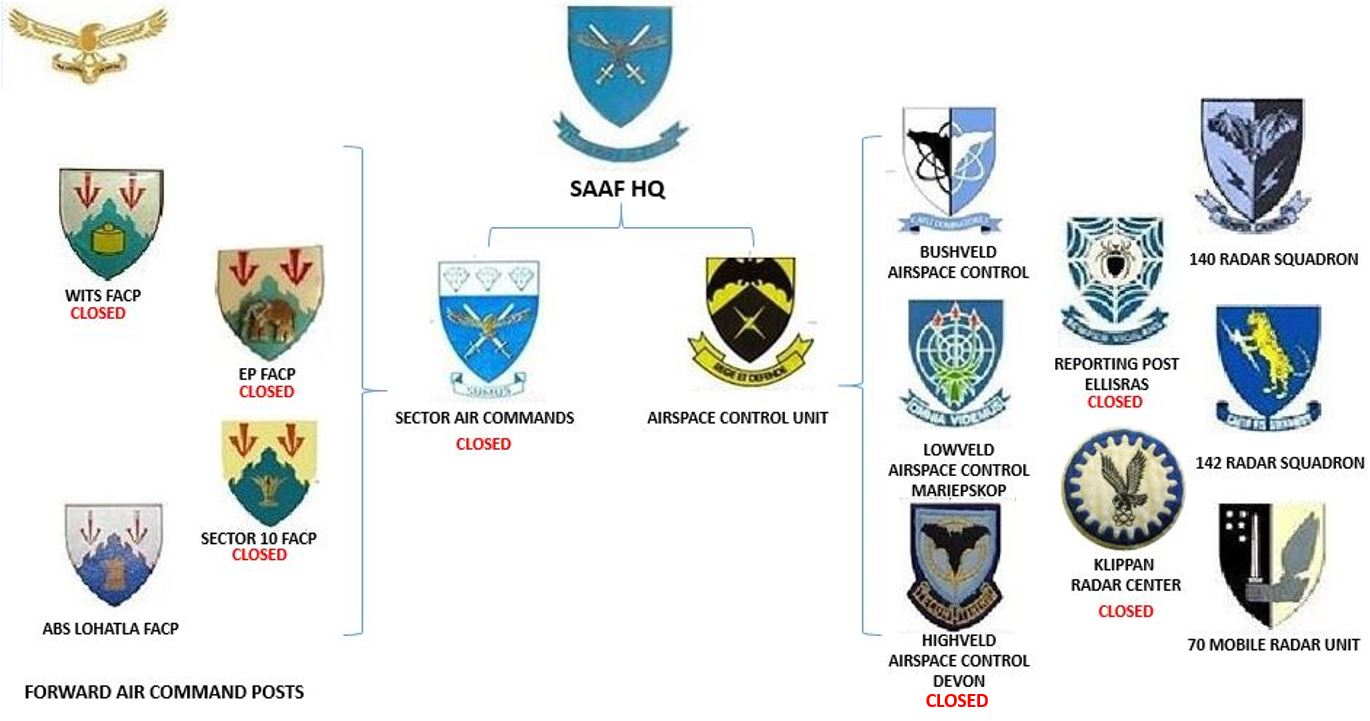
South African Air Force Command and Control Units

The various Forward Air Command Posts and Air Operations Teams were closed on 31 December 2003 and integrated in the new Joint Regional Task Groups under command of Chief of Joint Operations.

==== Training units ====
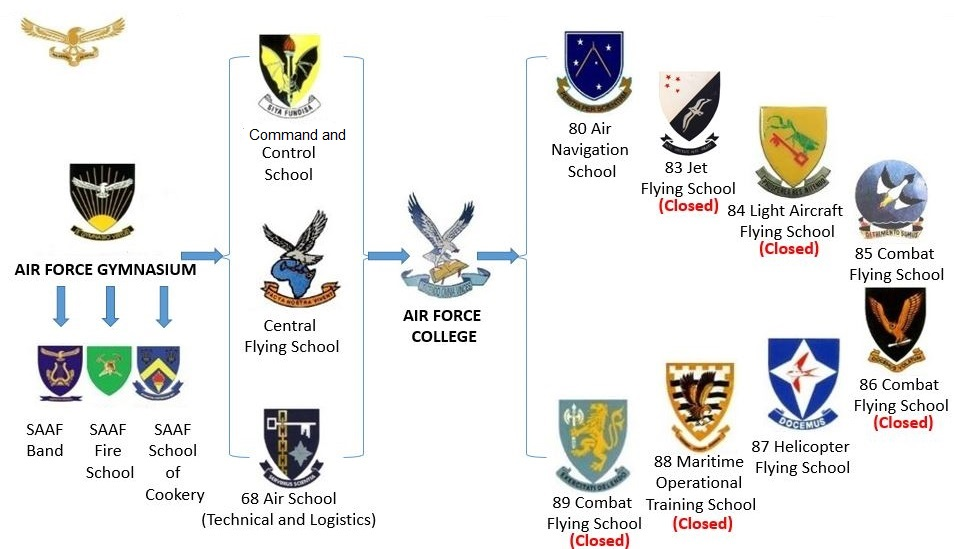
South African Air Force Training Units

==== Support units ====
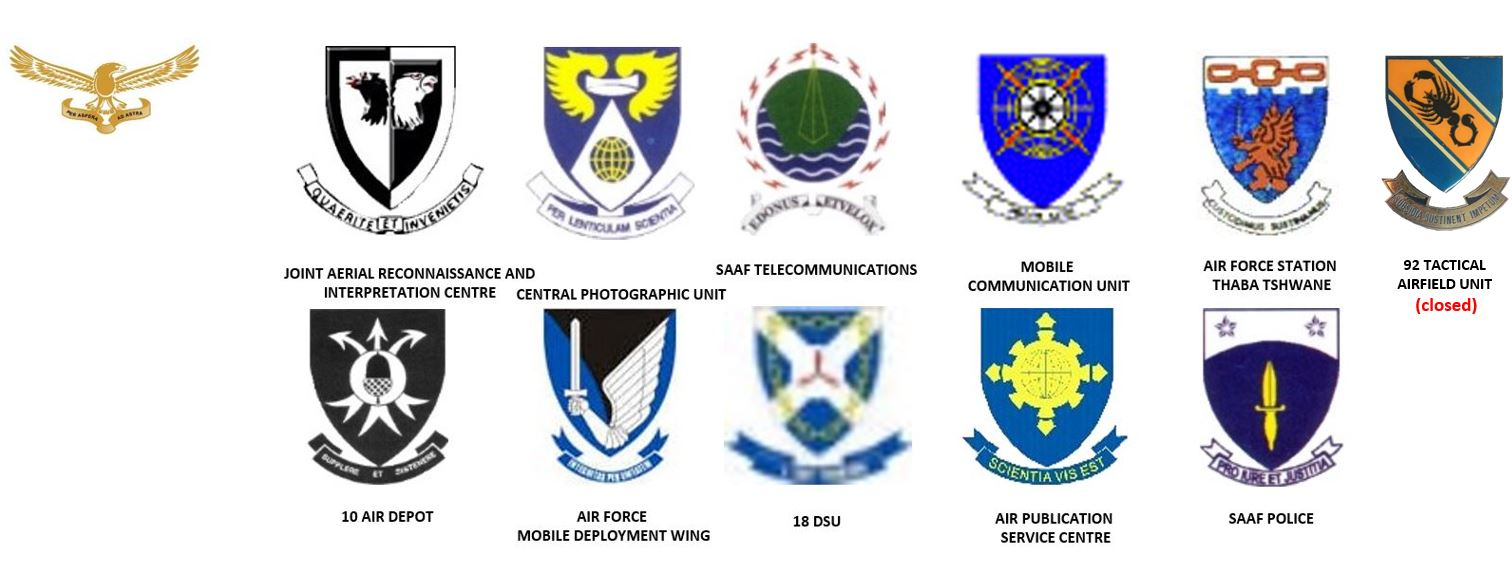
South African Air Force Support Units ver 3

== Order of battle, bases squadrons and equipment ==
=== Bases ===
Map of South African Air Force bases and stations (Click on base icon for link to details)

=== Squadrons ===
Click on show to view order of battle and equipment fit of current SAAF Squadrons and Units
Note: Squadron composition as seen below is incomplete.
Squadron Number	Base	Type of Aircraft	Role	Composition
2 Squadron SAAF	AFB Makhado	Gripen	Air-Defence	9 Gripen D, 17 Gripen C
15 Squadron SAAF	AFB Durban	Atlas Oryx, MBB/Kawasaki BK 117	Transport	
15 Squadron - C Flight	AFS Port Elizabeth	BK 117 – converting to Agusta A109	Transport	
16 Squadron SAAF	AFB Bloemspruit	Denel Rooivalk	Attack	11 Rooivalk Mk I
17 Squadron SAAF	AFB Swartkop	Atlas Oryx, Agusta A109	Transport	4 A109
19 Squadron SAAF	AFB Hoedspruit	Atlas Oryx, Agusta A109	Transport	5 A109
21 Squadron SAAF	AFB Waterkloof	Boeing BBJ, Cessna Citation I, Dassault Falcon 50, Dassault Falcon 900	VIP Transport	
22 Squadron SAAF	AFB Ysterplaat	Atlas Oryx, Westland Super Lynx 300	Transport	
28 Squadron SAAF	AFB Waterkloof	Lockheed C-130BZ Hercules	Medium Transport	
35 Squadron SAAF	AFB Ysterplaat	C-47TP Dakota	Maritime patrol/Transport	
41 Squadron SAAF	AFB Waterkloof	Cessna 208, Pilatus PC-12, Beechcraft 200C King Air	Light Transport	
44 Squadron SAAF	AFB Waterkloof	CASA C-212 Aviocar, CASA CN-235	Light Transport	
60 Squadron SAAF	AFB Waterkloof	No operational aircraft. Planned acquisition of Airbus A400Ms cancelled in November 2009.	Transport/Aerial refueling/EW/ELINT	
80 Air Navigation School	AFB Ysterplaat		Navigation training	
85 Combat Flying School	AFB Makhado	BAE Systems Hawk Mk.120	Jet-flight training/Combat Operation	24 Hawk Mk.120
87 Helicopter Flying School	AFB Bloemspruit	Atlas Oryx, Agusta A109, BK 117	Helicopter flight training	9 A109
Central Flying School	AFB Langebaanweg	Pilatus PC-7 MkII	Flight training. (Note: Ab initio training is outsourced to a civilian school, Babcock Central Flying Academy of Grand Central Airport using Cessna 172s. The training is done at AFB Swartkop)	
Test Flight and Development Centre	AFB Overberg	1x Agusta 109, 1x SAAB Gripen D, 1x BAe Hawk Mk.120, 1x Atlas Oryx (Note: As well as others on temporary detachment from squadrons and manufacturers.)	Test flight and evaluation	
SA Air Force College	Other locations			
SAAF Museum Historic Flight	AFB Swartkop			
Joint Air Reconnaissance Intelligence Centre	AFB Waterkloof		Air Intelligence	
101 Squadron	AFB Hoedspruit		Light Transport (Reserve)	
102 Squadron	AFB Makhado		Light Transport (Reserve)	
104 Squadron	AFB Waterkloof		Light Transport (Reserve)	
105 Squadron	AFB Durban		Light Transport (Reserve)	
106 Squadron	AFB Bloemspruit		Light Transport (Reserve)	
107 Squadron	AFB Bloemspruit		Light Transport (Reserve)	
108 Squadron	AFS Port Elizabeth		Light Transport (Reserve)	
110 Squadron	AFB Ysterplaat		Light Transport (Reserve)	
111 Squadron	AFB Waterkloof		Light Transport (Reserve)	
1 Air Servicing Unit	AFS Thaba Tshwane		Support and maintenance	
2 Air Servicing Unit	AFB Ysterplaat		Support and maintenance	
3 Air Servicing Unit	AFB Makhado		Support and maintenance	
4 Air Servicing Unit	Air Force Mobile Deployment Wing		Support and maintenance	
5 Air Servicing Unit	AFB Waterkloof		Support and maintenance	
7 Air Servicing Unit	AFB Hoedspruit		Support and maintenance	
10 Air Depot	AFS Thaba Tshwane		Logistic support services	
68 Air School	TEK Base		Technical aviation training	
18 Deployment Support Unit	Air Force Mobile Deployment Wing		Logistic support services	
92 Tactical Airfield Unit	Air Force Mobile Deployment Wing			
97 Tactical Airfield Unit	Air Force Mobile Deployment Wing		Logistic support services	
140 Squadron	Air Force Mobile Deployment Wing		Long Range 3D Mobile Radar	
142 Squadron	Air Force Mobile Deployment Wing		Tactical Mobile Radar	
500 Squadron	Air Force Mobile Deployment Wing		Special Operations Task Force	
501 Squadron	Air Force Mobile Deployment Wing		Security services	
502 Squadron	TEK Base		Security services	
503 Squadron	Valhalla		Security services	
504 Squadron	AFB Waterkloof		Security services	
505 Squadron	AFB Ysterplaat		Security services	
506 Squadron	AFB Bloemspruit		Security services	
508 Squadron	AFB Durban		Security services	
514 Squadron	AFB Hoedspruit		Security services	
515 Squadron	AFB Makhado		Security services	
525 Squadron	AFB Overberg		Security services	
526 Squadron	AFB Langebaanweg		Security services	
Air Force Gymnasium	AFB Hoedspruit		Basic training of new airforce members	
Bushveld Airspace Control Sector	Air Command, Air Force Headquarters (Pretoria)		Training (Air defence)/Air Traffic Control Services	
Lowveld Airspace Control Sector	AFB Hoedspruit		Training (Air defence)/Air Traffic Control Services	
Mobile Communications Unit	Air Force Mobile Deployment Wing		Mobile communications	
Rapid Deployment Air Operations Team 43	Wonderboom		Logistic support services	
Rapid Deployment Air Operations Team 46	Johannesburg		Logistic support services	
Air Publications Service Centre	AFS Thaba Tshwane		Maintains documentation, aviation regulations and acts	
SA Air Force Band	Valhalla		Ceremonial	
Command and Control School	AFB Waterkloof		Training	
School of Cookery	Valhalla		Training of chefs and waiters	
Fire Training School	Valhalla		Fire fighting and rescue training	
Air Force Command and Control School	AFB Hoedspruit		Command and Control, Airspace Control and Telecommunications training	
Airspace Control Unit	AFB Swartkop		Logistics support services (Air defence)	
Central Photographic Institute	AFB Waterkloof		Photographic services	
Combined Auction Centre	Other		Logistic support services	
Ellisras Reporting Post	Other		Early Warning Radar installation	
SAAF Police	Other		Security services	
SAAF Telecommunications Centre	AFB Waterkloof		Logistics support services	
Electronic Warfare Centre	AFB Waterkloof		Logistics support services	

== Aircraft ==
=== Air combat ===
==== Gripen ====
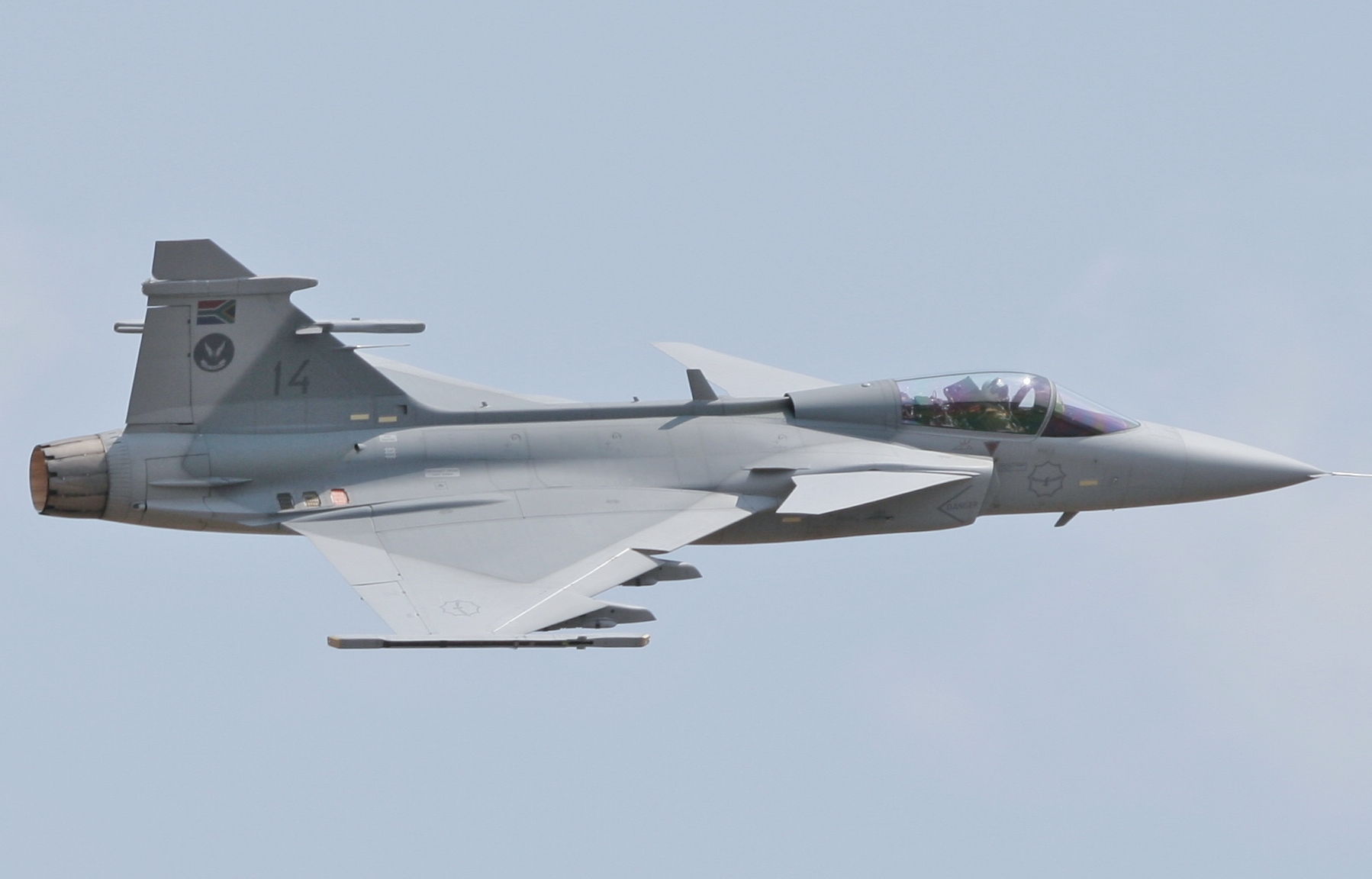
Gripen C

The Saab JAS 39 Gripen is the SAAF's primary multirole fighter, acquired under the 1999 Strategic Defence Package. During the late Cold War, the SAAF operated one of the continent's largest fighter forces, comprising 68 Atlas Cheetahs and 48 Mirage F1s. Following the conclusion of the Border War, defence restructuring and cuts reduced the active Cheetah fleet as the Mirage F1 was retired. Project Carver, an indigenous fighter programme intended to replace the Cheetah, was cancelled following the end of hostilities and lifting of international sanctions. The Advanced Light Fighter Aircraft (ALFA) programme was subsequently launched under Project Ukhozi to procure an imported replacement, with the Gripen selected over other contending aircraft. Although historical procurement documents showed an original plan for 38 aircraft, the procurement was scaled back for various reasons to 26, comprising 17 single-seat JAS 39Cs and nine dual-seat JAS 39Ds, delivered between 2008 and 2012.

The Gripen has a single-engine delta wing configuration, a maximum speed of Mach 2 (about 2,100 km/h), and advanced avionics, electronic warfare systems and high manoeuvrability. South African aircraft carry the Litening III targeting pod and Digital Joint Reconnaissance Pod, and are armed with a 27 mm Mauser BK-27 cannon and IRIS-T short-range air-to-air missiles. The IRIS-T is set to be replaced by the locally developed A-Darter, a stealthier and more agile alternative first delivered operationally in 2025 that significantly improves dogfighting capability, while the Marlin beyond-visual-range missile is intended to restore the long-range capability previously provided by the R-Darter. Integration of the Multi-Purpose Stand-Off Weapon (MUPSOW), a cruise missile developed by Denel Dynamics under a 1991 SAAF contract, has also been explored; it is not known whether it entered service, with details possibly classified.

The Gripens are operated by 2 Squadron at AFB Makhado, with the dual-seat Gripen D used for pilot conversion and training. The aircraft have supported national air policing, including security during the 2010 FIFA World Cup, and deployed during the 2013 Central African Republic conflict. In 2021, a Gripen was severely damaged during ground maintenance when a anchoring cable snapped causing damage; it was the only Gripen lost or seriously damaged in SAAF service. Budget constraints restrict flying hours and aircraft availability, with aircraft rotated between active service and short-term storage to reduce operating costs. Although the SAAF once operated more than 110 frontline fighters across three combat squadrons, 2 Squadron remains its sole fighter unit, with the Gripen forming the nucleus of South Africa's air combat capability.

==== Hawk ====
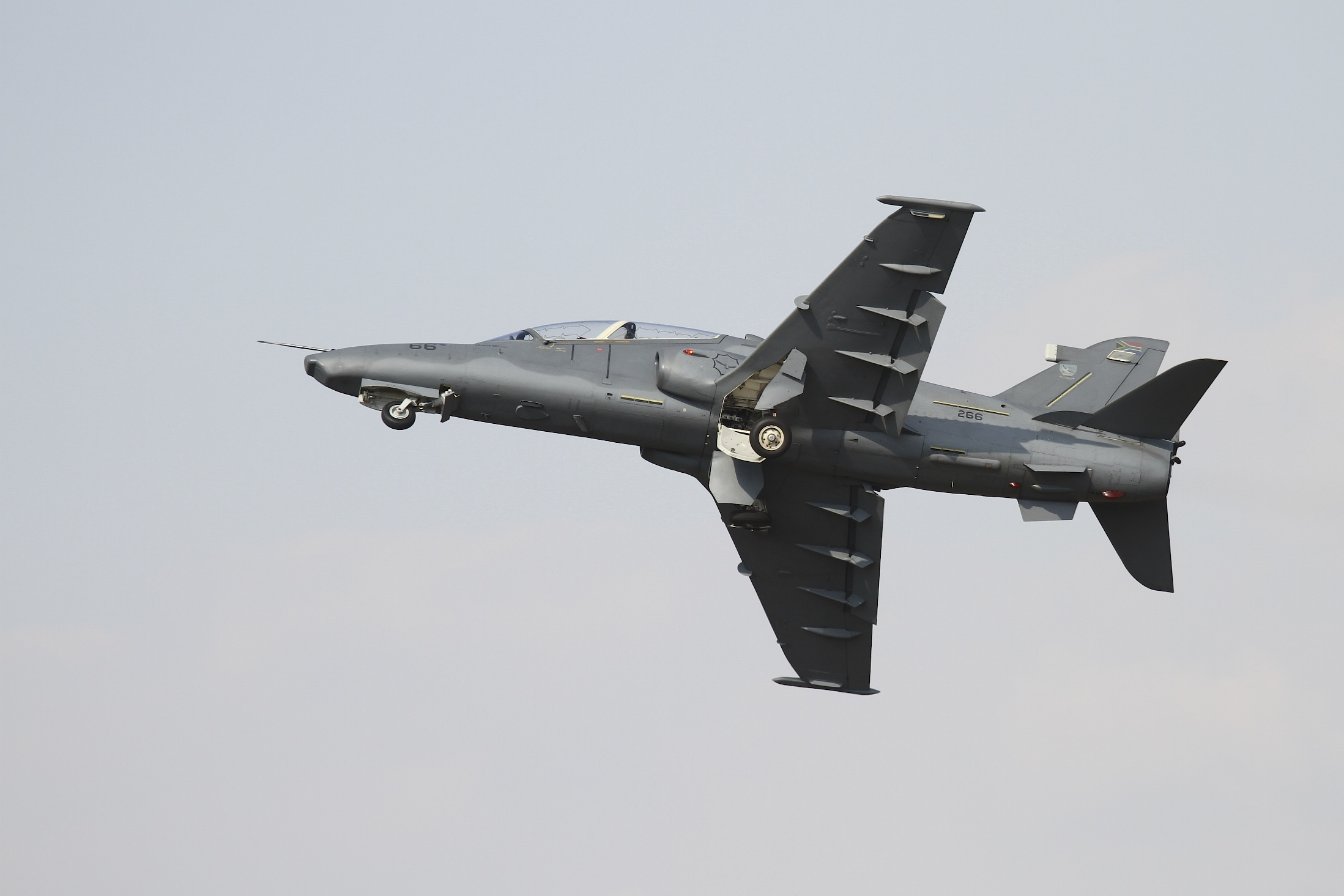
Hawk 120

The BAE Systems Hawk Mk 120 is the SAAF's lead-in fighter trainer (LIFT), acquired under the 1999 Strategic Defence Package as the Advanced Fighter Trainer (AFT) under Project Winchester to replace the ageing Atlas Impala fleet and bridge the gap between basic flight training and frontline Gripen operations. The SAAF had once operated more than 300 Impalas, although the fleet had been rationalised to 94 aircraft by the 1990s because of airframe fatigue and rising operating costs, prompting the need for a replacement. Following evaluations of the Hawk and Aermacchi MB-339, the Hawk was selected, with 24 aircraft delivered between 2005 and 2008, including 23 assembled locally in South Africa through the BAE Systems–Denel partnership.

Equipped with digital avionics and navigation systems designed to replicate the Gripen's cockpit environment, the Hawk has a maximum speed of Mach 0.9 (about 1,040 km/h, 646 mph, 561 kn), enabling pilots to transition to frontline fighter operations. Although primarily a trainer, it retains a secondary light attack capability and can carry air-to-air and air-to-ground weapons, including a 30 mm ADEN cannon, precision-guided munitions and air-to-air missiles. It can also conduct reconnaissance and strike missions using the Vicon 18-601E reconnaissance pod inherited from the retired Cheetah fleet, while integration of the indigenous A-Darter missile would improve commonality with the Gripen.

The fleet is operated by 85 Combat Flying School at AFB Makhado, providing advanced jet training and weapons instruction for pilots progressing to 2 Squadron. Besides advanced pilot training, the Hawk participates in joint exercises, weapons evaluations and public air displays, while remaining available for limited operational and internal security tasks when required. Budget constraints have reduced flying hours and aircraft availability, although the Hawk remains essential to sustaining the SAAF's fighter training capability and Gripen pilot pipeline.

=== Intelligence, surveillance, target acquisition, and reconnaissance (ISTAR) ===
==== Milkor 380 ====
The Milkor 380 is a medium-altitude long-endurance (MALE) unmanned combat aerial vehicle (UCAV) developed by the South African company Milkor for intelligence, surveillance, reconnaissance, and strike missions. Unveiled in 2018, the aircraft completed its maiden flight in September 2023 and is the largest UAV yet developed in Africa. The SAAF has ordered an initial five systems for evaluation and operational testing, with the type expected to enter service from 2025. The aircraft is capable of carrying precision-guided weapons, ISR payloads, electronic warfare systems, and radar equipment, including a planned AESA synthetic aperture radar developed in cooperation with South Korea's Hanwha Systems.

Production is based at Milkor's facility in Cape Town, with plans to increase output to up to 16 systems per year. The programme places South Africa among the small number of countries capable of independently developing and producing a UAV of this class. Development is also underway on the larger Milkor 780 high-altitude long-endurance (HALE) UAV, which is expected to surpass the Milkor 380 in size and capability.

==== Cessna 208 ====
The Cessna 208 Caravan forms the core of the SAAF's intelligence, surveillance, target acquisition, and reconnaissance (ISTAR) capability, filling the gap left by the retirement of the Seeker UAV fleet in the early 2000s. Originally acquired as utility and liaison aircraft, 11 airframes were later upgraded under Project Koiler for surveillance and electronic warfare duties. The aircraft were fitted with the Argos 410-Z electro-optical system, thermal imaging equipment, laser rangefinding systems, datalink capability, and the MAPS targeting suite, allowing them to perform real-time reconnaissance and battlefield surveillance missions.

Operated by 41 Squadron, the Caravan is used for border safeguarding, internal surveillance, limited maritime patrol, and support operations, while still retaining secondary transport and utility roles. Its relatively low operating cost and adaptable mission equipment have allowed the aircraft to remain one of the SAAF's most practical surveillance platforms.

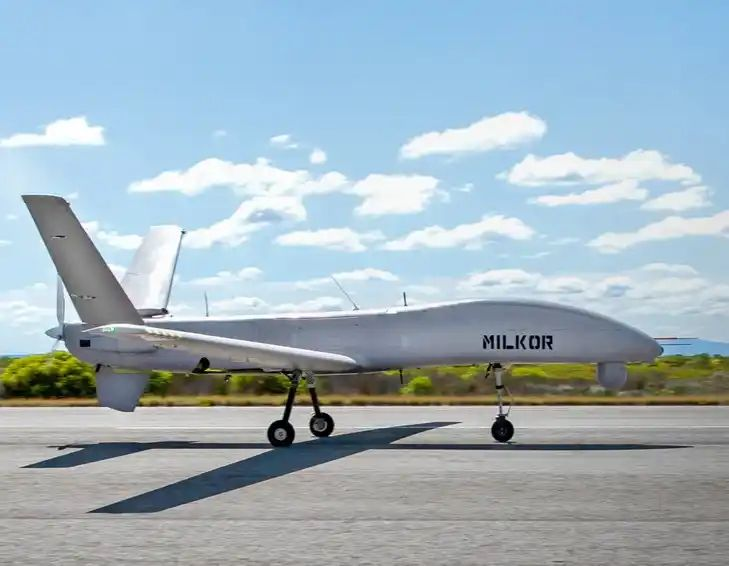
Milkor 380

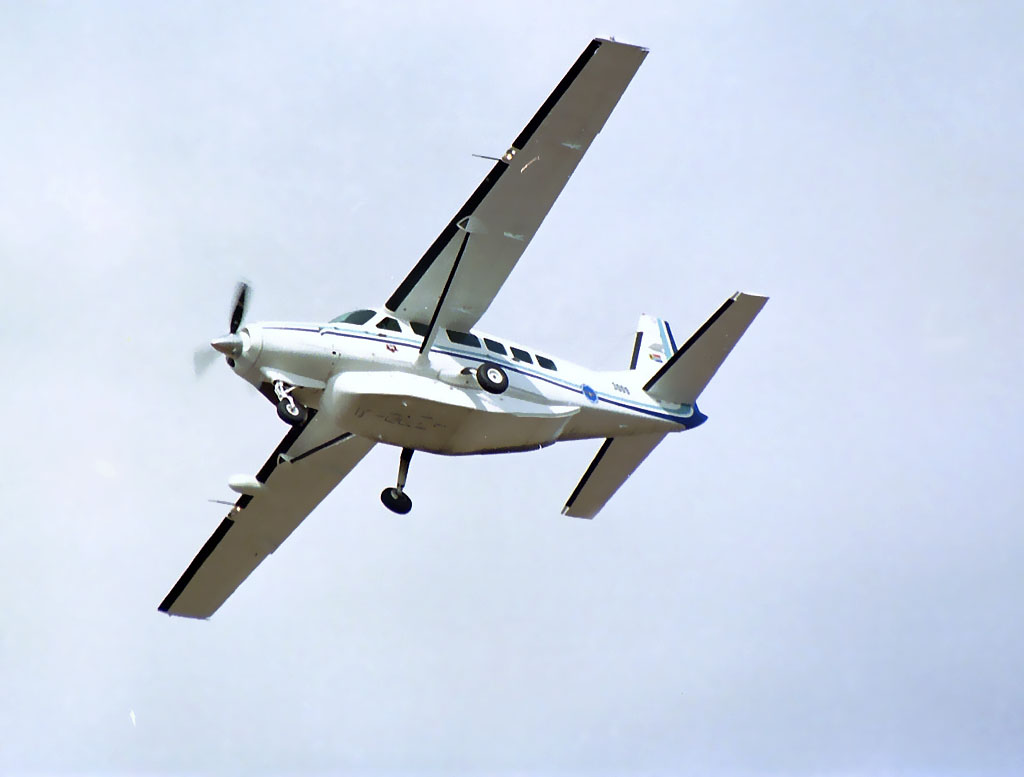
Cessna 208

=== Air mobility ===
==== C-130BZ Hercules ====
The Lockheed Martin C-130BZ Hercules serves as the SAAF's primary tactical and strategic airlift aircraft, operated by 28 Squadron at AFB Waterkloof. The first seven C-130B Hercules entered SAAF service from 1963, with the fleet later expanded in the late 1990s through additional aircraft obtained from the United States under the Excess Defense Articles programme, including two ex-USAF C-130B models and three ex-US Navy C-130F models. However, only the two additional B-models and one F-model briefly entered service, while the remaining F-models were never commissioned due to airframe condition and upgrade costs. During the 2000s, the fleet was upgraded to the C-130BZ standard under Project Ebb, introducing modern avionics, digital cockpit systems, updated navigation equipment, and self-protection systems to extend the aircraft's operational lifespan.

The Hercules fleet is used for tactical airlift, troop deployment, cargo transport, humanitarian relief, peacekeeping support, and parachute operations across Africa and beyond. The aircraft has played a major role in regional operations, disaster relief missions, and long-range logistical support for SANDF deployments. A total of 12 Hercules airframes were acquired across all variants, although only 10 entered operational service. As of 2025, around six aircraft remain capable of being returned to airworthy condition, with the rest either withdrawn from service, written off, or used for spare parts.

Despite extensive upgrades, the C-130BZ fleet is now more than 60 years old and has faced increasing maintenance and availability problems. The SAAF originally planned to replace the Hercules with the Airbus A400M Atlas under a joint acquisition programme, but the project was cancelled in 2009 following cost increases and delivery delays. Since then, the Embraer C-390 Millennium has emerged as a possible long-term replacement for the ageing Hercules fleet.

==== C-212 Aviocar ====
The CASA C-212 Aviocar is operated by 44 Squadron and serves mainly in light transport, airborne operations, and general utility roles. Four aircraft were inherited in 1994 from the former homeland defence forces of Bophuthatswana, Transkei, and Venda, and have remained in SAAF service since then. Its STOL capability and rugged design allow it to operate from short and unprepared airstrips, making it useful for cargo transport, paratrooping, reconnaissance, casevac, and other support duties.

==== Super King Air ====
The SAAF operates four Beechcraft Super King Air 200 and 300 series aircraft through 41 Squadron at AFB Waterkloof, mainly for light transport, liaison, and limited reconnaissance duties. The fleet has received upgrades over the years, including modern Garmin G1000 avionics and refurbished interiors. The aircraft are regularly used for routine transport tasks, airborne support operations, and general logistical duties in both day and night conditions.

==== Pilatus PC-12 ====
The Pilatus PC-12 is operated by 41 Squadron at AFB Waterkloof and is mainly used for personnel transport, VIP movement, and medical evacuation duties. Entering service in 1997, the aircraft features a flexible cabin layout capable of carrying passengers, cargo, or stretchers for medical support missions. As of 2025, the SAAF operates a single PC-12, making it one of the smaller but still useful aircraft in the fixed-wing transport fleet.

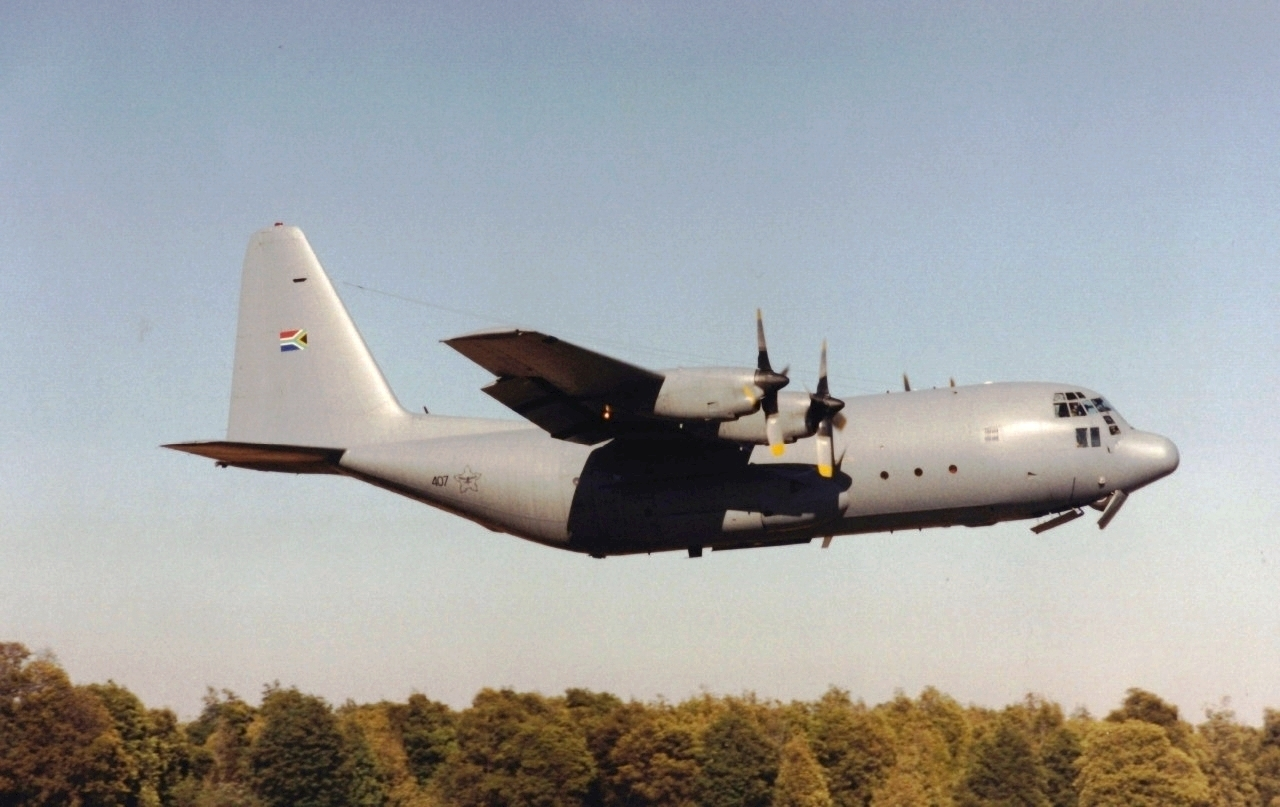
C-130BZ Hercules

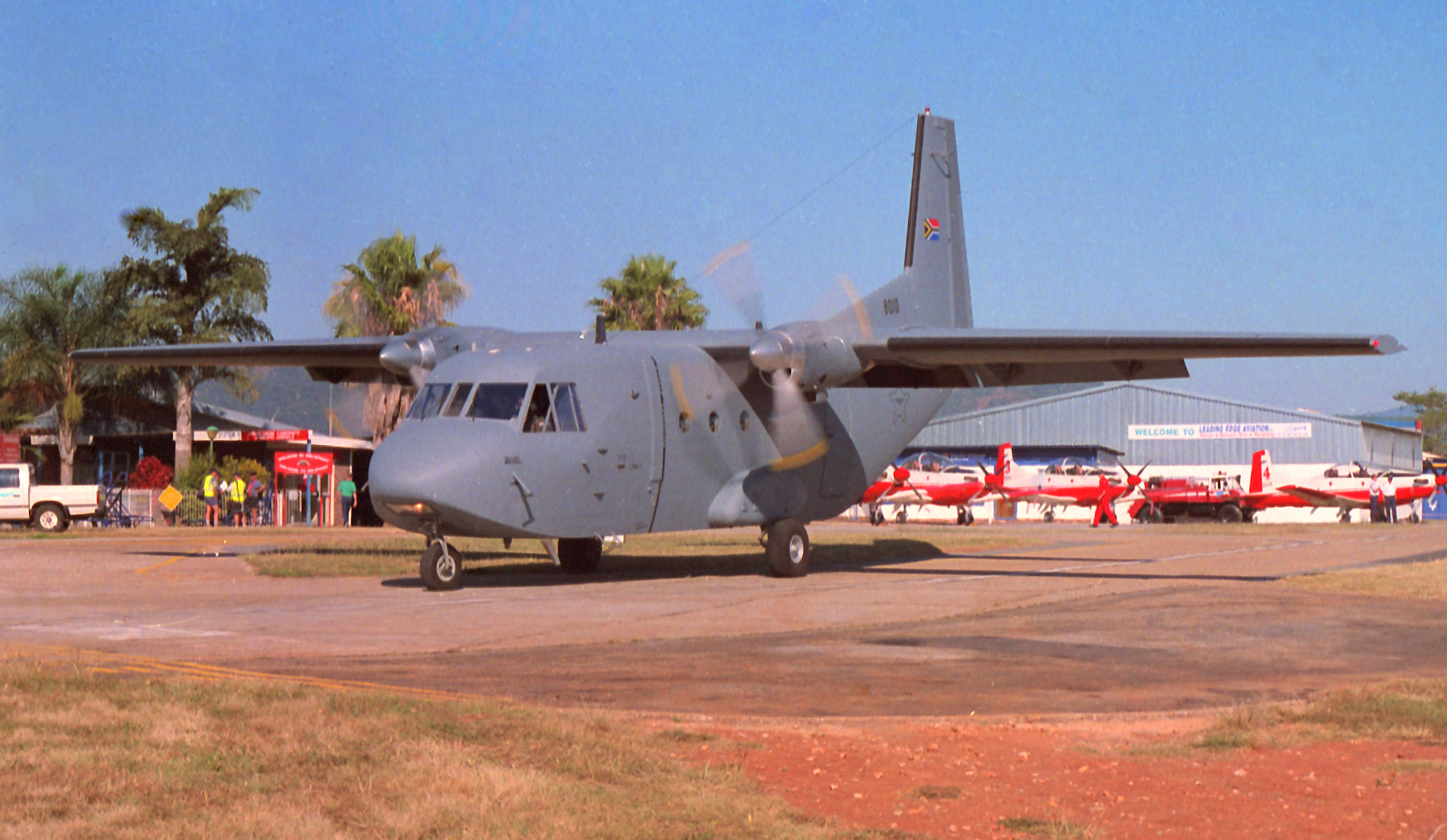
C-212 Aviocar

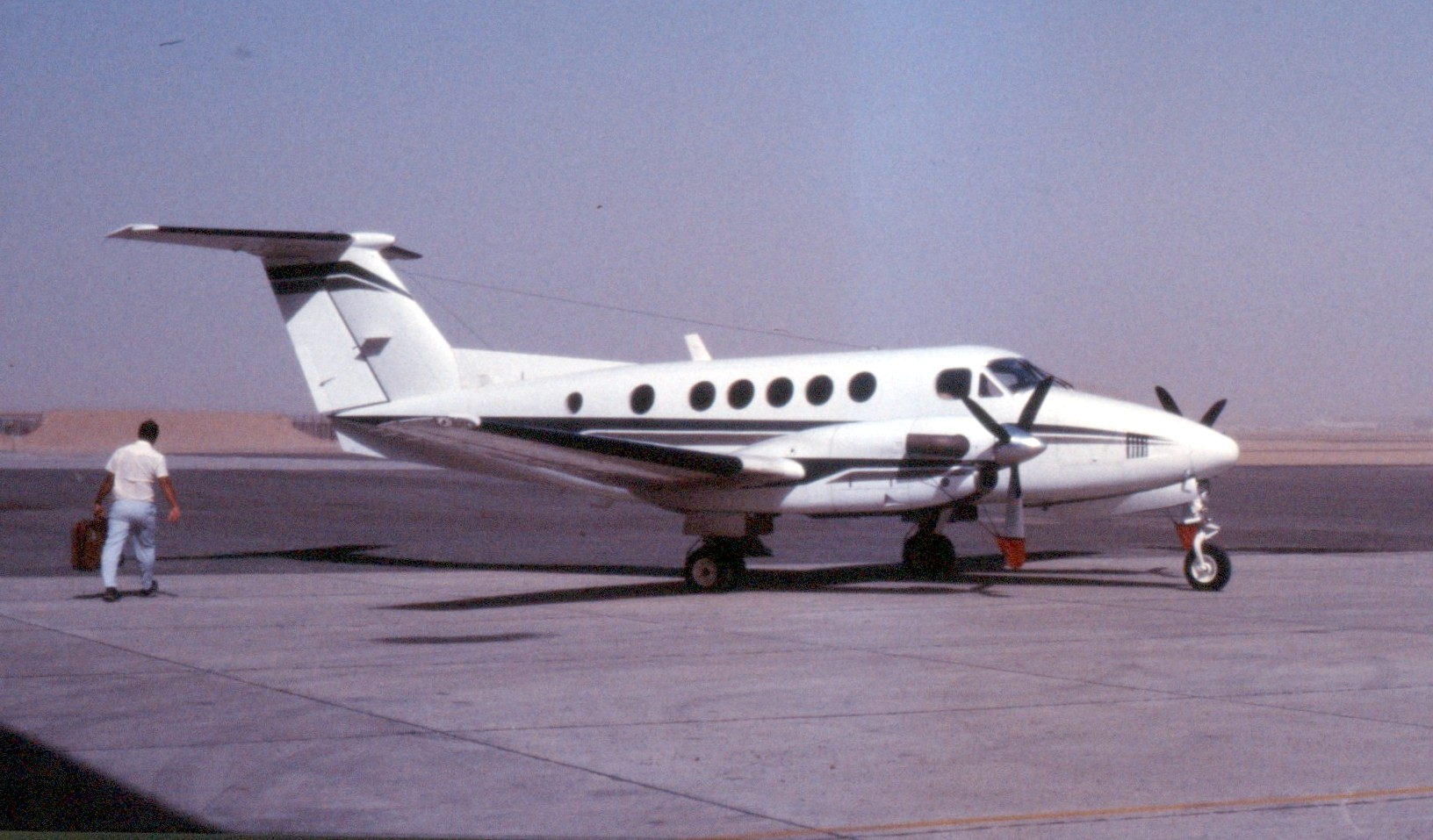
Super King Air

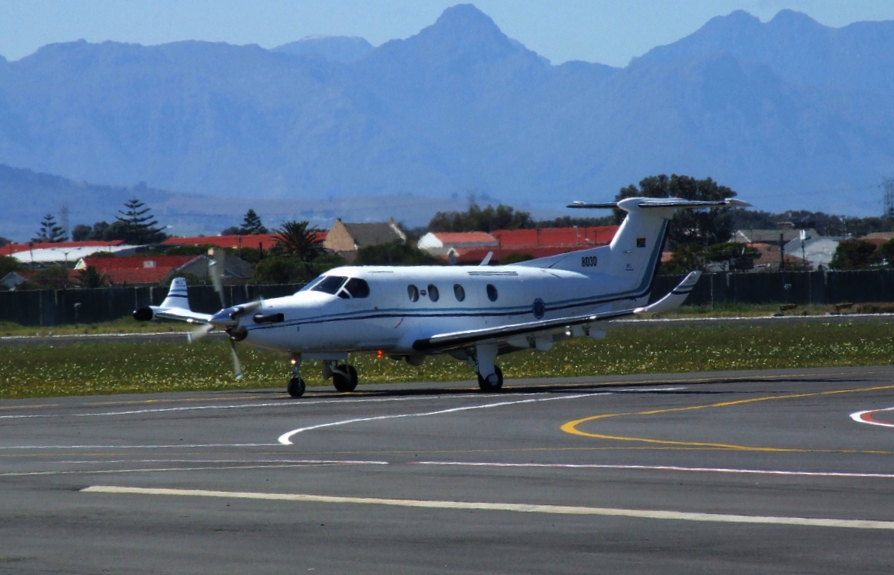
Pilatus PC-12

=== VIP Transport ===
==== Boeing 737 (BBJ) ====
The Boeing 737, nicknamed Inkwazi and operated by 21 Squadron at AFB Waterkloof, serves as the SAAF's primary VIP transport aircraft, primarily used for presidential travel and high-level government delegations. As the largest aircraft in the VIP fleet, it provides long-range capability and secure onboard communications suited for state-level missions.

==== Citation II ====
The Cessna Citation II fleet, consisting of two aircraft operated by 21 Squadron, provides light VIP transport and ministerial travel for government officials. Its compact size and efficiency make it suitable for short-range missions and regional engagements.

==== Falcon 50 ====
The Dassault Falcon 50, with two aircraft in service under 21 Squadron, is used for VIP and executive transport, serving senior government officials and foreign dignitaries. Its tri-jet configuration and extended range offer flexibility for both domestic and continental travel.

==== Falcon 900 ====
Also operated by 21 Squadron, the Dassault Falcon 900 is the sole example in the SAAF fleet and complements the Falcon 50 by providing long-range VIP airlift and secure government transport. It features advanced avionics and a spacious cabin tailored for senior leadership mobility.

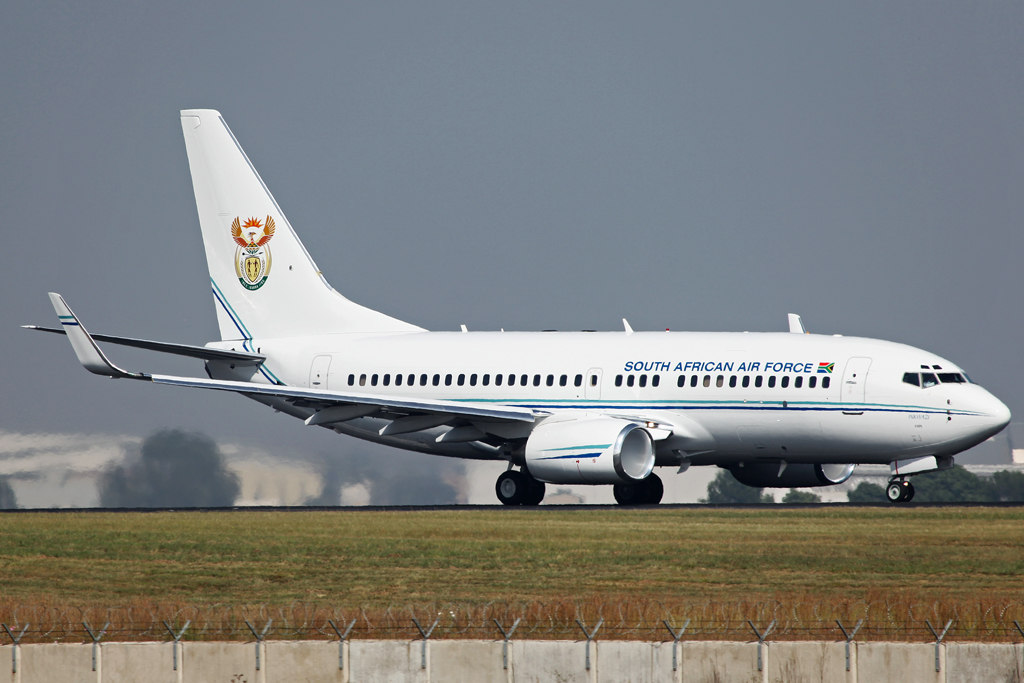
Boeing 737

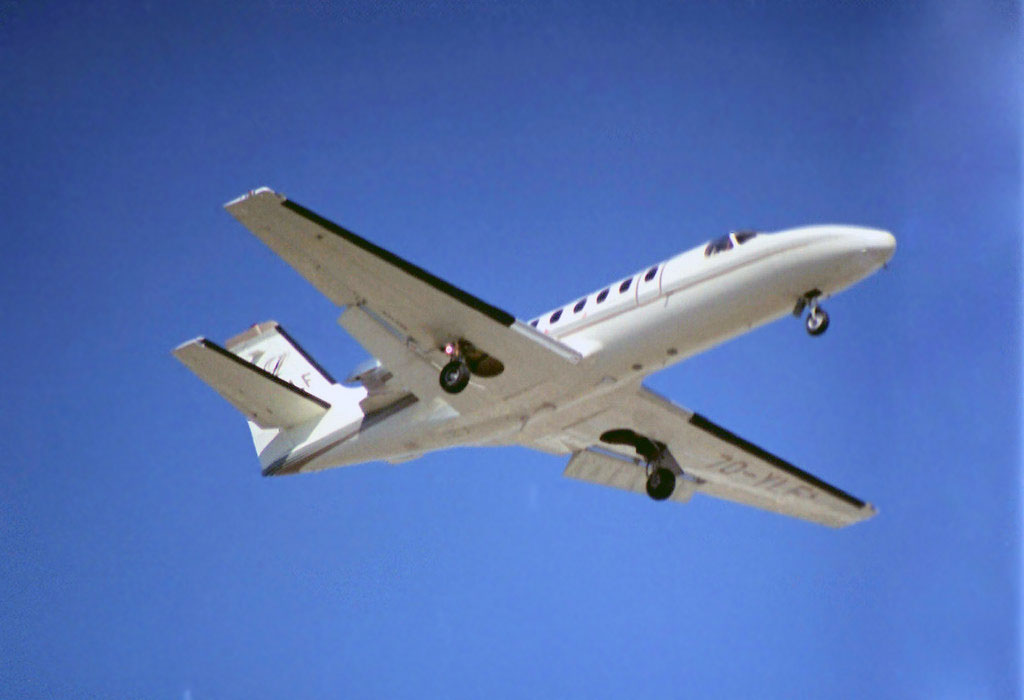
Citation II

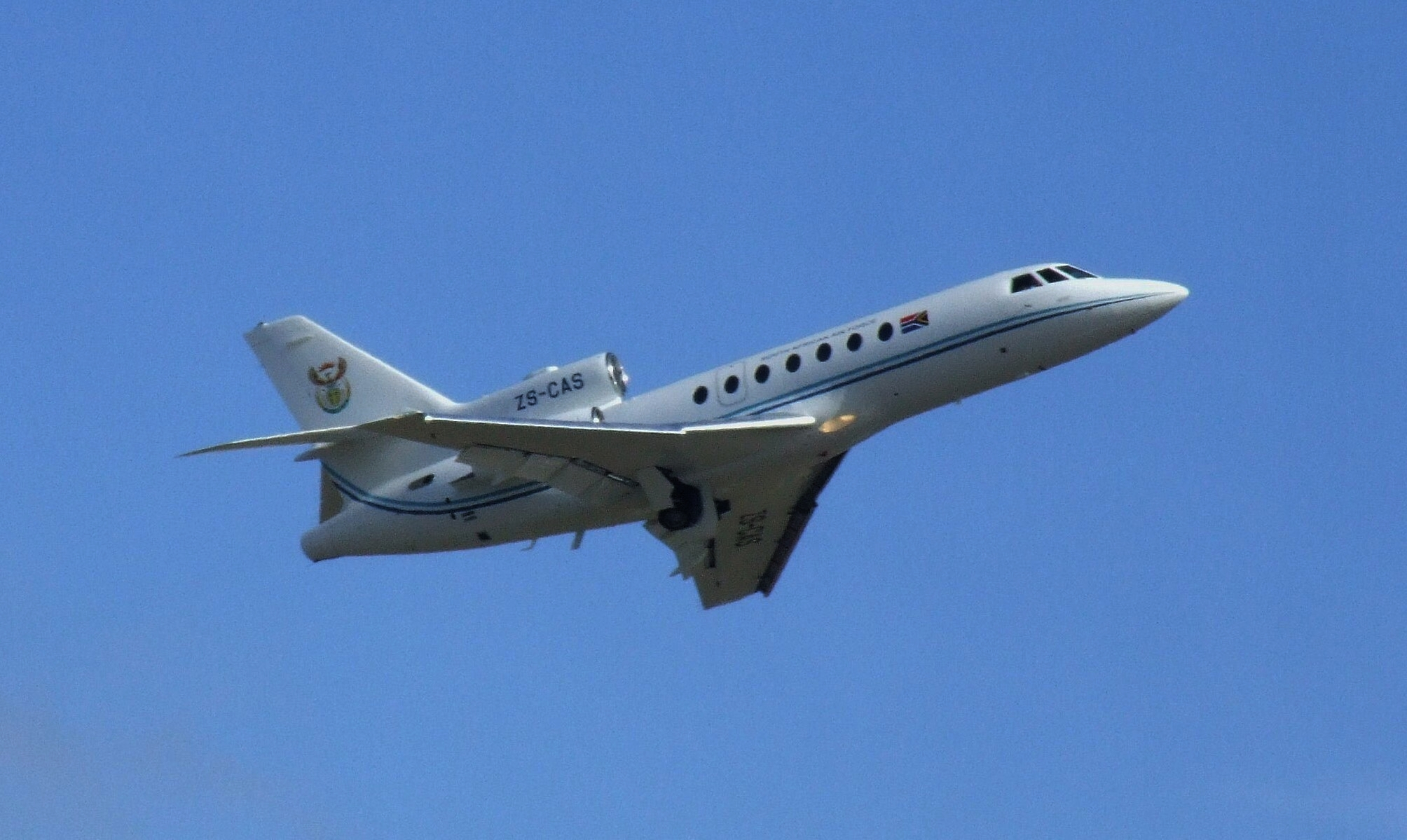
Falcon 50

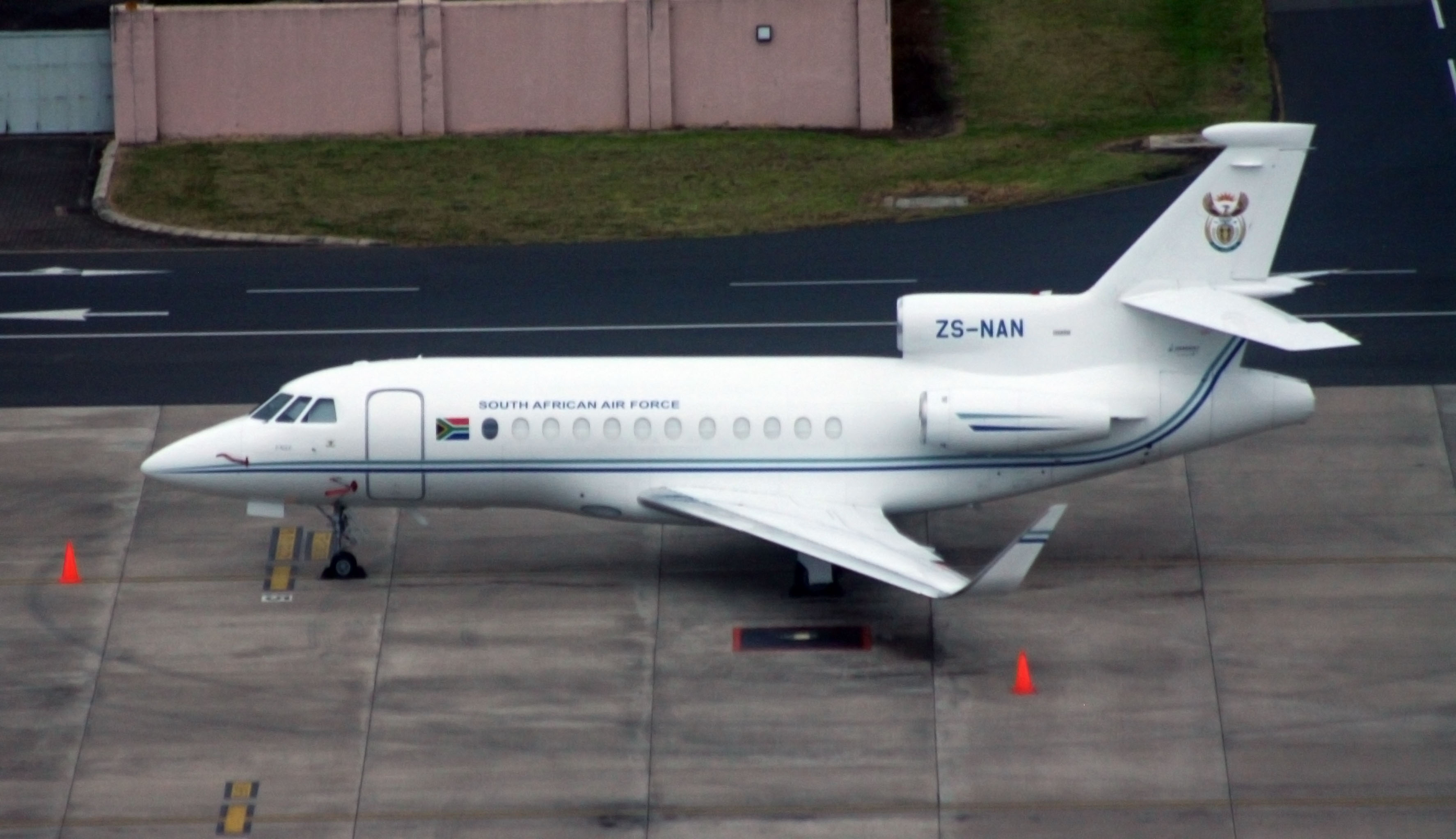
Falcon 900

=== Maritime patrol ===
==== C-47TP Turbo Dakota ====
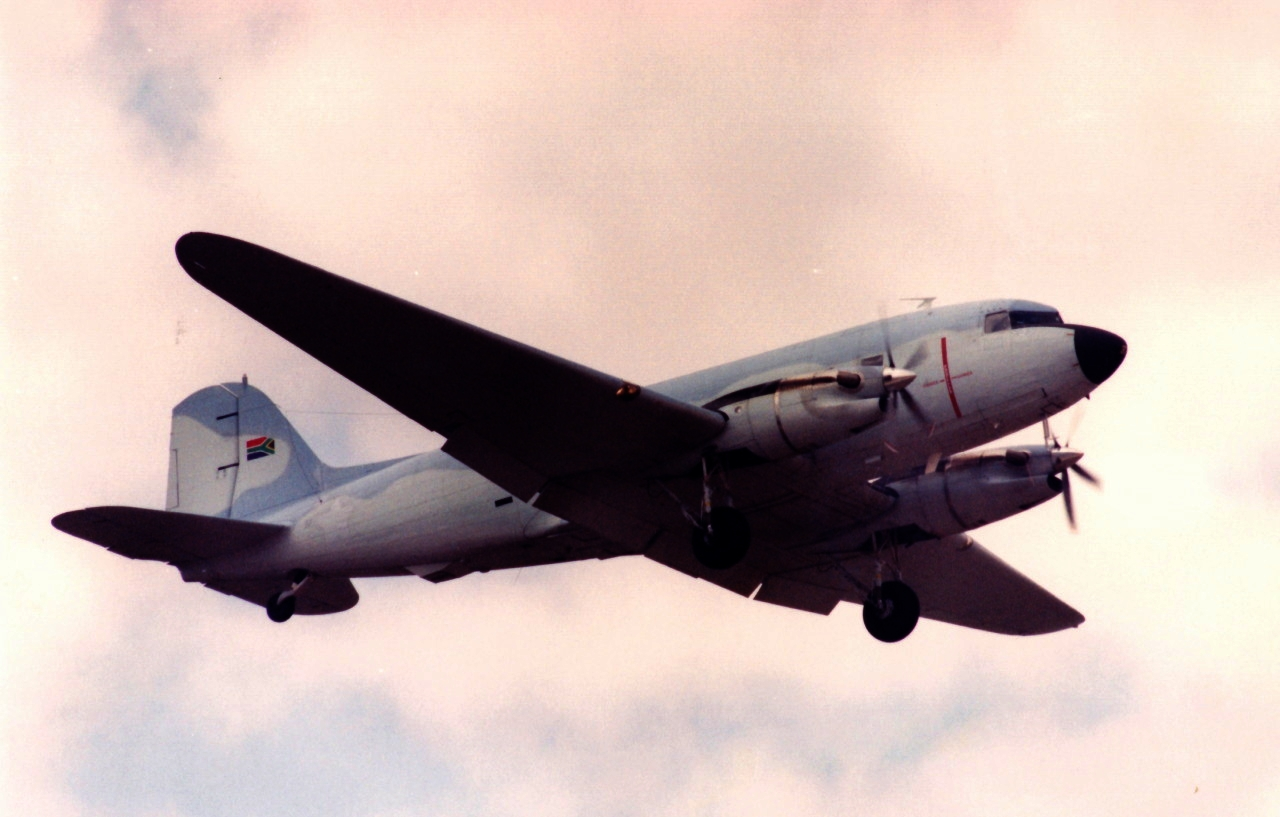
C-47TP Turbo Dakota

The C-47TP Turbo Dakota serves as the SAAF's primary maritime patrol aircraft, operated mainly by 35 Squadron at AFB Ysterplaat. The SAAF originally received 84 C-47 Dakotas during the Second World War, with additional aircraft later acquired through transfers, surplus purchases, and replacement airframes over the following decades. During the 1990s, 39 surviving aircraft were upgraded under Project Felstone to C-47-TP Turbo Dakota standard. The upgrade introduced Pratt & Whitney Canada turboprop engines, strengthened airframes, updated avionics, and modern navigation systems, significantly extending the operational life of the Dakota fleet.

The C47TP is used for maritime patrol, cargo transport, paratrooping, search and rescue, and general support operations across Southern Africa and surrounding maritime regions. Maritime patrol variants were equipped with surveillance radar and sensor systems for coastal and exclusive economic zone patrol duties. Although the aircraft remained reliable and relatively cost-effective in service for many years, parts of the fleet were gradually retired due to ageing airframes, maintenance difficulties, and budget constraints. Several replacement programmes were considered over the years, including more modern maritime patrol and transport aircraft, although none progressed beyond the planning stage. By the mid-2020s, it was reported that none of the remaining C-47TPs were operational, with ongoing safety and airworthiness concerns further affecting the fleet's future in SAAF service.

=== Helicopters ===
==== Rooivalk ====
The Denel Rooivalk is the SAAF's primary combat support helicopter, operated by 16 Squadron at AFB Bloemspruit. Developed by the Atlas Aircraft Corporation (now Denel Aeronautics) during the Border War to meet a requirement for a dedicated attack helicopter, the programme began in 1984 and the first prototype flew in 1990. Although the original requirement called for 36 helicopters, post-apartheid defence cuts reduced procurement to 12 aircraft, of which 11 remain in service after one was lost in an accident. The Rooivalk entered operational service with the SAAF in 2011 and was upgraded to the Block 1F standard between 2011 and 2013, introducing improved avionics, fire-control, and precision-guided weapon capability. It made its first combat debut in 2013 during South African participation in United Nations operations in the Democratic Republic of the Congo, where it provided highly accurate close air support, reconnaissance and escort missions against M23 rebels. A further mid-life modernisation programme is planned to extend the fleet's operational capability.

Powered by two Turbomeca Makila 1K2 turboshaft engines, the Rooivalk has a maximum speed of 309 km/h and is designed for sustained operations in harsh African conditions with little to no ground support. It is typically armed with a nose-mounted 20 mm F2 automatic cannon and can carry up to 16 Mokopa anti-tank guided missiles, four Mistral air-to-air missiles, and 76 FZ70 70 mm or FZ90 90 mm unguided rockets. The helicopter is supported by an advanced fire-control system, electronic warfare suite, helmet-mounted sight and stabilised electro-optical targeting system, while also being qualified to employ the FZ275 Laser-Guided Rocket (LGR). It is employed in reconnaissance, armed escort, close air support and anti-armour operations.

==== Oryx ====
The Atlas Oryx is the SAAF's primary medium transport helicopter, operated by 15, 17, 19 and 22 Squadrons. South Africa acquired 66 Aérospatiale SA 330 Puma helicopters from France between 1972 and 1977 before the international arms embargo, with the fleet serving extensively during the Border War. Following the embargo, Atlas Aircraft Corporation developed the Oryx as a heavily redesigned and locally manufactured derivative of the Puma, combining the original airframe with AS332 Super Puma components to improve performance in Africa's hot-and-high operating conditions. First flown in 1987, 51 Oryx helicopters were produced. In 2006 the remaining fleet of 39 underwent a mid-life modernisation under Project Drummer, followed by avionics and navigation upgrades under Project Drummer II, while a limited number of specialised aircraft are equipped with electronic warfare jamming systems. The Oryx is employed for troop transport, medical evacuation, search and rescue, humanitarian assistance and special operations.

==== A109 ====
The Agusta A109M Light Utility Helicopter (LUH) serves in a light transport and utility role with the SAAF, operated by 15, 17 and 19 Squadrons, as well as 87 Helicopter Flying School. A total of 30 aircraft were acquired under Project Flange, with 25 assembled locally by Denel Aeronautics and the remainder built in Italy. Designed as a fast multirole platform, the A109M is employed for reconnaissance, liaison, command and control, medical evacuation, patrol, search and rescue, and light transport duties, while retaining a limited light attack capability. The helicopter is equipped for day and night operations, with self-sealing fuel tanks and ballistic-resistant rotor blades to improve survivability. The programme was affected by delivery delays, technical issues and several accidents that resulted in the option for 10 additional aircraft not being exercised.

==== BK 117 ====
The MBB/Kawasaki BK 117 forms part of the SAAF's light utility helicopter fleet, mainly operated by 15 Squadron. The fleet of eight aircraft is used for search and rescue, medical evacuation, liaison, and general utility missions. Its simple design and reliability make it well suited for routine operations where more complex platforms are not required. In some configurations, the BK 117 can also be fitted with light armament for limited support roles.

==== Super Lynx ====
The Westland Super Lynx 300 Mk 64 operates in a maritime helicopter role with 22 Squadron, embarked on the South African Navy's Valour-class frigates. The fleet of four aircraft is configured for anti-submarine warfare (ASW), reconnaissance, maritime patrol, and utility missions. Equipped with radar, electro-optical systems, and self-protection suites, the Super Lynx supports naval operations, shipborne deployments, and maritime security tasks, including hoisting and limited cargo transfer capability.

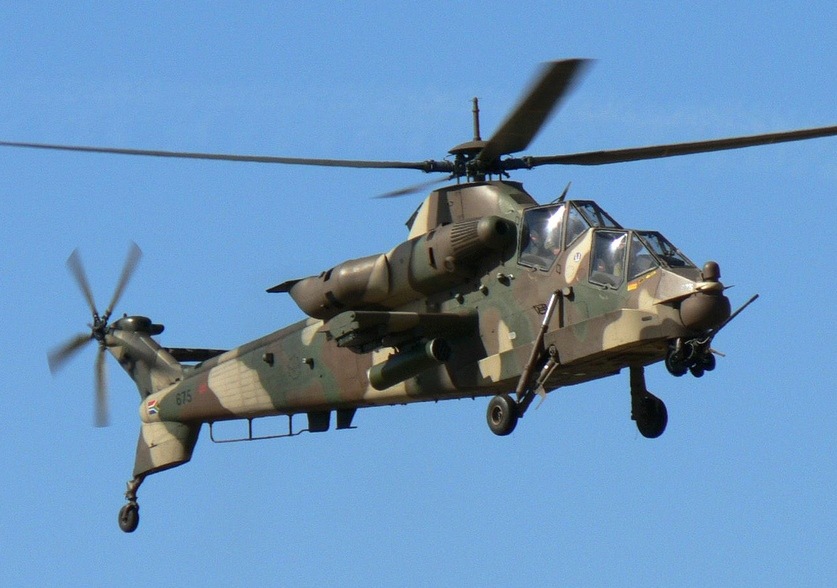
Denel Rooivalk

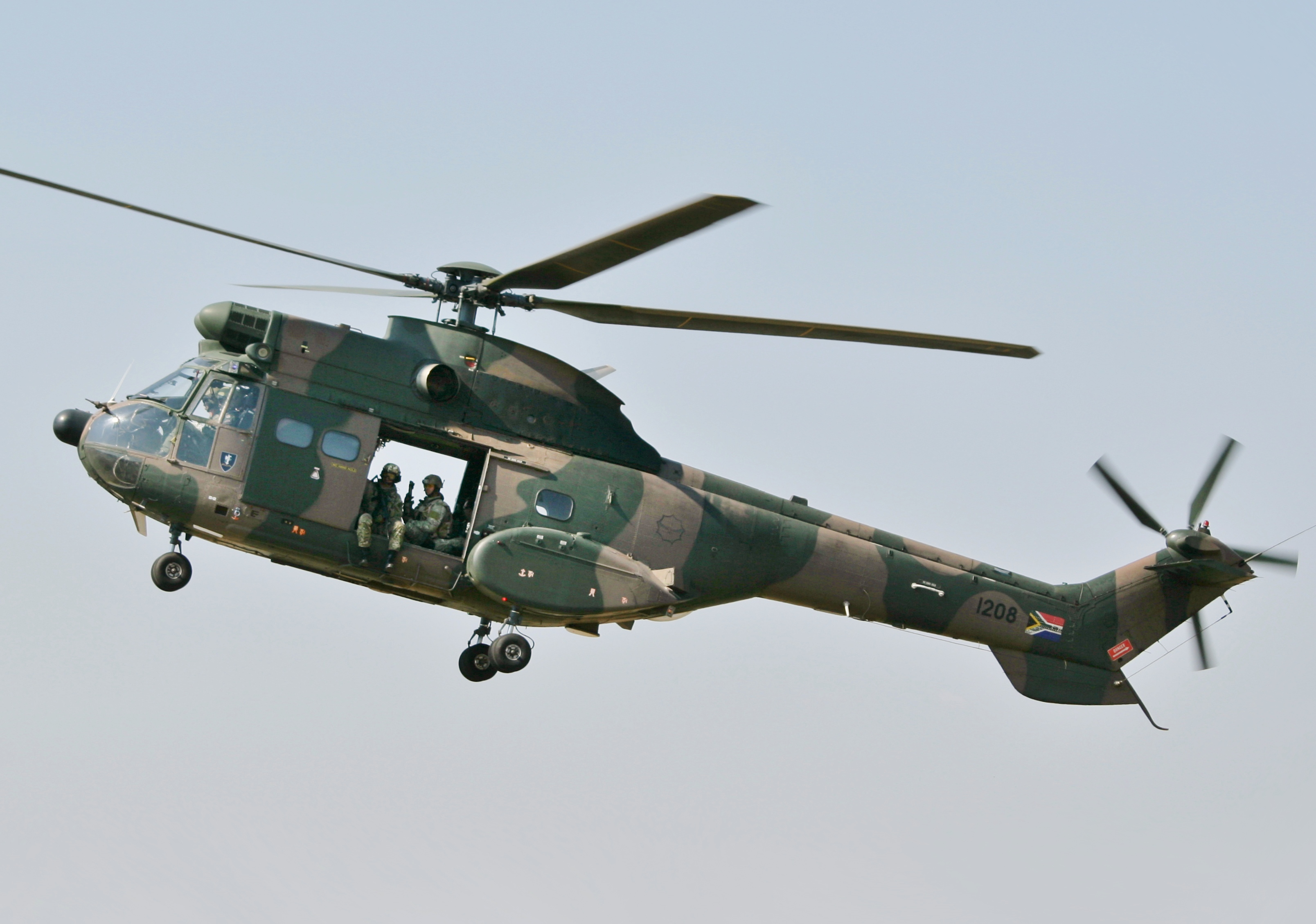
Atlas Oryx

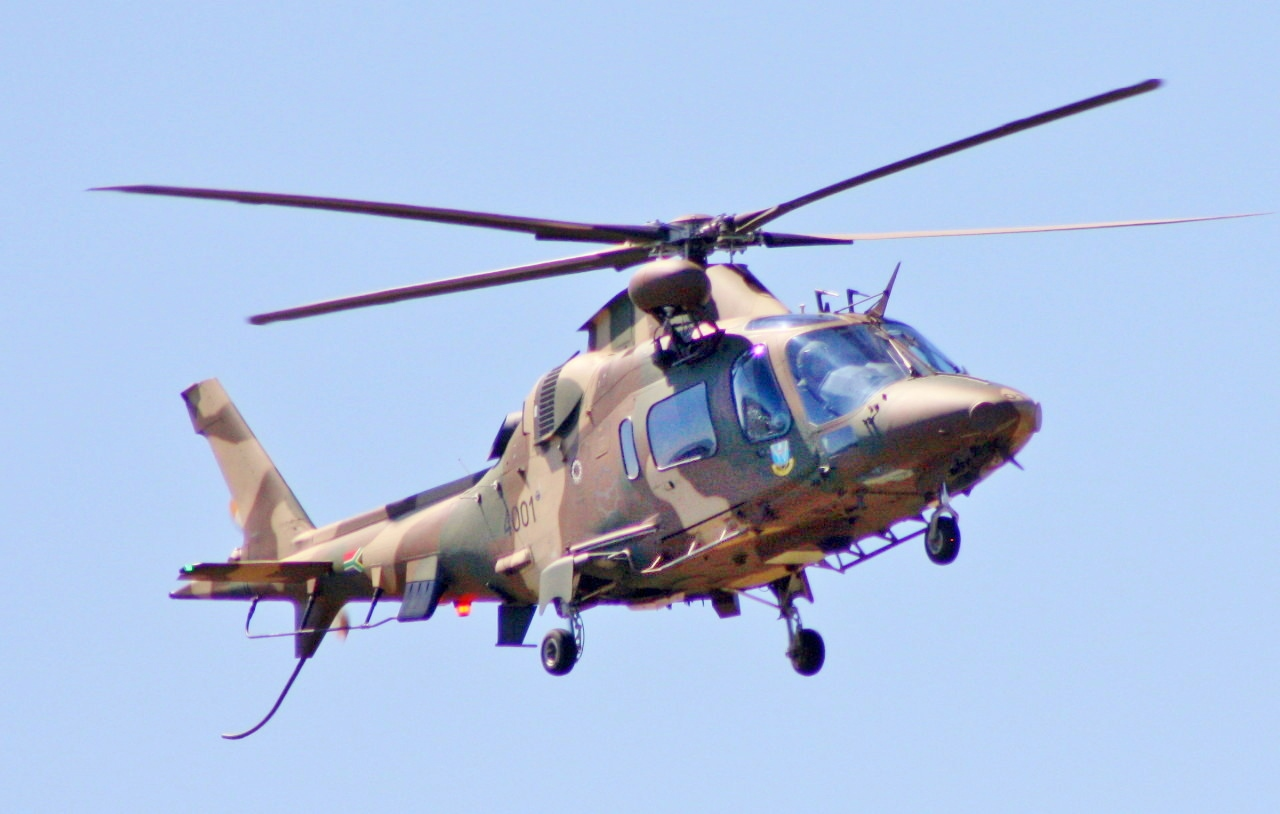
Agusta A109

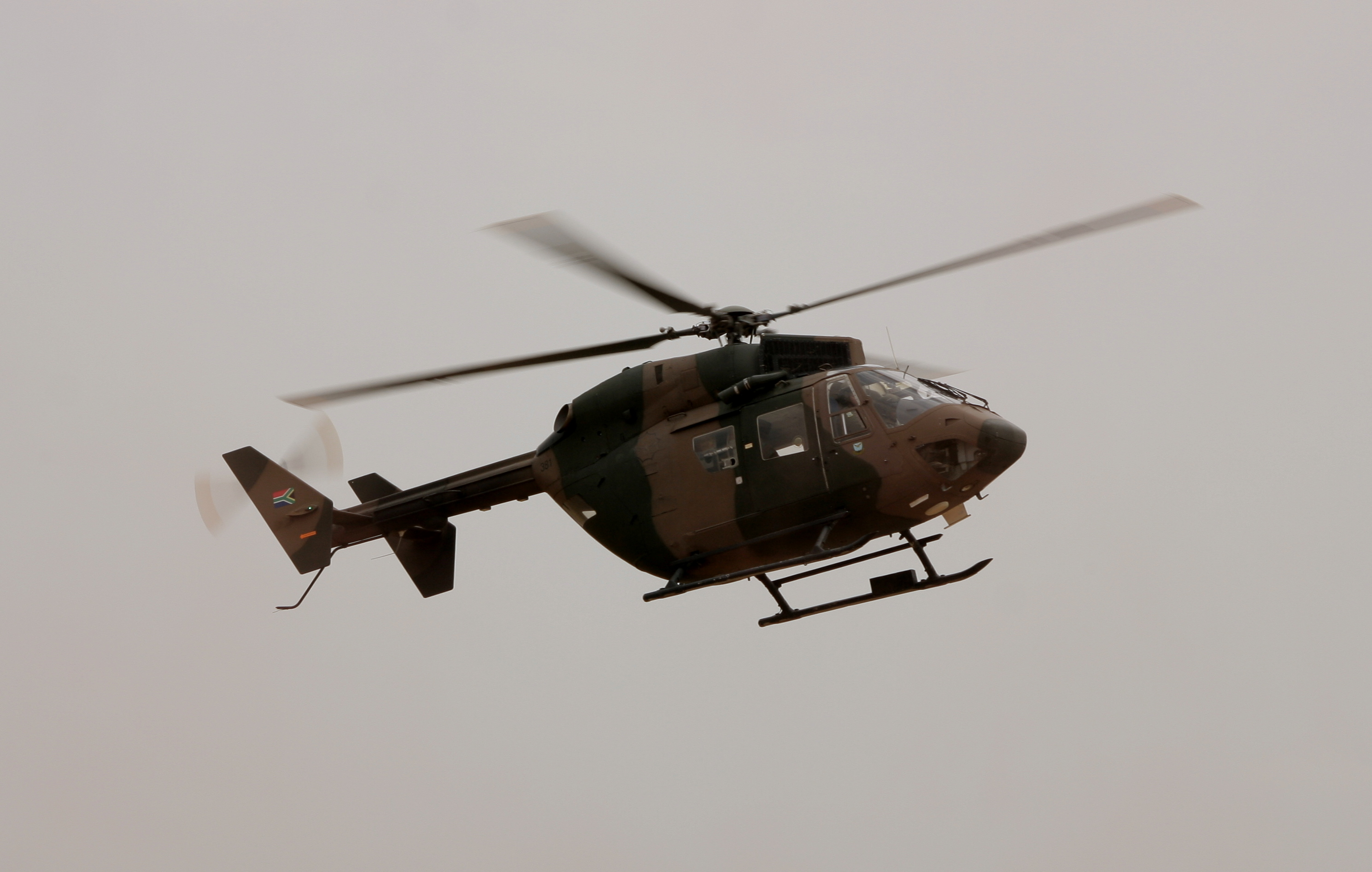
BK 117

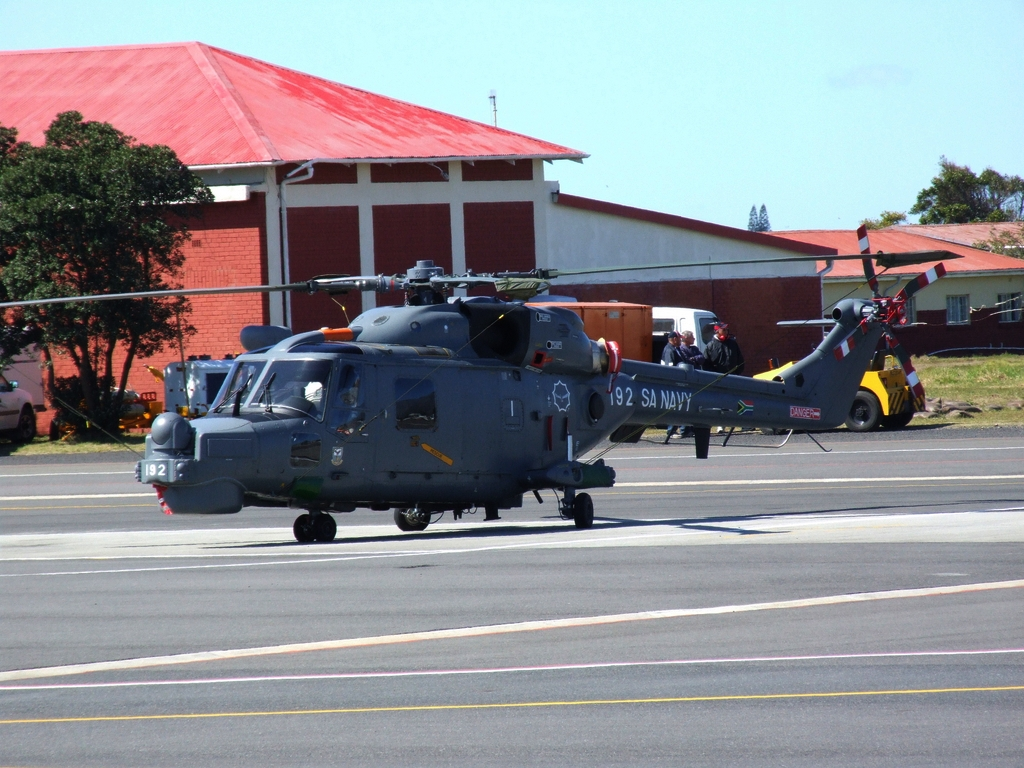
Westland Super Lynx

=== Training aircraft ===
The South African Air Force conducts pilot and aircrew training through a structured, tiered system that progresses from basic flight instruction through to advanced fast-jet, multi-engine, and helicopter qualifications. Training is supported by a mix of fixed-wing and rotary-wing aircraft, simulators, and squadron-level operational conversion units, preparing pilots for frontline service in a relatively small but capability-focused air force.

==== Basic training ====
The Pilatus PC-7 Mk I, introduced in the 1980s, served as the SAAF's primary basic trainer for many years and, although still listed in the inventory, now remains largely in reserve and is seldom flown due to reduced pilot intake and the shift to the upgraded Mk II standard. These aircraft are retained for limited use, reactivation, or surge training capacity if required. The PC-7 Mk II Astra, introduced through the upgrade of Mk I airframes, is the current basic training platform operated by the Central Flying School at AFB Langebaanweg. It features updated avionics and improved performance, forming the first stage of the pilot training pipeline before progression to fast-jet training.

==== Advanced fast-jet training ====
The BAE Systems Hawk Mk 120, operated by 85 Combat Flying School at AFB Makhado, provides advanced jet training and lead-in fighter training (LIFT). It bridges the gap between basic turboprop instruction and frontline fighter operations on the Gripen, training pilots in tactical flying, air combat manoeuvring, weapons employment, and operational procedures in a realistic combat environment.

==== Operational conversion training ====
The two-seat Gripen D is used as the operational conversion platform for pilots transitioning from the Hawk to the single-seat Gripen C. While fully combat-capable, its primary role is to provide final-stage fighter training, systems familiarisation, and operational readiness preparation before pilots are assigned to frontline squadron duties.

==== Rotary training ====
Helicopter pilot training in the SAAF is conducted internally rather than through a separate joint training school, using operational units to develop pilots from basic to mission-ready standards:

- A109 – Used for basic and intermediate helicopter training, including navigation, formation flying, night operations, and light utility flying.
- BK 117 – Used for practical utility training such as search and rescue profiles, medical evacuation procedures, and general mission handling.
- Oryx – Used for advanced rotary-wing training, including multi-engine operations, troop transport, hoisting, air assault support, and large-scale logistical flying.

This system allows the SAAF to train pilots across fighter, transport, and rotary streams within a compact structure, while still maintaining operational relevance through squadron-based conversion and training.

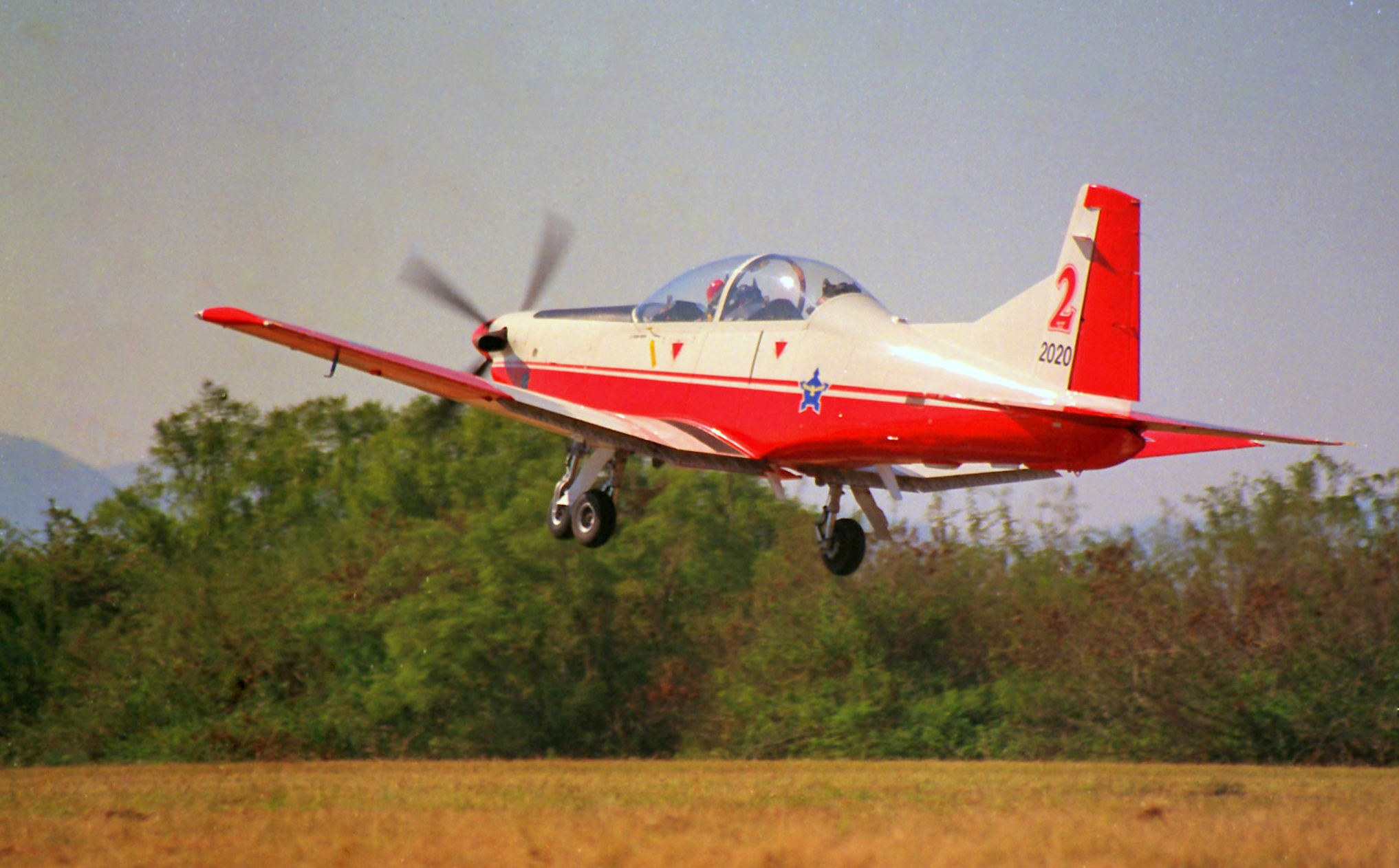
PC-7 Mk II Astra

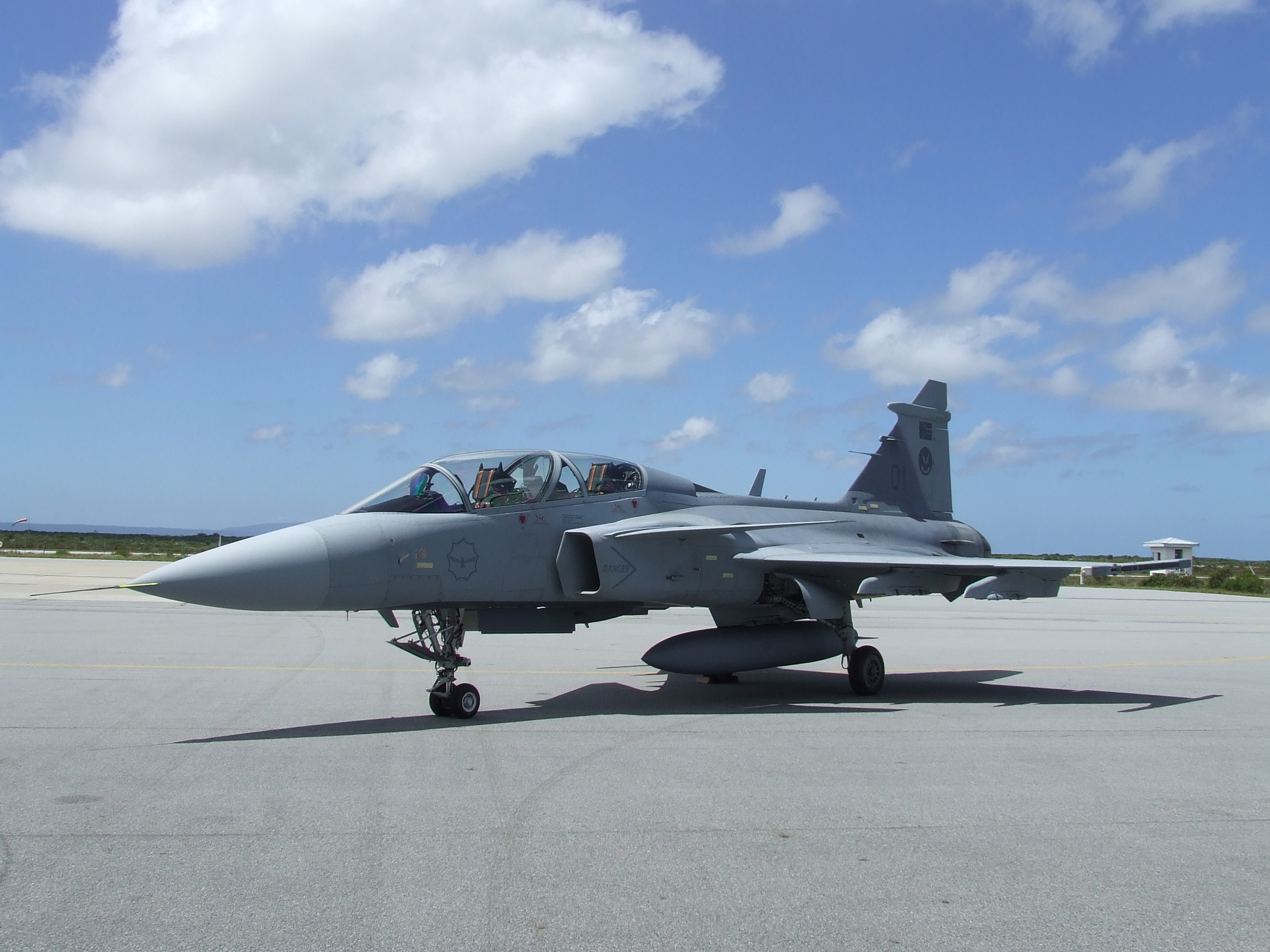
Gripen D

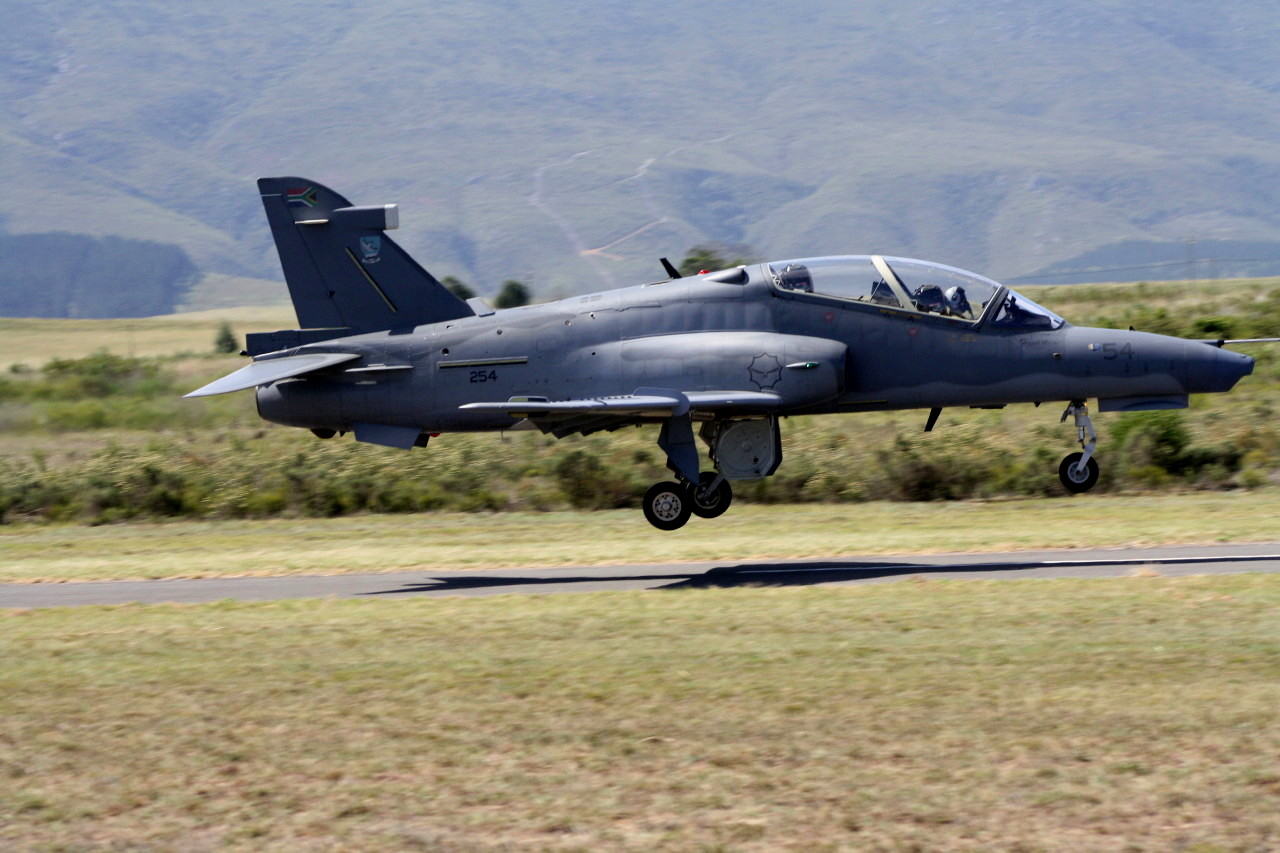
Hawk Mk 120

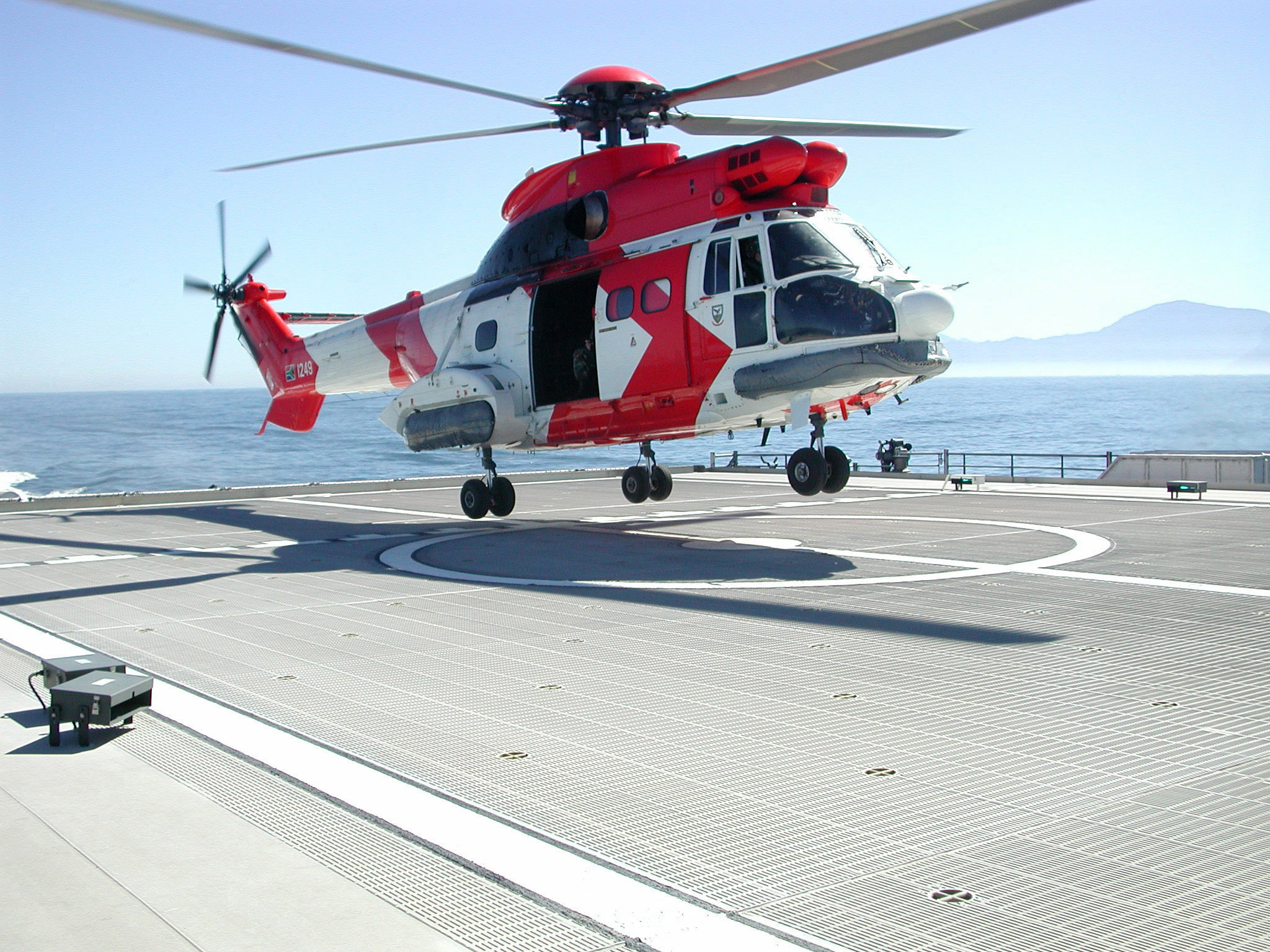
Oryx

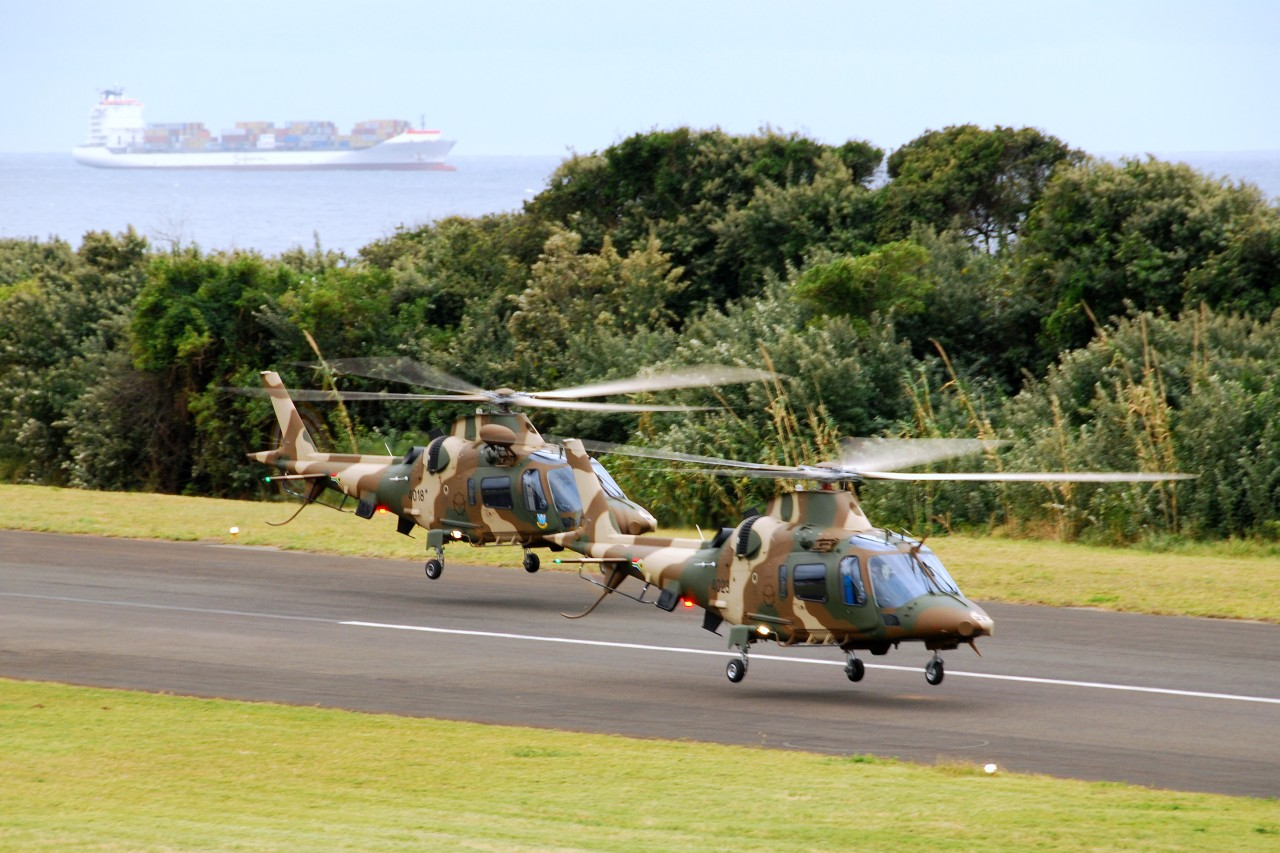
AW109

=== Retired ===
Alongside its current inventory, the South African Air Force has retired a wide range of aircraft that previously formed the core of its combat, transport, training, and maritime capabilities. These aircraft played a major role during the Border War era and throughout the Cold War period, forming the foundation of the SAAF's modern force structure and shaping its transition into a smaller, more cost-constrained air force focused on selective capability retention.

For a list of all the aircraft the SAAF has retired over the years, see: List of historic aircraft of the South African Air Force.

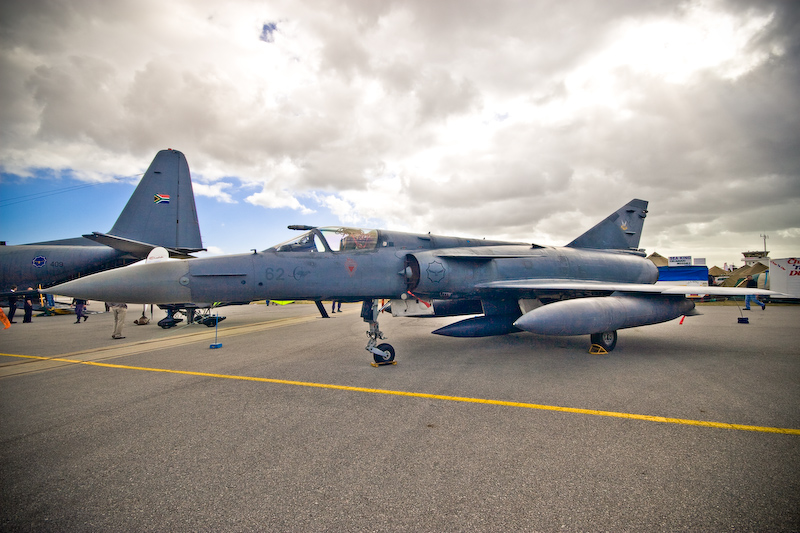
Cheetah

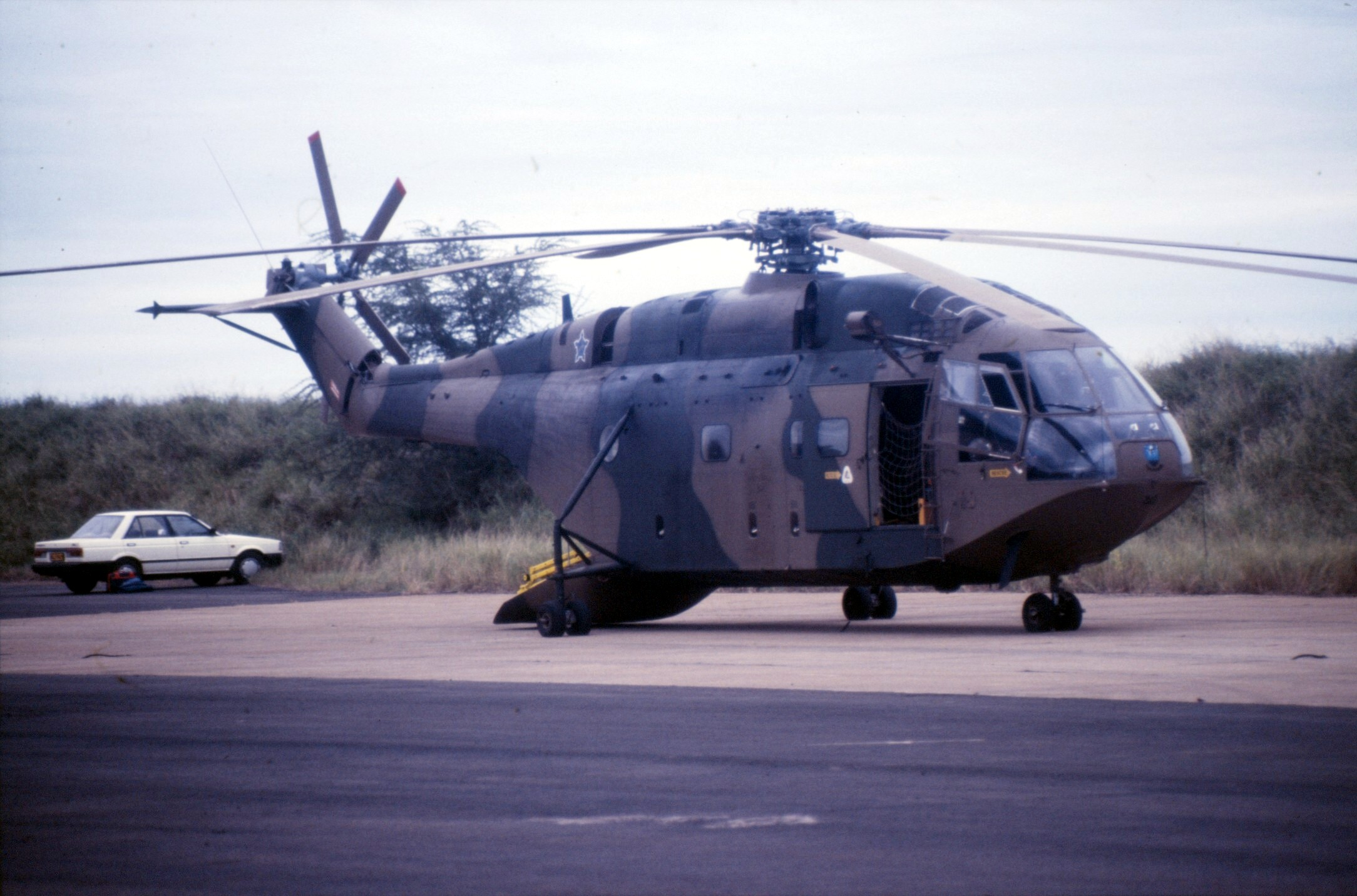
Super Frelon

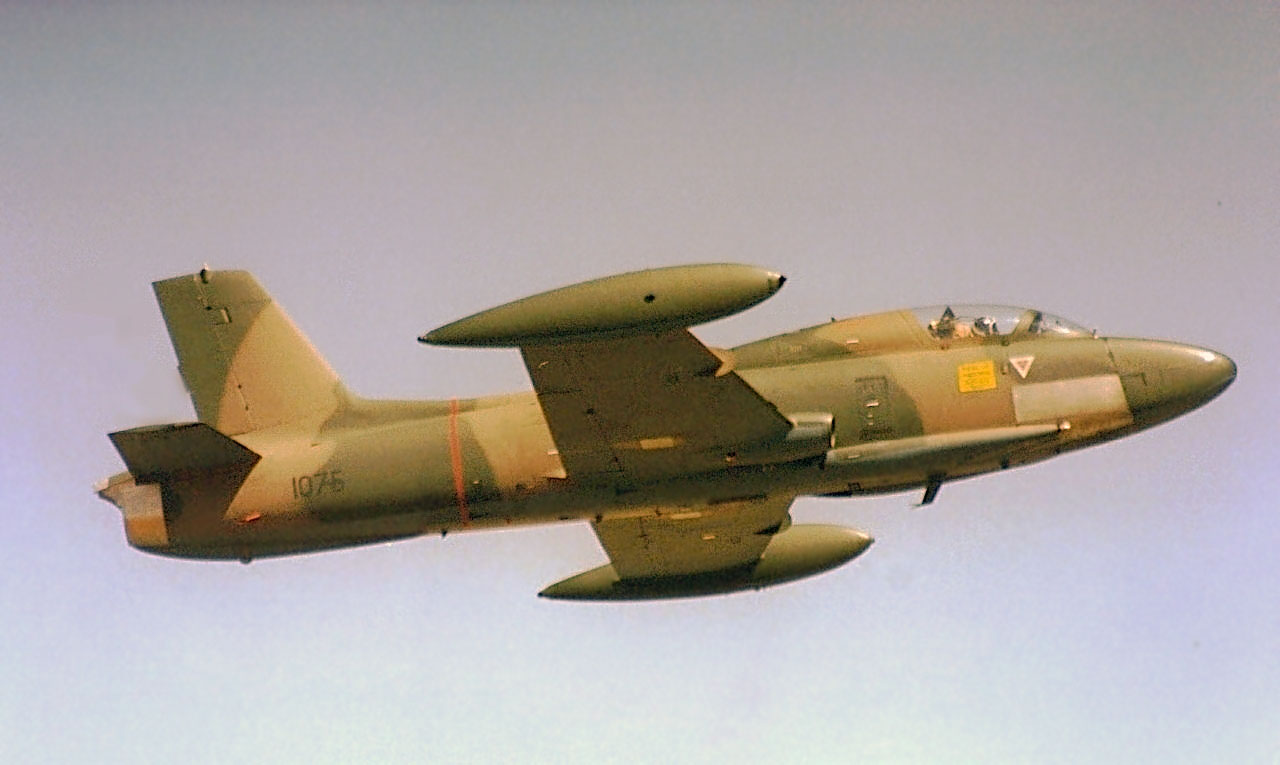
Impala

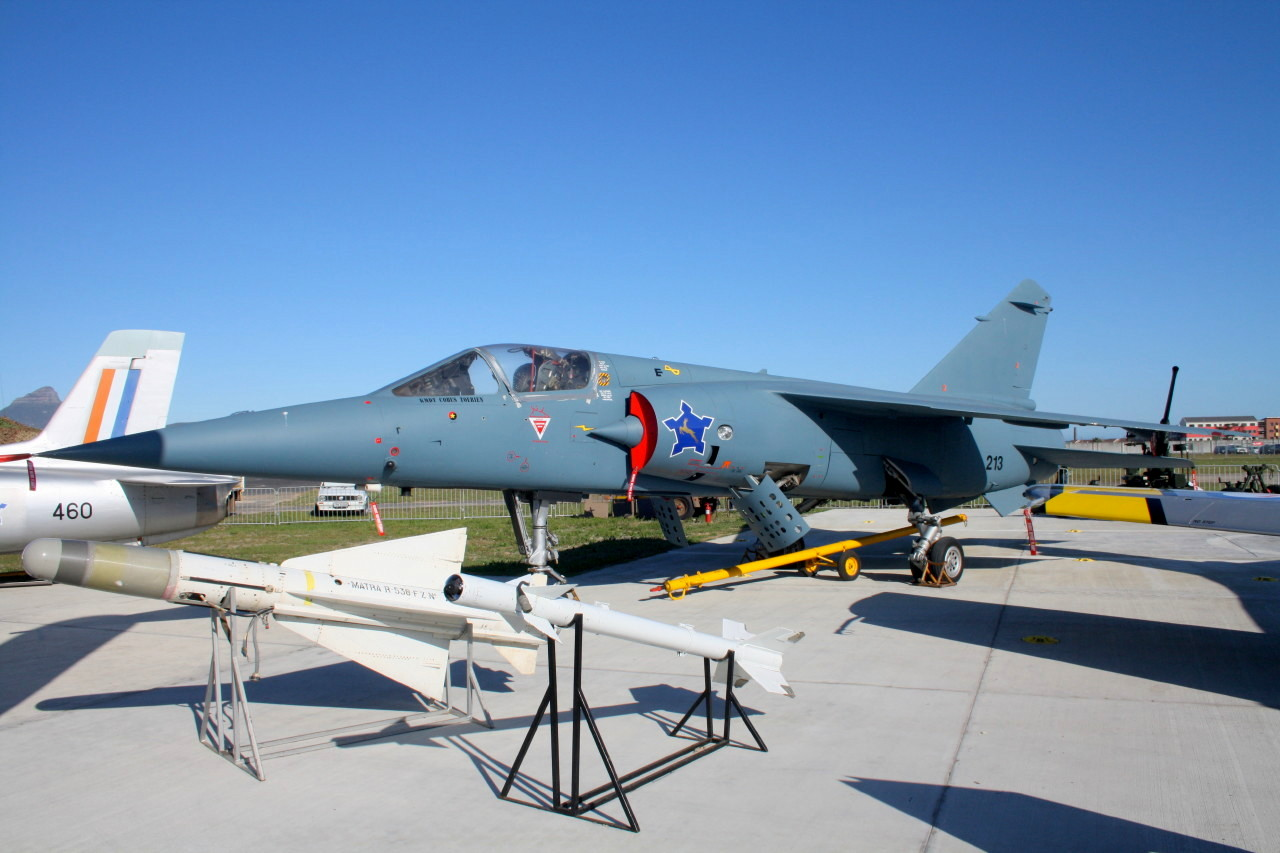
Mirage F1

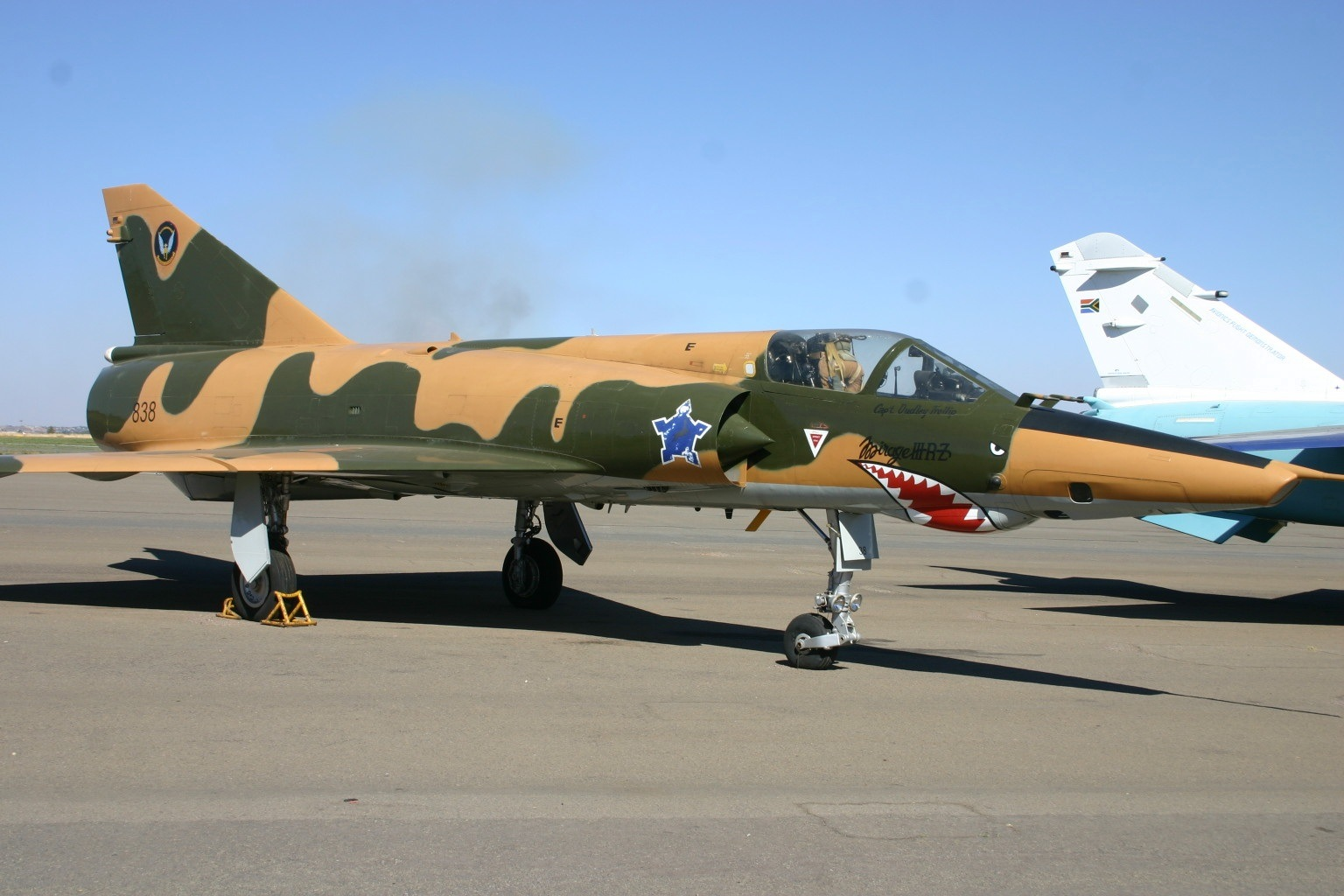
Mirage III

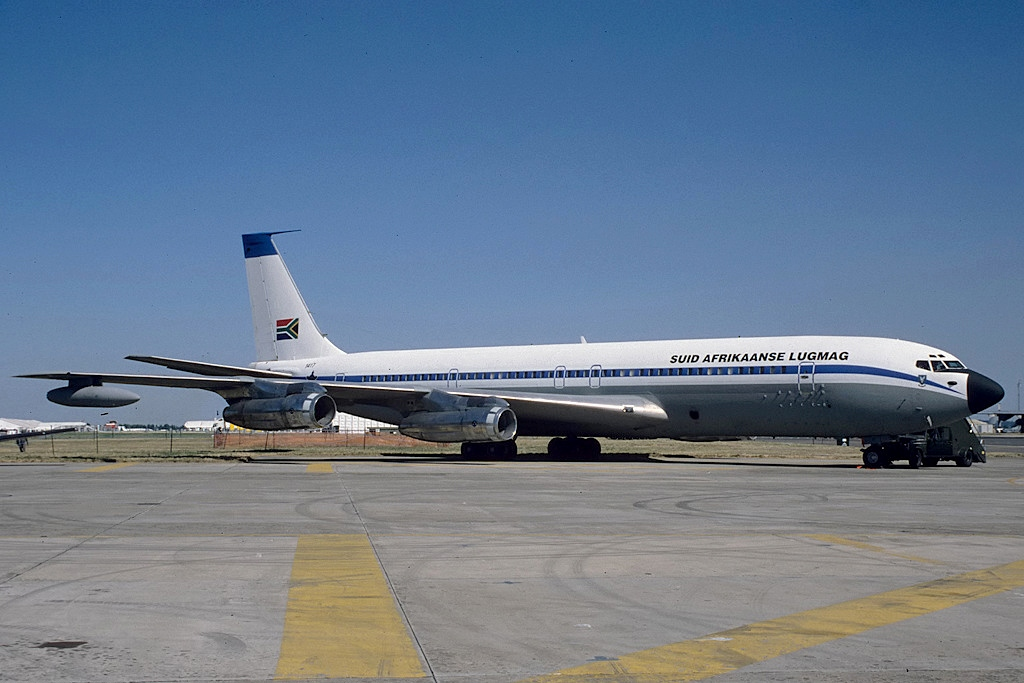
KC-707

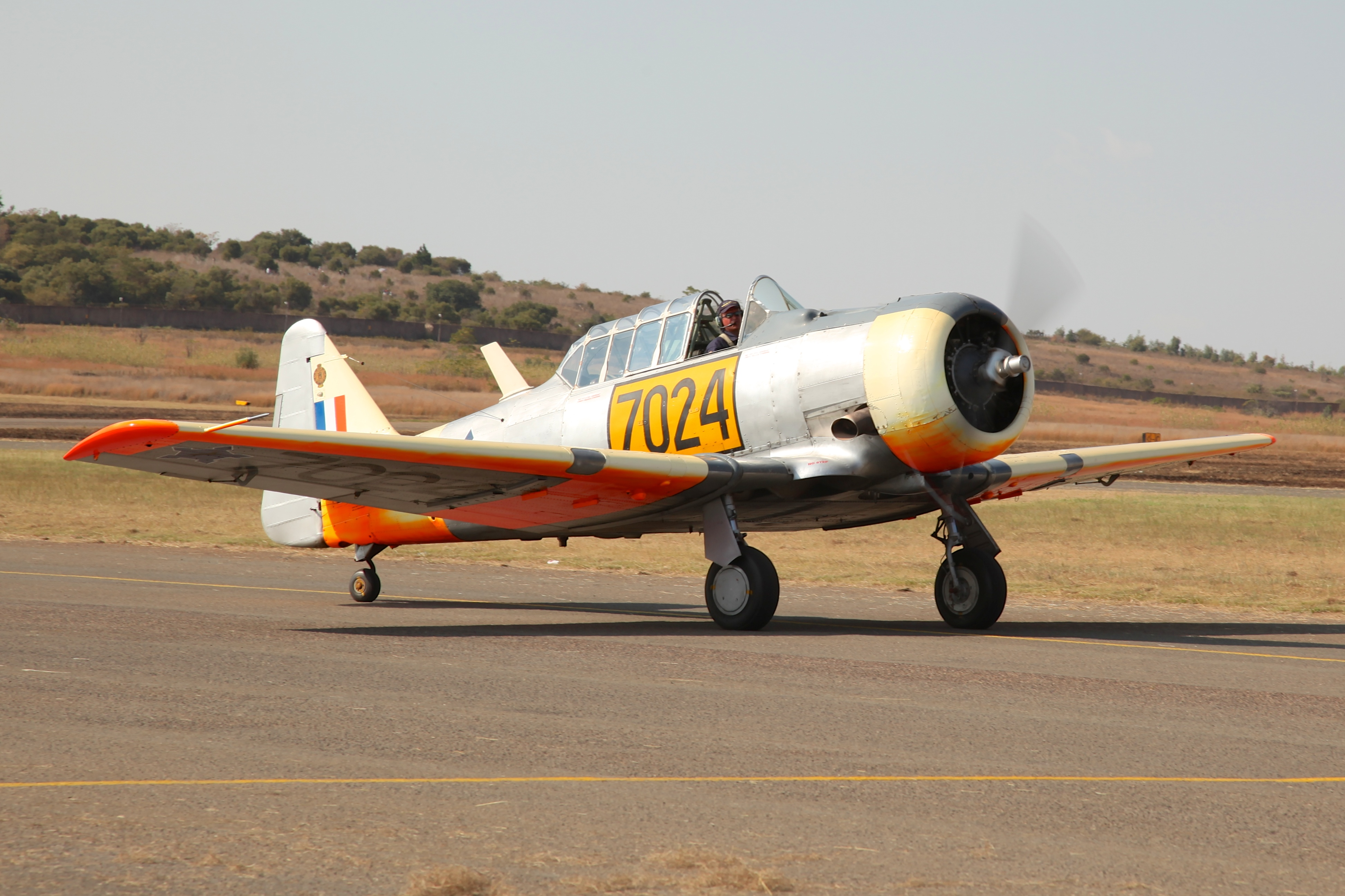
T-6 Harvard

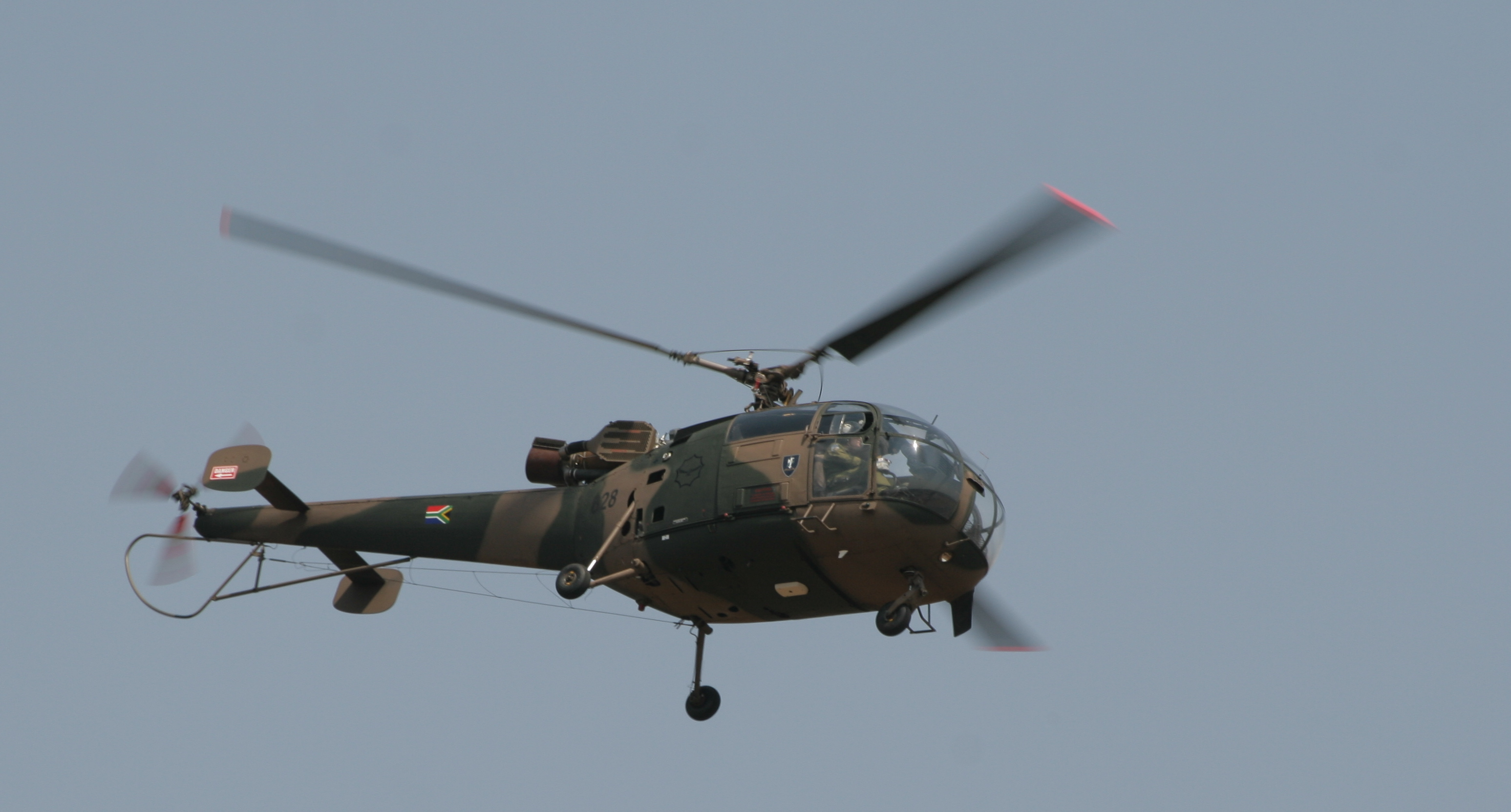
Alouette III

=== Weapon systems ===
For weapon systems no longer in use, see: List of obsolete weapon systems of the South African Air Force.

=== Air Force Mobile Deployment Wing ===
The Air Force Mobile Deployment Wing (AFMDW) provides combat ready, integrated and deployable air support capabilities to the South African National Defence Force. The AFMDW consists of 18 Deployment Support Unit, Mobile Communications Unit, 140 Squadron and 142 Squadron, 500 Squadron and 501 Squadron.

=== Reserves ===
The Air Force Conventional Reserves are a pool of reserve posts created to serve the SAAF and augment regular units as and when needed. All trades in the SAAF are represented in the reserves, e.g. pilots, security squadron personnel etc. The Air Force Territorial Reserve currently consists of nine squadrons of privately owned aircraft operated by reserve pilots on behalf of the SAAF who assist in light transport and observation roles.

== Other establishments and units ==
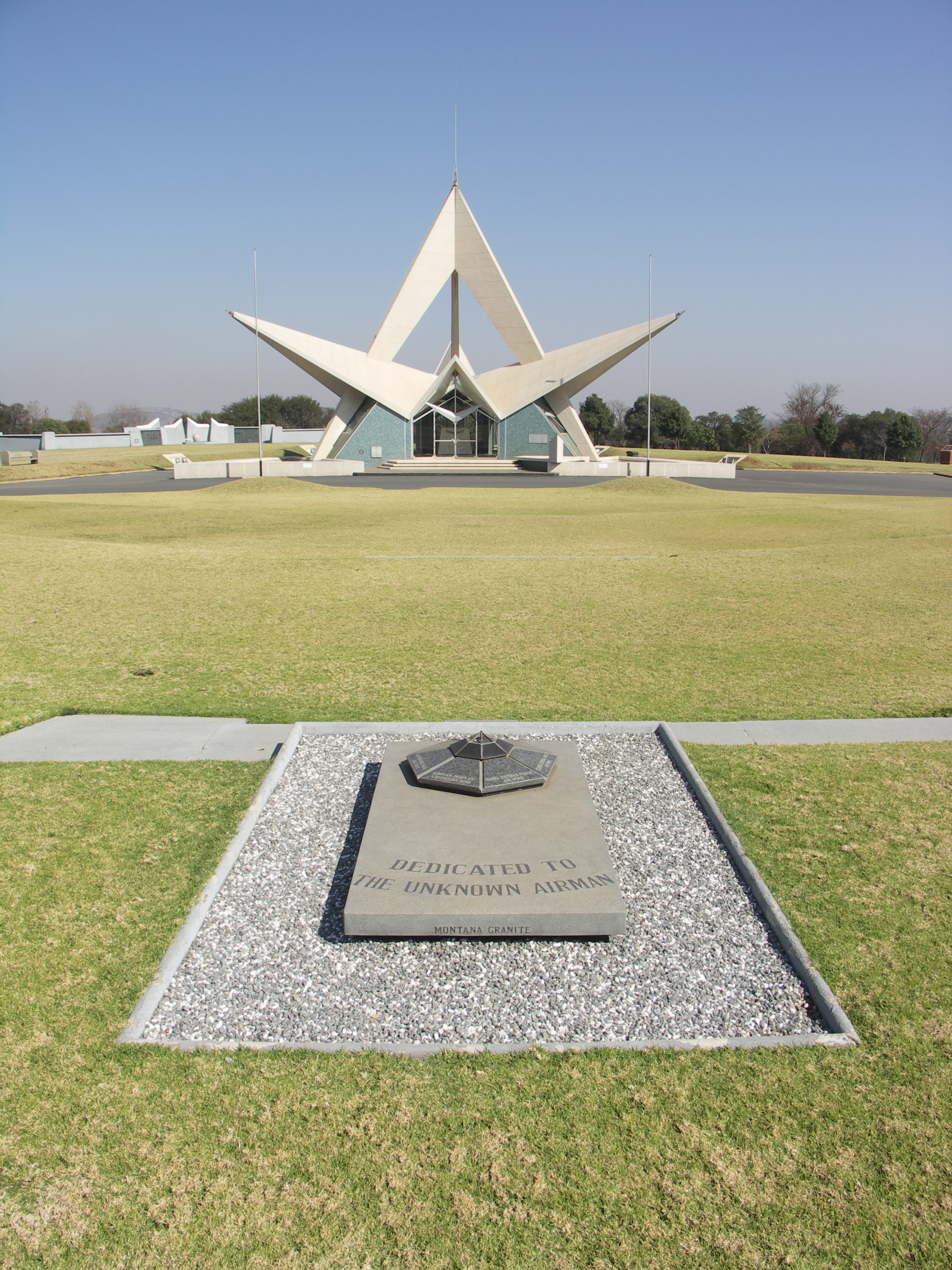
The South African Air Force Memorial

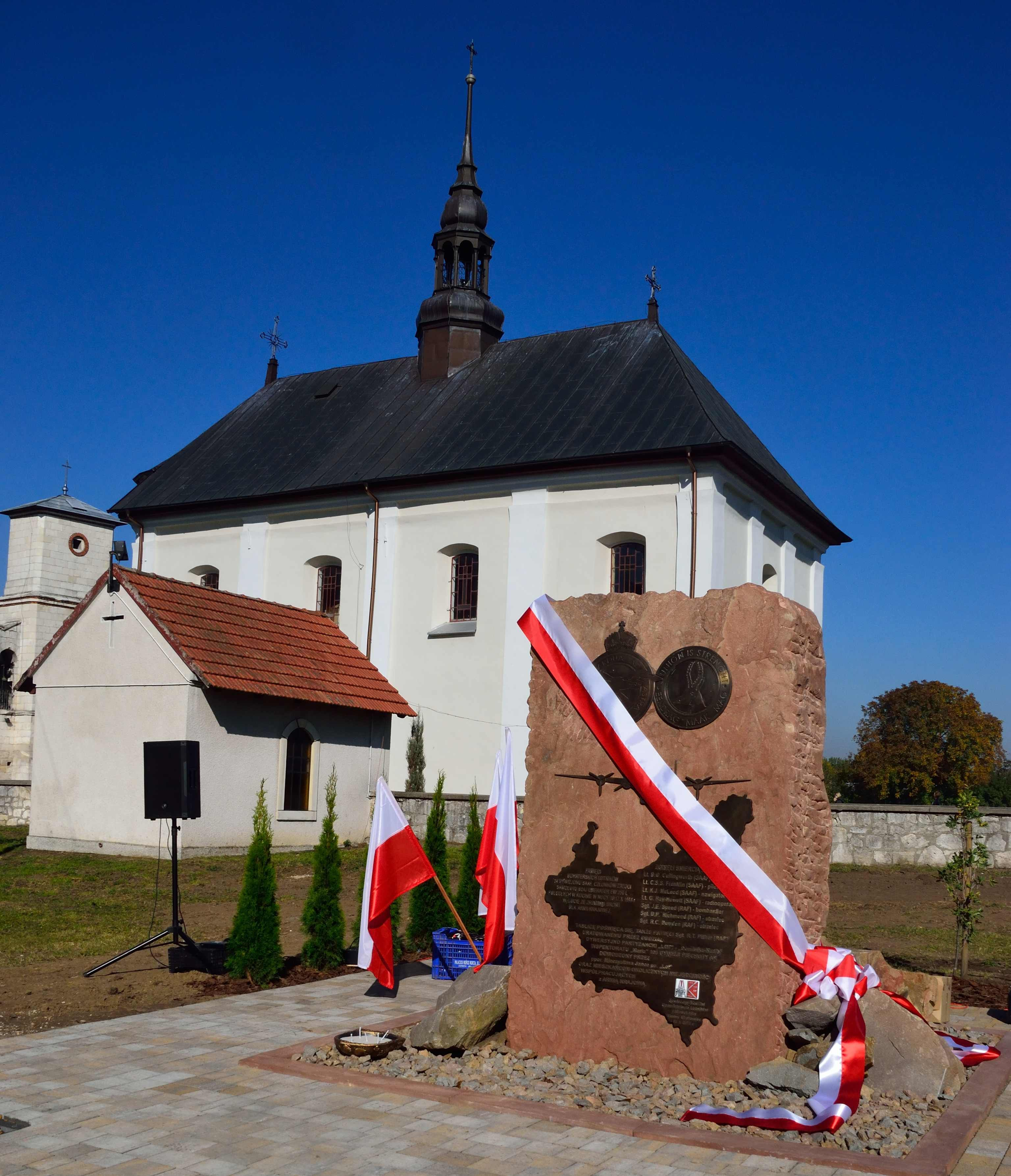
The South African Air Force Memorial in Kocina, Poland

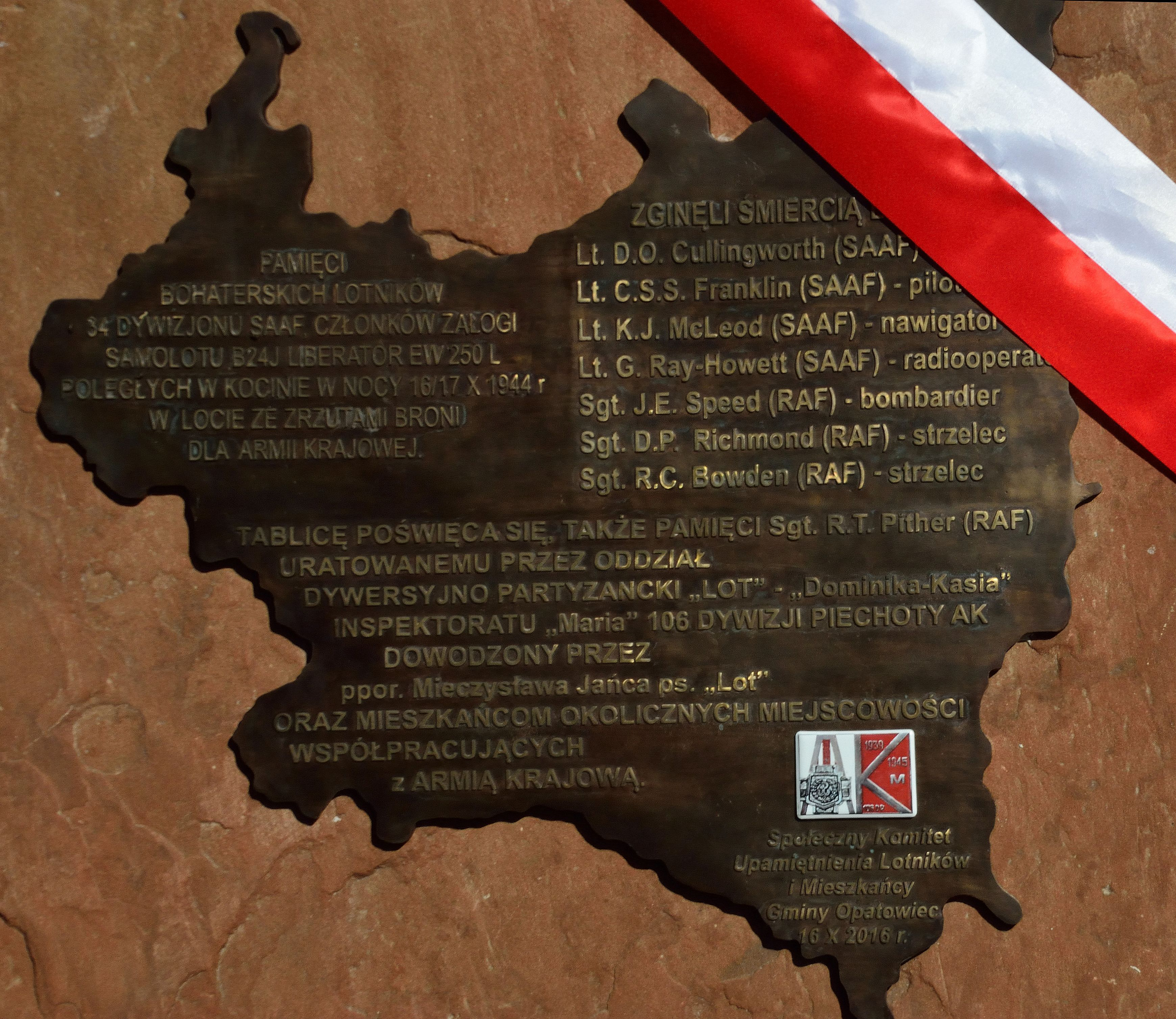
The South African Air Force Memorial in Kocina, Poland

=== Air Force Memorial ===
The South African Air Force Memorial is a memorial to South African Air Force members who have died whilst in service of the South African Air Corps and the South African Air Force from 1915 to the present. The memorial is located at Swartkop outside Pretoria.

=== Air Force Museum ===
The South African Air Force Museum houses, exhibits and restores material related to the history of the South African Air Force. It is spread across three locations; AFB Swartkop outside Pretoria, AFB Ysterplaat in Cape Town and at the Port Elizabeth airport. Swartkop is the largest of the three museum locations, occupying at least five hangars and contains a number of Atlas Cheetahs as well as a Cheetah C flight simulator.

=== Silver Falcons ===
The Silver Falcons are the aerobatic display team of the South African Air Force and are based at Air Force Base Langebaanweg near Cape Town. The Silver Falcons fly the Pilatus PC-7 Mk II Astra, the basic trainer of the SA Air Force in a 5-ship routine. The main purpose is to enhance the image of the South African Air Force, encourage recruitment and instill national pride through public display.

=== Radar coverage ===
The South African Air Force operates several radar systems within the country's borders and can deploy radar systems internationally to support external South African operations such as during UN peacekeeping operations. The Air Force's radar equipment is also supplemented by radar equipment and data from the other branches of the South African National Defence Force, the South African Weather Service and several civilian airport radars who cooperate with the Air Force to monitor air traffic.

Each air force base is equipped with air field radar approach systems (AFRAS) that monitors air traffic within the airfield's operational sector 24 hours per day. These systems include primary approach radars, precision approach radars, and secondary surveillance radar and display systems. These systems have a range of more than 120 km. The AFRAS are maintained by Saab Grintek as well as Tellumat. Air Force Base Overberg in the Western Cape is also equipped with a Doppler tracking radar and is used primarily by the Test Flight and Development Centre SAAF and the Denel Overberg Test Range for aircraft and missile development tests. In the Western Cape there is a radar station at Kapteinskop, jointly used by Air Force Base Langebaanweg and Cape Town International Airport to monitor air traffic. Air Force Base Makhado has another radar station located in the mountains to the north of the main base complex apart from its AFRAS radar (located in the main base itself).

The Air Force maintains six Umlindi (Zulu: "Watchman") AR3D long-range early warning radar systems (British AR3D radar systems extensively upgraded by the South African company, Tellumat) which are operated by 140 Squadron SAAF as part of the South African Air Force Mobile Deployment Wing. There are two static radar stations located in Lephalale (Ellisras) and Mariepskop, near Air Force Base Hoedspruit. The other systems are mobile and can be deployed to any part of the country to support operations with the use of 20-ton 8x8 MAN trucks. Each of these systems has a range of 500 km but can only track aircraft flying above 700 metres. The static radars are usually linked to two Air Force sector control centres (SCC), the Lowveld Airspace Control Sector and the Bushveld Airspace Control Sector, while the mobile radar have their own mobile sector control centres (MSCC).

To mitigate this lack of low-level radar coverage, the Air Force also operates four Plessey Tactical Mobile Radar (TMR) systems (in service with 142 Squadron SAAF). These systems can cover altitudes below 700 metres, but they have a shorter range than the Umlindi systems, at 150 km. The deployment of these systems require the use of a MAN 8×8 truck (one per system), one or two light vehicles for command and control purposes, a water tanker, a diesel bowser and a technical workshop vehicle. These systems can operate 24 hours a day with less than 20 personnel (including personnel from other AFMDW units like the Mobile Communications Unit and 501 Squadron).

The South African Air Force's Saab JAS 39 Gripen fighter aircraft are also equipped with PS-05/A pulse-doppler X-band multi-mode radar, developed by Ericsson and GEC-Marconi. This all-weather radar system is capable of locating and identifying air targets 120 km away and surface targets 70 km away. It is also able to automatically track multiple targets in the upper and lower spheres, on the ground and sea or in the air. It can guide several beyond visual range air-to-air missiles to multiple targets simultaneously (although the Air Force still lacks modern beyond visual range missile capability). When deployed operationally on combat missions and air patrols the aircraft can link their systems to the South African National Defence Force's digital network protocol, Link-ZA, to share data with other radar systems to help create a wider picture as to the situation in the air and on the ground in order to rapidly adapt to a change in short term situations.

Other branches of the South African National Defence Force also operate several radar systems that can assist the South African Air Force. The South African Navy uses four Valour-class frigates, each of which is equipped with the Thales Naval France MRR-3D NG G-band multi-role surveillance/self-defence radar that can detect low and medium-level targets at ranges of up to 140 km and in long-range 3D air surveillance mode targets up to 180 km. In the self-defence mode, it can detect and track any threat within a radius of 60 km. These Frigates can link their data systems to the Link-ZA system to help create a broader picture for the armed forces. The South African Army also operates several Reutech Radar Systems (RRS) ESR220 Thutlhwa (Kameelperd/Giraffe) Mobile Battery Fire Control Post Systems. These NATO D-Band radars have a range of 120 km and can also be linked to Link-ZA to assist air force operations.

Civilian airport radars in all nine provinces as well as the network of South African Weather Service radars can also share their radar data with the South African Air Force. According to the South African Weather Service, the South African Air Force has access to raw data from their ten long range fixed system Doppler (S-Band) and two short range mobile (X-Band) meteorological radars, and the interpreted information can be used for aviation and defence purposes.

== Training areas ==
=== Ditholo Training Area ===
Situated 66 km north of Pretoria, Ditholo Training Area used to house Air Defence Artillery Group until 1992. The 3300 hectare property is used primarily for gravel runway training, radar tracking, and aerial cargo drop exercises such as LAPES. Low Altitude Parachute Extraction System (LAPES) is a tactical military airlift delivery method where a fixed wing cargo aircraft can deposit supplies when landing is not an option in an area that is too small to accurately parachute supplies from a high altitude.

Other training include: Search and rescue exercises, basic training, VIP protection, candidate officer training, task force training and escape and evasion training.

Due to its unique ecology, Ditholo is also a registered nature reserve, being one of the few remaining portions of Kalahari plains thornveld in existence. As of 2013, Ditholo is run jointly with the Gauteng Provincial Government as part of the Dinokeng Biosphere Reserve. As of 24 May 2014 it houses more than 340 species of birds and large mammal species such as giraffe, lion, zebra, tsessebe, blue wildebeest, kudu and waterbuck.

=== The Roodewal Weapons Range ===
Situated in the Limpopo Province, roughly halfway between Polokwane (previously Pietersburg) and AFB Makhado, near the town of Louis Trichardt. This property is used for air superiority training. Buffering the range is the Corbadraai Nature Reserve.

=== Temporary Air Base Upington ===
Activated only for large scale exercises in the Northern Cape.

=== Dragons Peak Drakensberg ===
In 1985 a satellite base at Dragons Peak, in the Drakensberg was established in order to conduct helicopter mountain flying training.

=== Vastrap ===
Vastrap (Afrikaans: "stand firm") is a small military airfield situated in the Kalahari Desert north east of Upington inside a 700 square kilometre weapons test range of the same name, belonging to the South African National Defence Force. It was constructed to allow the SAAF to practice tactical bombing operations, and for aircraft to service the ARMSCOR's defunct underground nuclear weapon test site.

=== Environmental management ===
SAAF environmental services

The SAAF's training areas and bases are home to many species of fauna and flora as well as, in some instances, buildings and other structures of historical and cultural value. The Environmental Services sub-department in the SANDF Logistics Division has the overall task of ensuring proper environmental practices are in place not only on training grounds but also at bases.

The following specific management is practiced:

- Integrated Training Area Management (ITAM) aims to enhance long term, effective training by implementing management practices for land and aerial ranges to ensure their continued use and minimised environmental damage.
- Base Environmental Management (BEM) system proper management of buildings, responsible water and energy use, integrated waste management as well as ensuring cultural and historical resources are properly maintained.
- Environment for Operations (ECOps) aims to ensure adverse effects of military activities on the general environment are avoided or mitigated throughout any specific operations.

== Bibliography ==
- Green, William and Gordon Swanborough. "Annals of the Gauntlet". Air Enthusiast Quarterly, No. 2, n.d., pp. 163–176. ISSN 0143-5450
- Spring, Ivan. "Springbok Jet Age: The Gloster Meteor III in SAAF service". Air Enthusiast, No. 55, Autumn 1994, pp. 8–12. ISSN 0143-5450
