= Atlas Aircraft Corporation =

South African aircraft manufacturer (1965–1992)

- Company type: Division
- Industry: Aviation
- Founded: 1965; 61 years ago
- Defunct: 1992
- Fate: Merged into Denel Aviation
- Parent: Armscor

The Atlas Aircraft Corporation (also known as Atlas Aviation) was a South African aircraft manufacturer. It was a division of the South African government-owned defence conglomerate Armaments Corporation of South Africa (commonly known as Armscor).

It was founded during 1965 to locally produce aircraft for the South African Air Force (SAAF); the company's creation was motivated by growing international pressure on South Africa, due to the government's racially discriminatory policies known as Apartheid, which led to an international arms embargo being enacted under United Nations Security Council Resolution 418. Finding it near-impossible to import military equipment, including aircraft, Atlas locally manufactured various aircraft and associated components for the nation. It license-produced various foreign-sourced designs, such as the Impala (an Italian ground attack fighter), the Oryx (a derivative of the French Aérospatiale SA 330 Puma medium helicopter), and the Cheetah (an extensively modified model of the French Dassault Mirage III fighter).

== History ==
The Atlas Aircraft Corporation was established during 1965 for the principal purpose of locally manufacturing military aircraft, along with the associated avionics and support equipment, on behalf of the South African Air Force. Furthermore, there was also a strong desire to produce these same products for the global export market. The company's creation was significantly connected to the political climate of the nation of South Africa; since 1977, the country had been subject to an international arms embargo enacted under United Nations Security Council Resolution 418 over the racially discriminatory policies known as Apartheid. Atlas considerably benefited from the political will to circumvent or otherwise minimise the impact of this embargo by turning to domestic industry to meet its military requirements wherever possible. Atlas was reorganised during 1968 shortly after the establishment of Armaments Corporation of South Africa (commonly known as Armscor), a South African government-owned defence conglomerate, being brought under Armscor's control.

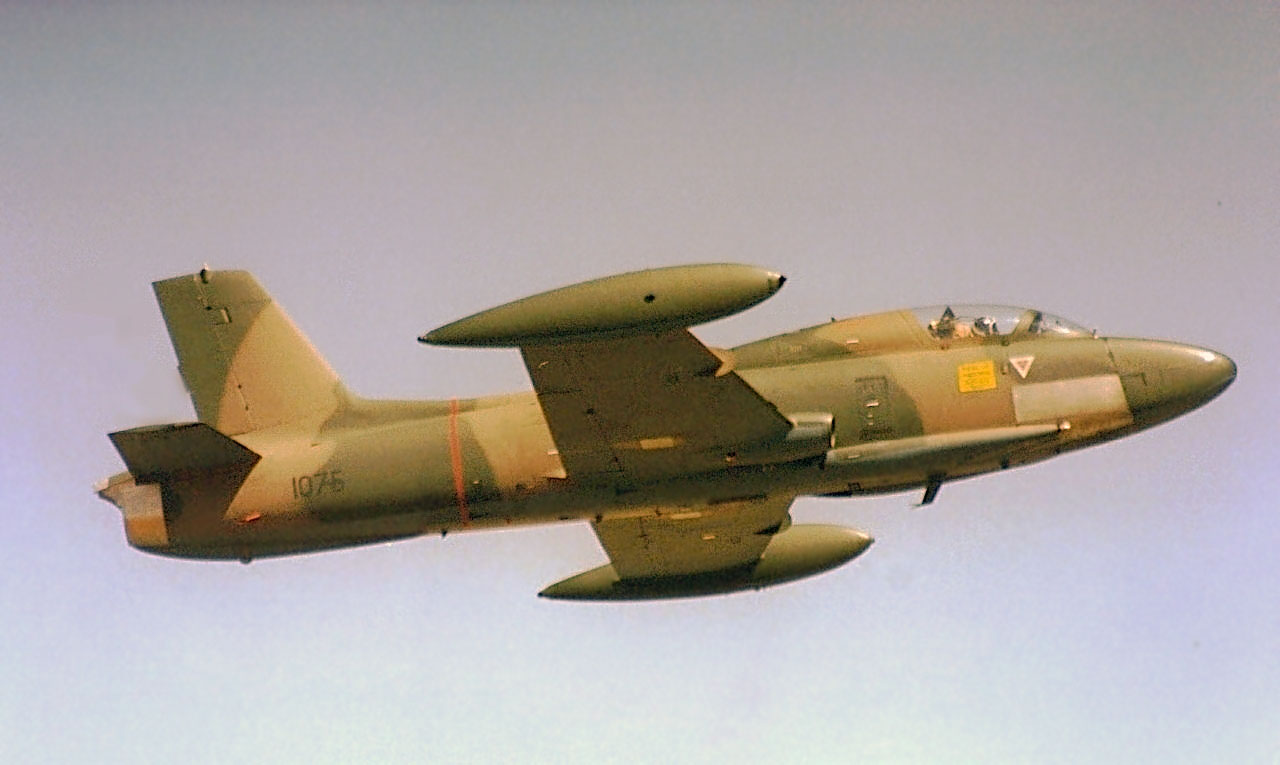
An Atlas Impala Mk. II of the South African Air Force

During 1964, South Africa had obtained a license to produce the Aermacchi MB-326, an Italian ground attack fighter; designated locally as the Impala, production of the Mk I variant commenced in 1966. Around 125 Impala Mk Is were locally produced for the South African Air Force (SAAF), substantially outnumbering the initial batch of 40 imported directly from Italy. The Impala was suitably equipped for use as both a trainer aircraft and as an armed ground attack platform. Seven examples of the MB-326K variant were also bought from Italy for the light attack role, while a further 15 were assembled by Atlas from kits. Furthermore, around 78 aircraft of this variant were locally produced, being designated by the SAAF as Impala Mk II. Production of this improved single seat version started during 1974.

The SAAF was a prolific user of the Aérospatiale SA 330 Puma, a French medium-lift helicopter. South Africa had timed most of its Puma purchases, including spare parts, to be completed in advance of another arms embargo that was enacted during 1977. The type proving popular with the service, the SAAF's Puma fleet received numerous locally developed upgrades. The most extensive of these was the Atlas Oryx, an extensively modified derivative. It was developed with assistance from Portugal, who helped supply components via secretive transactions in contravention of the embargo. While the Oryx had been largely developed to fulfil local demands; the company frequently promoted the type to potential export customers.

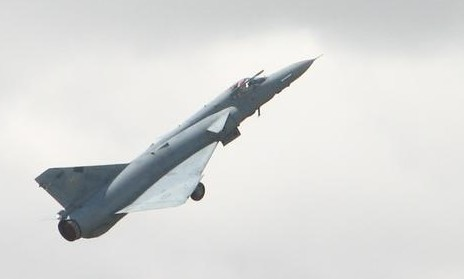
An Atlas Cheetah in flight

The 1980s was a busy decade for Atlas as South Africa engaged in a protracted conflict now known as the South African Border War. The SAAF found it needed more capable fighter and strike aircraft to attain an edge over ever-more sophisticated Soviet-built aircraft, such as the MiG-23, that were being supplied to both Angolan and Cuban forces. Furthermore, the increasing cost of maintenance due to international sanctions and the increasing age of existing aircraft in the SAAF's inventory also needed to be addressed. Due to the arms embargo, the upgrading of existing aircraft became the only realistic option available; thus the Atlas Cheetah programme was launched. Under this programme, the SAAF's fleet of French-built Dassault Mirage IIIs were extensively upgraded. Reportedly, the Cheetah could carry three times as much ordinance (in terms of weight) as the Mirage III while possessing superior agility as well, the latter partly achieved via the addition of non-moving canards just aft of the engine intakes.

South Africa also embarked on an ambitious development programme intended to produce a modern fighter aircraft to meet its long term requirement under the codename of Project Carver. It was organised as a joint effort between the SAAF, Atlas, and the National Research Laboratory. By 1986, Atlas had selected a design for a lightweight single-engined aircraft, featuring a single vertical stabiliser and a mid-mounted delta wing furnished with leading-edge root extensions (LERX) set above the engine's air intakes. It became necessary to design the aircraft around the preexisting Snecma Atar 09K50 engine; however, it became clear that, even with upgrades, if the aircraft was powered by a single Atar engine, the desired range and load-carrying capacities were unachievable. Thus, the design team changed to a twin-engine layout instead, this alteration reportedly disrupted the project for a time. During 1988, the SAAF, recognising that the project could no longer meet the original schedule, approved an interim programme, known as Project Tunny, to satisfy its immediate air defence needs via an improved version of the Cheetah, the Cheetah C.

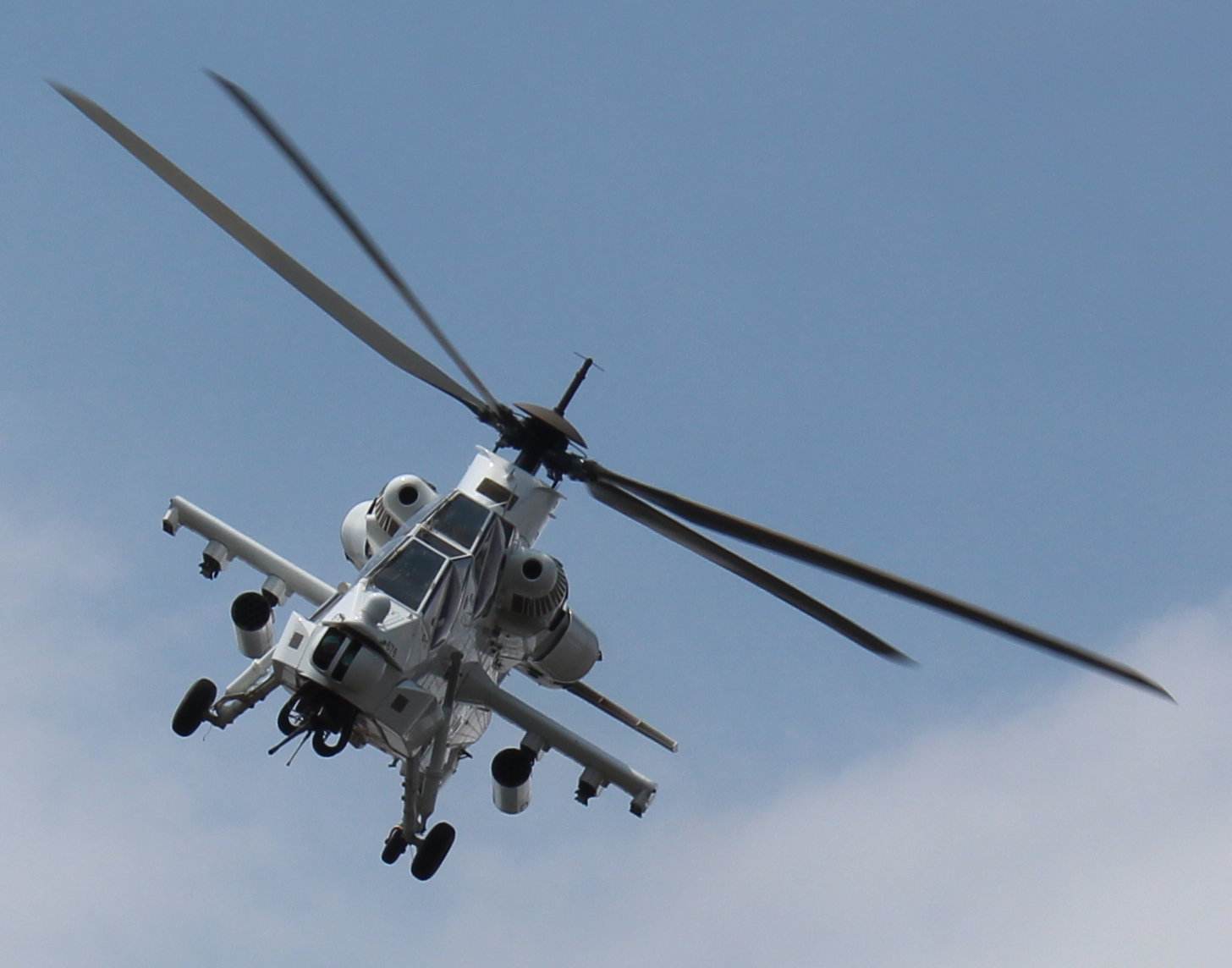
South African Rooivalk attack helicopter over FIB base in Sake 2014

Amid the Border War, the South African Defence Force recognised the need for a dedicated attack helicopter. At the service's behest, Atlas commenced development of a suitable rotorcraft during early 1984. In concept, this attack helicopter was to escort friendly helicopter troop transports, conduct strike missions upon anti-aircraft positions, and effectively counter the increasing presence of Soviet-built tanks; in the latter role, it was to be equipped with anti-tank missiles. Due to the ongoing arms embargo of South Africa, foreign combat helicopters could not realistically be imported, thus pursuing local development of such a rotorcraft became the most viable option.

Designing and manufacturing a clean-design helicopter posed significant challenges, which would have unavoidably led to very high cost and a lengthy timescale being involved in the project; thus it was decided to base the attack helicopter upon an existing design. At the time, the SAAF operated two principal helicopter types – the Aérospatiale Alouette III and the Aérospatiale SA 330 Puma. The Puma was substantially larger than the Alouette III and was equipped with more powerful engines, enabling additional equipment to be carried and greater growth prospects. The helicopter, later named the Rooivalk, was envisioned as an agile, highly sophisticated gunship, especially suited to the threats of the Angolan theatre and ably countering vehicles such as the T-55 tank. The prototype first flew on the 11 February 1990, by which time the Border War had already ended.

During 1992, Atlas was absorbed into a new entity, the state-owned aerospace and military technology conglomerate Denel; the company formed a major portion of Denel Aviation. Various programmes that were underway at Atlas at the time of its absorption have been carried on by Denel, such as the Rooivalk.

== Aircraft ==
=== Production aircraft ===
Atlas built and maintained a variety of aircraft:

- Impala Mk.I (the Aermacchi MB-326 two-seat military jet trainer aircraft designed in Italy and the Impala Mk.II, a single seat light-attack version.)
- Atlas Cheetah (a fighter aircraft built as an upgrade of the Dassault Mirage III.)
- Oryx (an upgraded version of the Aérospatiale Puma helicopter.)
- Bosbok (Italian designed light observation aircraft.)
- Kudu (South African designed light utility aircraft based on the Bosbok.)
- Rooivalk – The Rooivalk project began under the auspices of the Atlas Aircraft Corporation and went into production only after the company changed its name to Denel Aviation

Atlas also assisted the South African Air Force to maintain its fleet of planes that had been purchased (mostly) prior to the onset of sanctions in the 1970s.

=== Prototypes and unbuilt aircraft ===
- Atlas ACE
- XH-1 Alpha – based on Aérospatiale Alouette III
- XTP-1 Beta – based on Aérospatiale SA 330 Puma
- Carver

== See also ==
- Armscor (South Africa)
- List of aircraft of the South African Air Force
- Military history of South Africa
