= Denel Dynamics Seeker =

Unmanned aerial vehicle in South Africa

General information
- Type: Remote piloted aircraft, UAV/UAS
- Manufacturer: Denel Dynamics
- Status: In service South African Air Force, South African National Defence Force (Seeker 400 variant) in service with other organizations.
- Primary users: Denel Dynamics on behalf of the South African Air Force, South African National Parks, South African National Defence Force (leased by Denel Dynamics) Algerian Air Force, United Arab Emirates Air Force

History
- Introduction date: 1986 (South African Air Force)

The Denel Dynamics Seeker is an unmanned aerial vehicle (UAV) manufactured in South Africa by Denel Dynamics (formerly Kentron). The system is designed to perform tactical reconnaissance in real time and can conduct day and night surveillance in all threat environments.

== History ==
The insignia of 10 Squadron SAAF depicting the UAV, which it used in the waning days of the South African Border War

The Seeker UAV first saw active service with the South African Air Force (SAAF) and equipped 10 Squadron SAAF which was based at Air Force Base Potchefstroom. It first saw use during Operations Modular, Hooper and Packer in Angola during 1987/1988 and was used in order to provide reconnaissance and artillery weapons delivery guidance for the South African Defence Force during the Battle of Cuito Cuanavale, the last battle of the South African Border War. The UAVs also conducted several surveillance operations to gather intelligence on enemy locations, movements, their force strength and most importantly intelligence on the location of static and mobile surface-to-air missile systems. This information was then dissected by the SAAF intelligence community to plan air strikes, interception routes as well as mission briefings to keep friendly aircraft out of harm's way.

Hostile Angolan (FAPLA) forces as well as their Cuban allies were forced to fire their expensive 9K33 Osa (SA-8 Gecko) surface-to-air missiles (SAMs) in an attempt to down these small drones. This also indirectly resulted in depleting the enemy's SAM supplies which led to less risky operations by other combat aircraft in the SAAF. During one reported occasion about 17 SA-8 SAMs were fired at a single UAV, eventually downing it. During the span of the deployment only three UAVs were lost.

The short-lived squadron ceased UAV operations in November 1990 after the cessation of hostilities and was disbanded on 31 March 1991, and the Seeker UAV was withdrawn from SAAF service. The Seeker system was operated by Kentron (renamed in 1991 to Denel Dynamics) thereafter for operational control and deployment on behalf of the South African Defence Force and its successor the South African National Defence Force (after 1994). Two models were utilized, the Seeker-P model that was used for training purposes and the Seeker-D which was deployed operationally.

Over the next five years the UAV remained in service via Denel Dynamics and supported the South African National Defence Force during internal security operations in South Africa such as to monitor the country's first fully democratic elections in 1994. It was also mainly flown in support of the South African Police Service (SAPS) as well as the Department of Environmental Affairs and Tourism (in particular the Marine and Coastal Management branch). These deployments would usually last about two weeks in the operational vicinities of crime "hotspots" to assist the SAPS (usually in the Gauteng area). The system also patrolled areas in the Western Cape usually in support of the SAPS and the Marine and Coastal Management branch.

== Variants ==
=== Seeker 1 ===
This variant was the variant used during the South African Border War. It usually carried one of two mission payloads:

- The Super Colour Payload that consisted of a 2-axis gimbal platform on which two sensors were mounted, namely: Colour TV camera with a 20x zoom lens and switchable 2x converter; and a secondary sensor consisting of a TV (monochrome) camera fitted with a wide-angle lens. This variant, when observing a standard 2.3m x 2.3m target, was able to detect it at 15.90 km, recognize it at 7.10 km and identify it at 5.20 km. When observing a standard 6.0 x 6.0 m target, the sensor allows for detection at 37.40 km, recognition at 17.90 km and identification at 13.20 km.
- Multi-Sensor Payload that consisted of a stabilized 2-axis gimbal platform on which two sensors were mounted: a primary Thermal Imaging Sensor which consisted of two-Field-Of-Views and operated in the 3-5μ spectral band and a secondary sensor that consisted of a colour TV camera fitted with a 18x zoom lens.

=== Seeker 2 ===
The current baseline standard of the Seeker system in operation with Denel Dynamics and offered for export. It uses an open-architecture Ground Control Station (GCS) and employs colour displays, computerised workstations and electronic maps. A smaller Tactical Ground Control station is a new addition to the system and can be utilised to perform the same function as the GCS and it can interface with radio and satellite networks.

The UAV can operate 250 km from the control station at altitudes of up to 20,000 feet (6,100 m) and employs an array of various day and night time sensors and electronic surveillance payloads. The UAV also features digital avionics and several autonomous flight modes.

In recent years this system has undergone further upgrades and is designated as the Seeker 2+. Communication links are now standard and of a modular design. One mission control unit can now operate four to six UAVs simultaneously. These models feature an all-composite, low-drag airframe in order to ensure optimal performance in the operational area. The UAV can operate for up to 10 hours up to a service ceiling of 18,000 feet (5,500 m) with a full payload of 40 kg of equipment. On-board directional antennas also provide high jamming resistance and allow real time communication. A Tracking and Communications Unit (TCU) can now be utilised to enable optimum line-of-sight communication with the UAV. Sensor packages include:

- The Goshawk II LD multi-sensor payload combining EO/IR (day and night sensors) with an integrated laser designator and laser range-finder that can target objects up to 20 km. It also contains a single CCD with x20 zoom, a 3rd generation 3 – 5 mm infrared (IR) camera with a continuous zoom lens, automatic video tracker, azimuth and elevation gimbal with <20 mrad stabilization. Four new auto trackers are also available (histogram, edge, correlation and scene-based).
- An Electronic Surveillance Payload (ESP) is available for emitter location, with a high probability of interception of radars (0.5 to 18 GHz angle of arrival measurement, 120 degrees sector to port on-board emitter library). This provides the system with an Enemy Electronic Order of Battle (EEOB) through emitter identification.

=== Seeker 400 ===
The newest Seeker variant under development at Denel Dynamics offers enhanced situational awareness capabilities and other improvements over the Seeker 2. It can provide real-time day and night reconnaissance; target location, surveillance and designation; artillery fire support; Electronic Intelligence (ELINT) and Electronic Support Measures (ESM) and conduct border and maritime patrol missions. New additions include the capability of carrying weapons such as the laser guided missile with a missile stand-off range of 10 km. It can also operate up to 16 hours with a maximum of 100 kg of multi-mission payloads. It also features dual uplinks and downlinks, brake-assisted ground operation, piloted and autonomous flight capability, VHF and UHF FM tactical radios and Mode S Transponder and VHF AM Air Traffic Control (ATC) radio for ATC interfacing. The mission control units remain relatively the same as the Seeker 2s with modular hardware and software.

The system includes the capability of carrying dual imaging payloads with the images being transmitted to the ground control station via the dual video downlinks. Electro-optical sensor payloads with diameters of up to 530 mm can be integrated for use. This typically includes the following sensor combinations on a gimbal:

- A colour daylight camera with zoom lens
- Infrared thermal imager with different fields of view
- A day colour or monochrome spotter camera
- Night spotter camera
- Laser rangefinder
- Laser designator
- An Electronic Surveillance Payload (ESP) for electronic signals intelligence (ELINT)/ESM missions is available for detection and location of radar emitters.

== Current use ==
During the 2010 African Aerospace and Defence Exhibition the manufacturer unveiled a new light air to ground missile, the Denel Dynamics Impi that is being developed to arm the Seeker 400, the current production version. A mockup of the missile was displayed fitted to an example of the UAV.

Since December 2012, Denel Dynamics has a Seeker II UAV deployed against rhinoceros poachers in Kruger National Park. The UAV operates at night-time with its thermal and other specialist equipment supplying real-time imagery to assist patrols on the ground (daytime surveillance is conducted with SANParks fixed and rotary-winged aircraft supported by SA Air Force helicopters and an Aérospatiale Gazelle owned by the Paramount Group).

== Users ==
- (South Africa) South African Air Force and South African National Defence Force - Seeker 400 Variant
- Denel Dynamics - 1 Seeker II used to assist South African National Parks to combat rhinoceros poaching.
- (Algeria) Algerian Air Force - 10 Seeker IIs delivered between 1998 and 1999 in a $20 million deal.
- United Arab Emirates Air Force - 11 Seeker IIs in total delivered in 1996, 2003 and 2010.
- Unknown country - 5 delivered in 1995
- Saudi Arabia - unknown number-to be assembled in Saudi Arabia

== See also ==
- Denel Dynamics Bateleur, another UAV from Denel Dynamics.
