= Atlas XTP-1 Beta =

Modified aircraft

The Atlas XTP-1 Beta was an Aerospatiale SA.330 Puma converted by Atlas Aircraft Corporation as testbed for testing and evaluation of the Rooivalk's dynamic systems. Two of these Puma modifications were built, both having stub wings that carried two underwing pylons and one wingtip store. One XTP-1 Beta was seen on display with two rocket/gun pods on the pylons of each wing, underbelly 20mm GA-1 turret, and a data probe on the nose at the starboard side.

== See also ==
Related development

- Aérospatiale SA 330 Puma
- Atlas XH-1 Alpha
- Denel Rooivalk
