= 10 Squadron SAAF =

Squadron of the South African Air Force until 1943

10 Squadron
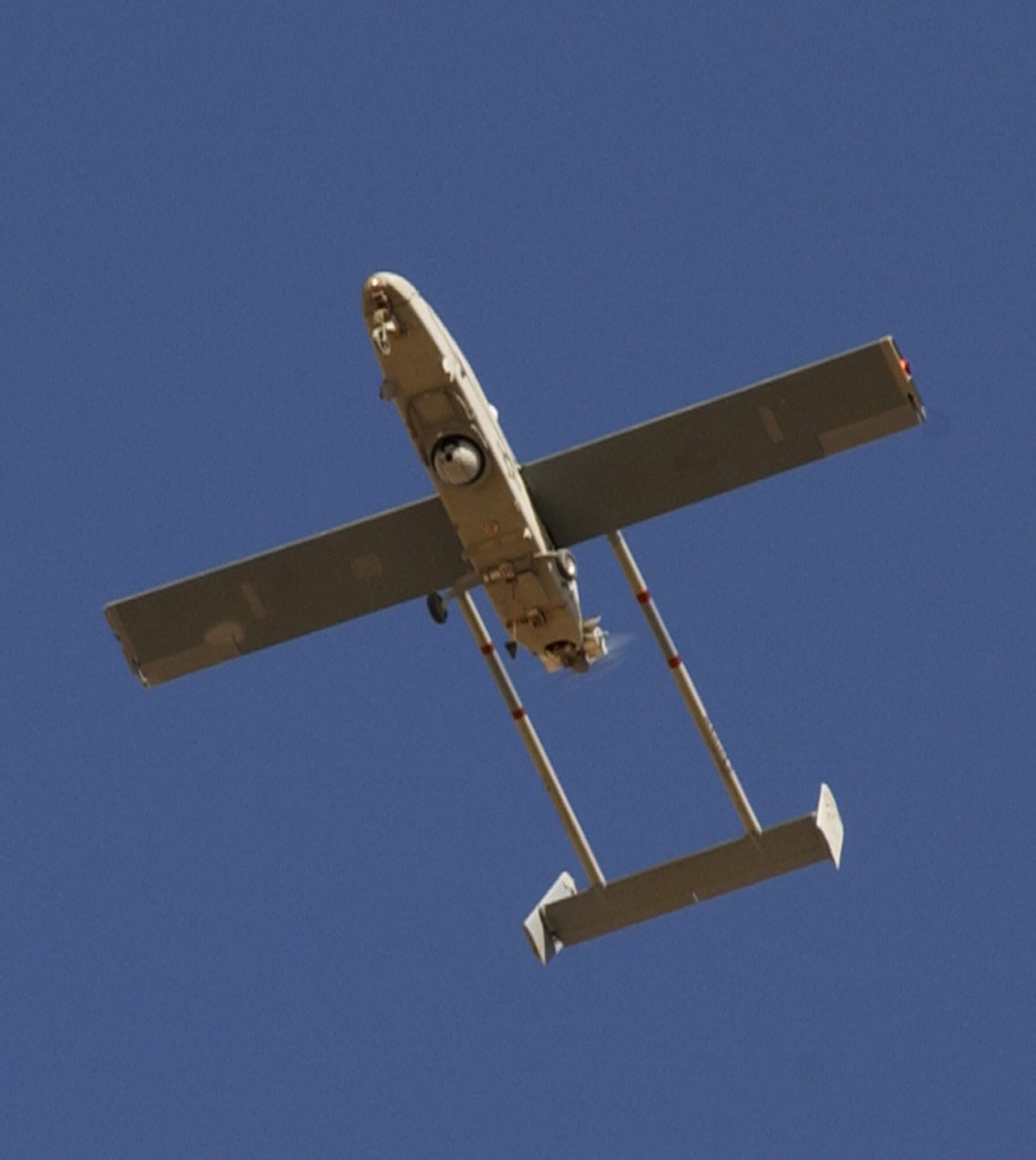
- RPV similar to the Seeker Class UAV's flown by 10 Squadron
- Active: 1 April 1939-July 1943; May 1944-October 1944; January 1986-March 1991
- Country: (South Africa)
- Branch: South African Air Force
- Role: RPV Reconnaissance
- Motto: Vigilanus (We are vigilant)
- Engagements: Battle of Cuito Cuanavale

Insignia
- 10 Squadron Crest

10 Squadron was a squadron of the South African Air Force. It was formed as a fighter bomber unit on 1 April 1939 and was deployed in a coastal defence role as part of Coastal Command SAAF until 1943. It was disbanded after the threat of Japanese naval actions off the South African coast had waned. It was re-activated as a fighter squadron on 25 May 1944 and deployed to the Middle East where the squadron saw service in Syria, Libya and the Aegean and was disbanded at the end of the war in Italy.

The squadron was reinstated as an unmanned aerial vehicle (UAV) squadron in January 1986 in Potchefstroom to provide artillery reconnaissance and fire control for the South African Artillery Corps. The unit was operationally deployed to Angola between 1987 and 1991 and was disbanded for the last time on 31 March 1991 when the UAV's were transferred to Kentron for operational control and deployment.

== History ==
=== World War II ===
10 Squadron was established on 1 April 1939 as 10 Bomber Fighter Squadron at East London. It was assigned as an Active Citizen Force squadron and was placed under command of Eastern Province Command. It was re-designated as 10 (Fighter-Bomber) Squadron (10 (F.B.) Squadron) on 1 September 1939 and renamed once again as 16 (Bomber) Squadron on 1 December 1939 under command of Witwatersrand Command while the designation of 10 (F.B.) Squadron was kept in reserve to allow for possible expansion in this type of Squadron.

The squadron role was changed back to that of a fighter squadron in February 1942 and it was designated for home defence purposes in Natal with Hawker Furies under command of Coastal Command SAAF. Fearing the possible presence of a Japanese carrier force attempting to disrupt shipping in South African waters, 6 and 10 Fighter Squadrons were re-equipped with Mohawks and later Kittyhawks and organised on a mobile basis, based at Reunion Air Field close to Durban. This structure allowed the squadron to be rapidly deployed forward to airfields along the coast to allow fighter operations in the threat area. By July 1943 the Japanese threat had receded and the squadron was disbanded.

The squadron was re-established on 25 May 1944 and was deployed to Almaza in Syria, initially for training and later as a fighter squadron equipped with Spitfire Mk. Vs. By the end of June 1944 the squadron was moved to RAF Idku in the Nile Delta, where they took over convoy escort and patrol duties from 336 (Hellenic) Squadron under command of 219 Group (RAF). The squadron aircraft were upgraded to Spitfire Mk. IXs in August 1944 and was tasked with high altitude interceptions of reconnaissance and bomber aircraft. In September the squadron was moved to Luigi di Savoia, Libya for operations over Crete and the Aegean as well as anti-submarine patrols in the Eastern Mediterranean. It was disbanded on 31 October 1944 and its aircraft were transferred to 9 Squadron. (Note: Other sources state the date of disbandment as 10 November 1944.)

=== Reformation in the 1980s ===
The squadron was re-activated in January 1986 at AFB Potchefstroom and equipped with the Kentron Seeker UAV in the role of reconnaissance and artillery weapons delivery guidance support. The squadron first deployed these aircraft operationally during Operation Modular in Angola in 1987.

It was finally disbanded on 31 March 1991 after the Seeker system was transferred to Kentron for operations on behalf of the SADF. The squadron flew two models: the Seeker-P model for training and the Seeker-D for operational deployment.

== Aircraft operated ==
Aircraft flown by 10 Squadron
Note: Aircraft type photographs may not necessarily represent aircraft of the same mark or actual aircraft belonging to the squadron.
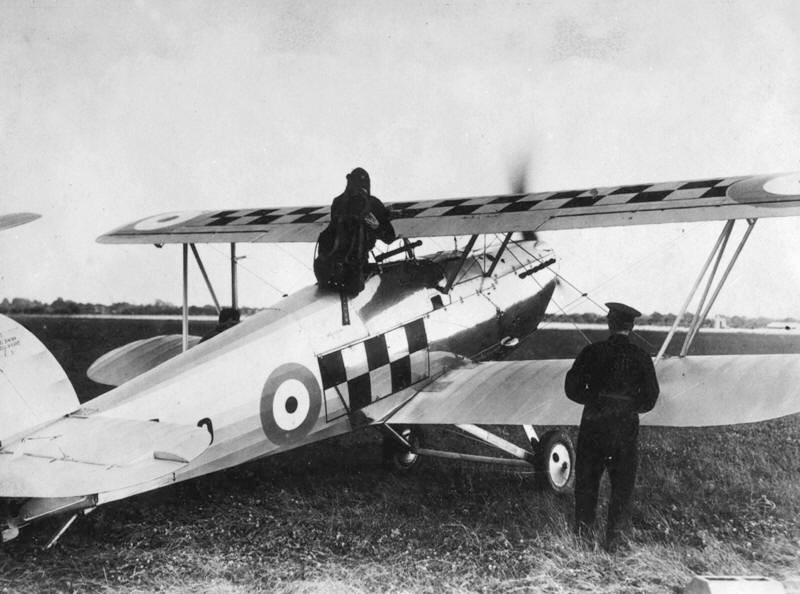
Hawker Fury
1939-1942

Curtiss Hawk Model 75
1942

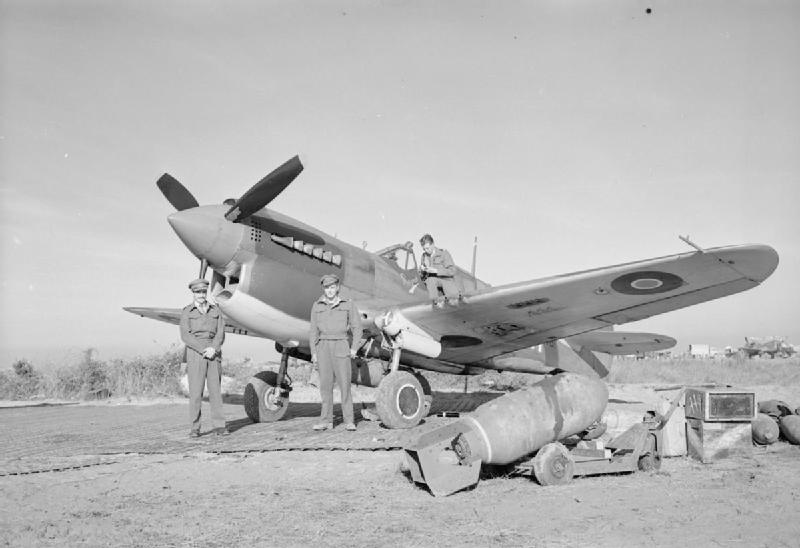
Curtiss P-40 Kittyhawk
1943

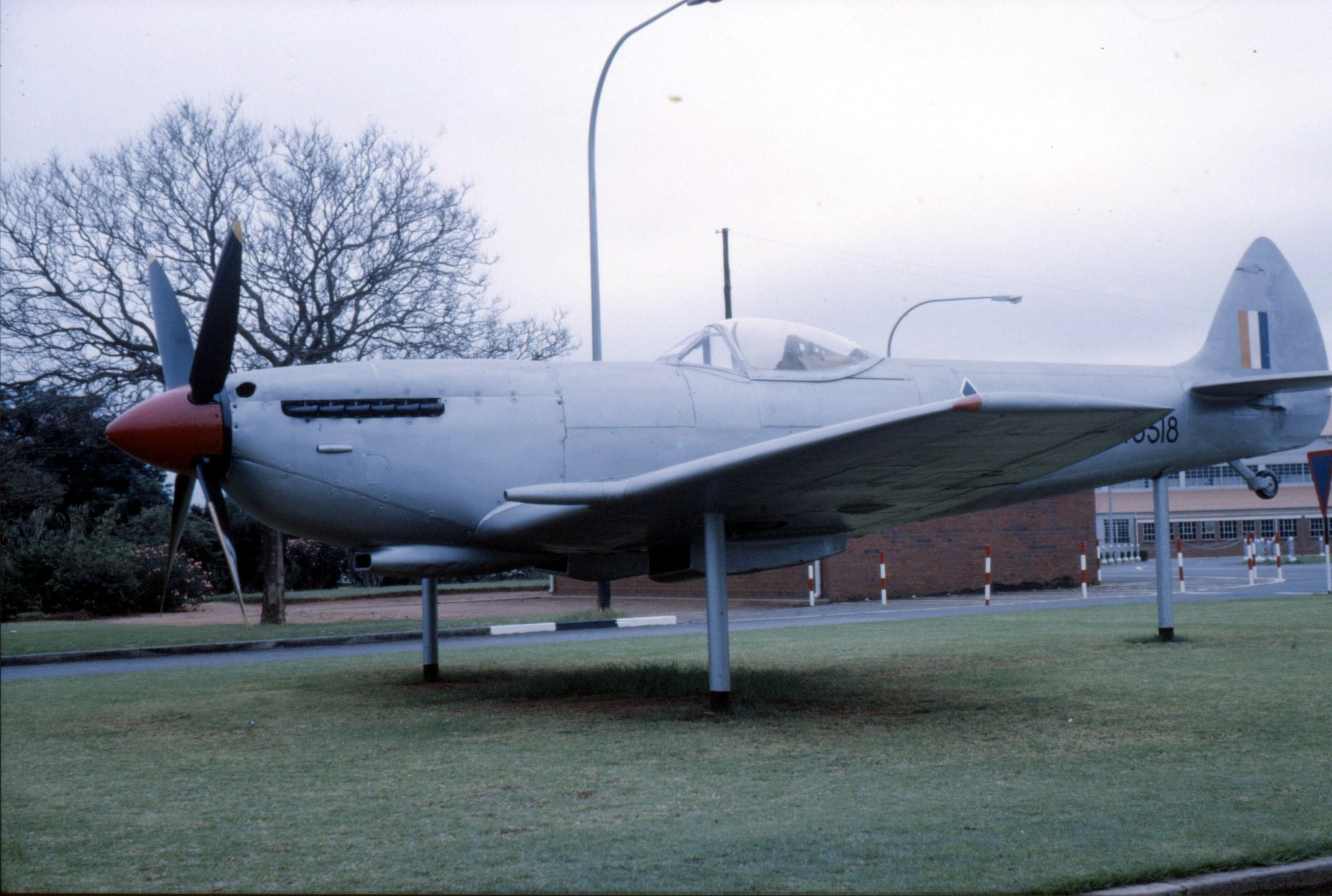
Supermarine Spitfire Mk. V
1944

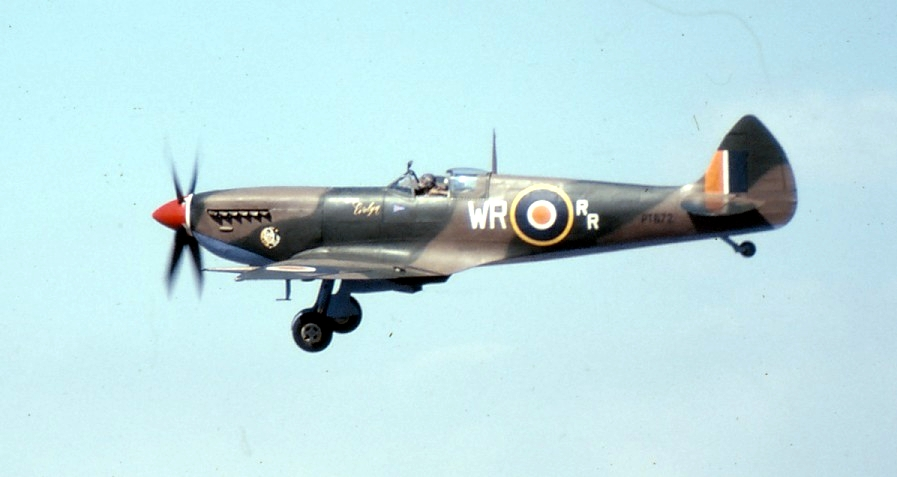
Supermarine Spitfire Mk IX
1944

== See also ==
- Denel Dynamics Seeker

== Notes and references ==
Footnotes

Citations

External Links

- Manufacturer's official brochure (Seeker 400)

References

- Martin, H.J. (Lt-Gen); Orpen, N.D. (1979). South Africa at War: Military and Industrial Organisation and Operations in connection with the conduct of War: 1939-1945 (South African Forces World War II: Volume VII). Cape Town: Purnell. p. 282. ISBN 0-86843-025-0.
