= Atlas Oryx =

Utility helicopter in the South African Air Force

Oryx
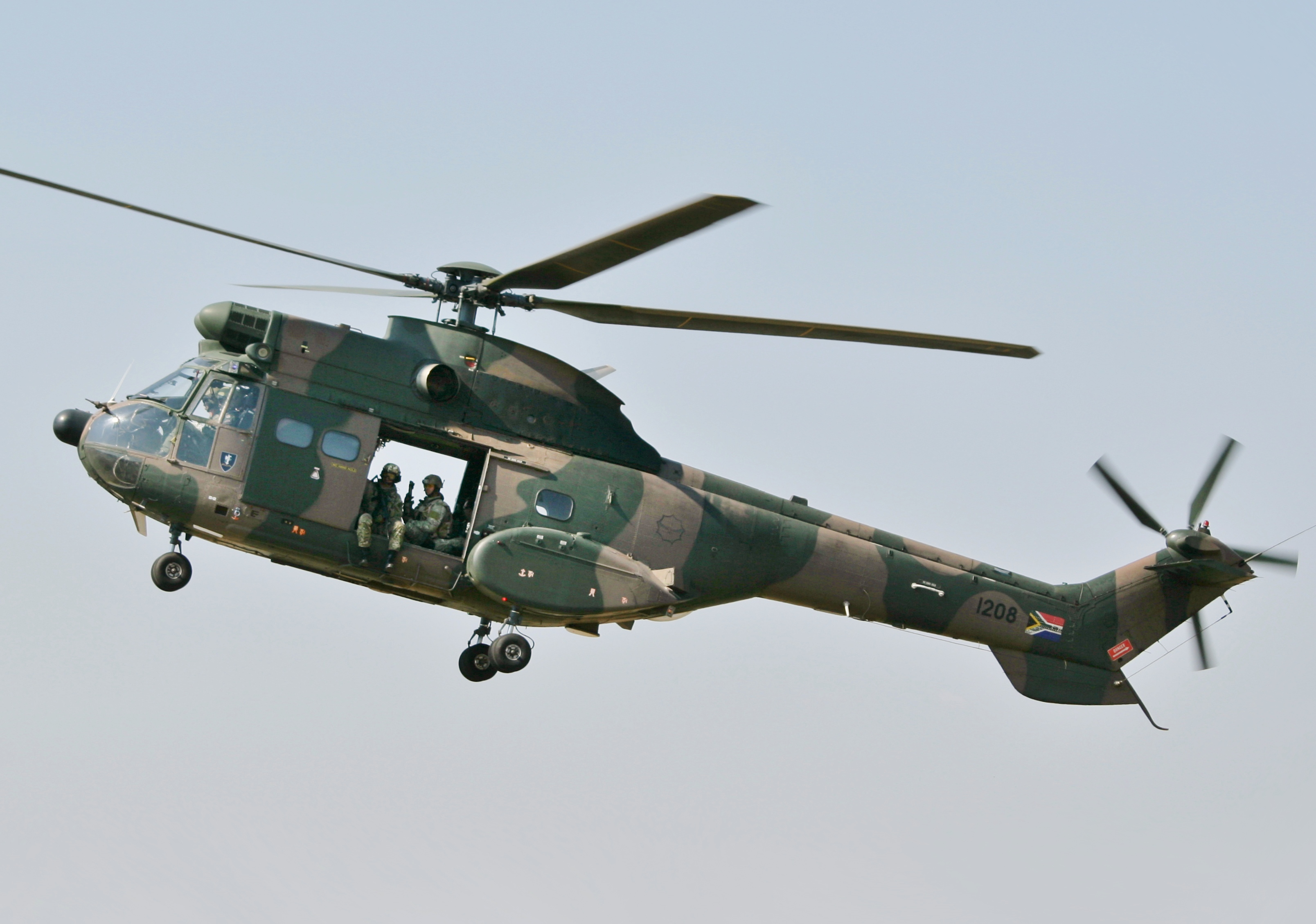
- A SAAF Atlas Oryx helicopter in flight.

General information
- Type: Utility helicopter
- National origin: South Africa
- Manufacturer: Atlas Aircraft Corporation
- Status: In service
- Primary user: South African Air Force
- Number built: 50

History
- Manufactured: 1986-1991
- Introduction date: 1987
- First flight: 1986
- Developed from: Aérospatiale SA 330 Puma

The Atlas Oryx (named after the Oryx antelope) is a medium-sized utility helicopter ostensibly developed and manufactured by the Atlas Aircraft Corporation (now Denel Aeronautics) of South Africa. Its largest operator is the South African Air Force (SAAF), having been originally developed to fulfil their needs.

Development of the Oryx commenced during the early 1980s, largely in response to the wartime demands of the Border War and the imposition of an arms embargo upon South Africa, which prevented the importing of foreign transport helicopters such as the Aérospatiale SA 330 Puma. Seeking to improve and augment the SAAF's existing fleet of rotorcraft, domestic industries examined means of improving the Puma helicopter. The Oryx is closely connected to the Denel Rooivalk attack helicopter, both rotorcraft being based on the Puma and development having been worked on in parallel around roughly the same time period. Following the conversion of a single Puma to the Oryx configuration, quantity production of the Oryx was authorised during the late 1980s.

Allegedly, the Oryx's development was greatly facilitated by the French helicopter firm Aérospatiale, the Puma's original manufacturer, who produced kits that were supplied to South Africa; Atlas Aviation had denied this involvement and claimed that the Oryx was an entirely indigenous programme. The existence of the Oryx became public knowledge during 1991, by which point it was in service with the SAAF. In the early 2000s, the SAAF opted to reduce the size of the Oryx fleet and upgrade the remainder; the scope of these upgrades was largely limited to airframe life extensions. The Oryx had been repeatedly deployed in the Democratic Republic of Congo (DRC) in support of UN-led peacekeeping operations in the country.

== Development ==
=== Background ===
The South African Air Force (SAAF) was a particularly prolific user of the French-sourced Aérospatiale SA 330 Puma, a medium-sized military transport helicopter. However, the nation's ability to procure further Pumas, along with many other items of military apparatus, had been greatly constrained following the enactment of an arms embargo upon South Africa under United Nations Security Council Resolution 418 due to its policy of apartheid. The inability to import new foreign military helicopters coincided with a long running military conflict between South Africa and neighbouring Angola, commonly referred to as the Border War or the Bush War. The need for capable attack helicopters beyond that of the gunship-configured Alouette series of helicopters was recognised by SAAF officials, leading to Atlas Aircraft producing an experimental attack helicopter, the XH-1 Alpha, and subsequently the more powerful XTP-1, the latter being created via the conversion of two existing Puma J airframes.

The development of an entirely new helicopter from scratch would have involved designing and developing many accompanying subsystems and components, such as the turboshaft engines and the dynamic systems, such as the main and tail rotor systems and the gearboxes. Due to the great difficulty posed by the prospects of designing and manufacturing a clean-design helicopter, which would have substantially increased the cost and timescale of the project, it was decided to base the attack helicopter upon an existing design. During this era, the SAAF operated two principal helicopter types – the Aérospatiale Alouette III and the Puma. While the Alouette III was a compact helicopter whose design originated in the 1960s, lacking in engine power and being relatively early amongst production rotorcraft and thus not a favourable candidate for further development work, the Puma was substantially larger and was equipped with more powerful engines; both factors provided a broader basis for the accommodation of additional equipment and for potential growth.

Officials became keen advocates for the improvement of the SAAF's existing rotorcraft via domestic upgrade programmes. One such initiative was the development of a dedicated attack helicopter based upon the dynamic systems of the Puma, which became the Denel Rooivalk. Atlas recognised the value of, in parallel to the Rooivalk's development, a localised and improved model of the Puma, an initiative which became the Oryx. In comparison to the Puma, the Oryx would possess an increased power-to-weight ratio and yield improved performance in the high temperature climate that the rotorcraft was typically being operated in; in comparison to the Rooivalk, development of the Oryx could proceed at a far quicker pace as it was an essentially more straightforward programme. Furthermore, the supply of spare parts for the Puma was a notable exception in the sanctions, making them plentiful in a circumstance where most counterparts would be blocked.

=== Production and alleged international involvement ===
While the foreign supply of most military equipment to South Africa was in violation of Resolution 418 at that time, deterring the majority of organisations from doing so, this did not render external assistance entirely beyond the realm of possibility. According to the author Hennie Van Vuuren, South African military planners arranged for the purchase of 66 Aérospatiale AS332 Super Pumas, an improved model of the Puma already in SAAF service; following their production in France, they would be disassembled for transit and transferred to the Portuguese Air Force, who officially were to be the end recipient, but would in fact transfer the disassembled rotorcraft onto South Africa via a Portuguese intermediary, where they would be reassembled by Atlas under the Oryx name.

During the 1990s, legal action was launched by the Portuguese firm Beverley Securities Incorporated (BSI) against the multinational helicopter manufacturer Eurocopter, the successor to Aérospatiale, over allegations related to the Oryx's development and its relation to the Puma helicopter. Allegedly, from 1986, South Africa had been supplied with 50 kits for the Oryx programme from Eurocopter via BSI under a $3 billion contract; BSI claimed that the Oryx was actually developed primarily by Aérospatiale, and that the kits had been described as spares for South Africa's existing fleet of Pumas. Atlas Aviation has consistently claimed that the Oryx was an indigenous programme that was developed by Atlas itself. During the 2010s, legal action on the matter between various parties, in which political involvement was alleged by Van Vuuren, was still ongoing.

A single Puma, no. 177, was converted to the Oryx configuration and served as a prototype; reportedly the results collected were in excess of all expectations, contributing to the launch of the Oryx programme. The presence of sanctions had encouraged both the South African government and domestic industries to pursue self-sufficiency wherever possible, and this principle was particularly apparent in the production of aircraft components and, with the knowledge to assemble pre-manufactured helicopters, led to the technical skill for producing complete Puma helicopters, should the need arise. This included complete airframes and dynamic components such as gearboxes, rotor blades and turbines and hot section parts. Wherever it was feasible to do so, commonality with the Rooivalk's systems was pursued in order to simplify logistics and reduce maintenance costs for both fleets.

== Design ==
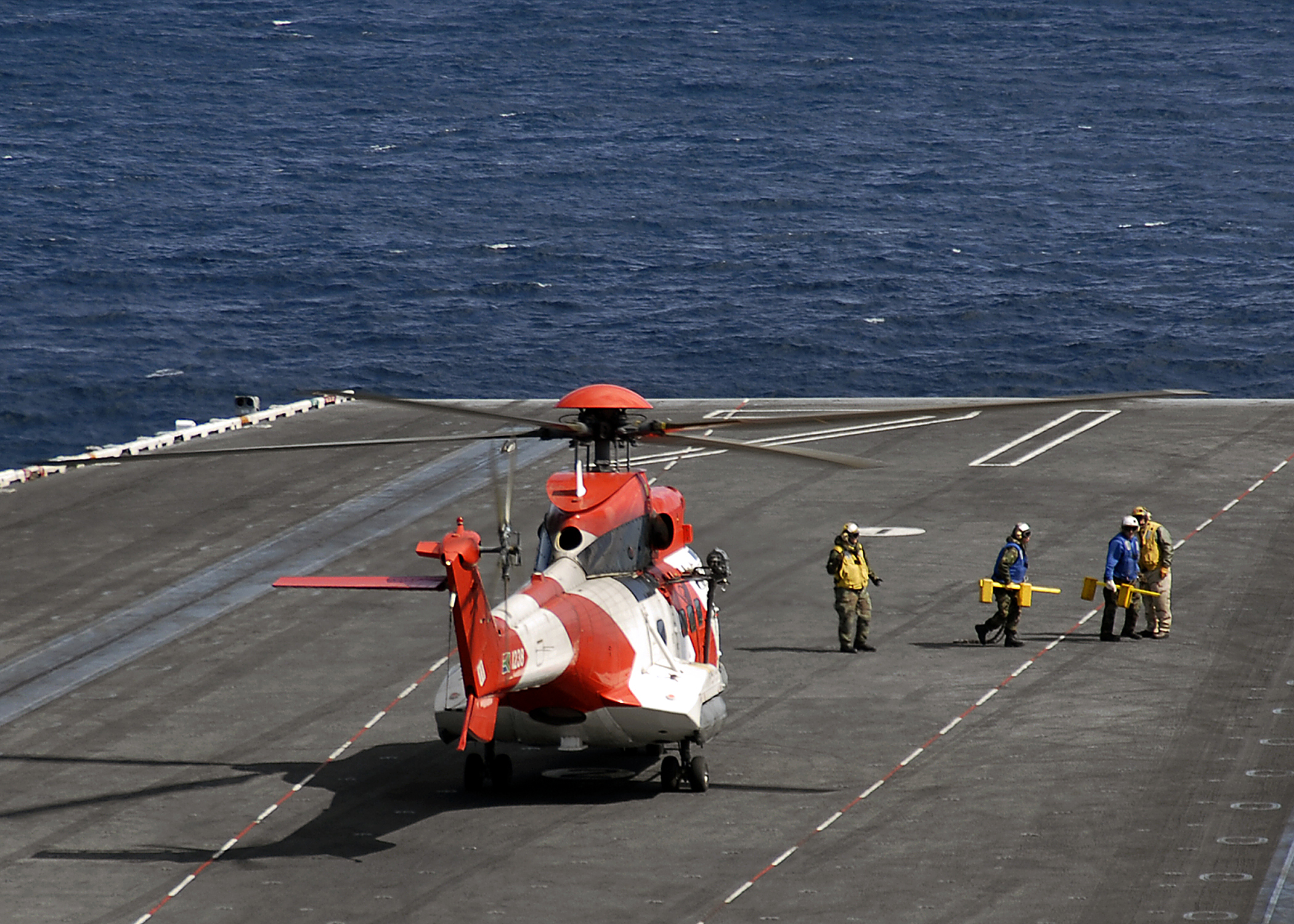
A South African Air Force Oryx M2 helicopter preparing to take off from USS Theodore Roosevelt

The Oryx is an upgraded and remanufactured version of the Puma, being basically equivalent to the Eurocopter AS332 Super Puma, and offers a performance improvement over the original model, in addition to reducing the operating costs by 25 to 30%. Early examples were fitted with the latest dust filters, as were then in use on the SAAF Puma, along with a moveable auxiliary air intake directly ahead of the engine. A newly designed dust filter was subsequently fitted, facilitating the removal of this auxiliary air intake. Should one of the engines be rendered inoperable, the remaining powerplant has sufficient power for the Oryx to complete its mission. If an engine fails in flight, the management system automatically advances the power setting on the remaining engine, ensuring the Oryx sustains flight with relatively little crew input, during such an emergency.

The basic airframe is still that of the original Puma, but the structure was modernized by extensive use of locally produced carbon-composite materials. These materials result in an airframe that is lighter and more rugged, which increases the Oryx's endurance and maneuverability. The obvious external difference is the new modified tailboom which is slightly longer (50 cm), than the Puma. Most Oryx are equipped with a 50m hydraulic hoist, rated for up to 2 personnel, for use in rescue operations. Additionally a large metal A-frame structure can be fitted in the cargo bay which allows up to four personnel to rappel or abseil from the aircraft simultaneously. Oryx operating from coastal squadrons are fitted with emergency flotation gear on the sponsons and nose.

Throughout the 1990s, Atlas representatives routinely marketed the Oryx to potential export customers, focusing particularly upon existing operators of the Puma within the African sub-continent; this sales effort included the provision of an upgrade package for existing Pumas into an Oryx-equivalent configuration.

== Operational service ==
During mid-1991, the SAAF publicly acknowledged that the Oryx was in service and that its purpose was to replace its aging fleets of Pumas and Aérospatiale Super Frelons alike. It was displayed for the first time at an open day at Potchefstroom in August 1991.

Since 2003, the South African Air Force has dispatched multiple Oryx into the Democratic Republic of Congo (DRC) in support of UN-led peacekeeping operations in the country. In 2003, a pair of Oryx were stationed in the Ituri/Bunia area as part of a bilateral agreement with France, being briefly used to facilitate troop movements and medium-grade transport duties. A two-year long deployment started in 2007, with two Oryx deployed at a forward operating base in Kamina for transportation purposes in the unstable Goma region; the element was subsequently relocated to a site within Goma itself and strengthened with three additional Oryx and three Rooivalk attack helicopters. By 2015, the South African Aviation Unit in the DRC involved around 140 personnel and five Oryx, amongst other assets.

Being a multirole helicopter, the Oryx's primary missions within the SAAF have included medium to heavy transport duties, communications flights, task force rapid deployment operations, fire fighting, and search & rescue missions. Each one can reportedly carry up to 20 fully equipped troops, or up to six wounded personnel on stretchers with four attendants; in terms of freight, it can carry a maximum payload of 3,000 kg within the cabin, or transport up to 4,500 kg freight on an external sling. Tasks performed for the South African Navy include general transportation, at-sea replenishment, force multiplication, reconnaissance, and search & rescue operations.

During 2003, it was announced that, as a part of a major modernisation and reequipment programme, the SAAF had declared ten of its Oryx helicopters to be surplus to requirements and would be made available for re-sale. At the time, the service was in the process of inducting several new types, including the Saab JAS 39 Gripen multirole fighter, the BAE Systems Hawk trainer/ground attack aircraft, and the AgustaWestland AW109 rotorcraft, the latter being the SAAF's modern rotary-wing component.

In 2006, the SAAF initiated a mid life upgrade for its remaining inventory of 35 Oryx; one stated aim of this work was to extend the type's service life through to the 2015 - 2020 timeframe. In large part due to ongoing budgetary restrictions, the mid-life upgrade was limited in scope to life extensions to the air frame, although limited updates were performed to both the communications and navigation suites as well. Early ambitions had reportedly involved a more comprehensive modernisation of the Oryx, which included the integration of a glass cockpit.

Oryx have been routinely deployed to perform humanitarian relief operations, such as after floods and other natural disasters.

== Variants ==
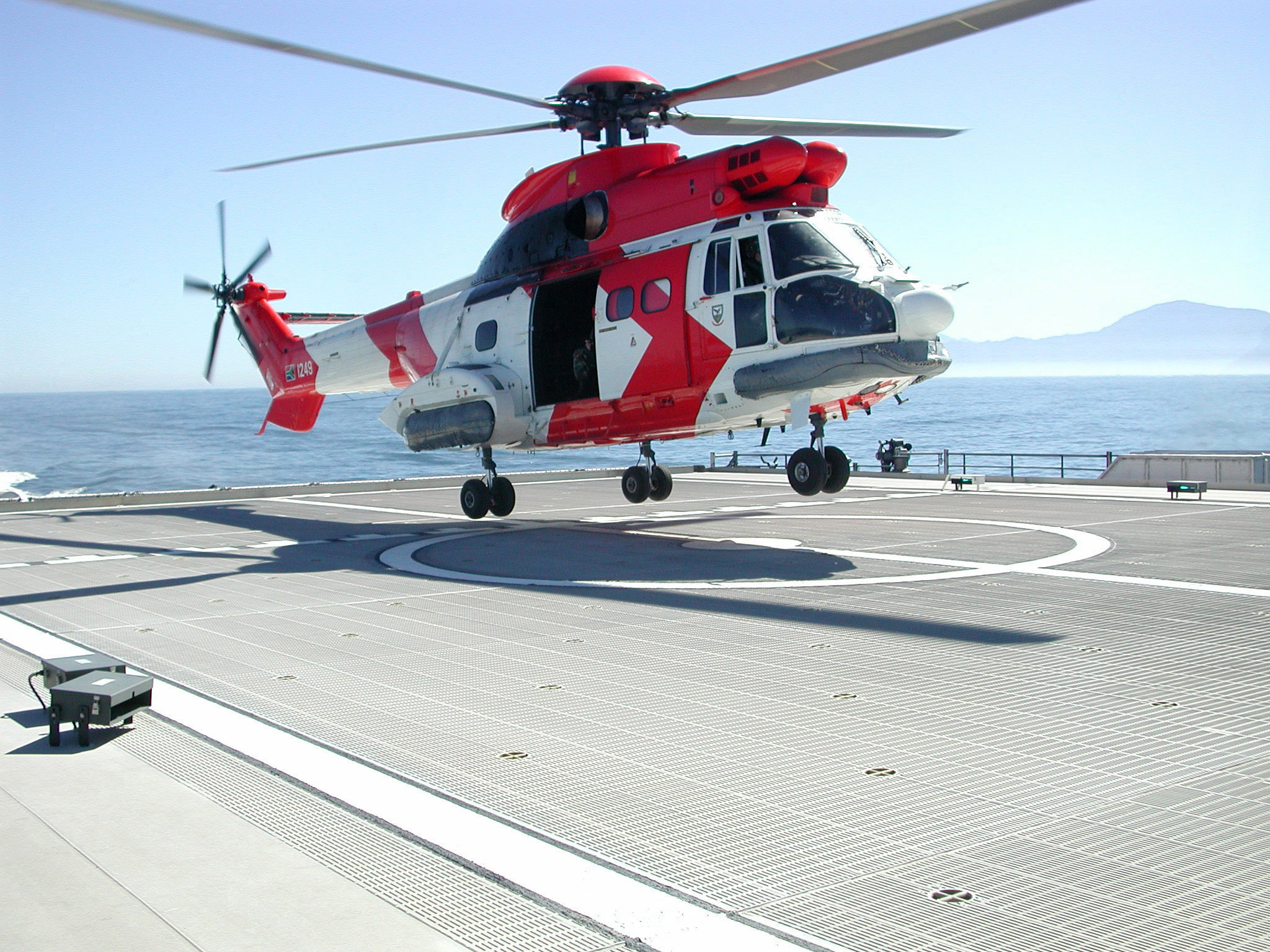
Mark 2 (maritime) variant of the Oryx

In its basic platform the design of the Oryx offers a number of advantages and this was further developed from an early stage in the program. With the Denel Rooivalk now in service, this combat helicopter will escort the Oryx in a high threat environment. However, as an interim measure an Oryx with door mounted machine guns did appear. Oryx helicopters are constantly refined and updated. A full glass cockpit is planned for a future update. The latest addition is the fitting of flare dispensers and the update of the Threat Warning Receivers.

There is an electronic warfare (stand-off communications jamming/radar jamming) version of the Oryx that is equipped with the Grinaker Systems Technologies (GST) GSY 1501 jamming system, among others. The first Oryx variant with a large log periodic antenna on the starboard side was regarded as quite an effective EW platform. This platform is capable of disrupting key communications during various stages of modern, air-, land-, and sea battles. In addition it is used as an effective training aid to the SANDF, to test their function as an effective fighting force, despite any EW methods employed against the SA Forces. A further advantage is, EW equipment in use by the SA Forces can be effectively evaluated and calibrated under simulated battlefield scenarios. One variant has its main cabin doors replaced by dome shaped antennas.

The Oryx Mk. 2 contains such a number of differences, that a different model number is used, to distinguish the type. Although, operated and flown by 22 Squadron SAAF, these helicopters were specifically built for use by the Department of Environmental Affairs and Tourism, as part of the South African National Antarctic Programme. Two Oryx helicopters have been modified for operations in the Southern Ocean and the Antarctic, for which they have been painted in the red and white colour scheme. Highly effective, de-icing equipment, of up rated specification, was the central requirement of the Mk. 2 program. The project received the go-ahead on 15 March 1996, with Lt Col K. Viljoen as project leader. The project was completed three weeks ahead of schedule and the two helicopters delivered to 22 Sqdn, during October 1997. One of the Mk. 2 Oryx helicopters was written off subsequent to a crash landing in July 2004.

== Operators ==
South Africa

- South African Air Force
  - 87 Helicopter Flying School
  - 15 Squadron
  - 17 Squadron
  - 19 Squadron
  - 22 Squadron

== Specifications ==
Orthographically projected diagram of the SA330 Puma Line Drawing

General characteristics

- Crew: Three
- Capacity: 20 fully equipped troops
- Length: 15.45 m (50 ft 8 in)
- Height: 5.14 m (16 ft 10 in)
- Empty weight: 3,600 kg (7,937 lb)
- Max takeoff weight: 8,000 kg (17,637 lb) or 8,400 kg (18,500 lb) with external load
- Powerplant: 2 × Turbomeca Makila IA1 turboshaft engines, 1,400 kW (1,900 hp) each
- Main rotor diameter: 15.6 m (51 ft 2 in)
- Main rotor area: 191 m^{2} (2,060 sq ft)

Performance

- Maximum speed: 306 km/h (190 mph, 165 kn)
- Combat range: 303 km (188 mi, 164 nmi)
- Ferry range: 2,000 km (1,200 mi, 1,100 nmi)
- Service ceiling: 7,162 m (23,497 ft)
- Rate of climb: 15.25 m/s (3,002 ft/min)

Armament

- Guns: 2 × door-mounted 7.62 mm machine guns (optional; either FN MAG or Denel SS-77)

== Family tree ==
  - SA330 Puma – (France)
    - Atlas Oryx – (South Africa)
      - Denel Rooivalk – (South Africa)
    - IAR 330 – (Romania)
    - IPTN NAS 330J (Indonesia)
    - Westland Puma HC.1 (United Kingdom)
  - Eurocopter AS332 Super Puma – (France) (H215 Super Puma)
    - Eurocopter AS532 Cougar – (France) (H215M Caracal)
    - KAI KUH-1 Surion – (South Korea)
  - Eurocopter EC725 – (France) (H225M Caracal)
    - Eurocopter EC225 Super Puma – (France) (EC225 Super Puma Mk2)

== See also ==
Related development

- Aerospatiale Puma
- Denel Rooivalk

Related lists

- List of attack aircraft
- List of helicopters
