= MUPSOW =

MUPSOW (Multi-Purpose Standoff Weapon)
- Type: Air-to-surface
- Place of origin: South Africa

Service history
- In service: In development
- Used by: South Africa

Production history
- Manufacturer: Kentron

Specifications
- Mass: 400 kg (882 lb)
- Length: 4.92 m (16 ft)
- Wingspan: 1.9 m (6 ft)
- Warhead: high explosive warhead; Bunker penetrator; Fragmentation
- Engine: Turbojet
- Operational range: 300 km (186 mi) possibly up to 500km.
- Maximum speed: Subsonic
- Launch platform: Fixed wing aircraft

The Denel Dynamics (formerly Kentron) MUPSOW (MUlti-Purpose, Stand-Off Weapon) is a guided weapon designed for pinpoint strikes against soft targets such as airfields, bunkers and command-and-control centers at stand-off ranges. Accuracy is achieved by using an advanced inertial navigation and terminal guidance technology consisting of a data link to either TV, IIR or MMW seekers. The airframe is made out of composites, powered by a turbojet. The weapon carries warheads of fragmentation, anti-runway ordnance and single warhead configurations.

The Mupsow is a South African development on which Kentron has been working under contract from the Air Force since 1991, with unpowered flight tests commencing in 1997. The MUPSOW is thought to be an extension of the H2 stand-off weapon program. It is not known if Mupsow has entered SAAF service.

== See also ==
- Ra'ad-II, a Pakistani ALCM which possess somewhat similarities in dimensions and appearance
