= Denel Aeronautics =

South African aviation and aerospace business

- Company type: Subsidiary
- Industry: Aerospace; Defence
- Predecessor: Atlas Aircraft Corporation
- Founded: 1964; 62 years ago as Atlas Aircraft Corporation; 1992; 34 years ago as Denel Aviation; 2017; 9 years ago as Denel Aeronautics
- Headquarters: Kempton Park, Gauteng, South Africa
- Area served: Global
- Products: Rooivalk; Cheetah; Oryx
- Parent: Denel
- Website: denelaviation.co.za

Denel Aeronautics is the aviation and aerospace division of the state-owned Denel corporation of South Africa. It is one of the successors of the South African aviation company Atlas Aircraft Corporation.

The division was created during 1992 following the acquisition and absorption of Atlas Aircraft into Denel. Initially named Denel Aviation, it was rebranded as Denel Aeronautics during 2017 following the reintegration of Denel Aerostructures.

The company manufactures the Rooivalk, a domestically-developed attack helicopter that had been developed by Atlas Aircraft; the company also provides support services for a wide range of aircraft, both of the former Atlas Aircraft's range and from numerous international manufacturers.

Denel Aeronautics is the dominant provider of aircraft maintenance and support services across various types operated by the South African Air Force; it also provides those services to other operators worldwide.

== History ==
During 1992, the South African aviation company Atlas Aircraft Corporation was absorbed into Denel, a state-owned defence conglomerate. In conjunction with this restructuring, the company's name was changed to Denel Aviation, functioning as the aviation and aerospace-orientated division of Denel thereafter.

During 2006, Denel Aviation was reorganised and its activities split between two separate divisions; for the most part, manufacturing activity was transferred to the newly created Denel Aerostructures, which Denel Aviation continued to operate, specialising in aircraft servicing and maintenance. During 2017, Denel Aviation and Denel Aerostructures were reunited by their merger to form Denel Aeronautics.

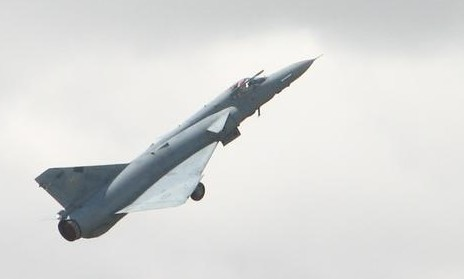
An Atlas Cheetah in flight

Denel Aeronautics' ties to the Atlas Aircraft Corporation meant that it effectively inherited various programmes that the company had been engaged in. It continued to remanufacture South African Air Force (SAAF) Dassault Mirage IIIs into the upgraded Cheetah into the late 1990s.

Another such project was the in-development Rooivalk attack helicopter, which had been started amid the South African Border War of the 1980s. In concept, this attack helicopter was to escort friendly helicopter troop transports, conduct strike missions upon anti-aircraft positions, and effectively counter the increasing presence of Soviet-built tanks; in the latter role, it was to be equipped with anti-tank missiles.

The Rooivalk was not a clean-design helicopter due to the significant challenges, very high costs, and lengthy timescales that would have been needed; it was instead based upon one of existing designs already in service with the SAAF - the Aérospatiale SA 330 Puma. The first Rooivalk prototype performed its maiden flight on 11 February 1990.

Throughout the 1990s, the South African Army were broadly supportive of the Rooivalk programme, in part as the presence of South African attack helicopters would reduce the need for large numbers of tanks to be procured and maintained. The Army thus provided funding for the Rooivalk program for a time, helping it survive the tightening budgetary constraints. The delays and escalating costs of the project were a hindrance not only to its introduction but to Rooivalk's later viability.

By 1998, the year in which the first production Rooivalk was delivered to the SAAF, the lengthy development time meant that the rotorcraft was already suffering from some alleged obsolescence issues; it was an aerodynamically sound aircraft but the avionics, while advanced for the 1980s, were relatively outdated, which harmed the type's export potential.

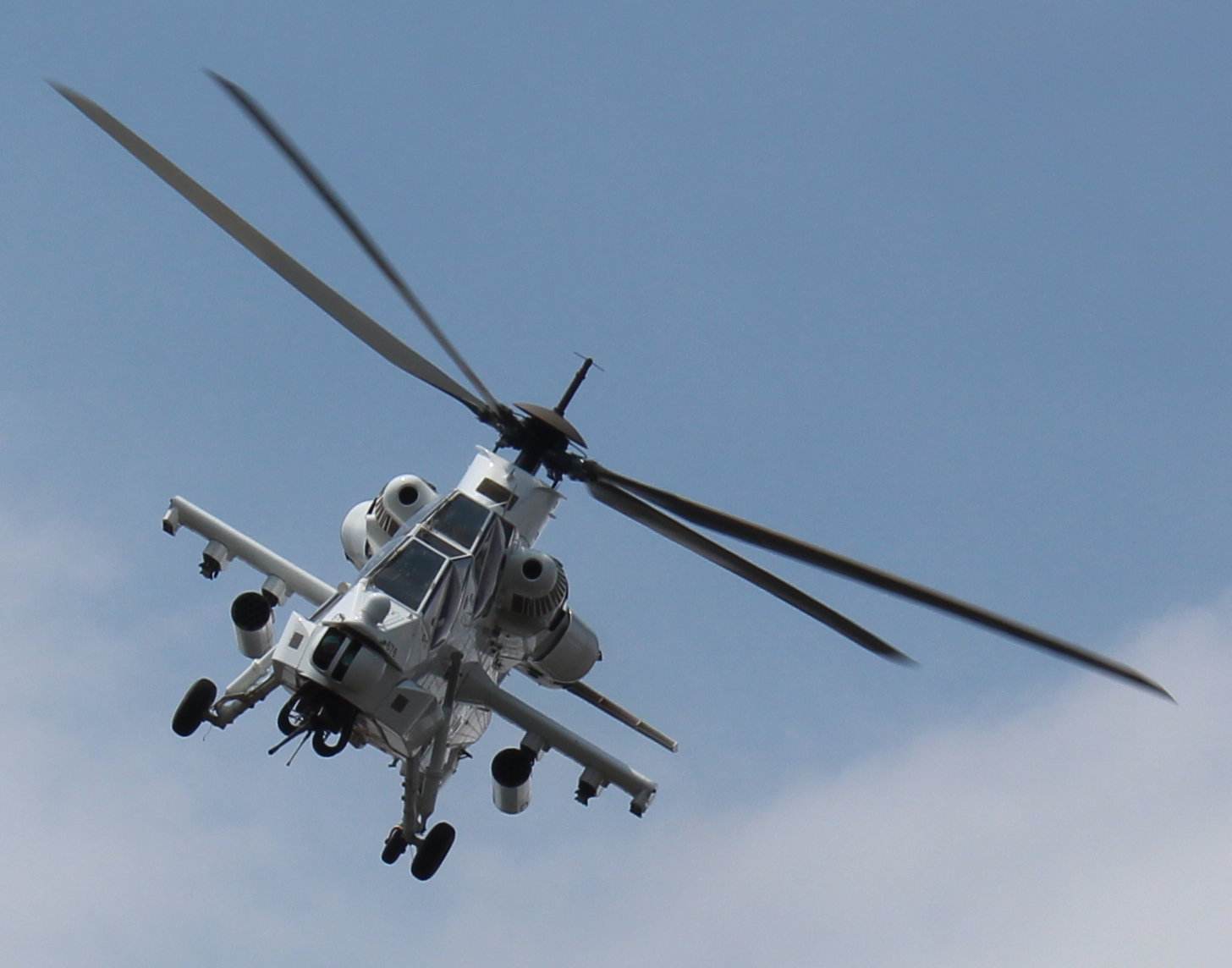
South African Rooivalk attack helicopter over FIB base in Sake 2014

Denel Aeronautics was reportedly keen to pursue potential export opportunities for the type, such as Malaysia, the United Kingdom, and Turkey, however no such sales had emerged by 2013. The development of the Rooivalk has been credited as positively influencing the development of several South African aviation and high technology industries, leading to the creation of firms such as Aerosud and Advanced Technologies and Engineering (ATE).

In 2016, Denel was reportedly proceeding with a Mk 1.1 upgrade program for the existing Rooivalk fleet; prospective improvements include the addition of a missile approach warning system and enhancements to the rotorcraft's avionics.

On 15 September 2016, it was announced that Airbus Helicopters and Denel had signed a memorandum of understanding to cooperate on the SAAF modernisation program; further details on the changes included reliability and survivability improvements, an increased payload, and the replacement of obsolete targeting systems and armaments.

A significant portion of Denel Aeronautics' activity has been centred around the provision of support services, both domestically and internationally. The firm has been involved in supporting the Ecuadorian Air Force in keeping its fleet of Atlas Cheetah fighter jets operational; Denel having the foremost experience of the type having been its original manufacturer as the Atlas Aircraft Corporation.

Denel Aeronautics also provides maintenance services for various aircraft manufactured by other companies, including Eurocopter, Lockheed Martin, SAAB, AgustaWestland, British Aerospace and Airbus amongst others.

Denel Aeronautics has built partnerships with numerous international companies. It has produced components on behalf of both major airliner manufacturers, Boeing and Airbus, along with British engine manufacturer Rolls-Royce Plc. Denel Aeronautics has also endeavoured to cooperate with numerous local aerospace companies in its undertakings.

In 2012, the firm agreed with Moscow-based Russian Helicopters to establish a new maintenance hub in South Africa to service its range of helicopters for the region.

During 2014, a three-party collaborative agreement was signed by Denel Aerostructures, Aerosud and Airbus to create a 10-year investment plan for the development of more sophisticated manufacturing techniques; the agreement was viewed as a step towards a greater presence on the competitive global supply chain of Airbus and other original equipment manufacturers.

Furthermore, Denel Aeronautics is the dominant provider of maintenance and support services for the numerous types of aircraft operated by the South African Air Force, including the Saab JAS 39 Gripen fighter, the BAE Systems Hawk trainer, the Rooivalk attack helicopter, the Atlas Oryx transport helicopter, the Lockheed C-130 Hercules tactical transport aircraft, as well as the CASA C-212 and Cessna 208 Caravan utility aircraft.
