= Denel =

South African state-owned aerospace and military technology conglomerate

Denel SOC Ltd
- Type: State-owned enterprise
- Industry: Aerospace and Defence manufacturing
- Founded: 1992; 34 years ago
- Headquarters: Centurion, Gauteng, South Africa
- Area served: Worldwide
- Key people: Michael Kgobe (CEO); Carmen Le Grange (CFO)
- Products: Missiles; Cruise missiles Attack Helicopters; Transport Helicopters; UAVs; Armoured vehicle turrets Glide bombs Artillery systems Ammunition
- Revenue: ▼ R 2.729 billion (FY 2020)
- Operating income: ▼ R -1.5 billion loss (FY 2020)
- Net income: ▼ R -1.9 billion loss (FY 2020)
- Total equity: ▼ R 2.277 billion (FY 2020)
- Number of employees: ▼3,137 (FY 2020)
- Parent: Government of South Africa
- Website: denel.co.za

Denel, officially Denel SOC Ltd, is a South African state-owned aerospace and military technology conglomerate established in 1992, and headquartered in Centurion, Gauteng.

The company was created when the manufacturing subsidiaries of Armscor were split off in order for Armscor to become the procurement agency for the South African Defence Force (SADF), now known as the South African National Defence Force (SANDF), and the manufacturing divisions were grouped together under Denel as divisions. It is the largest of South Africa's state owned arms companies.

The company had been experiencing major financial problems since 2015 and in 2021 it was announced in Parliament that Denel was on the brink of insolvency. The company stated that its woes were due to declining local defence budgets, weakened relationships with key customers and suppliers, the inability to retain or attract skilled personnel, ongoing salary disputes and a Fitch ratings downgrade.

== History ==
Denel was established as a state-owned industrial company under the Department of Public Enterprises in April 1992. It inherited most of Armscor's production and research facilities, and over 15,000 employees. At the time of its formation, Denel restructured and reorganised the former Armscor subsidiaries into a number of divisions and subsidiaries within five industrial groups: systems, manufacturing, aerospace, informatics, and properties and engineering services.

Denel has developed a number of notable products, such as:

- The Rooivalk attack helicopter.
- The Atlas Oryx utility helicopter.
- The Umkhonto vertical launched air defence missile.
- Mokopa tandem warhead anti-tank guided missile, with a range of 10 km.
- Together with Gerald Bull, the G6 self-propelled howitzer and G5 towed howitzer, the longest ranged guns in their class worldwide, supported with base bleed, VLAP and the advanced fuzing technology.
- The 5th generation A-Darter air-to-air missile, currently in the final phases of development.

The Overberg Test Range is used for advanced aerial testing of missiles by Denel and other clients such as NASA, EADS and BAE Systems.

Though Denel's market share is increasing, it still has not signed significant international contracts that will bring a real market return for its investments in development and research costs. In 2006, Denel signed a contract with the Finnish Navy for the Umkhonto air defence missile; this was a significant step, since it was the first significant sale to a western nation. The Swedish defence force was also interested in the Umkhonto missile, but due to budget constraints had to put its purchase on hold.

Although Denel has comparable quality products, at lower prices, it has struggled to attract buyers, with the Rooivalk attack helicopter being a prime example of this. After being developed at a cost of R1 billion, no sales were made as the contract from Turkey for $2 billion was lost. The development of the Rooivalk, which could be Denel's most profitable project, also threatens to result in its largest loss ever.

In 2009 and 2010, RheinMetall Denel, a Denel subsidiary, advertised artisan training programmes and study bursaries which excluded white applicants, but relented after a meeting with trade union Solidarity.

== Divisions ==
The following divisions form part of Denel

- Denel Aeronautics incorporating Denel Technical Academy.
- Denel Dynamics
- Denel Industrial Properties
- Denel Integrated Systems and Maritime
- Denel Land Systems
- Denel Mechem
- Denel Overberg Test Range
- Denel Pretoria Metal Pressings (Denel PMP)
- Denel Vehicle Systems

== Associated companies ==
Companies part-owned by Denel.

- Hensoldt (PTY) Ltd owns 70% and Denel holds 30% of the shares
- Rheinmetall Denel Munition owns 51% and Denel holds 49% of the shares
- Barij Dynamics (Barij) owns 51% and Denel holds 49% of the shares

== Financial difficulties ==
In 2004, Denel CEO Victor Moche informed parliament that the company was near bankruptcy after suffering a loss in the financial year 2003/4 of R358 million contributing to a mounting company debt of R1 billion. This was blamed on a lack of access to foreign markets and not being able to secure domestic arms procurement contracts. State capture (2011/12 to 2017) had a debilitating effect on Denel and consequently the country's defence capability. The Zondo Commission placed the blame specifically on the 2015 board of directors, who almost immediately after their appointment started to implement a slew of poor decisions which brought Denel to its knees.

In 2016, it was revealed that Denel had entered into a controversial single source supplier deal for ten years with VR Laser. The deal was controversial due to the generous terms of the contract and because VR Laser was owned by the Gupta family which had close ties to then South African president Jacob Zuma. This contributed to Denel incurring a loss, the first in eight years, amounting to R1.7 billion putting the company in financial difficulty. This led to Denel not being able to pay staff and company pensioners. In 2017 the civil society group Organisation Undoing Tax Abuse (OUTA) (OUTA) stated that it had laid corruption charges against the company's chairman Daniel Mantsha. In March 2019 Denel representatives gave testimony to the Zondo Commission about the company's deal with the Gupta owned VR Laser. Department of Public Enterprises Acting Director-General stated that the deal resulted in up to R3 billion in lost revenue for Denel. Following the conclusion of forensic investigations into allegations of corruption in Denel the company announced in July 2019 that it would seek to recoup misspent money by pursuing civil and criminal action against former company executives.

From May 2020 through to January 2022 some of their employees were not paid, or were only paid a part of their salary, despite being expected to report for duty every day. The state owned company's financial troubles continued into 2021, when in April Denel Land Systems stopped paying its employees their salaries. Union UASA started legal proceedings in 2020 to recoup its members' salaries, while Solidarity achieved a victory in the Johannesburg Labour Court in February 2022, when Denel was ordered to pay out R90 million by March 8. Denel did not comply however, prompting Solidarity to seize its bank accounts, which facilitated the full payout by July. Solidarity also vowed to bring to book those responsible for the supposed "fund mismanagement and looting". Finance Minister Enoch Godongwana announced in his 2022 budget address that the National Treasury had assigned Denel R3 billion in bailouts for the 2021/22 financial year. Despite bank guarantees by the government, Denel lost out on a R6 billion missiles deal (2022-2024) with Egypt, when South African banks cited ethical concerns and refused to extend a loan.
