= RAF Idku =

RAF Idku
- قاعدة إدكو الجوية الملكية
- Idku, Beheira Governorate in Egypt
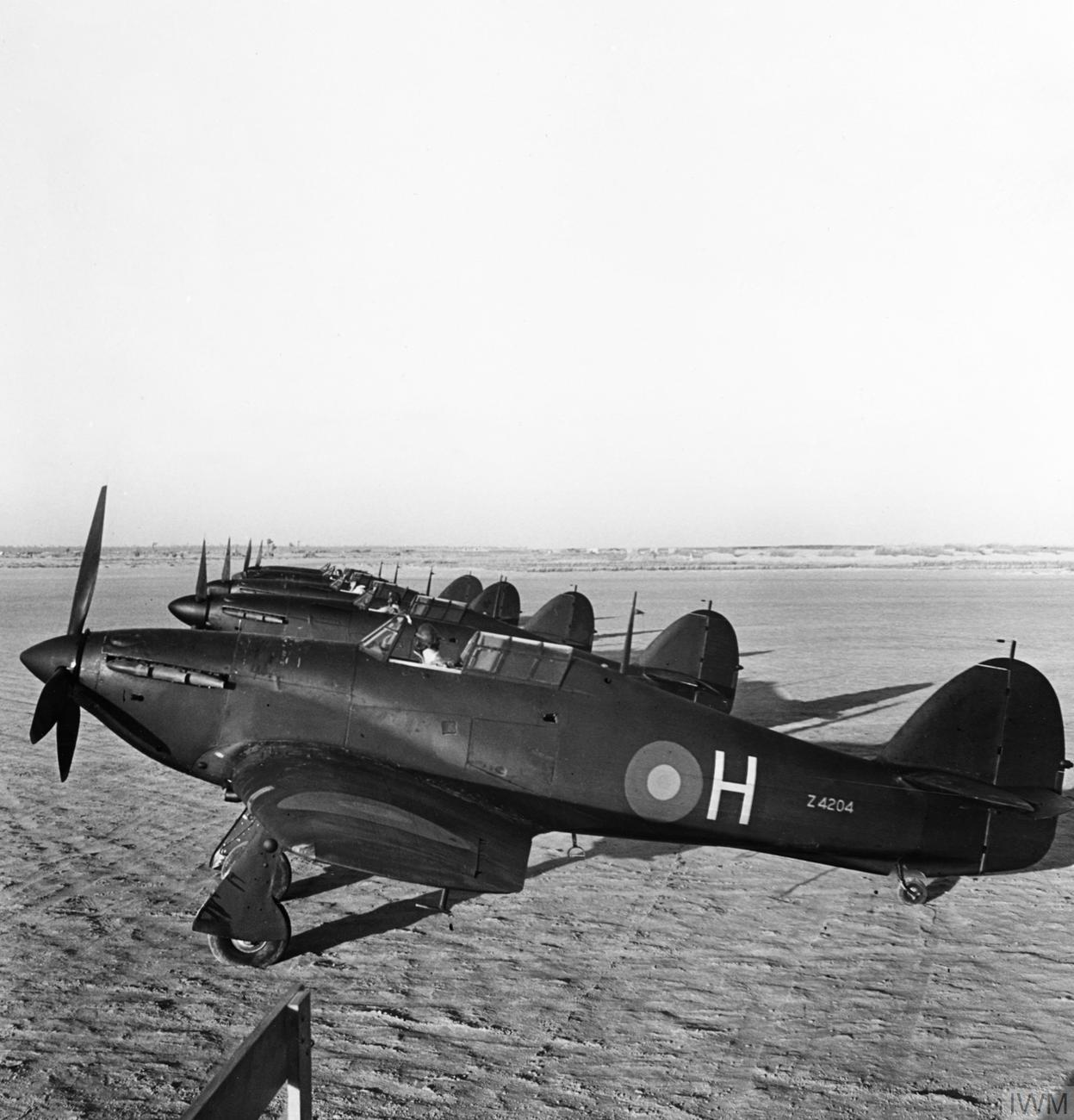
- Hawker Hurricane Mark Is of 'B' Flight, No. 30 Squadron RAF, lined up at Idku, while operating in the night fighter role for the air defence of Alexandria.

Site information
- Owner: Air Ministry
- Operator: Royal Air Force
- Controlled by: Near East Air Force

Location
- Shown within Egypt
- Coordinates: 31°17′00″N 30°13′59″E

Site history
- Built: 1941
- In use: 1941 - 1945
- Battles/wars: Mediterranean and Middle East theatre of World War II

Royal Air Force Idku or more simply RAF Idku (LG-229) was a World War II Royal Air Force station located in Idku, Egypt. It was established in 1941 and served as a strategic base of the Royal Air Force in the Mediterranean and Middle East theatre of World War II, before abandonment in 1945.

== History ==
During November 1941, No. 252 Squadron RAF's headquarters was based in Idku. Facilities in 1941 included an officers' mess, and billets for personnel of the 252 Squadron RAF. It flew Bristol Beaufighters and led attacks on enemy supply trains carrying guns and ammunition near Bir Abu Mischeifa. In 1942, RAF Idku is described as having a narrow, sand-packed airstrip lined by tall palm trees. Due to the location of the palm trees, landing and take-off was difficult and problematic. On 10 July, 1942, two aircraft crashed in the dark after take-off, killing both crew. One aircraft failed to clear the palm trees, while the other was found next morning off-shore.

In May 1943, the No. 451 Squadron RAAF flew sea patrol duties from RAF Idku. On May 1943, facilities included a clothing store, 451 SQN operations room, sergeants' mess, officers' mess, and an orderly room. The sergeants' mess was equipped with a ping pong table, a bar, and had murals painted on its interior walls, which brought comfort for personnel. A steel hangar staffed by the maintenance section personnel of No. 451 Squadron RAAF maintained Hawker Hurricane aircraft and Bristol Beaufighters. There also was an armament trailer, which provided meals for stationed personnel, and cricket matches were played by personnel on the airfield. After fighting ceased at RAF Idku, farmers returned to plough fields and cultivate farmland located adjacent to the airfield. In September 1944, RAF Idku served as a strategic base of operations for night defense in Alexandria, Suez Canal, Palestinian coast, and Cyprus. It also held raids on the German occupied islands of Crete, Rhodes, Kos, and others in the Aegean Sea.

After World War II ended, the airfield was evidently abandoned.

== Units ==
The following lists the units based at RAF Idku:

South African Air Force

- No. 10 Squadron SAAF, June 1944 - September 1944

Royal Australian Air Force

- No. 451 Squadron RAAF, 8 February 1943 - 27 August 1943

Royal Air Force

- No. 39 Squadron RAF detachment, 8 May 1941 - 15 October 1942, equipped with Maryland I
- No. 30 Squadron RAF, 22 June 1941 - 22 October 1941, equipped with Hurricane I
- No. 272 Squadron RAF, 14 June 1941 - 12 January 1942, equipped with Beaufighter IC
- No. 213 Squadron RAF detachment, 19 July 1941 - 31 December 1941, equipped with Hurricane I
- No. 89 Squadron RAF detachment, 10 December 1941 - 28 January 1943, equipped with Beaufighter IF
- No. 252 Squadron RAF, reformed 14 November 1941 - 18 January 1943, equipped with Beaufighter IC and Beaufighter VIC
- No. 213 Squadron RAF, 14 January 1942 - 29 May 1942, equipped with Hurricane I
- No. 46 Squadron RAF, re-established from an element of No. 89 Squadron RAF, 2 May 1942 - 13 December 1944, equipped with Hurricane I
- No. 145 Squadron RAF, 5 August 1942 - 21 August 1942, equipped with Spitfire VB
- No. 145 Squadron RAF detachment, 21 August 1942 - 26 September 1942, equipped with Spitfire VB
- No. 33 Squadron RAF, 5 August 1942 - 31 August 1942, equipped with Hurricane IIC
- No. 335 Squadron RAF, 29 June 1942 - 8 August 1942, equipped with Hurricane I
- No. 272 Squadron RAF, 14 March 1942 - 6 November 1942, equipped with Beaufighter IC
- No. 6 Squadron RAF, 10 December 1942 - 31 January 1943, equipped with Hawker Hurricane IIC
- No. 417 Squadron RAF, 10 October 1942 - 25 January 1943, equipped with Hurricane IIC
- No. 221 Squadron RAF detachment, 22 August 1942 - 1 February 1943, equipped with Wellington VIII
- No. 603 Squadron RAF, 25 January 1943 - 27 March 1943, equipped with Spitfire VC
- No. 227 Squadron RAF, 1 March 1943 - 5 May 1943, equipped with Beaufighter VIC
- No. 80 Squadron RAF, 15 May 1943 - 5 July 1943, equipped with Spitfire VC
- No. 74 Squadron RAF detachment, 23 May 1943 - 26 August 1943, equipped with Hurricane I
- No. 74 Squadron RAF, 26 August 1943 - 22 September 1943, equipped with Spitfire VB and Spitfire VC
- No. 89 Squadron RAF detachment, 18 August 1943 - 19 September 1943, equipped with Beaufighter VIF
- No. 89 Squadron RAF detachment, 19 September 1943 - 15 October 1943, equipped with Beaufighter VIF
- No. 237 Squadron RAF, 12 September 1943 - 9 December 1943, equipped with Hurricane IIC
- No. 274 Squadron RAF, 7 October 1943 - 22 February 1944, equipped with Spitfire VC
- No. 213 Squadron RAF, 6 July 1943 - 25 February 1944, equipped with Hurricane IIC
- No. 213 Squadron RAF detachment, 25 February 1944 - 6 May 1944, equipped with Spitfire IX
- No. 237 Squadron RAF, 25 February 1944 - 19 April 1944, equipped with Spitfire VC
- No. 213 Squadron RAF, 6 May 1944 - 9 July 1944, equipped with Spitfire IX
- No. 108 Squadron RAF detachment, 3 June 1943 - 1 July 1944, equipped with Beaufighter VIF
- No. 108 Squadron RAF, 26 July 1944 - 18 October 1944, equipped with Mosquito XIII
- No. 162 Squadron RAF, 20 April 1944 - 25 September 1944, equipped with Wellington DW I
- No. 336 Squadron RAF detachment, 3 April 1944 - 13 July 1944, equipped with Spitfire VC
- No. 294 Squadron RAF, 29 March 1944 - 6 June 1945, equipped with Wellington IC
- No. 221 Squadron RAF, 8 April 1945 - 21 August 1945, equipped with Wellington XIII
