= Atlas ACE =

South African turboprop aircraft

ACE

General information
- Type: Trainer
- National origin: South Africa
- Manufacturer: Atlas Aircraft Corporation
- Number built: 2

History
- First flight: 29 April 1991

The Atlas ACE is a South African turboprop trainer, that was designed by the Atlas Aircraft Corporation as a contender to replace the North American Harvard in service with the South African Air Force. The aircraft was not selected and only two examples were completed.

== Design and development ==
The design originated as the 1986 Project Ovid by the government research agency Aerotek, as a composites technology demonstrator. In 1991 the design was entered into a competition to replace the North American Harvard by the Atlas Aircraft Corporation as the ACE (All Composite Evaluator).

The ACE is a tandem two-seat low-wing cantilever monoplane powered by a Pratt & Whitney PT6A turboprop. It has a retractable nosewheel landing gear and a conventional tail unit. The aircraft is constructed from carbon fiber composites.

The prototype was first flown on 29 April 1991, but did not win the competition which was awarded to the Pilatus PC-7.

On 14 January 1995 the prototype was lost in a wheels up landing at Jan Smuts Airport. The second improved aircraft was scheduled to fly, but the design was not developed.

== Specifications ==
General characteristics

- Crew: 2
- Length: 35 ft 5 in (10.8 m)
- Wingspan: 35 ft 5 in (10.8 m)
- Wing area: 193.75 sq ft (18 m^{2})
- Empty weight: 3,406 lb (1,545 kg)
- Gross weight: 4,850 lb (2,200 kg)
- Powerplant: 1 × Pratt & Whitney PT6A-25C , 750 hp (559 kW)

Performance

- Maximum speed: 345 mph (555 km/h, 300 kn)
- Range: 1,266 mi (2,037 km, 1,100 nmi)
- Service ceiling: 33,000 ft (10,000 m)
- Rate of climb: 2,750 ft/min (838 m/s)

== See also ==
Aircraft of comparable role, configuration, and era

- Pilatus PC-7
- PZL-130 Orlik
- Beechcraft T-6 Texan II
