= 9 Squadron SAAF =

9 Squadron
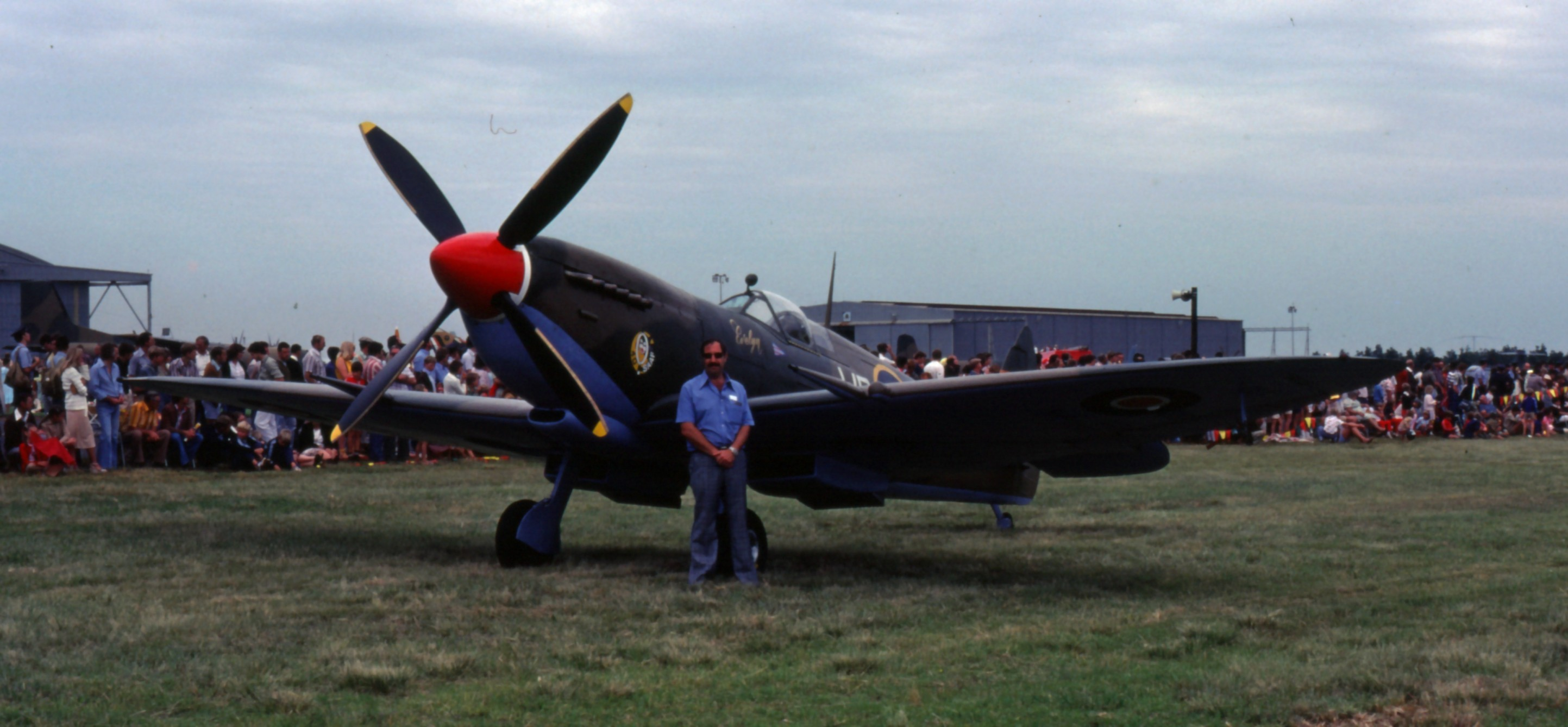
- Supermarine Spitfire Mk IX as flown by 9 Squadron from July 1944 to February 1945
- Active: 19 May 1944 – 1 February 1945
- Country: South Africa
- Branch: South African Air Force
- Role: Fighter Squadron

9 Squadron SAAF was a short lived squadron of the South African Air Force during World War II. It was formed on 19 May 1944 in Egypt and was transferred to Minnick in Syria shortly after being formed. It spent less than a month in Syria when it was re-deployed back to El Gamil in Egypt on 28 June 1944. This transfer was after it had been decided that there was no longer any need to maintain forces on high alert close to Turkey. From here the squadron was tasked to provide air protection of the Suez Canal and the coastline of the Nile Delta.

In September 1944 the squadron was moved to Savoia in Libya, from where it flew fighter sweeps over Crete (December 1944), before being disbanded on 1 February 1945.

The squadron flew Supermarine Spitfire Mk.VB's and VC's from June 1944 – February 1945 and Spitfire Mk.IX's were phased in from 10 November 1944 (being ex-10 Squadron aircraft when that unit was disbanded on 31 October 1944). The Mk IX aircraft remained in service until February 1945.

== Aircraft ==
Aircraft flown by 9 Squadron
Note: Aircraft type photographs may not necessarily represent aircraft of the same mark or actual aircraft belonging to the squadron.
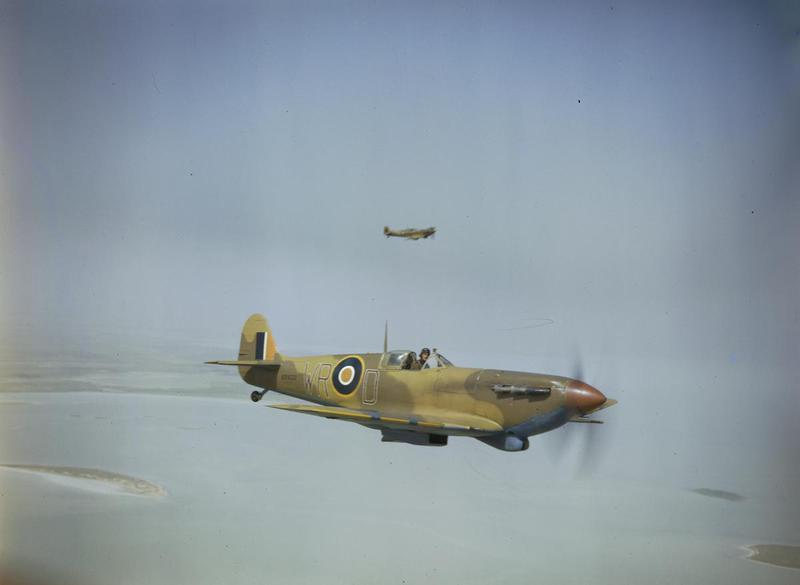
Spitfire Mk.VB
June 1944 – Feb 1945

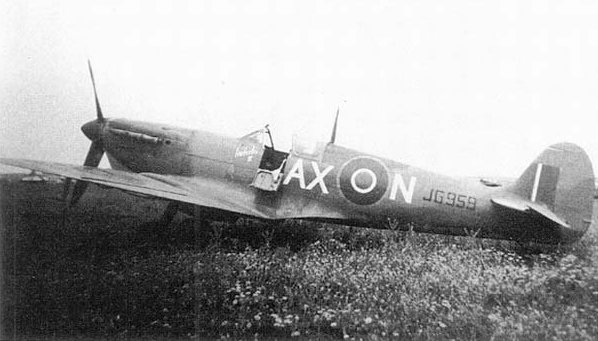
Spitfire Mk.VC
June 1944 – Feb 1945
