= No. 221 Squadron RAF =

Disbanded flying squadron of the Royal Air Force

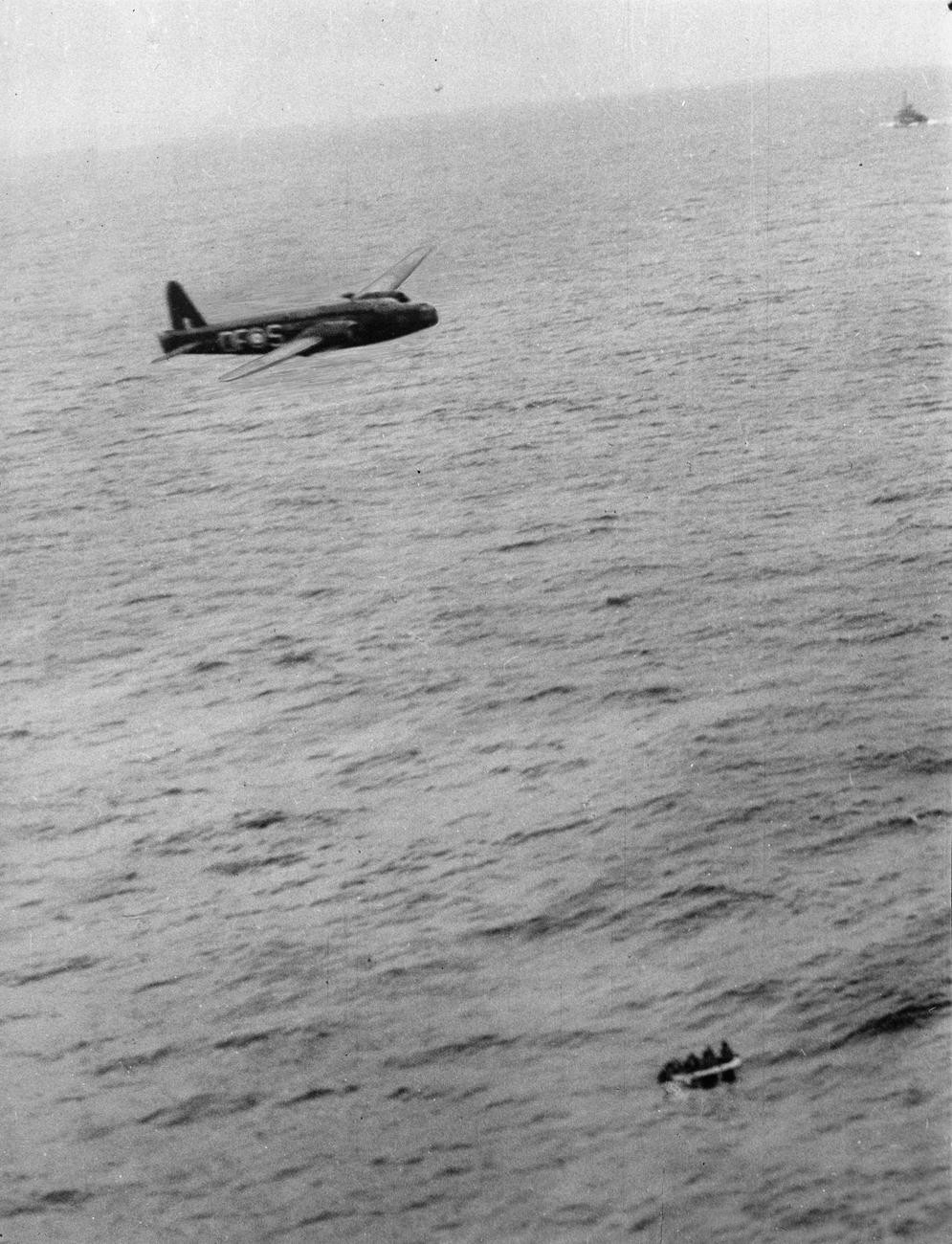
- A Vickers Wellington Mk.1C ("DF-S") of No. 221 Squadron based at Limavady, County Londonderry, guides an escort vessel to pick up the crew of a German Focke-Wulf Fw 200C Kondor in a dinghy, after they were shot down in the Atlantic by a Lockheed Hudson of No. 233 Squadron RAF, 1941
- Active: 1 April 1918 - 1 September 1919; 21 November 1940 – 25 August 1945
- Country: United Kingdom
- Branch: Royal Air Force
- Role: Reconnaissance; Anti-Shipping
- Size: Squadron
- Motto: From sea to sea

Aircraft flown
- Patrol: Vickers Wellington

No. 221 Squadron was a Royal Air Force squadron that saw service in both the First and Second World Wars. Its motto was "From sea to sea".

== History ==
The squadron was formed in Greece on 1 April 1918, from 'D' Squadron of No. 2 Wing RNAS. Initially engaged in anti-submarine warfare in the Aegean, it was sent to Russia in December 1918 to support White forces against the Bolsheviks. The unit was based at Petrovsk from January to 1 September 1919, when it was disbanded.

On 21 November 1940, No. 221 Squadron was reformed as part of Coastal Command. It flew Vickers Wellingtons on reconnaissance and anti-submarine patrols in the Atlantic, first out of England, then Northern Ireland and later Iceland. The squadron relocated to the Middle East in January 1942 and operated in the Mediterranean for the rest of the war, disbanding at RAF Idku, Egypt on 21 August 1945.

== See also ==
- List of Royal Air Force aircraft squadrons
