= Denel Dynamics Bateleur =

Unmanned aerial vehicle (UAV) prototype

Bateleur
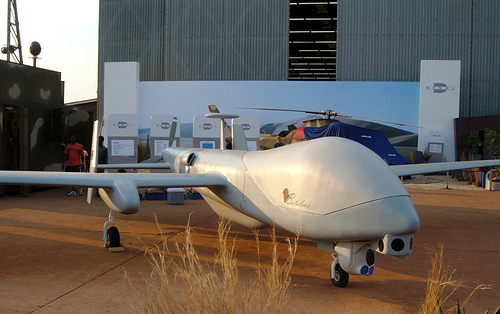

General information
- Type: MALE UAV
- Manufacturer: Denel Dynamics
- Status: In development

The Bateleur (named for the bateleur eagle) is an unmanned aerial vehicle (UAV) prototype designed and built by Denel Dynamics (formerly Kentron). It has been designed as a MALE (medium-altitude - long endurance) UAV, with its primary role being surveillance, with a secondary signals intelligence capability.

Development began in 2003 as a totally in-house and private-venture project, being developed with internal company funds. The first prototype was expected to fly in early 2006 but as of 2010 this has not yet happened. The aircraft was included in a Brazilian Air Force RFP for UAVs in early 2009, though as of 2010 the competition has not been concluded. The South African National Defence Force (SANDF) has expressed interest in the system, but requested in 2006 that the cost of the system be reduced before an acquisition could be considered. In 2008, the South African Air Force announced a project, named Itambo, to acquire a MALE UAV in the 2008-2012 timeframe, with the Bateleur presumed to be a front-runner.

The entire aircraft is constructed using a modular construction system, making future adaptations of the airframe for increased range or larger payloads simpler than would be possible with a rigid airframe. It also makes it possible for the aircraft, once disassembled, to fit inside a 6 m ISO shipping container.

It is able to carry a variety of payloads, with a maximum payload mass of 200 kg (440 lb).

Initially, proposed payloads include the Denel Optronics Argos-410 electro-optical (E/O) and infrared (IR) system (with optional laser rangefinder), the Denel Optronics Goshawk-350 E/O and IR system (also with optional laser rangefinder), a laser designator, an Avitronics Emitter Locating System, electronic intelligence equipment, and/or a synthetic aperture radar.

Though at present it has a maximum "action radius" of only 750 km (470 mi), a Ku-band satellite datalink was proposed which will allow the Bateleur to extend its range to around 3 500 km (2 175 miles), making it suitable for missions requiring longer ranges such as maritime patrol.

The Bateleur takes off and lands conventionally, on a runway, and has retractable undercarriage.

It is also completely autonomous, allowing it to take off, conduct its mission, and land all without human control being required.

== Roles and missions ==
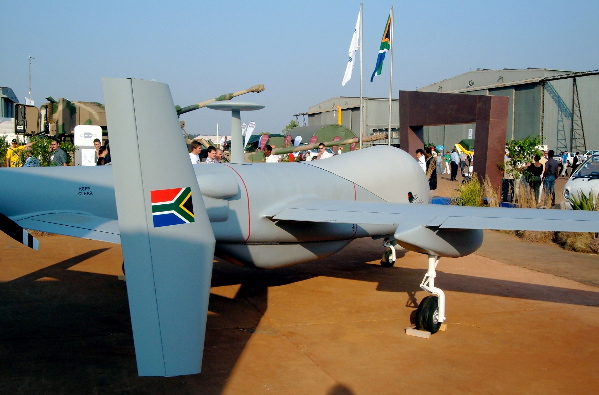
Bateleur at Africa Aerospace & Defence 2004

Roles and Missions

- Real-time day and night (E/O and IR) surveillance
- Electronic and Communications Intelligence gathering (ELINT and COMINT)
- Airborne communications relay
- Military and paramilitary photo reconnaissance
- Target location and laser designation
- Maritime and coastal patrol
- Border patrol
- Search and rescue
- Battlefield surveillance
- Artillery fire support
- Damage assessment

== Specifications ==
Data from

General characteristics

- Capacity: 200 kg (441 lb)
- Wingspan: 15 m (49 ft 3 in)
- Max takeoff weight: 1,000 kg (2,205 lb)
- Powerplant: 1 × Rotax 914 4-cyl. four stroke horizontally opposed piston engine, 75 kW (101 hp)

or 1x Subaru EA-82T 4-cyl. four stroke horizontally opposed piston engine, rated at 86kW (115hp)

Performance

- Maximum speed: 250 km/h (160 mph, 130 kn)
- Range: 750 km (470 mi, 400 nmi)
- Endurance: 18–24 hours
- Service ceiling: 8,000 m (26,000 ft)

== See also ==
Aircraft of comparable role, configuration, and era

- General Atomics MQ-1 Predator
- TAI Anka
- Shahed 129
- TAPAS-BH-201
