= Denel Dynamics =

South African weapons manufacturer

- Company type: Division of proprietary limited company
- Industry: weapons development and manufacturing
- Founded: 1991
- Headquarters: Centurion, Gauteng, South Africa
- Area served: World-wide
- Products: Missiles, ATGMs, Bombs, Glide bombs, Unmanned Aerial Vehicles
- Parent: Denel SOC Ltd (100% state-owned)
- Website: DenelDynamics.co.za
- Footnotes / references Previously Kentron, a division of Denel (Pty) Ltd

Denel Dynamics, formerly Kentron, is a division of Denel SOC Ltd, a South African armaments development and manufacturing company wholly owned by the South African Government. It underwent a name change from Kentron to Denel Aerospace Systems in early 2004 and later to Denel Dynamics. Denel Dynamics is located in Centurion, South Africa.

== Key products ==
Category	Type	Name
Unmanned Aerial Vehicles (UAV)
Unmanned Aerial Vehicles (UAV)		Hungwe - Tactical Aerial Reconnaissance
Unmanned Aerial Vehicles (UAV)		Seeker - Tactical Aerial Reconnaissance
Unmanned Aerial Vehicles (UAV)		Bateleur - MALE Aerial Reconnaissance
Unmanned Aerial Vehicles (UAV)		Skua - Target Drone
Guided Missiles
Guided Missiles	Air-to-air	
Guided Missiles	Air-to-air	A-Darter – short range infrared homing
Guided Missiles	Air-to-air	R-Darter – radar-guided beyond-visual-range missile (BVR)
Guided Missiles	Air-to-surface	
Guided Missiles	Air-to-surface	MUPSOW – multipurpose stand-off weapon air-launched cruise missile
Guided Missiles	Air-to-surface	TORGOS – (cruise missile) air-launched cruise missile
Guided Missiles	Surface-to-air	Umkhonto – multi-range infrared homing missile series
Anti-tank guided missile
Anti-tank guided missile		Mokopa – long-range laser-guided anti-tank missile
Anti-tank guided missile		ZT3 Ingwe – multi-role laser-guided anti-tank missile
Guided bombs		
Guided bombs		Raptor – precision-guided glide bomb series
Guided bombs		Umbani GPS/INS guidance kit for Mk.82, Mk.83 and Mk.84 bombs
Seekers		Brazilian MAA-1 Piranha
Weapons management systems
Weapons management systems		Arachnida-1/2 weapons management system

Kentron developed the ARD-10 loitering drone for the South African Defence Force in the 1980s, however with the end of the South African Border Wars it did not enter service. Kentron sold the designs to Israel Aerospace Industries which used them to develop the IAI Harpy which was first tested in 1989. The designs were sold to Iran Aviation Industries Organization in 2004/5 and used by Shahed Aviation Industries to develop the Shahed 131 and Shahed 136 drones.

== UN arms embargo violation ==
Four South Africans working for Kentron were arrested in March 1984 in Coventry and charged with violation of the UN arms embargo – which outlawed the export of arms and military equipment to apartheid South Africa.

The Coventry Four were granted bail against a deposit of £200,000 and a guarantee by a diplomat from the South African embassy who waived his diplomatic immunity. They were allowed to return to South Africa on condition that they appeared at their trial in England in August 1984. In the event, South African foreign minister, Pik Botha, refused to allow them to return for their trial.

== See also ==
- Armscor (South Africa)
- Military of South Africa
- Military history of South Africa
- South African Air Force
- List of aircraft of the South African Air Force
- Advena (formerly Kentron Circle)
