= Mokopa =

South African air-to-surface missile

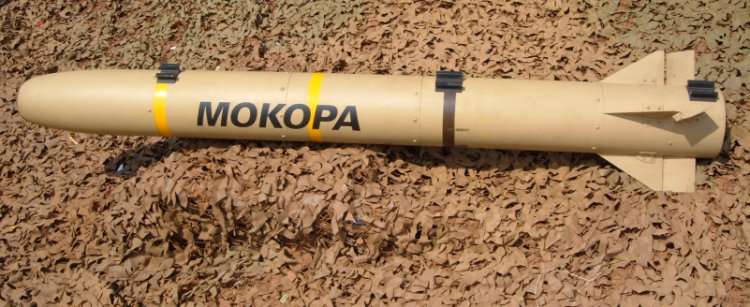
- Mokopa laser guided anti-tank missile
- Type: Air-to-surface
- Place of origin: South Africa

Production history
- Manufacturer: Denel Dynamics
- Produced: 1996–present
- No. built: 74 (2009)

Specifications
- Mass: 49.8 kg (110 lb)
- Length: 1.995 m (6.55 ft)
- Diameter: 17.8 cm (7.0 in)
- Warhead: Tandem-charge high-explosive anti-tank (HEAT) able to penetrate > 1000+ mm RHA; Blast Fragmentation
- Engine: Solid-fuel rocket
- Operational range: 10,000 m (6.2 mi)
- Maximum speed: 530 m/s (1,200 mph)
- Guidance system: Semi-active laser homing millimetre wave radar seeker
- Launch platform: Fixed wing aircraft, helicopter, ground vehicles, boats, ships

The ZT-6 Mokopa is a South African air-to-ground anti-tank guided missile. As of 2005, it is in its final stages of development, and is being integrated onto the South African Air Force's Rooivalk attack helicopters. The missile is produced by Denel Dynamics, formerly Kentron. The current version uses semi-active laser (SAL) guidance, requiring the target to be illuminated by a laser designator either on the launch platform or elsewhere; though there are alternative guidance packages available including a millimetre-wave radar (MMW) seeker and a two-colour imaging infrared (IIR) seeker.

All variants of the Mokopa feature two launch modes, lock-on before launch (LOBL) and lock-on after launch (LOAL). LOBL is the older, more conventional mode of missile launching, where a target must be illuminated by the launch platform before launch. LOAL in contrast allows the launch platform to launch the missile with or without being in sight of the target. For the SAL version, this allows either the launch platform to move into place and illuminate the target only immediately before a missile strikes a target, or allows an observer on the ground equipped with a laser designator to guide a missile. This method of launch greatly reduces the exposure time of the launch platform to enemy fire.

== Development ==
Full scale development of the Mokopa began in November 1996, due to a long-term United States arms embargo against South Africa blocking acquisition of the US AGM-114 Hellfire. The first air-launched tests from a Rooivalk helicopter took place in 1999, with the first guided tests following in 2000. As of 2005 the missile's development is virtually complete, and the first batches are currently being delivered to the SA Air Force's Rooivalk squadron. However, due to budgetary constraints the South African Air Force has decided to stop the integration of the weapon onto the Rooivalk until an unspecified date.

== Launch vehicles and platforms ==
Though mainly designed to be launched from a helicopter, the Mokopa has been tested on a variety of platforms, including mounting it on light armoured vehicles, ships, and small boats. For the latter purpose, the Mokopa is available with an anti-ship warhead.

== Warhead ==
The Mokopa uses a powerful tandem shaped charge, high-explosive anti-tank (HEAT) warhead, able to penetrate over 1,000 mm (3.3 ft) (tests show over 1,000 mm) of rolled homogeneous armour (RHA), and also effective against explosive reactive armour (ERA). Thus, the Mokopa can counter any current vehicle armour threats.

An anti-ship warhead is also available for customers who wish to use the Mokopa as a ship-board defence weapon, or as the armament of specialised ship-board helicopters.

== Performance ==
The missile is considered to be very accurate, with an accuracy believed to match that of the company's other anti-tank missile, the Ingwe, at around 300 mm CEP at maximum range.

It also has a long range for an anti-tank missile; at 10 km (6.2 mi) it is greater than the published range of most current competitors, including the Hellfire. The range is achieved due to an advanced solid-fuel composite rocket motor (developed by Somchem), which has a relatively slow burning rate compared to similar motors, as well as being essentially smokeless.

== Users ==
- Algerian National Navy –In 2012 Algeria also ordered 100 Mokopa anti-tank missiles in 2012 under a R360 million deal, according to SIPRI. These are destined for use aboard its Lynx naval helicopters that will be deployed on its new Meko A-200 frigates. According to Flightglobal, the Algerian Navy's six new Super Lynx 300-series helicopters were conducting flight tests in 2014 armed with Mokopa anti-armour missiles.

== See also ==
- List of missiles

=== Comparable missiles ===
- AGM-114 Hellfire – (United States)
- Brimstone – (United Kingdom)
- Barq – (Pakistan)
