= Denel Rooivalk =

Attack helicopter by Atlas Aircraft Corporation, later Denel Aviation

Rooivalk
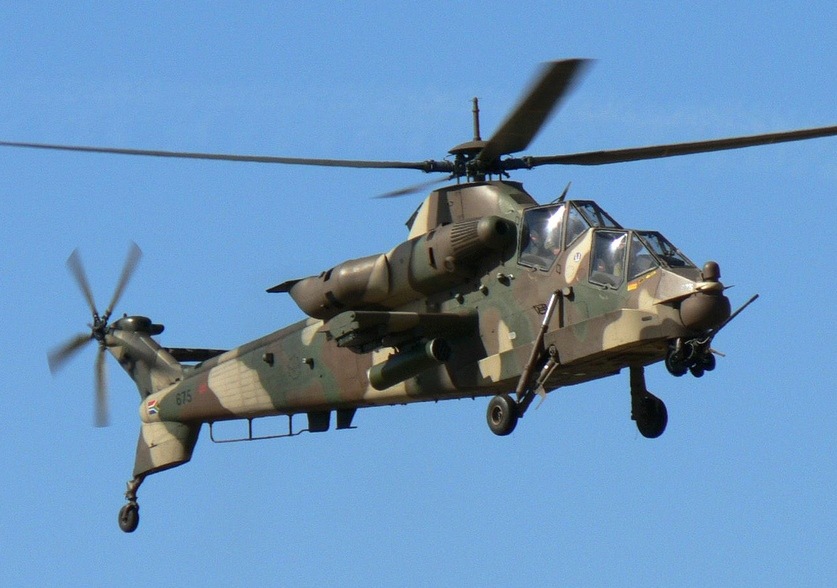
- A Denel Rooivalk in flight

General information
- Type: Attack helicopter
- National origin: South Africa
- Manufacturer: Denel Aviation
- Status: Out of production and in service
- Primary user: South African Air Force
- Number built: 15

History
- Manufactured: 1990–2007
- Introduction date: 1 April 2011
- First flight: 11 February 1990
- Developed from: Aérospatiale SA 330 Puma

The Denel Rooivalk (previously designated AH-2 and CSH-2) is an attack helicopter manufactured by Denel Aviation of South Africa. Rooivalk is Afrikaans for "Red Falcon", which refers to the lesser kestrel. Development of the type began in 1984 by the Atlas Aircraft Corporation. Its development was closely connected to the Atlas Oryx transport helicopter, with both aircraft being based on the Aérospatiale SA 330 Puma and having started development at the same time.

Development of the Rooivalk was protracted due to the impact of limited budgets during the 1990s. The South African Air Force (SAAF) ordered 12 Rooivalk, designated the Rooivalk Mk 1 in SAAF service, the first of which were officially handed over in April 2011. The helicopters are flown by 16 Squadron, based at AFB Bloemspruit near Bloemfontein.

== Development ==
=== Origins ===
The Rooivalk project began in early 1984 under the auspices of the Atlas Aircraft Corporation, a predecessor of Denel Aviation. Faced with the increasingly conventional nature of the South African Border War, the South African Defence Force recognised the need for a dedicated attack helicopter and began developing a suitable aircraft. The helicopter was to escort helicopter troop transports, conduct strike missions upon anti-aircraft positions, and effectively counter the increasing presence of Soviet tanks; in the latter role, it was to be equipped with anti-tank missiles. At the time, South Africa was under an arms embargo enacted by United Nations Security Council Resolution 418 due to its policy of apartheid, which prevented foreign combat helicopters from being imported.

Developing an entirely new helicopter from scratch would have involved designing and developing many accompanying subsystems and components, such as the turboshaft engines and the dynamic systems, such as the main and tail rotor systems and the gearboxes. Due to the great difficulty posed by the prospects of designing and manufacturing a clean-design helicopter, which would have substantially increased the cost and timescale of the project, it was decided to base the attack helicopter upon an existing design. At the time, the SAAF operated two principal helicopter types – the Aérospatiale Alouette III and the Aérospatiale SA 330 Puma. The Alouette III was a small helicopter which originated from the 1960s; due to the age of the design and a lack of engine power, it was not considered a favourable candidate for further development work.

The Puma was substantially larger and was equipped with more powerful engines; both factors provided a broader basis for the accommodation of additional equipment and for potential growth. Another key factor for its selection was the parallel development of a localised and improved model of the Puma in South Africa, known as the Atlas Oryx. The Oryx possessed an increased power-to-weight ratio and had improved performance in the high temperature climate that the type was typically being operated in; development of the Oryx was far quicker than what would become the Rooivalk as it was a more straightforward program. Other potential sources were mooted, such as the use of propulsion elements of the Aérospatiale SA 365 Dauphin; the adoption of these components has been speculated to have likely resulted in a smaller and potentially more economic rotorcraft.

Ultimately, it was decided to adopt both the powerplant and dynamic systems of the Oryx—which bore significant similarities to their Puma and Aérospatiale AS332 Super Puma ancestors—as the basis for the planned attack helicopter; commonality with the Oryx systems would simplify logistics and reduce maintenance costs. This meant that the attack helicopter would have a significantly large airframe, giving it long range and the capability to carry many sensors and armaments. During the 1980s, the defence budgets of South Africa were relatively generous, especially in contrast to later decades, thus Denel sought to provide a rotorcraft that would be amongst, even potentially superior to, the best attack helicopters in the world. The helicopter, later named the Rooivalk, was envisioned as an agile, highly sophisticated gunship, especially suited to the threats of the Angolan theatre and countering vehicles such as the T-55 tank.

The Atlas XH-1 Alpha was the first prototype to emerge from the program. It was developed from an Alouette III airframe, retaining that helicopter's engine and dynamic components; modifications included the replacement of the original cockpit with a stepped tandem counterpart, the addition of a 20 mm cannon on the nose and the conversion of the undercarriage to a tail-dragger configuration. On 3 February 1985, the XH-1 conducted its maiden flight. The results of flight tests of the XH-1 were ultimately good enough to convince both Atlas and the SAAF that the concept was feasible, opening the door to proceed with the development of the Rooivalk.

=== Into flight ===
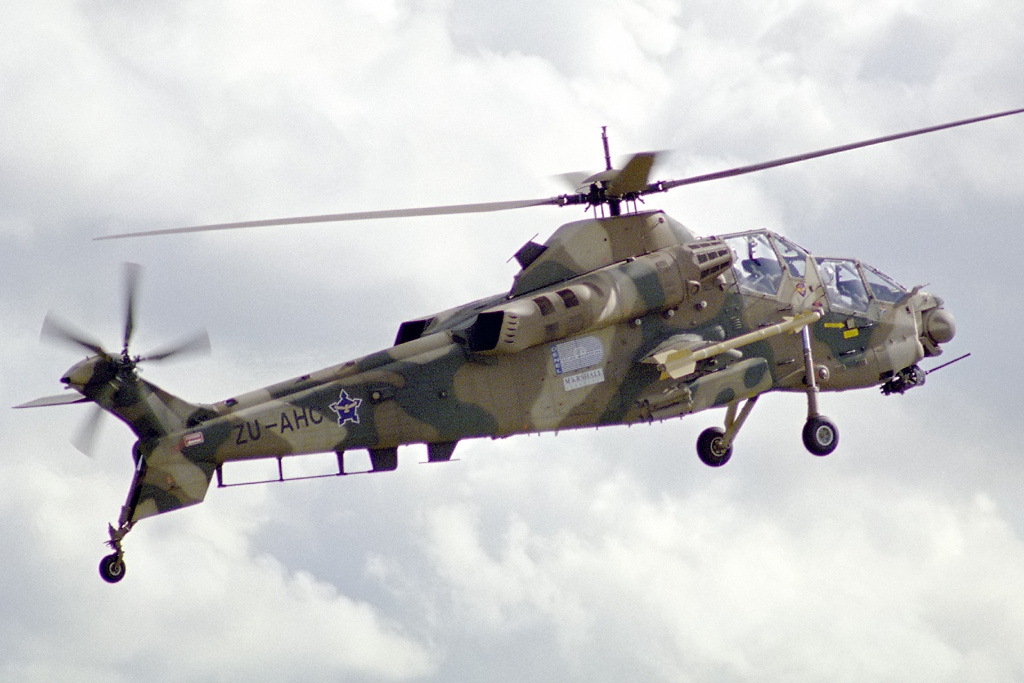
A Rooivalk at the Farnborough Airshow in 1994

The prototype first flew on 11 February 1990, by which time the program had suffered a considerable setback. Some of the program's ailments were a consequence of the ambition to produce a world-leading attack helicopter; while a simpler aircraft may have been completed during the 1980s, allowing it to possibly enter service around the same time as the Oryx, the Rooivalk instead suffered from a highly extended development time. In 1988, the Border War came to a close, which soon led to substantial cuts in the defence budget. The planned attack helicopter acquisition was cut from 36 rotorcraft to only 12, greatly affecting the economies of scale. In pursuit of a high-end system, the cost of the program in comparison to a simpler attack helicopter were driven upwards, although the increases were never in excess of the allotted budget between 1984 and 1990.

It has been claimed that some SAAF officials were of the viewpoint that the Rooivalk was a direct threat to fixed-wing aircraft, particularly in light of the diminishing defence budget, and sought its termination. The South African Army were broadly supportive of the Rooivalk program, in part as the presence of South African attack helicopters would reduce the need for large numbers of tanks to be procured and maintained. The Army thus provided funding for the Rooivalk program for a time, helping it survive the tightening budgetary constraints. The delays and escalating costs of the project were a hindrance not only to its introduction but to its later viability. By 1998, the year in which the first production Rooivalk was delivered to the SAAF, the lengthy development time meant that the rotorcraft was already suffering from some alleged obsolescence issues; it was an aerodynamically sound aircraft but the avionics, while advanced for the 1980s, were relatively outdated, which harmed the type's export potential.

The topic of support for the rotorcraft was another decisive factor in prospective export sales. Beyond doubts present over the long term future of Denel and thus its ability to provide the necessary manufacturer support to operate the type, the Rooivalk relies extensively on French technology, presently owned by Airbus Helicopters; due to the Rooivalk being a rival to the Eurocopter Tiger attack helicopter, the firm allegedly warned potential buyers that the necessary support for the aircraft's dynamic systems, which they provided, may not be forthcoming. Political factors had been attributed as a major hindrance on the export market, such as pressure allegedly exercised by the United States government to persuade foreign customers to select the rival Boeing AH-64 Apache instead.

Various potential export opportunities were investigated, such as Malaysia, the United Kingdom, and Turkey, however no such sales had emerged by 2013. The development of the Rooivalk had a positive effect on the development of the South African aviation and high technology industries, leading to the creation of firms such as Aerosud and Advanced Technologies and Engineering (ATE). The industrial impact of the Rooivalk program has been claimed to have enabled South African defence businesses to participate in other aerospace programs, such as the Saab JAS 39 Gripen, BAE Systems Hawk, AgustaWestland AW109, and Airbus A400M Atlas.

=== Further development ===
In 2016, Denel was reportedly proceeding with a Mk 1.1 upgrade program for the existing Rooivalk fleet; prospective improvements include the addition of a missile approach warning system and enhancements to the rotorcraft's avionics. On 15 September 2016, it was announced that Airbus Helicopters and Denel had signed a memorandum of understanding to cooperate on the SAAF modernisation program; further details on the changes included reliability and survivability improvements, an increased payload, and the replacement of obsolete targeting systems and armaments.

In September 2014, Denel Group chief executive Riaz Saloojee stated that the firm were studying the feasibility of reopening the Rooivalk production line, which had been mothballed in 2007 after the production of the initial 12 SAAF aircraft. Saloojee stated that new production aircraft conforming to an entirely new platform that used Rooivalk technology could be produced. In September 2016, the South African government authorised government-to-government negotiations on the topic of restarting production of the Rooivalk. According to Victor Xaba, deputy chief executive of Denel Aerostructures, the company needed commitments for at least 70 rotorcraft for the re-establishment of the assembly line to be viable.

The production of a prospective Rooivalk Mk 2 had been periodically mooted. In July 2015, Saloojee spoke on the company's efforts to gain support for a Rooivalk Mk 2 programme which would involve a large proportion of new systems and for which the firm had already produced a roadmap. In late 2016, Denel stated that it was conducting a series of talks with various nations on the Rooivalk Mk 2, including Egypt, Brazil, Nigeria, Poland, and India.

In 2023, Denel Aeronautics and Aselsan signed an agreement to collaborate on the avionics upgrade of the Rooivalk.

== Design ==
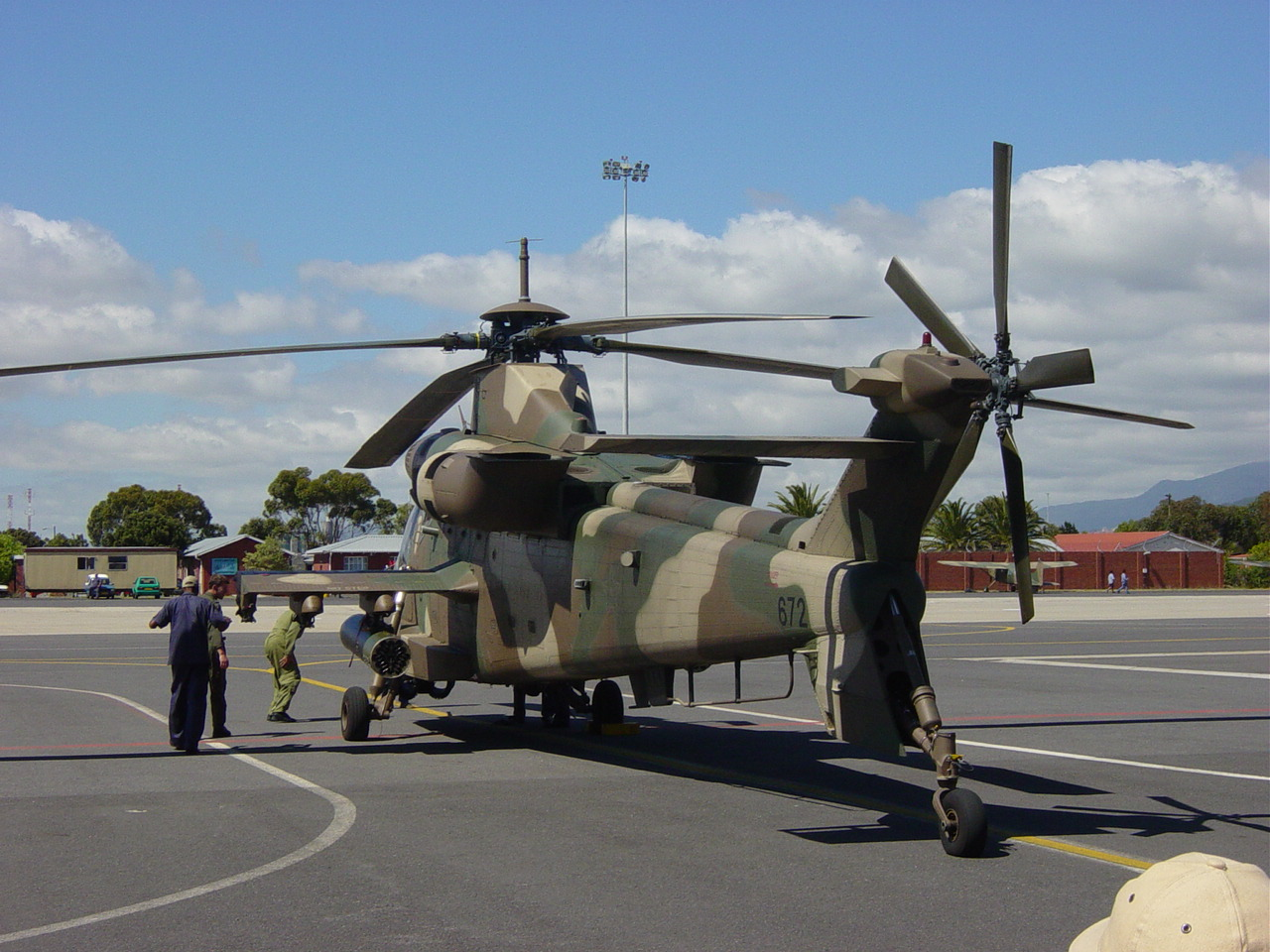
A Rooivalk at AFB Ysterplaat in Cape Town, South Africa

Due to the SAAF's decades of helicopter experience in the harsh African environment, the Rooivalk has been designed to operate for prolonged periods without sophisticated support. All that is needed to keep the Rooivalk flying is a medium transport helicopter equipped with a basic spares supply plus four groundcrew.

The Rooivalk carries a range of weapons depending on the mission profile. It is generally fitted with a nose-mounted 20 mm cannon and can also carry air-to-air missiles, anti-armour missiles and unguided rockets. The Rooivalk has a fire control system for target acquisition and tracking as well as an advanced navigation system using Doppler radar and GPS. Also incorporated is an electronic countermeasures suite coupled with chaff and flare dispensers. The Rooivalk has a nose-mounted gyro-stabilised sensor turret housing with auto-tracking. The Rooivalk uses a Thales TopOwl helmet mounted display (also used by several other attack and transport helicopters around the world). The system was developed by Société de Fabrication d’Instruments de Mesure (SFIM) in 1999/2000.

Notable features include a tandem cockpit, starboard tail rotor with a port tailplane, a fixed wheeled undercarriage as well as wire cutters above and below the cockpit and on the undercarriage. The Rooivalk is capable of doing a loop and thus momentarily "flying upside down".

The following types of missions are foreseen for the Rooivalk: reconnaissance, heliborne escort, close air support, deep penetration, and anti-armour.

== Operational service ==
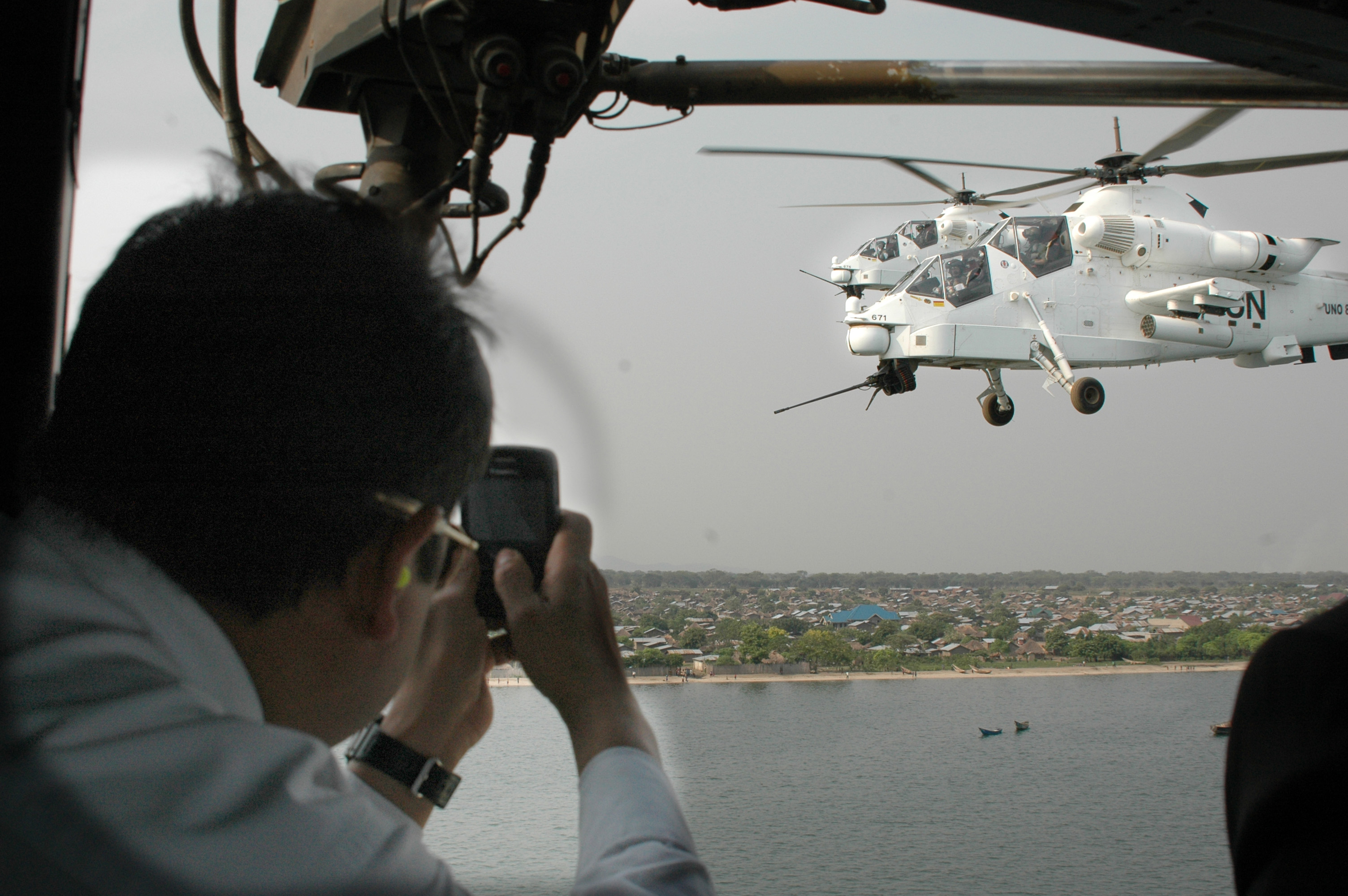
Two SAAF Rooivalk attack helicopters serving as part of the United Nations Force Intervention Brigade escorting a UN delegation in the Democratic Republic of the Congo.

By April 2005, only six of the 12 aircraft were available for operational test and evaluation with the others in need of software upgrades. The Chief of the South African Air Force, Lt. Gen. Carlo Gagiano, hoped that the helicopters would be ready around June 2007, indicating the "extremely worrying factor of time that the project was taking to reach maturity", attributing the delays to the exodus of personnel from Denel as well as its financial problems. This has forced the SAAF to assess alternative defence development partners.

One airframe was damaged beyond repair on 3 August 2005 after an "uncontrolled landing".

On 17 May 2007, Denel group CEO Shaun Liebenberg announced a decision to cease further development and funding for the Rooivalk as an export product following its failure to win the Turkish attack helicopter tender against the Agusta A129 Mangusta.

During November 2007, Defence Minister Mosiuoa Lekota announced in Parliament, that the SAAF was to invest R962 million (about US$137 million in 2007 exchange rates) in the helicopter over three years to 2010/2011, in order to bring it up to full operational status. The helicopter was expected to be deployed on peace-keeping duties as soon as initial operating capability is achieved.

On 1 April 2011, the SAAF received the first five of eleven (one of the twelve aircraft originally delivered to the SAAF was written off after an accident) Block 1F upgraded Rooivalk. The upgrade involves improved targeting systems and other avionics which enable the helicopter to use guided missiles for the first time. The Mokopa ATGM was qualified as part of the upgrade process. Gearbox components were improved and cooling problems with the F2 20 mm cannon were also addressed. The ninth and tenth Rooivalk attack helicopters were delivered in September 2012 following their upgrade to the Block 1F initial operating standard. The eleventh and final Rooivalk was delivered on 13 March 2013.

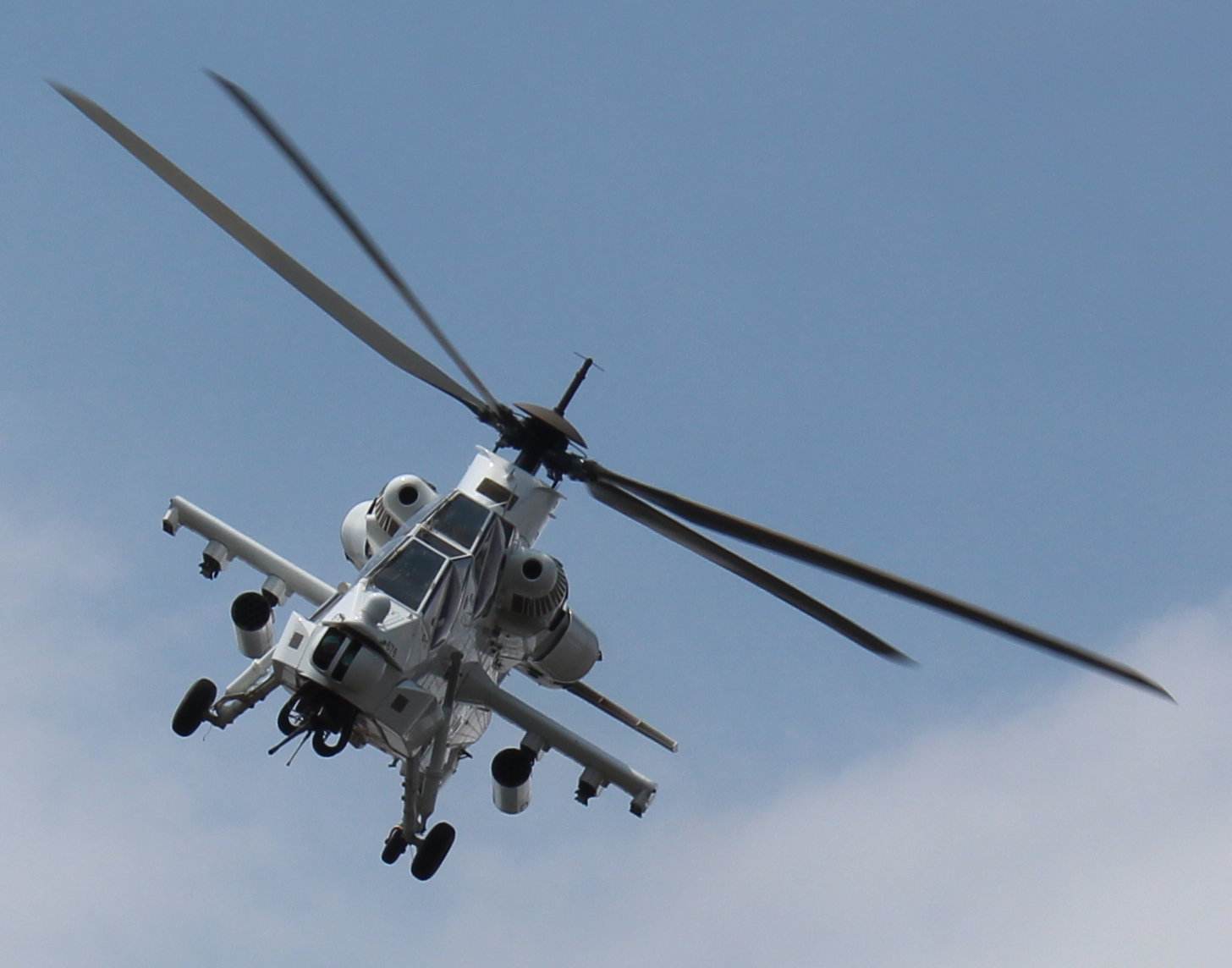
South African Rooivalk attack helicopter over FIB base in Sake, 2014

Three Rooivalk attack helicopters have been deployed with the United Nations Force Intervention Brigade to support the United Nations Organization Stabilization Mission in the Democratic Republic of the Congo in 2013.

On 4 November 2013, two Rooivalks with the United Nations Force Intervention Brigade fired FZ 90 70mm FFAR rockets on M23 positions near Chanzu in the Democratic Republic of the Congo.

== Operators ==
South Africa

- South African Air Force
  - 16 Squadron

== Aircraft on display ==
The first prototype Rooivalk XDM, SAAF serial 683, is on static display at the South African Air Force Museum, Swartkop Air Force Base, Pretoria.

== Specifications ==
Data from Jane's All The World's Aircraft, 2003–2004

General characteristics

- Crew: 2 (pilot & weapon systems officer)
- Length: 18.73 m (61 ft 5 in) overall

16.39 m (54 ft) fuselage only

- Height: 5.19 m (17 ft 0 in)
- Empty weight: 5,730 kg (12,632 lb)
- Gross weight: 7,500 kg (16,535 lb)
- Max takeoff weight: 8,750 kg (19,290 lb)
- Fuel capacity: 1,854 L (490 US gal; 408 imp gal)
- Powerplant: 2 × Turbomeca Makila 1K2 turboshaft engines, 1,420 kW (1,900 hp) each
- Main rotor diameter: × 15.58 m (51 ft 1 in)
- Main rotor area: 190.6 m^{2} (2,052 sq ft)
- Blade section: NACA 0015

Performance

- Cruise speed: 278 km/h (173 mph, 150 kn) at sea level (max cruise)
- Never exceed speed: 309 km/h (192 mph, 167 kn)
- Range: 740 km (460 mi, 400 nmi) at sea level (max cruise)
- Ferry range: 720 km (450 mi, 390 nmi) at 1,525 m (5,003 ft) (max external fuel)
- Service ceiling: 6,100 m (20,000 ft)
- Rate of climb: 13.3 m/s (2,620 ft/min)

Armament

- 1 × F2 20 mm cannon, 700 rounds
- 8 or 16 × Mokopa ZT-6 long-range anti-tank guided missiles (ATGM)
- 4 × MBDA Mistral air-to-air missiles
- 38 or 76 × 70 mm rockets folding fin aerial rockets (FFAR) or Wrap-Around (WA) (FZ90 70mm WA)
- FZ275 LGR Laser Guided Rocket

== Family tree ==
  - SA330 Puma – (France)
    - Atlas Oryx – (South Africa)
      - Denel Rooivalk – (South Africa)
    - IAR 330 – (Romania)
    - IPTN NAS 330J (Indonesia)
    - Westland Puma HC.1 (United Kingdom)
  - Eurocopter AS332 Super Puma – (France) (H215 Super Puma)
    - Eurocopter AS532 Cougar – (France) (H215M Caracal)
    - KAI KUH-1 Surion – (South Korea)
  - Eurocopter EC725 – (France) (H225M Caracal)
    - Eurocopter EC225 Super Puma – (France) (EC225 Super Puma Mk2)

== See also ==
Related development

- Atlas Oryx
- Atlas XH-1 Alpha

Aircraft of comparable role, configuration, and era

- Agusta A129 Mangusta
- AgustaWestland Apache
- Bell AH-1Z Viper
- Boeing AH-64 Apache
- CAIC Z-10
- Eurocopter Tiger
- HAL Prachand
- Harbin Z-19
- IAIO Toufan
- Kamov Ka-50
- Kawasaki OH-1
- Mil Mi-24
- Mil Mi-28
- Panha 2091
- TAI/AgustaWestland T129 ATAK

Related lists

- List of attack aircraft
- List of rotorcraft
