= Atlas XH-1 Alpha =

Prototype attack helicopter

XH-1 Alpha
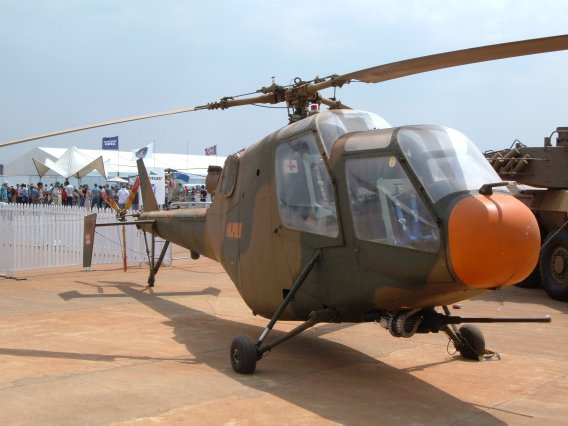
- Alpha XH-1

General information
- Type: Prototype
- Manufacturer: Atlas Aviation; Denel
- Status: Retired
- Number built: 1

History
- First flight: 3 February 1985
- Developed from: Aérospatiale Alouette III

The Atlas XH-1 Alpha is a prototype attack helicopter built by Atlas Aviation (now Denel) of South Africa, which used it as a concept demonstrator for the then-planned Rooivalk project.

== Development ==
It was developed from an Aérospatiale Alouette III airframe, retaining that helicopter's engine and dynamic components, but replacing the original cockpit with a stepped tandem one, adding a 20 mm cannon under the chin and converting the undercarriage to tail-dragger configuration.

The XH-1 first flew on 3 February 1985, and soon embarked on a rigorous flight test program to examine the feasibility of a dedicated attack helicopter in southern African conditions. The results were ultimately good enough to convince Atlas and the South African Air Force to go ahead with the development of a dedicated attack helicopter, the Denel Rooivalk.

The XH-1 and Rooivalk are completely different aircraft and share no components. The Rooivalk was developed from the later XH-2 prototype.

The sole XH-1 was retired sometime in the late 1980s and was handed over to the South African Air Force Museum, where it remains to this day.

== Specifications (XH-1) ==
General characteristics

- Crew: 2
- Length: 10.56 m (34 ft 8 in)
- Height: 2.73 m (8 ft 11 in)
- Empty weight: 1,400 kg (3,086 lb)
- Max takeoff weight: 2,200 kg (4,850 lb)
- Powerplant: 1 × Turbomeca Artouste IIIB turboshaft, 410 kW (550 hp)
- Main rotor diameter: 11.02 m (36 ft 2 in)
- Main rotor area: 95.4 m^{2} (1,027 sq ft)

Performance

- Maximum speed: 210 km/h (130 mph, 110 kn)
- Cruise speed: 185 km/h (115 mph, 100 kn)
- Combat range: 275 km (171 mi, 148 nmi)
- Rate of climb: 4.1 m/s (800 ft/min)

Armament

- Guns: 1 × Vektor GA-1 Rattler 20mm cannon in a chin turret with 1,000 rounds

== See also ==
Related development

- Aérospatiale Alouette III
- Denel Rooivalk

Aircraft of comparable role, configuration, and era

- Bell 207 Sioux Scout
- Cicaré CH-14 Aguilucho
- IAR 317 Airfox
- HESA Shahed 285

Related lists

- List of attack aircraft
- List of rotorcraft
