= History of the South African Air Force =

The History of the South African Air Force spans the First World War, Rand Rebellion of 1922, the Second World War, the Korean War, the South African Border War, and varied peacekeeping operations since 1994. Its battle honours include German South West Africa 1914–15, German East Africa 1915–1918, East Africa: 1939–1941, Middle East: 1941–43, Madagascar 1942, Italy 1943–1945, the Balkans 1943–1945, and Korea 1950–1953.

== Origins and first flying school ==
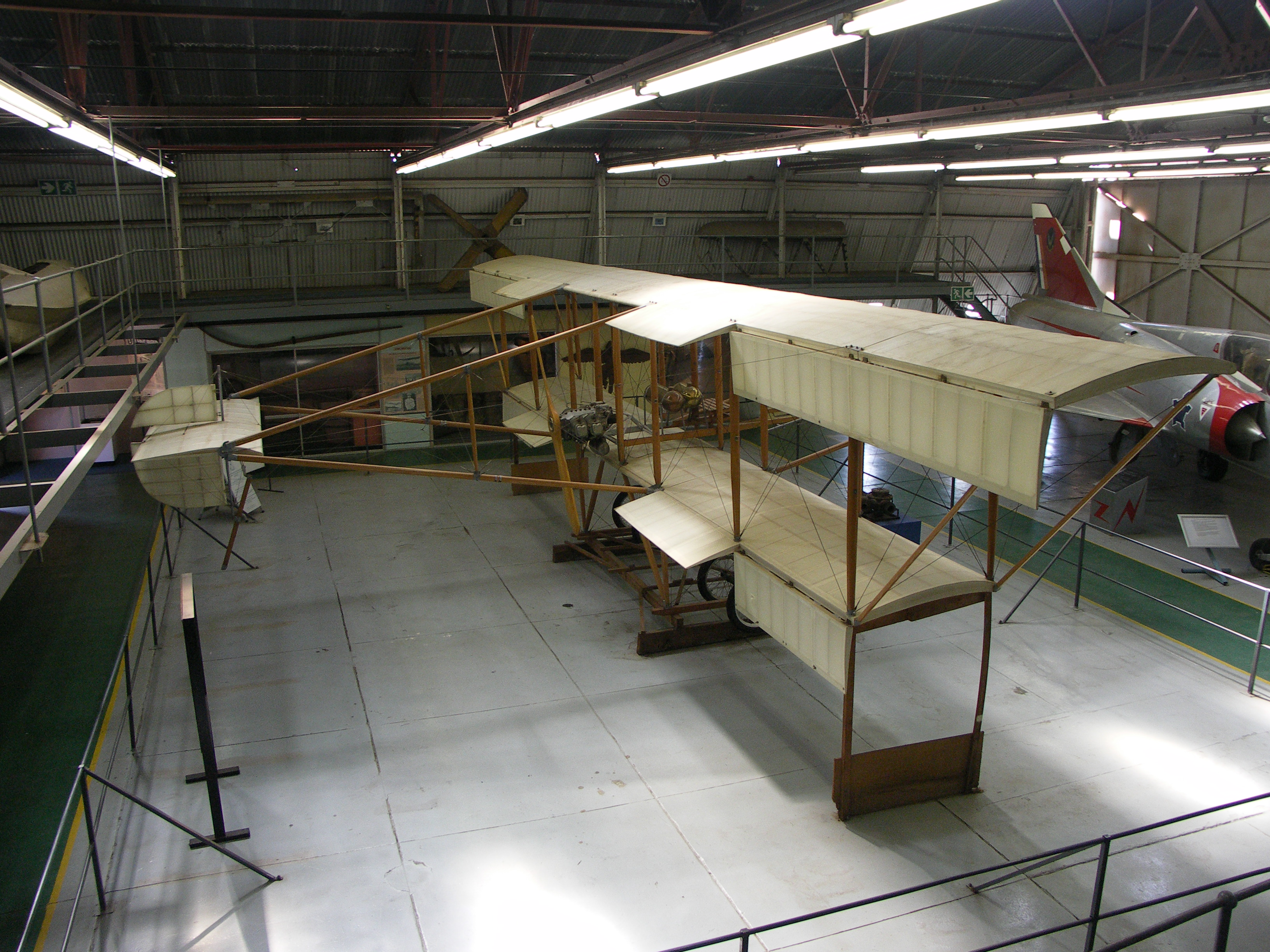
Replica of the Patterson No. 2 Biplane at the South African Air Force Museum

The first winged flight in South Africa is thought to have been made around 1875 by John Goodman Household in a primitive glider in the Karkloof district of Natal. The first powered flight is attributed to the French aviator Albert Kimmerling on 28 December 1909 at East London flying a Voisin 1907 biplane. In June 1911 the South African John Weston flew a Weston-Farman for 8.5 minutes, a South African record time for a sustained flight. Demonstrations by Weston followed well into 1912 and at a large number of locations. In December 1911 two visiting aviators, Cecil Compton Patterson flying a Patterson No. 2 Biplane and Evelyn Driver flying a Bleriot biplane, started flying demonstration flights in the Cape and aroused significant public and government interest to the possibilities of powered flight in South Africa. Prompted by the Patterson / Driver displays, General Jan Smuts (Minister of Defence) sent Brig Gen C.F. Beyers (Commandant-General of the Citizen Force) to Britain to observe the 1912 military manoeuvres in Switzerland, Germany, France and England and to report on the viability of using aircraft in military operations. Beyers' response was extremely supportive and encouraging of the establishment of an air corps, particularly for the purpose of aerial scouting. By this time the Patterson / Driver flying syndicate had dissolved and in 1912 Patterson and the Union Defence Force reached an agreement to establish a flying school at Alexandersfontein in Kimberley, known as Paterson's Aviation Syndicate School of Flying to train pilots for the proposed South African Aviation Corps (SAAC). Basic flying training commenced in 1913 with ten students, using a Compton-Paterson biplane and six of the students who completed the basic training were sent to the Central Flying School at RAF Upavon in Great Britain for further training. Lt. Kenneth van der Spuy passed his final examination on 2 June 1914 and was granted the certificate of the Royal Aero Club, becoming South Africa's first qualified military pilot. The others passed a few days later, with five of them eventually qualifying. (Note: Gerard Wallace, Gordon Creed, Edwin Emmett, Basil Turner and Kennith van der Spey.) On qualifying, the Union Defence Force granted permission for these aviators to be seconded to the Royal Flying Corps (RFC).

== World War I ==
=== German South West Africa ===
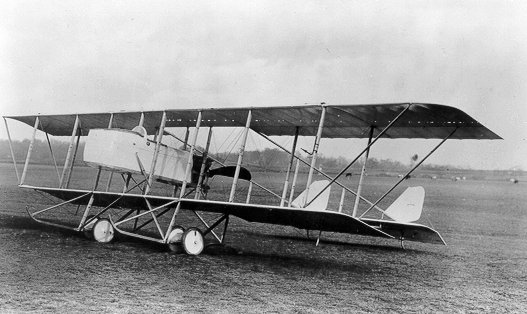
Farman aircraft purchased from France in 1914

World War I broke out in August 1914, and one month later South African troops invaded German West Africa. Early in the German West African campaign, the Union Defence Force had realised the need for air support – having frequently seen German reconnaissance aircraft above their advancing columns and later, having been strafed by German aircraft. This emphasised the urgency for the need of the long-discussed air corps and brought about the establishment of the South African Aviation Corps (SAAC) on 29 January 1915. Although the SAAC had been formally established, the lack of aircraft led Sir Abe Bailey to lead a delegation in an attempt to acquire American aircraft and pilots for the air corps. The Wright double-wing aircraft initially earmarked for purchase were found to be unsuitable after having been tested in Britain; British aircraft too (being of wooden construction), were considered unsuitable for the hot and dry conditions of German West Africa. It was finally decided to purchase twelve tubular steel framed French Henri Farman F-27 aircraft, powered by Canton-Unné radial engines. Capt. Wallace was recalled from the RFC and oversaw the purchase of the aircraft in France, while Lieutenants Turner and Emmett were recalled to co-ordinate the building of an airfield at Walvis Bay and to prepare for the recruitment of 75 prospective pilots.

Due to a lack of steel tube in France, delivery of the Henri Farmans was delayed and the British government offered four B.E.2c's as interim aircraft and also provided three RFC pilots. Eventually, only two B.E.2c's and six Henri Farmans were delivered, with the last aircraft arriving in the Union on 15 May 1915. In addition, the SAAC received two Jeannin Taube monoplanes which had been captured while en route to German West Africa by British Forces in Douala. Although not air-worthy, these two aircraft were pressed into SAAC service for ground training at the Cape Town Drill Hall soon after their arrival in February 1915.

By June 1915 the SAAC commanded by Major Gerard Wallace, was deployed to its first operational airfield at Karabib in German West Africa. Operations were in support of Gen. Botha's South African ground forces, flying reconnaissance and leaflet dropping missions from Karbib and later from Omaruru, where improvised bombing missions were added when pilots started dropping hand grenades and rudimentary bombs by hand. On 9 July 1915, the German forces capitulated and most of the pilots and aircraft of the SAAC were sent to Britain in support of the Commonwealth war effort.

=== German East Africa ===
Although the SAAC remained active, its activities were limited to ground training at the Cape Town Drill Hall using the two Jeannin Taubes and two damaged (and now no longer air-worthy) B.E.2c's, while the pilots who had been detached to the RFC were grouped to form No. 26 Squadron RFC at Netharavon, becoming an independent squadron on 8 October 1915. No. 26 Squadron was equipped with the ex-SAAC Henri Farman F-27's used in German West Africa and B.E.2c's from the RFC. Shortly after becoming operational, the squadron was shipped to Kenya in support of the war effort in German East Africa, landing in Mombasa on 31 January 1916. The eight aircraft had been shipped in wooden crates and were re-assembled in Mombasa and then flown to a forward airfield prepared inside German East Africa at Mbuyuni, with the South African and British pilots of 26 Squadron (now known as "The South Africa Squadron") being billeted in tents close to their aircraft. The squadron flew reconnaissance and observer missions throughout the campaign until February 1918. The squadron was returned to the UK via Cape Town and arrived at Blandford Camp on 8 July 1918 and was disbanded the same day.

While the SAAC were engaged in German South West Africa and 26 Sqn RFC in East Africa, many South Africans travelled to the United Kingdom to enlist with the Royal Flying Corps. The number of South Africans in the RFC eventually reached approximately 3,000 men and suffered 260 active-duty fatalities. South African airmen took part in aerial reconnaissance and artillery spotting missions over the Somme during the war. Forty six pilots became fighter aces shooting down five or more enemy aircraft, with the most successful, Andrew Beauchamp-Proctor being the British Empire's fourth most successful ace with 54 victories.

=== War in Europe ===
A number of South Africans took part in the civil war in Eastern Europe between 1917 and 1920. The North Russian Expeditionary Force had a Royal Flying Corps and Royal Naval Air Service detachment which landed in Murmansk in June 1918 and a second expeditionary force with further air assets arrived in 1919. A Sopwith Camel equipped flight of No. 47 Squadron RAF was commanded by South African Capt. Sam Kinkead and a number of South African pilots flew with the squadron, amongst them Kennith van der Spuy who was to become Director-General of Technical Services in the Union Defence Forces from 1940 to 1945 as well as Pierre van Ryneveld who was to become the Chief of Staff of the Union Defence Force during the Second World War.

== Inter-war period ==
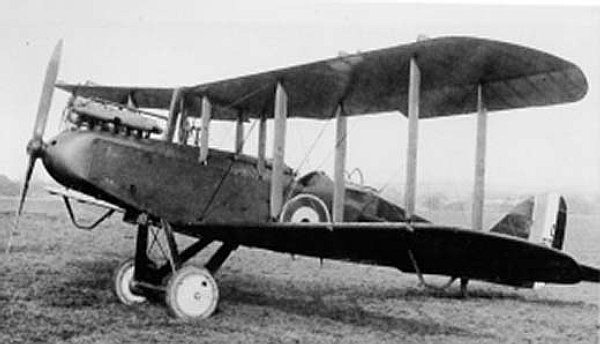
De Havilland/Airco DH.9: 49 of these aircraft were donated to South Africa as part of the Imperial Gift

On conclusion of the First World War, the British Government donated surplus aircraft plus spares and sufficient equipment to provide the nucleus of a fledgling air force to each of its Dominions. As part of this donation, which was to become known as the Imperial Gift, South Africa received a total of 113 aircraft from both the British Government (100 aircraft) as well as from other sources (13 aircraft) (Note: 30x Avro 504K's; 22x Royal Aircraft Factory S.E.5a's; 49x De Havilland DH.9's (one of which was donated by the City of Birmingham); 10x De Havilland DH.4's (donated by the Overseas Club of London); 2x Royal Aircraft Factory B.E.2e's (donated by Maj. Miller Tour)) The first batch of aircraft were delivered to the Aircraft and Artillery Depot at Roberts Heights in Pretoria in September 1919 and on 1 February 1920 the South African Air Force was established with Col. Pierre van Ryneveld as the Director Air Services.

The trial roundel used between December 1920 and December 1921.

Not all of the aircraft which had been received were assembled immediately and two of the Avro 504K's were sold to the South African Aerial Transport Company. The assembled aircraft were moved to a site at Swartkop, three kilometres east of what was then Roberts Heights which had been converted from a farm to the first air force aerodrome. No. 1 Flight was established on 26 April 1921, commanded by Lt. J. Holthouse and was joined by a second flight in 1922 with these two flights forming 1 Squadron, the first South African Air Force squadron, equipped with 3 DH.9's, 2 Avro 504's and one SE.5a.

In December 1920 the South African National insignia was added to aircraft for the first time. An Orange, Green, Red and Blue roundel was added to an Avro 504K for trial purposes but the colours were found to be unsuitable and were replaced with a Green, Red, Lemon, Yellow and Blue roundel in December 1921. These colours remained until 1927 when they were replaced with the Orange, White and Blue roundels.

The first operational deployment of the newly formed Air Force was to quell internal dissent, when in 1922 a miner's strike on the Johannesburg gold mines turned violent and led to the declaration of martial law. 1 Squadron was called to fly reconnaissance missions and to bombard the strikers' positions. Sorties in support of the police amounted to 127 flight hours between 10 and 15 March and this inauspicious start for the SAAF led to two pilot losses, two wounded and two aircraft lost to ground fire. The SAAF was again deployed to suppress the Bondelzwart Rebellion at Kalkfontein between 29 May and 3 July 1922.

The Great Depression of 1929–1933 had led to forced reductions in defence spending and the South African military had received minimal funding, leading to a reduction in staff, facilities and resources. Economic recovery became visible in 1933 and led to an increase in the demand for gold resulting in significant growth for the Union economy. In 1934 a five-year expansion plan was announced whereby the Union Defence Forces (UDF) were to receive increased funding and were to be markedly expanded.

== World War II ==
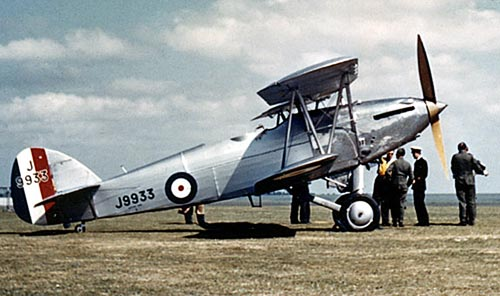
The Hawker Hartbeest: one of the most common early World War II fighter aircraft of the SAAF

When war broke out on 3 September 1939, the SAAF was ill-prepared, not only for the defence of the Union but also lacking in any capability to provide any tangible support to the Commonwealth. The 1934 Five Year Plan for expansion had not materialised and the SAAF still consisted of only 160 permanent force officers, 35 cadets and 1,400 other ranks organised into one operational and two training squadrons, as well as five shadow squadrons that existed only on paper. The training schemes implemented since 1934 had focused on volume and although over 1,000 pilots had been trained – these pilots could fly, but were not competent as combat pilots. Also, no air observers had yet been trained. The 104 aircraft air fleet was considered obsolete with the front-line operational aircraft consisting of four Hurricanes Mkl's, one Blenheim bomber and one Fairey Battle. Fortunately, there was no enemy activity in the region in the initial period of the war, permitting time to expand and re-structure the SAAF.

Urgent remedial measures were implemented; The lack of combat ready pilots was greatly alleviated by the establishment of the Joint Air Training Scheme (JATS) to train Royal Air Force (RAF), SAAF and other allied air and ground crews at 38 newly created South African air schools. Resources were increased and by September 1941 the SAAF had a personnel strength of 31 204, of whom 956 were pilots, 715 observers and air-gunners, 2 943 basic trainees and 4 321 members of the Women's Auxiliary Air Force. Urgent aircraft procurement programs resulted in the total number of military aircraft in the Union being increased to 1 709 aircraft (South African based aircraft, excluding those deployed in the different operational areas).

=== Coastal defence ===
At the outbreak of war, South Africa had no naval vessels and the UDF's first priority was to ensure the safety of the South African coastal waters as well as the strategically important Cape sea-route. To provide credible maritime patrol operations, the SAAF took over all 29 of South African Airways' passenger aircraft: eighteen Junkers JU-86Z-l's to be used in the maritime patrol role and eleven Junkers Ju 52's for transport purposes. SAAF maritime patrols commenced on 21 September 1939 with 16 Squadron flying three JU-86Z's from Walvis Bay. By 1940, the JU-86s were replaced by Anson's and Coastal Command SAAF had been established, eventually consisting of 6, 10, 22, 23, 25, 27 and 29 Squadrons.

By the end of World War II, SAAF aircraft in conjunction with British and Dutch aircraft stationed in South Africa, had intercepted seventeen enemy ships, assisted in the rescue of 437 survivors of sunken ships and attacked 26 of the 36 enemy submarines that operated around the South African coast and had flown 15,000 coastal patrol sorties by August 1945.

=== East Africa ===
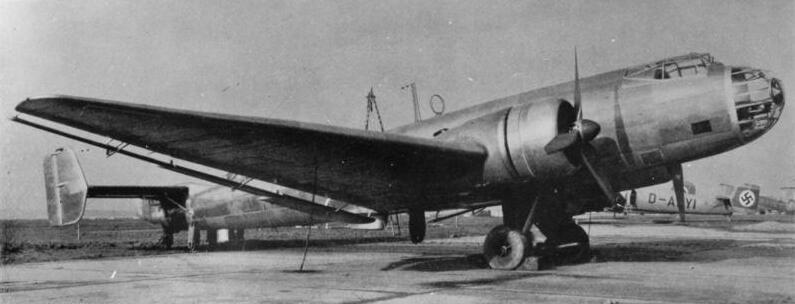
Ju86 similar to that flown by the SAAF in a bomber role in East Africa

In December 1939 the Duke of Aosta had sent a report to Mussolini recording the state of chronic unpreparedness of the Allied Forces in East Africa. The collapse of France in 1940 had prompted Mussolini to join the war on the side of the Axis and as a result, air force elements were moved to forward positions in occupied Abyssinia to mount air attacks on Allied forces before they could be re-enforced. These deployments prompted Allied action and on 13 May 1940, 1 Squadron pilots were sent to Cairo to take delivery of 18 Gloster Gladiators and to fly them south, to Kenya for operations in East Africa. 11 Squadron equipped with Hawker Hartbees followed to Nairobi on 19 May 1940 and were joined by the Ju86's of 12 Squadron on 22 May 1940. Italy declared war on 10 June 1940 and on the following day, the Ju86's of 12 Squadron lead the first air attack by the SAAF in World War II. During the campaign, numerous SAAF aircraft were involved in air combat with the Italian Regia Aeronautica and provided air support to South African and Allied forces in the ground war. By December 1940, ten SAAF squadrons plus 34 Flight, with a total of 94 aircraft were operational in East Africa (1, 2, 3, 11, 12, 14, 40, 41, 50 and 60 Sqn's).

During this campaign the SAAF formed a Close Support Flight consisting of four Gladiators and four Hartbees with an autonomous air force commander operating with the land forces. This was the precursor of the Tactical Air Force "cab-rank" technique which were used extensively for close air support during 1943–1945. The last air combat took place on 29 October and the Italian forces surrendered on 27 November 1940 after which a reduced SAAF presence was maintained in East Africa for coastal patrol purposes until May 1943.

=== Western Desert and North Africa ===
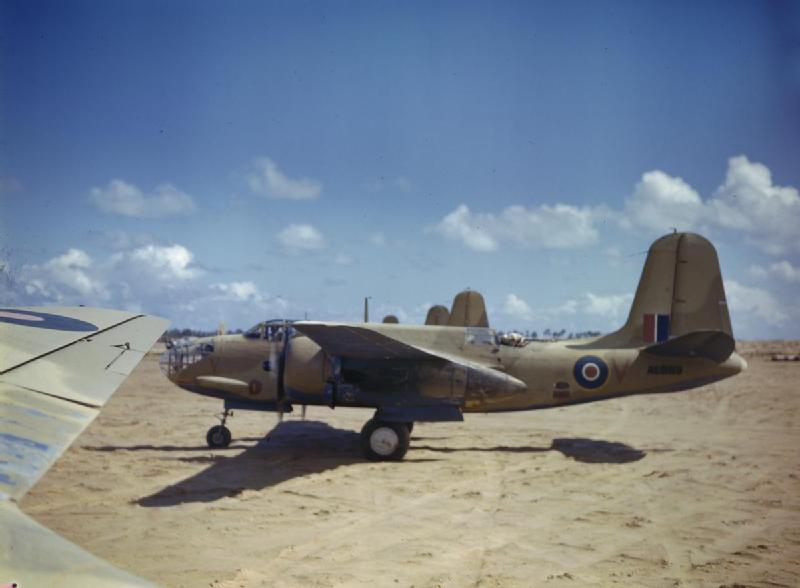
Douglas Boston of 24 Squadron SAAF at Zuara, Tripolitania, Libya, 1943

The SAAF fighter, bomber and reconnaissance squadrons played a key role in the Western Desert and North African campaigns from 1941 to 1943. A memorable feat was the SAAF Boston bombers of 12 and 24 Squadrons who dropped hundreds of tons of bombs on the Afrika Korps as it was pushing the Eighth Army back towards Egypt during the "Gazala Gallop" in early 1942. The SAAF bombers were also instrumental in continually harassing the German forces retreating towards the Tunisian border after the Battle of Alamein whilst the South African fighters of 223 Wing contributed towards the Allied Desert Air Force attaining air superiority over the Axis air forces by the beginning of 1942. Between April 1941 and May 1943, the eleven SAAF squadrons (Note: SAAF elements in the Western Desert Air Force as at 26 May 1942: (A.) Assigned to air HQ: (A.1.) 15 Sqn: Fighter/Recon (Amiriya with one detachment at Kufra), Blenheim IVF. (A.2.) 40 Sqn: Recon (El Adem), Hurricane I / Tomahawk. (A.3.) 60 Sqn: Recon (Sidi Barrani) Marylands. (B.) 3 Wing SAAF (Baheira): (B.1.) 12 Sqn: Light Bomber (Baheira), Boston III's; (B.2.) 24 Sqn: Light Bomber (Baheira), Baltimore I; (B.3.) No. 223 RAF Light Bomber (Baheira) Baltimore I. (C.) No. 223 Wing RAF (Gambut). (C.1.) 4 Sqn: Fighter (Gambut), Tomahawks. (C.2.) 5 Sqn: Fighter (Gambut), Tomahawks. (C.3.) 2 Sqn: Fighter (Gambut), Kittyhawk I.) flew 33 991 sorties and destroyed 342 enemy aircraft.

Conditions were however not ideal and pilots and crew were required to operate under critical conditions at times. Pilots were frequently sent home to the Union after gaining experience and did not return for many months, after which conditions in the desert had changed significantly and they were required to regain experience on different aircraft, different tactics and operations from different bases. There were cases where experienced fighter pilots were sent back to the Western Desert as bomber pilots for their second tour – compounding the lack of continuity and experience. The South Africans did however command the respect of their German adversaries: "I personally had a firm conviction that the Australian squadrons fought less stubbornly than the English and the South Africans. Of the French we heard only rumours, and of the Poles – I believe that our aversion was reciprocal." Rudolf Sinner, II/JG27, 1942.

The South Africans had the distinction of dropping the first and last bombs in the African conflict – the first being on 11 June 1940 on Moyale in Abyssinia and the last being on the Italian 1st Army in Tunisia. The SAAF also produced a number of SAAF WWII air aces in the process, including John Frost, Sailor Malan, Gerald Stapleton and Marmaduke Pattle.

=== Madagascar ===
In fear of Japanese occupation and subsequent operations in the Indian Ocean in close proximity to South African sea lanes, Field-Marshal Smuts encouraged the preemptive Allied occupation of the island of Madagascar. After much debate and further encouragement by General de Gaulle (who was urging for a Free French operation against Madagascar), Churchill and the Chiefs of Staff agreed to an invasion by means of a strong fleet and adequate air support. In March and April 1942, the SAAF had been conducting reconnaissance flights over Diego Suarez and 32, 36 and 37 Coastal Flights (Note: These three Maritime Reconnaissance Flights were later combined to form 16 Squadron: 32 Flight consisting of 5 Glen Martin Maryland Bombers (Maj D Meaker, Officer Commanding); 36 Flight with 6 Bristol Beaufort Bombers (Maj J Clayton, Officer Commanding); 37 Flight with 1 Maryland and 5 Beauforts (Maj K Jones, Officer Commanding)) were withdrawn from South African maritime patrol operations and sent to Lindi on the Indian Ocean coast of Tanzania, with an additional eleven Beauforts and six Marylands to provide ongoing reconnaissance and close air support for the planned operation – to be known as Operation Ironclad.

During the amphibious / air assault carried out by the Royal Navy and Air Force on 5 May, the Vichy French Air Force consisting mainly of Morane fighters and Potez bombers had attacked the Allied fleet but had been neutralised by the Fleet Air Arm aircraft from the two aircraft carriers. Those remaining aircraft not destroyed were withdrawn by the French and flown south to other airfields on the island. Once the main airfield at Arrachart aerodrome in Diego Suarez had been secured (13 May 1942), the SAAF Air Component flew from Lindi to Arrachart. The air component consisted of thirty-four aircraft (6 Marylands, 11 Beaufort Bombers, 12 Lockheed Lodestars and 6 Ju 52's transports). By September 1942, the South African ground forces committed to Ironclad had been party to the capturing the southern half of Madagascar as well as the small island of Nossi Be with the SAAF air component supporting these operations. During the campaign which ended with an armistice on 4 November 1942, SAAF aircraft flew a total of 401 sorties with one pilot killed in action, one killed in an accident and one succumbing to disease. Seven aircraft were lost, only one as a result of enemy action.

=== Sicilian and Italian campaigns ===
By the end of May 1943, the SAAF had two Wings and sixteen squadrons in the Middle East and North Africa with 8,000 men. With the end of the North African campaign, the SAAF role underwent change – becoming more active in fighter bomber, bomber and PR operations as opposed to the fighter role performed in the desert.

Five SAAF squadrons were designated to support the July 1943 invasion of Sicily – 1 Squadron operated combat air patrols over the beaches for the Operation Husky landings while 2, 4 and 5 Squadrons provided fighter bomber support during the Sicilian campaign. 30 Squadron (flying as No. 223 Squadron RAF during the campaign) provided light bomber support from Malta and 60 Squadron was responsible for photo reconnaissance flights in support of all Allied forces on the island. After successfully invading the island, a further three squadrons were moved to Sicily and the eight squadrons on the island were tasked with supporting the invasion of Italy: 12 and 24 Squadrons were responsible for medium bomber missions to "soften up" the enemy prior to the invasion while 40 Sqn was responsible for tactical photo-reconnaissance. 1 Squadron provided fighter cover for the 3 September 1943 landings while 2 and 4 Squadrons were responsible for bomber escort.

=== Other theatres ===
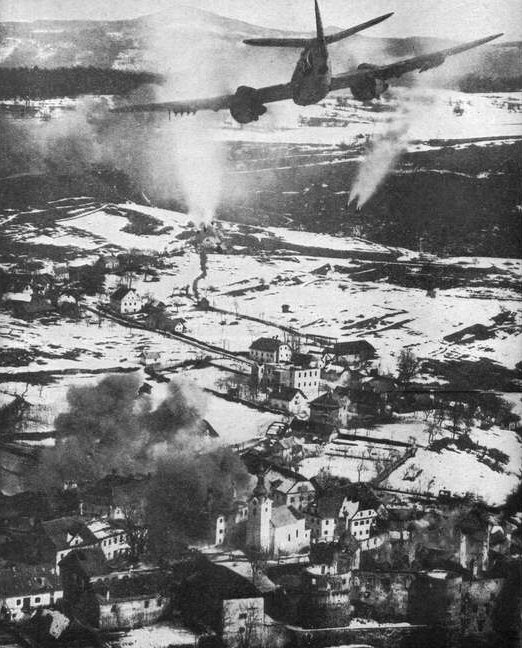
SAAF Beaufighters of 19 Sqn (Balkan Air Force) attacking German-occupied buildings in Zuzemberk, Yugoslavia in Spring 1945

- Atlantic (1943–45): Two squadrons patrolled convoy routes off West Africa and Gibraltar. (26 Squadron SAAF, Vickers Wellington XI's, Takoradi, Gold Coast, West Africa)
- Yugoslavia (1943–44): 7 Wing supported partisan operations against German occupation forces.
- Balkans (1944–45): Some squadrons served with the Balkan Air Force in operations over Hungary, Romania and Albania.
- Warsaw (1944): 2 Wing air-supplied Warsaw during Warsaw Uprising.
- Greece (1944): 2 Wing supported British operations to liberate Greece and suppress the communist coup.
- France (1944): A detachment took part in the Franco-American invasion of southern France.
- Strategic and tactical reconnaissance in Mediterranean theatre

=== Commonwealth Joint Air Training Scheme ===
The Joint Air Training Scheme was a major programme for training South African Air Force, Royal Air Force and Allied air crews during World War II. An Elementary Flying Training School (EFTS) gave a recruit 50 hours of basic aviation instruction on simple trainer aircraft and pilots who showed further promise went on to training at a Service Flying Training School (STFS). The Service Flying Training School provided advanced training for pilots, including fighter and multi-engined aircraft while other trainees went on to different specialties, such as wireless, navigation or bombing and gunnery training. In South Africa, the Elementary Flying Training School and Service Flying Training School curricula were grouped together and known as Training Air Schools. Thirty-five such air schools were established in South Africa for Commonwealth pilot and crew training. The facilities were under SAAF control and were distributed throughout the country with training being conducted using a wide variety of aircraft (depending on the purpose of the training). (Note: Elementary pilot training was conducted using Tiger Moths while Service Flying training was conducted using Hinds, Harts and Oxfords. Navigation, air Observer and bombing training was conducted using Oxfords, Ansons and Fairey Battles and Tiger Moth, Tutors for elementary navigation training. Electrical engineer and wireless operator training was done using Dominies and Ansons – while DH Dragons and Envoys were used for photographic reconnaissance training. Glider training was conducted using Grunau Babys, Slingsby Kirby Cadets and Minimoas.) The training scheme was in operation from 1939 to 1945.

== Berlin airlift ==
Although no SAAF aircraft participated in the 1948–1949 Berlin Airlift, the SAAF supplied 20 aircrews to support the effort. The air-crews flew to Britain via east Africa, Egypt and Malta and were assigned to fly RAF C-47 Dakotas as part of the Royal Air Force effort after receiving advanced training on the aircraft type at RAF Bassingbourne. They flew 1,240 missions and delivered 4,133 tons of supplies. The sorties were flown from Lübeck in West Germany into RAF Gatow in West Berlin. On return trips, the aircraft frequently carried civilians in need of evacuation from occupied Berlin, especially orphaned children who were placed with families in the West. The Soviet blockade of Berlin was lifted at midnight on 12 May 1949 but flights continued for some time after this date to stockpile additional supplies in Berlin. By 24 July 1949, a three-month surplus had been accumulated and the Airlift officially ended on 30 September 1949.

== Korean War ==
At the outbreak of the Korean War the United Nations Security Council passed a resolution calling for the withdrawal of the North Korean Forces. A request was also made to all UN members for assistance. After a special Cabinet meeting on 20 July 1950 the Union Government announced that due to the long distance between South Africa and Korea, direct ground-based military participation in the conflict was impractical and unrealistic but that a SAAF fighter squadron would be made available to the UN effort. The 50 officers and 157 other ranks of 2 Sqn SAAF sailed from Durban on 26 September 1950 – they had been selected from 1,426 members of the Permanent Force who had initially volunteered for service. This initial contingent was commanded by Cmdt S. van Breda Theron DSO, DFC, AFC and included many World War II SAAF veterans. The squadron was moved to Johnson Air Base near Tokyo on 25 September 1950 for conversion training on the F-51D Mustangs supplied by the US Air Force.

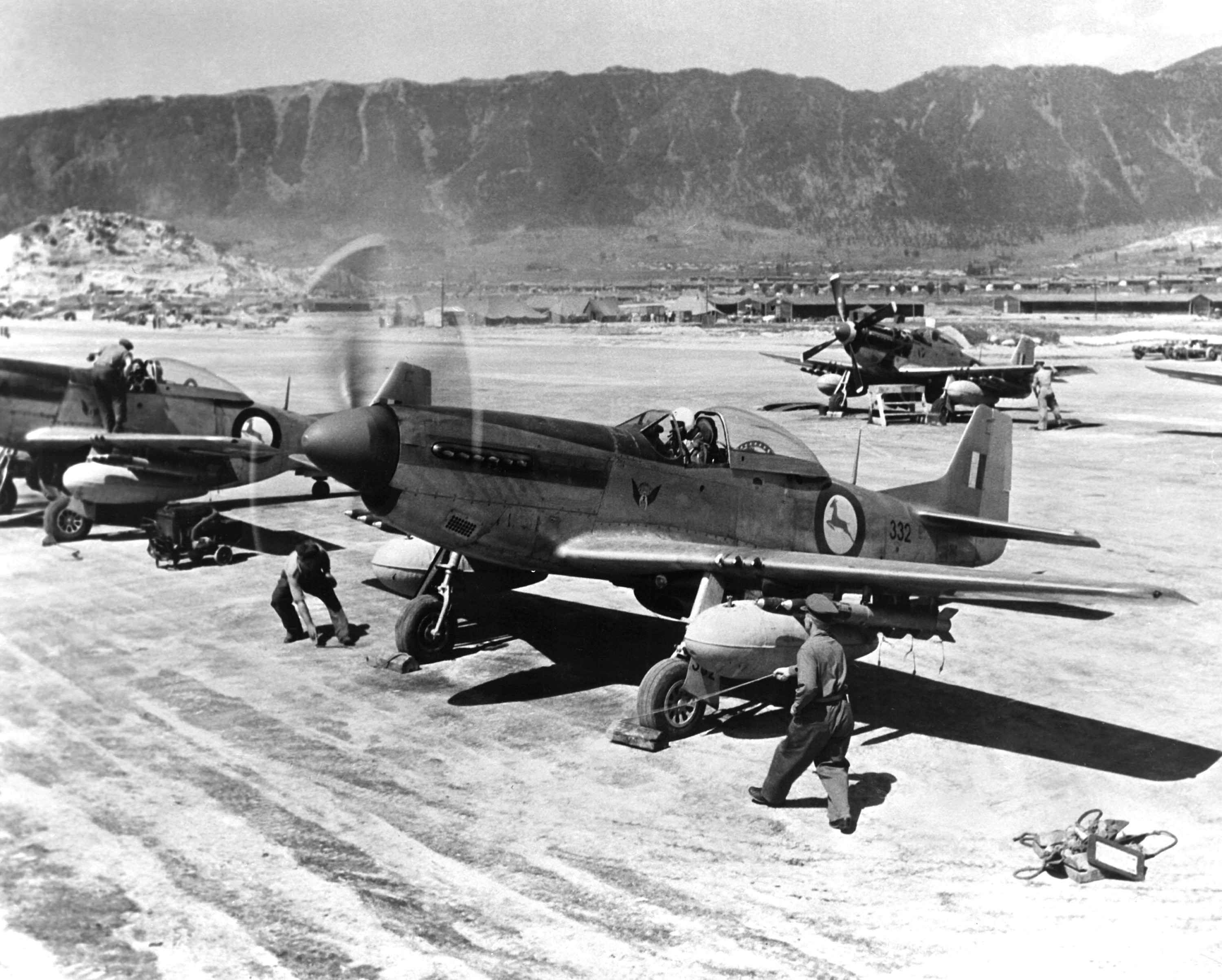
2 Squadron F51 Mustangs in Korea

On completion of conversion training, the squadron was deployed as one of the four USAF 18th Fighter-Bomber Wing squadrons and on 16 November 1950 an advance detachment consisting of 13 officers and 21 other ranks (including the Squadron Commander and his four Flight Commanders who made the crossing in their own F-51D Mustangs) left Japan for Pusan East (K-9) Air Base in Korea to fly with the USAF pilots in order to familiarize themselves with the local operational conditions. On the morning of 19 November 1950, Cmdt Theron and Capt G.B. Lipawsky took off with two USAF pilots to fly the first SAAF combat sorties of the Korean War from K-9 and K-24 airfields at Pyong Yang.

On 30 November the squadron was moved further south to K-13 airfield due to North Korean and Chinese advances. It was again moved even further south after the UN forces lost additional ground to the North Koreans to K-10 airfield situated on the coast close to the town of Chinhae within the Pusan Perimeter. This was to be the squadron's permanent base for the duration of their first Korean deployment. During this period (while equipped with F-51D Mustangs) the squadron flew 10,373 sorties and lost 74 aircraft out of the total 95 allocated. Twelve pilots were killed in action, 30 missing and four wounded.

In January 1953 the squadron returned to Japan for conversion to the USAF F-86F Sabre fighter-bombers. The first Sabre mission was flown on 16 March 1953 from the K-55 airfield in South Korea, being the first SAAF jet mission flown. The squadron was tasked with fighter sweeps along the Yalu and Chong-Chong rivers as well as close air support attack missions. The squadron flew 2,032 sorties in the Sabres losing four out of the 22 aircraft supplied.

The war ended on 27 July 1953, when the Korean Armistice Agreement was signed. During the first phase of the war, the main task of the squadron Mustangs was the interdiction of enemy supply routes which not only accounted for approximately 61.45% of SAAF combat sorties, but which reached an early peak from January to May 1951 (78% and 82%). A typical interdiction mission was an armed reconnaissance patrol usually undertaken by flights of two or four aircraft armed with two napalm bombs, 127 mm rockets and 12.7 mm machine guns. Later, after the introduction of the Sabres, the squadron was also called on to provide counter-air missions flying as fighter sweeps and interceptions against MiG-15's, but interdiction and close air support remained the primary mission. Losses were 34 SAAF pilots killed, eight taken prisoner (including the future Chief of the Air Force, General D Earp) with 74 Mustangs and 4 Sabres lost. Pilots and men of the squadron received a total of 797 medals including 2 Silver Stars – the highest award to non-American nationals – 3 Legions of Merit, 55 Distinguished Flying Crosses and 40 Bronze Stars. In recognition of their association with 2 Squadron, the OC of 18th Fighter-Bomber Wing issued a policy directive "that all retreat ceremonies shall be preceded by the introductory bars of the South African national anthem. All personnel will render the honour to this anthem as our own."

On conclusion of hostilities, the Sabres were returned to the USAF and the squadron returned to South Africa in October 1953. During this period, the Union Defence Forces were reorganised into individual services and the SAAF became an arm of service in its own right, under an Air Chief of Staff (who was renamed "Chief of the Air Force" in 1966). It adopted a blue uniform, to replace the army khaki it had previously worn.

== Border War ==
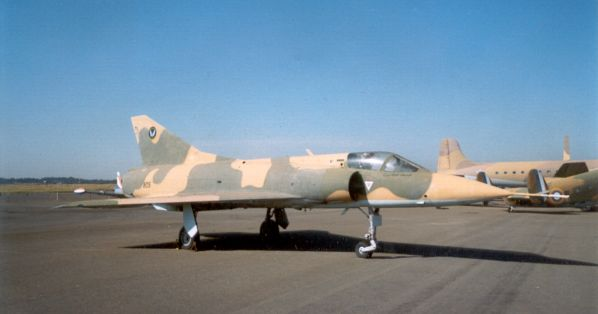
Mirage III of 2 Sqn as flown in 1980's

From 1966 to 1989, the SAAF was committed to the Border War, which was fought in northern South West Africa and surrounding states. At first, it provided limited air support to police operations against the People's Liberation Army of Namibia (the military wing of SWAPO, which was fighting to end South African rule of South West Africa). Operations intensified after the defence force took charge of the war in 1974.

The SAAF provided air support to the army during the 1975–76 Angola campaign, and in the many cross-border operations that were carried out against PLAN bases in Angola and Zambia from 1977 onwards.

At least two MiG-21s of the Angolan Air Force were shot down by 3 Squadron SAAF Mirage F1s in 1981 and 1982.

The SAAF was also heavily involved in the 1987–88 Angola campaign, before the peace settlement that ended the conflict. The international arms embargo imposed against the then-apartheid government of South Africa, meant that the SAAF was unable to procure modern fighter aircraft to compete with the sophisticated Soviet-supplied air defence network and Cuban Mikoyan-Gurevich MiG-23s fielded in the latter part of this conflict. South Africa collaborated with Israel, obtained blueprints by stealth, and innovatively designed and delivered the Cheetah fighter to overcome this challenge, while the Israelis delivered their Kfir fighter out of this joint venture. Both aircraft could use MiG engines which were easily obtained in either region.

From 1990 with the perceived reduction in threat, SAAF operational strength began to be reduced. The first short term steps entailed the withdrawal of several obsolete aircraft types from service, such as the Canberra B(1)12, the Super Frelon and Westland Wasp helicopters, the Kudu light aircraft and the P-166s Albatross coastal patrol aircraft. Other initial measures included the downgrading of Air Force Base Port Elizabeth and the disbanding of 12, 16, 24, 25, and 27 Squadrons. Two Commando squadrons – 103 Squadron SAAF at AFB Bloemspruit and 114 Squadron SAAF at AFB Swartkop – were also disbanded.

=== Major air operations ===
Major South African Air Force operations during the Border War: 1978–1988
Date	Operation	Location / Country	Aircraft and Role	Area Coordinates	Notes
May 1978	Reindeer	Cassinga, Angola	Para-drop: 4x C-130, 5x C-160; Para extraction and support: 14x Puma, 6x Super Frelon; Strike: 6x Canberra, 4x Buccaneer; CAP: 4x IIICZ; C³: 1x Cessna-185, 1x DC-4 (EW/ELINT)	15.117778°S 16.086389°E; 17.1287°S 14.8938°E; 17.333°S 14.8334°E	Air support for Operation Reindeer: composed of three main actions; the airborne assault on Cassinga, a mechanised assault on the Chetaquera complex at Chetequera and assault on the Dombondola SWAPO complex. Capt. A. Marais (Buccaneer pilot) awarded HCS for action in support of ground forces.
Jul 1979	Rekstok II	Muongo, Oncua, Henhombe and Heque in SE Angola			Mirage III R2Z (#856) lost due to AAA, pilot ejected and was recovered to AFB Ondangwa.
1979	Vanity, Placid and Motel	Eastern Angola and Zambia	Strike: Canberras from SAAF 12 Sqn with Rhodesian 5 Sqn Canberras		Operation Vanity: 25–26 Feb 1979 – bombing of ZIPRA camps in eastern Angola. Operations Placid I and II: 21 – 24 Aug 1979: Bombing of ZIPRA camps in Zambia. Operations Motel I and II: Aug 1979: Strikes on camps SW of Solwezi, Zambia.
Jun 1980	Sceptic / Smokeshell	Mulola and Ondova, Southern Angola			Impala Mk II (#1037) lost due to 23mm AAA fire. Pilot ejected and was recovered to HAA in Evale, Angola. Aircraft was recovered by Super Frelon and returned to service with same side number. Alouette III (#24) lost due to small arms fire. Pilot escaped, Flight Engineer killed.
Jun 1980	Sceptic II				Air operations in support of initial raid on SWAPO base in South Angola (Sceptic) which was expanded into an extended operation as more and more SWAPO caches were discovered in the area (Septic II). First clashes between SADF and Angolan Defence Forces (FAPLA).
19 December 1980	Wishbone	Mid-level bombing attacks on bases in Angola at Oshiheng near Ongiva and Palele close to Xangongo.	Four formations of aircraft from Grootfontein and Ondangwa. 4x Buccaneer, Mirage F1s and 1x Canberra.		
Aug – Sep 1981	Protea	Cunene province, Angola	Strike and CAS: 12x F1AZ, 8x F1CZ, 7x IIICZ, 6x IIID2Z, 16x Impala, 5x Buccaneer, 5x Canberra; PR: 1x Canberra, 3x IIIRZ, 2x Impala; CAS: 19x Alouette III; Tactical Transport: 17x Puma, 2x Super Frelon, 8 x Kudu; Para-drop and Logistics: 7x Dakota, 3x C130/160; AFC and C³: 11x Bosbok	16.7491°S 14.9745°E	Capt. R.C.M. Lewer DFC, HCS awarded HCS for Impala night attack on enemy positions threatening SADF stopper group on evening preceding commencement of Operation Protea. Alouette III (#48) lost to 14.5mm AAA. Crew killed.
Nov 1981	Daisy	Chitequeta, southern Angola	CAP and Strike: 20x F1; PR: 2x IIIRZ; CAS: 15x Impala; Army Support: 9x Puma, 2x Frelon, 10x Alouette; Air Transport: 4x DC3, 6x C130/160, 1x DC4; AFC and C³: 9x Bosbok	16.7923°S 17.9315°E	Air operations in support of ground attacks on SWAPO regional headquarters at Chitequeta in Southern Angola.
Mar 1982	Super	Kaokoveld, South West Africa and Angolan province of Namibe		17.350638°S 12.441811°E	Air support to ground force operation to prevent SWAPO infiltration into South West Africa through the Kaokoveld from a location near the abandoned Portuguese town of Iona. Capt N. Ellis and F/Sgt S. Coetzee awarded HC for close air support to army forces.
Mar 1982	Rekstok III				
9 Aug 1982	Meebos				1x Puma (#132) lost due to AAA, killing flight crew of 3 and 12 paratroopers.
Oct 1982	Bravo				
1983	Maanskyn				
23 May 1983	Skerve	Suburb of Matola, Maputo. Mozambique	Strike: 12x Impala Mk II; PR and C³: 1x Canberra; CAP: 2x Mirage F1AZ; SEAD: 2x Mirage F1AZ	25.932112°S 32.465235°E	SAAF raid against ANC targets (Note: Gabuze House: planning office for "Transvaal Urban Machinery"; September House: ANC planning centre; Logistics HQ; "Main Camp" training area.) in Mozambique in retaliation for car-bomb explosion outside Air force HQ in Pretoria on 20 May 1983. 12 Impala Mk II aircraft used in strike, 4x 4 Sqn, 4x 8 Sqn and 4x aircraft from AFB Hoedspruit. Impala's armed with 24 x 68mm rockets and 220 rounds 30mm cannon each.
Aug 1983	Karton				
Nov 1983 – Jan 1984	Askari	Cuvelai, Cunene province, Angola			SAAF operations supporting Operation Askari aimed at disrupting logistical support and command & control capabilities of PLAN (SWAPO's military wing) to suppress a large-scale incursion into South West Africa planned for early of 1984. Area:15°12′0″S 16°26′0″E. First effective use of Scout RPV system to locate SA-8 batteries.
1985	Second Congress				
11 Sep – 8 Oct 1985	Wallpaper		C130, C-160, L-100, DC-3	17°27′21″S 22°36′47″E	Air logistic support to UNITA against a coalition of Cuban and the People's Armed Forces for the Liberation of Angola (FAPLA) troops at Mavinga. SAAF flew 310 night flying hours transporting UNITA troops in support of ground operations in support of defence of UNITA headquarters at Jamba.
	Weldmesh				
Jun – Nov 1987	Moduler	Cuito Cuanavale, Angola	Army Support: Alouette IIIs, Pumas; CAP and PR escort: F1CZs; CAS and Strike missions: F1AZ, Buccaneer; PR: IIR2Z; AFC: Bosbok, RPV		Operation to halt Angolan / Cuban advance on Mavinga. Pumas used for special forces insertion and extraction. 1x F1CZ damaged by MiG-23 AAM-8 missile; crash landed Rundu 27 Sep 87. SA-8 SAM system captured and flown back to S Afr by C160. 3x RPV and 1x Bosbok (#934) lost to SA-8 SAM Sep 87, pilot killed.
Nov 1987 – Mar 1988	Hooper	Cuito Cuanavale, Angola		15.10°S 19.10°E	Mirage F1AZ (#245) lost to SA-13 SAM. Pilot (Major Edward Richard Every: 1 Sqn) killed.
Mar – May 1988	Packer	Cuito Cuanavale, Angola		15.158299°S 19.224598°E	
Abbreviations • CAP: Combat air patrol • PR: Photo reconnaissance • CAS: Close air support • C³: Command, control and communications • AFC: Airborne artillery fire control • HAA: Helicopter administration area • AAA: Anti-aircraft artillery • SEAD: Suppression of enemy air defences

During the bush war, the SAAF lost a total of 22 aircraft (Note: 1x Mirage F1AZ, 1x Mirage III R2Z, 1x Canberra, 5x Impala Mk. II, 1x Bosbok, 1x Cessna-185, 4x Puma, 5x Alouette, 3x RPV.) (1974–1989) to enemy action. A further 11 aircraft (Note: 3x Impala, 1x Mirage F1AZ, 2x Puma, 1x Kudu, 3x Alouette, 1x Cessna-185.) were lost in the operational area due to pilot error or malfunction.

=== Missile based air defence ===
From the early 1960s, the South African Air Force was also responsible for command of all Surface-to-air missile forces as part of the air defence of South Africa and South West Africa. In July 1964, South Africa placed a development contract with Thomson-CSF for a mobile, all-weather, low-altitude SAM system after a South African order for the Bloodhound SAM system was refused by the UK government. The South African government paid 85 per cent of the development costs of the system with the balance being paid for by France. The system was known as "Cactus" within the SAAF and "Crotale" in France. The units were operationally deployed in platoons in 1971 with each platoon consisting of one Acquisition and Co-ordination Unit (ACU) and two or three firing units, with a battery having two platoons. All Cactus air defence batteries were placed under command of 120 Squadron until the retirement of the system in the late 1980s.

== Nuclear and ballistic weapons ==
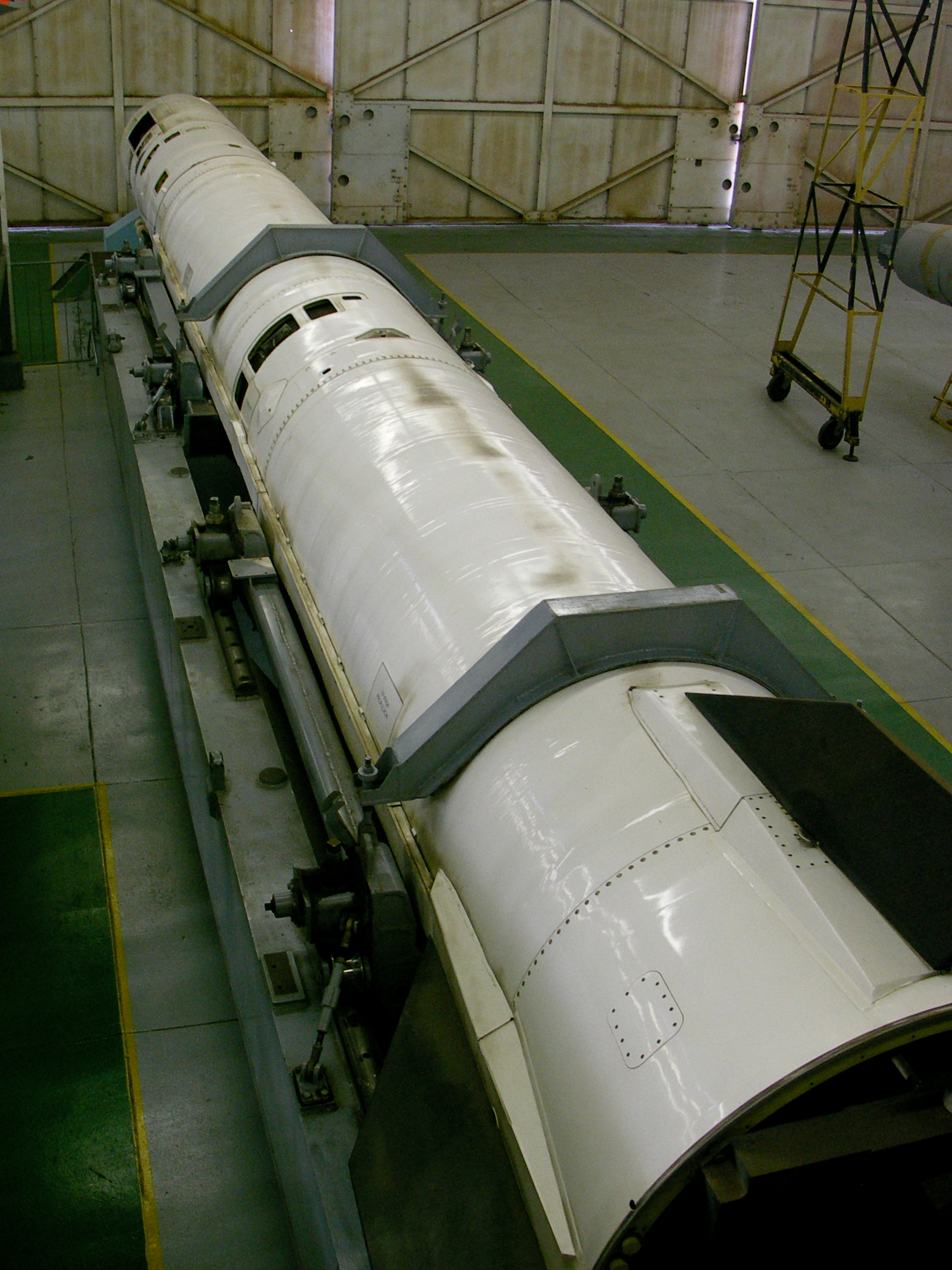
RSA-3 ballistic missile delivery system

During the bush war period, South Africa manufactured six air-deliverable tactical nuclear weapons of the "gun-type" design between 1978 and 1993. Each of the devices contained 55 kilograms of HEU with an estimated yield of 10–18 kilotons designed for delivery by Buccaneer or Canberra aircraft. In parallel, South Africa initiated a ballistic missile programme to develop an improved delivery system. The RSA-2 was developed as a prototype intermediate range delivery system very similar to, or a licensed copy of the Israeli Jericho-2 missile, the RSA-1 being a modified Jericho II second stage used alone for mobile application. A third stage apogee kick motor was added to produce the RSA-3 space launcher with a 1,900 km range and 1,500 kg payload. The RSA-4 ICBM / satellite launcher was a planned follow-on to the RSA-3 and with an optimised first stage was supposed to have double the payload capacity of the RSA-3. It is not known if the RSA-4 was ever tested. Work on the RSA-4 was cancelled in 1994.

== Since 1994 ==
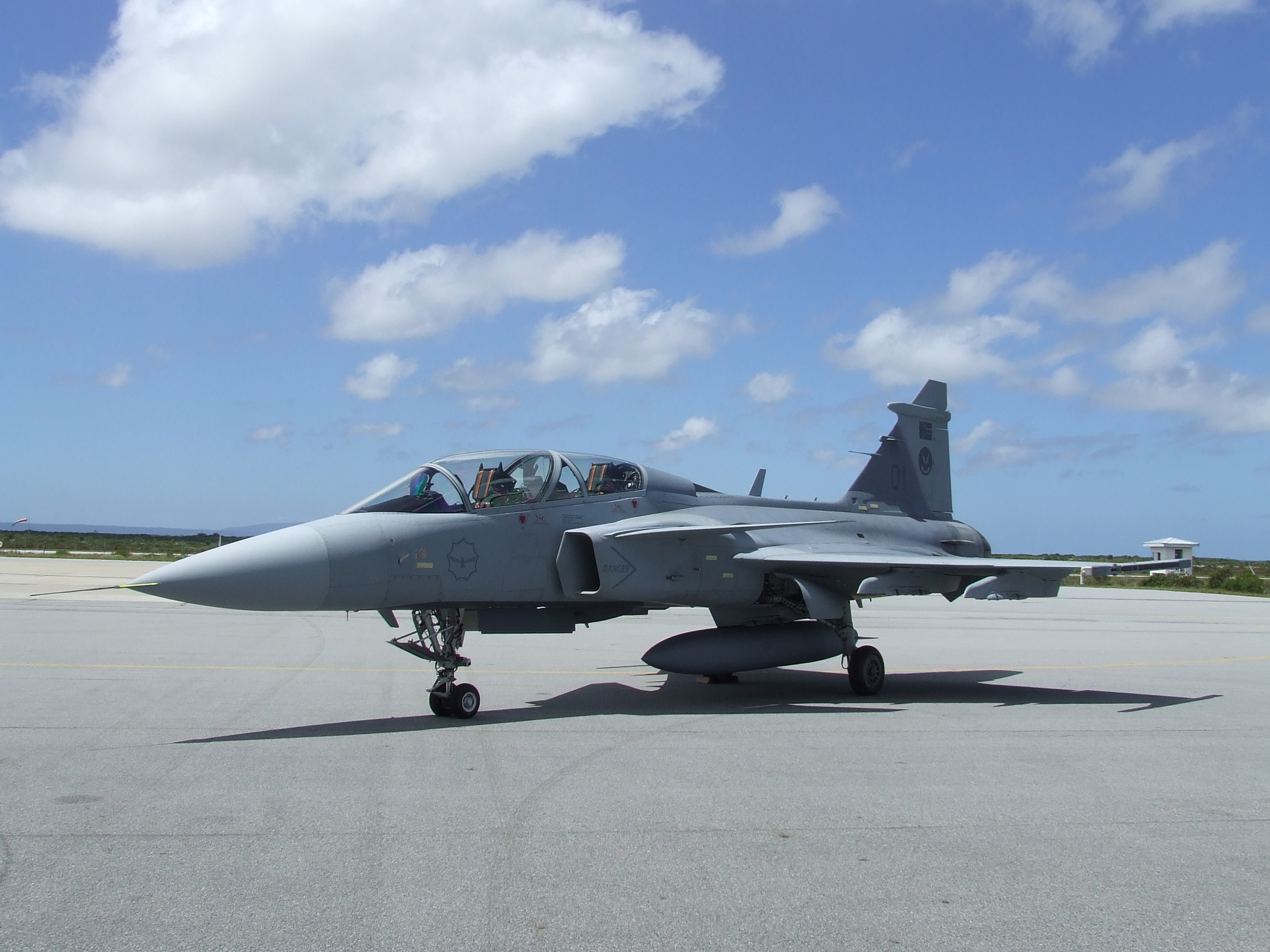
A SAAF Gripen in 2007

After the first multi-racial elections were held in 1994, the SAAF became an integrated air force as part of the South African National Defence Force (SANDF).

The South African Air Force is currently considered to be the most effective air force in sub-Sahara Africa despite the loss of capability as a consequence of defence cuts after the end of the Border War. These financial cuts have brought about a number of severe operational limitations, compounded by the loss of experienced air-crews. This has placed strain on the bringing new types of aircraft into service, specifically the Gripen, Hawk, Rooivalk, A 109 and Lynx. The cancellation of the SAAF participation and procurement of the A400M in November 2009 has prevented the SAAF from any strategic airlift capability needed for domestic, regional and continent-wide operations. There is no clear indication as yet regarding how the heavy/long-range airlift gap will be addressed. Current air combat capabilities are limited to the Gripen multi-role fighter and the Rooivalk combat support helicopter – although in insufficient number to allow regional deployments while maintaining national air space protection and training obligations. To overcome this shortfall, the SAAF has designated the Hawk Mk 120 trainers for additional tactical reconnaissance and weapon delivery platforms for targets designated by the Gripen's. Financial constraints have further limited flying hours on the newly acquired aircraft; it is planned to keep Gripen pilots current flying the lower cost Hawk aircraft with "Gripenised" cockpits. The number of current Gripen pilots is currently (2011) classified as secret.
