= Southern Air Command SAAF =

Military unit

Southern Air Command was a formation of the South African Air Force, active from the early 1980s to the early 1990s. Throughout its existence, it had its headquarters at Silvermine, in the Cape Province.

== Coastal Command ==
During the Second World War, a predecessor formation had been Coastal Command. 27 Squadron was formed from 33 Flight at St Albans in Port Elizabeth on 1 July 1942 and was deployed as a torpedo bomber / coastal reconnaissance squadron patrolling the South African coast flying aged Avro Ansons as part of Coastal Command. The command consisted of 27 Squadron SAAF at Walvis Bay and Rooikop and a detachment at Aus; 6 Squadron SAAF at Eerste River; 23 Squadron SAAF at Darling; 25 Squadron SAAF at Port Elizabeth and East London; 22 Squadron SAAF at Lombazi and Matubatuba; 29 Squadron SAAF also at Lombazi and 10 Squadron SAAF at Durban and Isipingo.

By the end of World War II, SAAF aircraft in conjunction with British and Dutch aircraft stationed in South Africa, had intercepted seventeen enemy ships, assisted in the rescue of 437 survivors of sunken ships and attacked 26 of the 36 enemy submarines that operated around the South African coast and had flown 15,000 coastal patrol sorties by August 1945.

== Maritime Command and Southern Command ==
After a reorganisation in the early 1980s that ended the existence of Maritime Air Command SAAF, the command was created. It included nine squadrons (three reserve), based at AFS Port Elizabeth, Cape Town Airport, and AFB Ysterplaat. These squadrons included two of Aermacchi MB.326s, 35 Squadron SAAF (Avro Shackleton), 27 Squadron SAAF (Piaggio P.166), 22 Squadron SAAF of Wasps and Alouettes, 30 Squadron SAAF of Super Frelons and Pumas, 16 Squadron SAAF (Alouettes), 25 Squadron SAAF flying Dakotas from Ysterplaat, and 88 Maritime Training School (Ysterplaat).

By the early 1990s the command had shrunk to four squadrons - two of Dakotas (25 and 35 Squadrons), 27 Squadron with Piaggio P.166As, and a squadron of Aérospatiale Alouette IIIs.

== See also ==
- History of the South African Air Force

== Notes ==
=== References ===
- Martin, H.J. (Lt-Gen); Orpen, N.D. (1979). South Africa at War: Military and Industrial Organisation and Operations in connection with the conduct of War: 1939-1945 (South African Forces World War II: Volume VII). Cape Town: Purnell. p. 282. ISBN 0-86843-025-0.
- Peacock, Lindsay, and Bob Munro. The World's Air Forces: An Illustrated Review of the Air Forces of the World. Salamander Books, 1991.
