= 29 Squadron SAAF =

29 Squadron
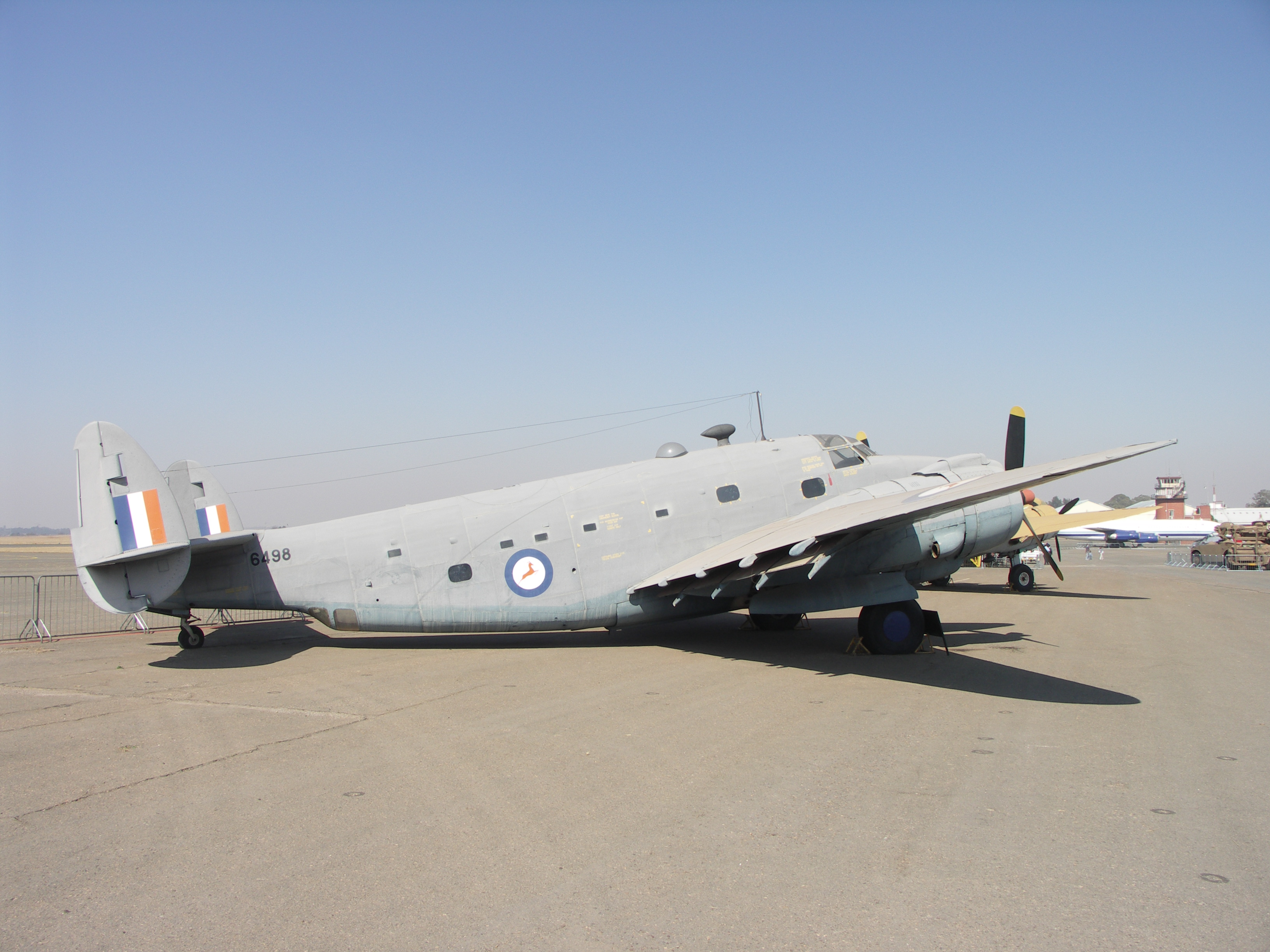
- SAAF Lockheed PV1 Ventura. This was the only aircraft type flown by the squadron.
- Active: ?? - November 1943, August 1944 - ??
- Country: (South Africa)
- Branch: South African Air Force
- Role: Coastal Patrol and Shipping Escort
- Part of: Coastal Command SAAF

29 Squadron was one of the Coastal Command SAAF of the South African Air Force during the Second World War. It was assigned the role of maritime patrol and shipping escort and operated Venturas from Lombazi on the Pondoland coast. With the decline in activities in the war at sea, the squadron was disbanded on 15 November 1943 and absorbed into 29 Operational Training Unit based at Darling in the Cape. The squadron was re-activated in August 1944 and deployed to Matubatuba in Zululand from where it once again operated with Venturas. At this time, the squadron did very little flying (3hrs escort flying between 25 August and 24 September 1944) and was disbanded at the end of the war.
