= Operation Karton =

- Part of the South African Border War and Angolan Civil War

- Location: Angola Operation Karton (Angola)
- Target: Support UNITA's attack on Cangamba by means of artillery training and fire support.
- Date: July – August 1983
- Outcome: UNITA-South African victory

Operation Karton (English: Operation Cardboard) was a secret military operation during August 1983 by the South African Defence Force (SADF) during the South African Border War and Angolan Civil War.

== Background ==
Cangamba is an Angolan town in the province of Moxico. It was garrisoned by soldiers of FAPLA's 32 Brigade and forty to sixty Cuban instructors and due to the conditions of the roads in the region, was supplied by air from Menongue. During late July, UNITA had briefly raided the town but FAPLA failed to strengthen its defences. UNITA sought the help of the SADF for mortar and artillery training as well as fire support in the next attack against Cangamba. A SADF artillery team was formed and flown to a secret special forces base in the Caprivi where they met to train the UNITA artillerymen in captured Soviet 120 mm mortars and 76 mm artillery before moving northwards into Angola.

== Battle ==
UNITA attacked on 1 August with between 3000 and 6000 soldiers with the SADF team assisting the next day with artillery observation. The FAPLA troops in Cangamba called for reinforcements which were assembled in Huambo, Menongue and Lubango but would take a week to cross UNITA territory to reach the garrison. The FAPLA garrison was bombarded by UNITA artillery for three days before attempting frontal assaults which incurred high casualties. UNITA then resorted to digging trenches driving them closer to the Angolan positions. The UNITA artillery attack continued and by the 7 August the FAPLA and Cuban troops were short of ammunition and water. By this time the UNITA troops were being subjected to FAPLA/Cuban air attacks and took casualties. On the 10 August, the FAPLA relief columns arrived covered by a FAPLA/Cuban air strike on UNITA positions. The Cuban troop were said to be airlifted out while garrison and relief columns had to fight their way out. Two days after the relief columns arrived, the South African Air Force (SAAF) was called in on 12 August to assist UNITA. Canberra bombers and Impala aircraft conducted extensive airstrikes against Cangamba. By 14 August the battle was over.

== Aftermath ==
Although UNITA was able to displace FAPLA from Cangamba and central Moxico, the battle had proved to be far costlier than the quick seizure and show of strength that Savimbi had initially hoped for. The operation decimated around a third of UNITA's semi-regular battalions which significantly reduced its operational capacity in the short term.

Estimates of FAPLA losses range from sixty to seventy killed and 157 wounded to several hundred casualties, the majority of which were inflicted in the week of 2 to 9 August. ODP militia losses were not precisely recorded but were said to have been substantial during the initial UNITA assault. Cuban losses totaled seventeen dead and thirty wounded. UNITA was said to have lost 1100 soldiers and possibly the same amount wounded.
