= No. 223 Squadron RAF =

- Official badge of No. 223 Squadron RAF
- Active: 1917–1919; 1936–1944; 1944–1945; 1959–1963
- Country: UK
- Branch: Royal Air Force
- Role: Bomber squadron/Operational training unit
- Mottos: Latin: Alæ defendunt Africam ("Wings defend Africa")

No. 223 Squadron RAF was a squadron of the Royal Air Force. Originally formed as part of the Royal Naval Air Service (RNAS), the Squadron flew in both World Wars.

== History ==
What later became 223 Squadron was formed as B Flight (soon known as "B Squadron") of the RNAS operating from Mytilene on the island of Lesbos as a general duties unit. It was equipped with a mixture of aircraft types including the Sopwith 1½ Strutter and Airco DH.4. On 1 April 1918, the RNAS was merged with the Royal Flying Corps to produce the RAF, with B Squadron becoming No. 223 Squadron. It continued operations over the Aegean Sea, flying both reconnaissance and bombing missions from various bases until the end of World War I, disbanding at Mudros on the island of Lemnos on 16 May 1919.

The squadron reformed at Nairobi (RAF Nairobi, soon to become RAF Eastleigh) in Kenya on 15 December 1936 as a day bomber squadron when "B" Flight of 45 Squadron, equipped with the Fairey Gordon, was renumbered. It re-equipped with the Vickers Vincent in February 1937. Vickers Wellesley monoplanes followed in June 1938, and these still remained in service when Italy entered World War II. The squadron, based at Summit in Sudan, flew bombing missions against Italian forces in the East African Campaign over Italian East Africa. In August 1940, the squadron moved to Perim Island, near Aden to support operations in Italian Somaliland.

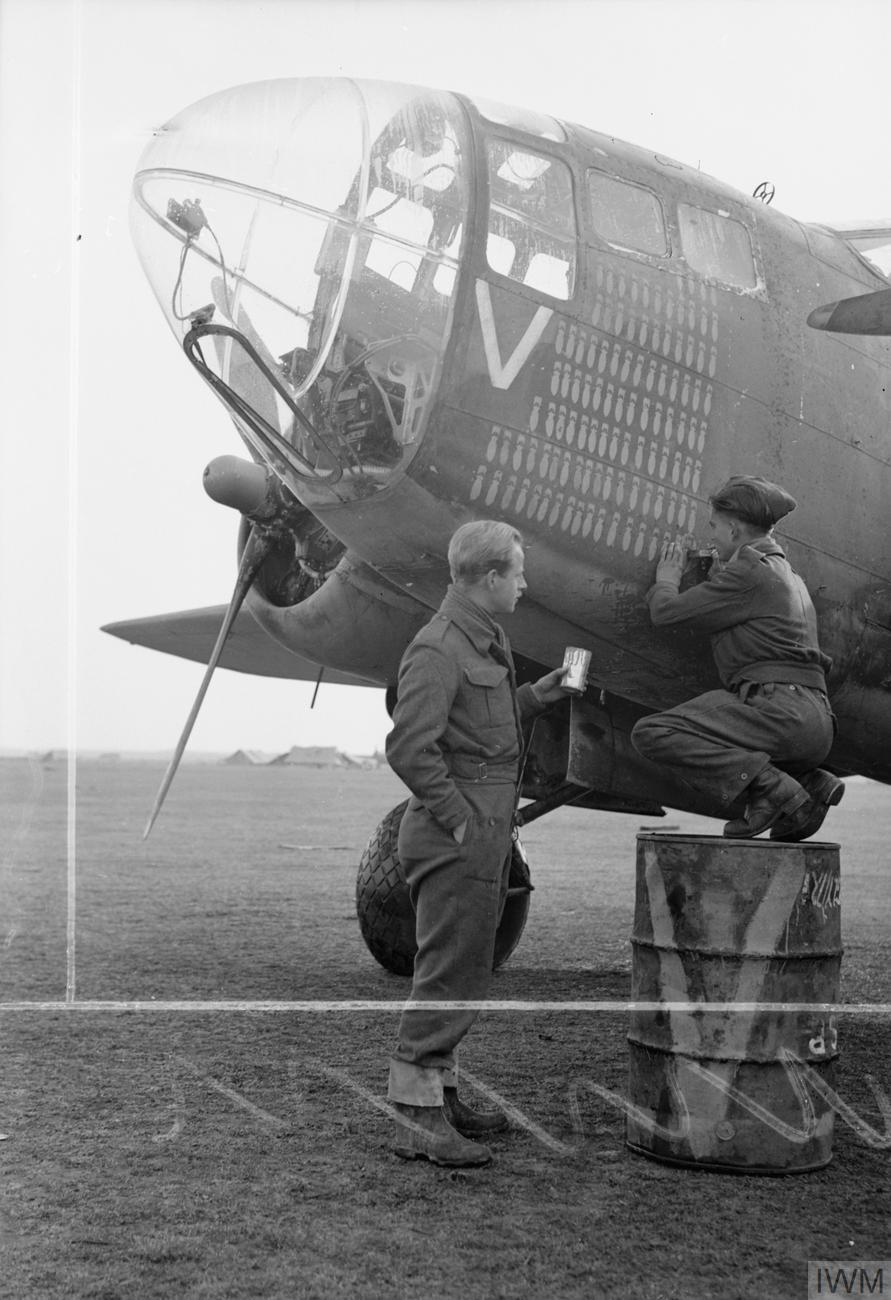
Ground crew with 223 Squadron Martin Baltimore in Italy

In April 1941, it handed its Wellesleys to 47 Squadron and moved to Egypt, becoming an Operational Training Unit (OTU), converting aircrews onto the Bristol Blenheim, Douglas Boston, Martin Maryland and later Martin Baltimore twin-engined bombers. From October 1941, a Maryland-equipped detachment of the squadron was deployed on long-range strategic reconnaissance duties, while the rest of the squadron continued as an OTU. In May 1942, the squadron returned to operational light bomber duties, equipped with the new Baltimore bomber, supporting the British Eighth Army over North Africa. It flew its first operation with the Baltimore on 23 May 1942, when four unescorted Baltimores were sent to bomb a German-held airfield. They were attacked by German fighters, with two bombers shot down and the other two, badly damaged, crash-landing at their base. Following this mission, unescorted bombing missions were abandoned, and the aircraft's American .30 inch Browning machine guns, which had jammed during the engagement, were replaced by guns firing British .303 inch ammunition. It moved to Malta in July 1943, participating in the Allied invasion of Sicily and the Italian Campaign, being based in Italy from September 1943. It was disbanded on 12 August 1944, being renumbered No. 30 Squadron, South African Air Force.

It was quickly reformed back in England on 23 August as a Bomber Support squadron as part of 100 Group of RAF Bomber Command, flying Consolidated Liberator and Boeing Fortress four-engined bombers on radio counter measures missions, helping to disrupt German night defences by jamming its radar and communications. It was disbanded again on 29 July 1945.

The squadron was again reformed on 1 December 1959 as a Strategic Missile squadron equipped with the Thor Intermediate range ballistic missile at RAF Folkingham in Lincolnshire. The squadron was disbanded on 23 August 1963, with the termination of the Thor Program in Britain.

== Aircraft operated (B Flight and B Squadron RNAS, 223 Squadron RAF) ==
Source except where stated.

- Sopwith 1½ Strutter
- Airco DH.4
- Sopwith 2F.1 Camel
- Airco DH.9
- Fairey Gordon
- Vickers Vincent
- Vickers Wellesley
- Bristol Blenheim
- Martin Maryland
- Douglas Boston
- Martin Baltimore
- Consolidated Liberator
- Boeing Fortress
- PGM-17 Thor
