= 120 Squadron SAAF =

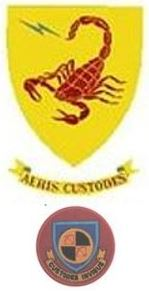
- 120 Squadron, part of 250 ADAG
- Active: 1970–2002
- Country: South Africa
- Branch: South African Air Force
- Role: Missile based air defence

120 Squadron SAAF was a South African Air Force squadron formed in 1970 to operate the South African/French Cactus surface-to-air missile systems in an air defence role. The unit was disbanded when the Cactus system was retired from service in the late 1980s.

== History ==
In July 1964, South Africa placed a development contract with Thomson-CSF for a mobile, all-weather, low-altitude SAM system after a South African order for the Bloodhound SAM system was refused by the UK government.

The South African government paid 85 per cent of the development costs of the system with the balance being paid for by France. The system was known as "Cactus" within the SA Air Force and "Crotale" in France.

All Cactus air defence batteries were placed under the command of the Air Defence Artillery Group's 120 Squadron. 120 Squadron was stationed with the rest of ADAG 67 km north of Pretoria at Pienaarsriver.

The Air Defence Artillery Group was disbanded in 1992 after the Cactus mk 1 missile system was retired, with only remnants of 120 Squadron, operating the upgraded Cactus mk 2 Container system, becoming part of the Air Command Control Unit at Snake Valley, stationed opposite Air Force Base Swartkop on the eastern side of the shared runway.

120 Squadron was finally disbanded in 2002 after these systems were retired.

| Variant | Description | Comment | Image |
|---|---|---|---|
| Cactus Mk 1 Missile Firing Unit | Original version | France design | Cactus Missile Firing Unit |
| Cactus Mk 1 Acquisition Unit | Original version | France design | SANDF Cactus Acquisition Unit |
| Cactus Mk 2 | Container truck transported | South Africa design | Cactus SAM Container system |

== Deployment ==
Cactus units were operationally deployed in platoons in 1971 with each platoon consisting of one Acquisition and Co-ordination Unit (ACU) and two or three firing units, with a battery having two platoons.

A typical platoon consisted of one Acquisition and Co-ordination Unit (ACU) and two to three firing units, with a battery having two platoons. All the operators, had one ACU vehicle to two firing units. The ACU carried out target surveillance, identification and designation. Mounted on the top of the vehicle was a Thomson-CSF pulse Doppler radar with fixed-echo suppression which rotated at 60 rpm and had a maximum detection range of 18.5 km against low-level targets with speeds of between 35 and 440 m/s and altitude limits between zero and 4,500 m. The system also had an IFF interrogator-decoder. The computer, which was the same as that installed in the firing unit, was used to generate data for confirmation of threat evaluation. Once a target had been detected, the computer would trigger an IFF interrogator and the final threat information would be displayed.

The target would then be allocated to one of the firing units and target designation data and operational orders were transmitted by the datalink which also supplied information from the firing unit on operational status. The firing unit had a J-band monopulse 17 km range single target tracking radar mounted concentrically with the launcher turret, which carried four ready to launch missiles, two on each side. The system also had an I-band 10° antenna beam-width command transmitter, differential angle-error measurement infrared tracking and gathering system with a +-5° wide field of view, an integrated TV tracking mode as a low-elevation back-up, an optical designation tripod-mounted binocular device (which is controlled manually by a handlebar arrangement and used primarily in a heavy ECM environment or whenever passive operation was required), computer, operating console and datalink.

All vehicles were fitted with an inter-vehicle link network to transmit data and orders by cable and for radio communication by a VHF radio link. The radar could track one target and guide one or two missiles simultaneously. The missiles, fired 2.5 seconds apart, were acquired immediately after launch by the 1.1° tracking beam of the radar with the help of infrared detection and radar transponders during the gathering phase. Initially the transponder was the 8,000 m range Thomson-CSF Stresa. Guidance signals were transmitted to the missiles by a remote-control system.

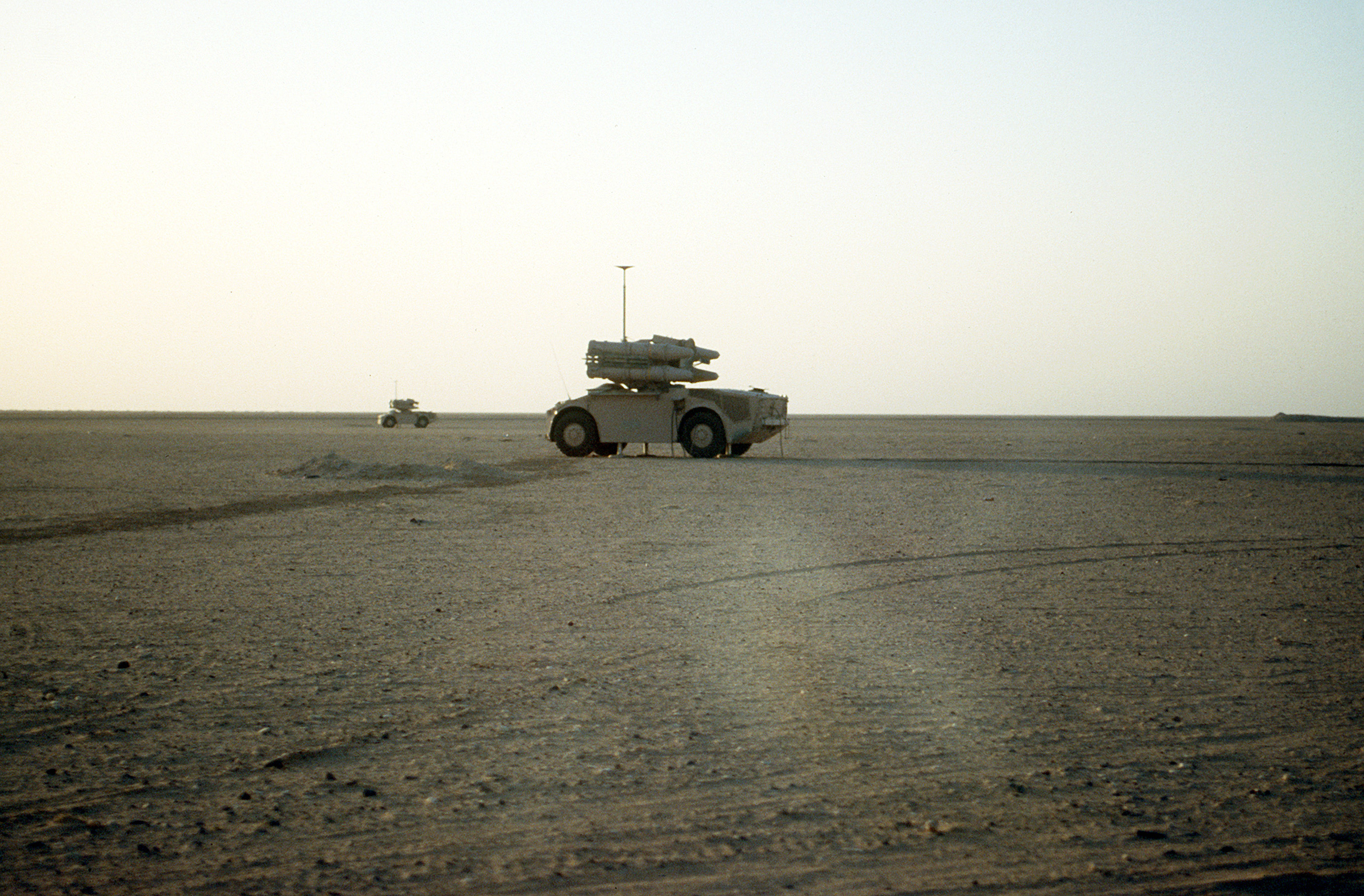
An Egyptian Crotale surface-air missile system, similar to that operated by 120 Squadron.

No spare missiles were carried on the vehicle and fresh missiles were brought up by a truck and loaded with a light crane. A well-trained crew of three could load four missiles in about two minutes. The missile was designated the R440 and weighed 84 kg, had an overall length of 2.89 m, span of 0.54 m and a diameter of 0.15 m. The missile complete with its transport/launch container weighed 100 kg. The HE high-energy focused fragmentation warhead in the centre of the missile weighs 15 kg, had a lethal radius of 8 m for the 2,300 m/s velocity fragments and was activated in the original R440 missiles by either the infrared proximity fuze (the fuze was commanded to activate 350 m before interception) or back-up contact fuze. The missile had an SNPE Lens III rocket motor with 25.45 kg of solid propellant powder. The missile reached a maximum speed of 750 m/s in 2.8 seconds.

=== Cactus Upgrade ===
African Defense Systems have over the years upgraded the Cactus system. The Acquisition Radar and missile Firing Unit (FU) mobile vehicles were containerized and outdated computer systems replaced. Using the new object-oriented software, the FU was then able to fuse tracking data from the optical and radar sensors to achieve better quality tracking. Interfacing to Command and Control structures was also achieved.
