= 25 Squadron SAAF =

25 Squadron
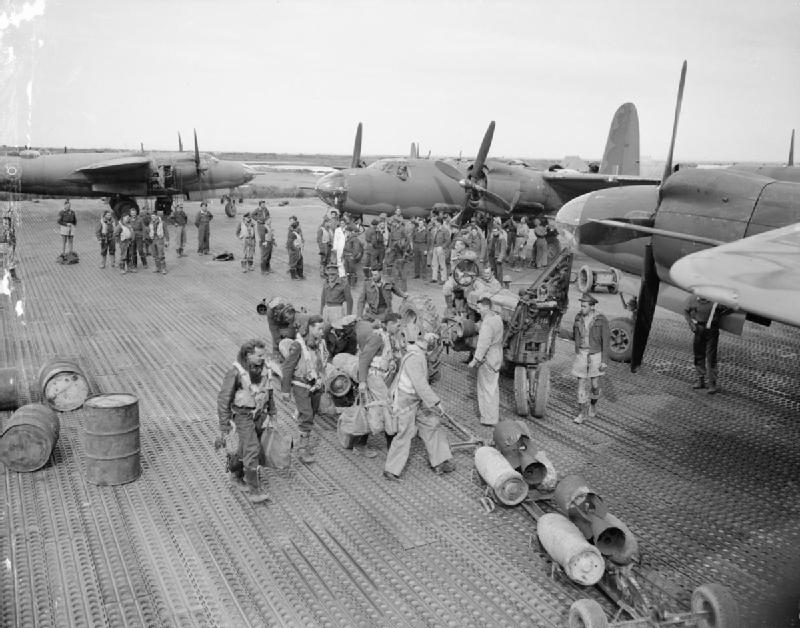
- SAAF and RAF crews of 25 Squadron SAAF gather by their Martin Marauders at Biferno, Italy as part of the Balkan Air force
- Active: July 1942-July 1945; Jan 1951-Nov 1953; Feb 1968-Oct 1990
- Country: (South Africa)
- Branch: South African Air Force
- Role: Maritime Patrol & Tactical Bomber (WWII); Medium Transport (post WWII)
- Motto(s): "Adiuvamus" (We Help)

Insignia
- Squadron Identification Code: P 1944-1945
- 25 Squadron Insignia

25 Squadron was a maritime patrol and later medium bomber squadron of the South African Air Force during World War II. It was re-constituted twice between 1951 and 1990 as a medium transport squadron and was finally disbanded in October 1990.

== History ==
=== Indian and Atlantic Oceans ===
The squadron was formed from 33 Flight at St Albans in Port Elizabeth on 1 July 1942 and was deployed as a torpedo bomber / coastal reconnaissance squadron patrolling the South African coast flying aged Avro Ansons as part of Coastal Command SAAF. The Ansons were gradually replaced and on 12 September 1942 the first Lockheed Ventura Mk I was received and by end 1942 the squadron was only operating Venturas in coastal operations. The first operational deployment was that of Operation Volley, where Venturas from 23 and 25 Squadrons were deployed to intercept German blockade runners together with HMS Sirius and HMS Phoebe in a 400-mile coastal belt off Agulhas between 15 and 21 September 1942.

The German submarine U-504 had been attacking Allied shipping off Cape Agulhas from October 1942 and the squadron was deployed to search for the submarine together with HMS Express and HMS Catterick – unsuccessful patrols failed to prevent the sinking of SS Empire Chaucer, SS City of Johannesburg and US Liberty ship Anne Hutchinson (which broke in two) – the squadron did however succeed in escorting the bow portion of Anne Hutchinson under tow of the South African minesweeper HMSAS David Haigh back to port in Port Elizabeth.

=== Mediterranean ===
In May 1944 the squadron was moved to the Mediterranean with the sea party sailing from Durban on the 13 May for Port Tewfik en route to Pomigliano in Italy and the first five aircraft left AFB Swartkop on the 2 June. By September the squadron was operating from Campomarino landing ground at Biferno. It was planned that the squadron and its Venturas would be used for anti-submarine patrols but by the time it reached the Mediterranean, there was no longer any need for additional anti-submarine squadrons and it was subsequently assigned as part of the Balkan Air Force.

=== Balkans ===
The squadron commenced operations in the Balkans on 30 August 1944 and was converted to Martin B-26 Marauder IIIs on 20 November 1944 flying tactical bombing missions in support of Tito partisans in Yugoslavia. The squadron operated from Pomigliano d'Arco in Italy and remained part of the Balkan Air Force until the end of the war, when it was moved back to the Union of South Africa and disbanded on 15 July 1945.

=== South Africa ===
On 1 January 1951, the squadron was re-constituted and equipped with Douglas C-47 Dakotas taken over from the Citizen Force 21 Squadron and operated on a part-time basis until the unit was re-numbered as 44 Squadron on 13 November 1953. It was again re-established at AFB Ysterplaat in February 1968 and re-equipped with C-47s until October 1990 when it was disbanded for the last time.

== Aircraft ==
Aircraft flown by 25 Squadron
Note: Aircraft type photographs may not necessarily represent aircraft of the same mark or actual aircraft belonging to the squadron.
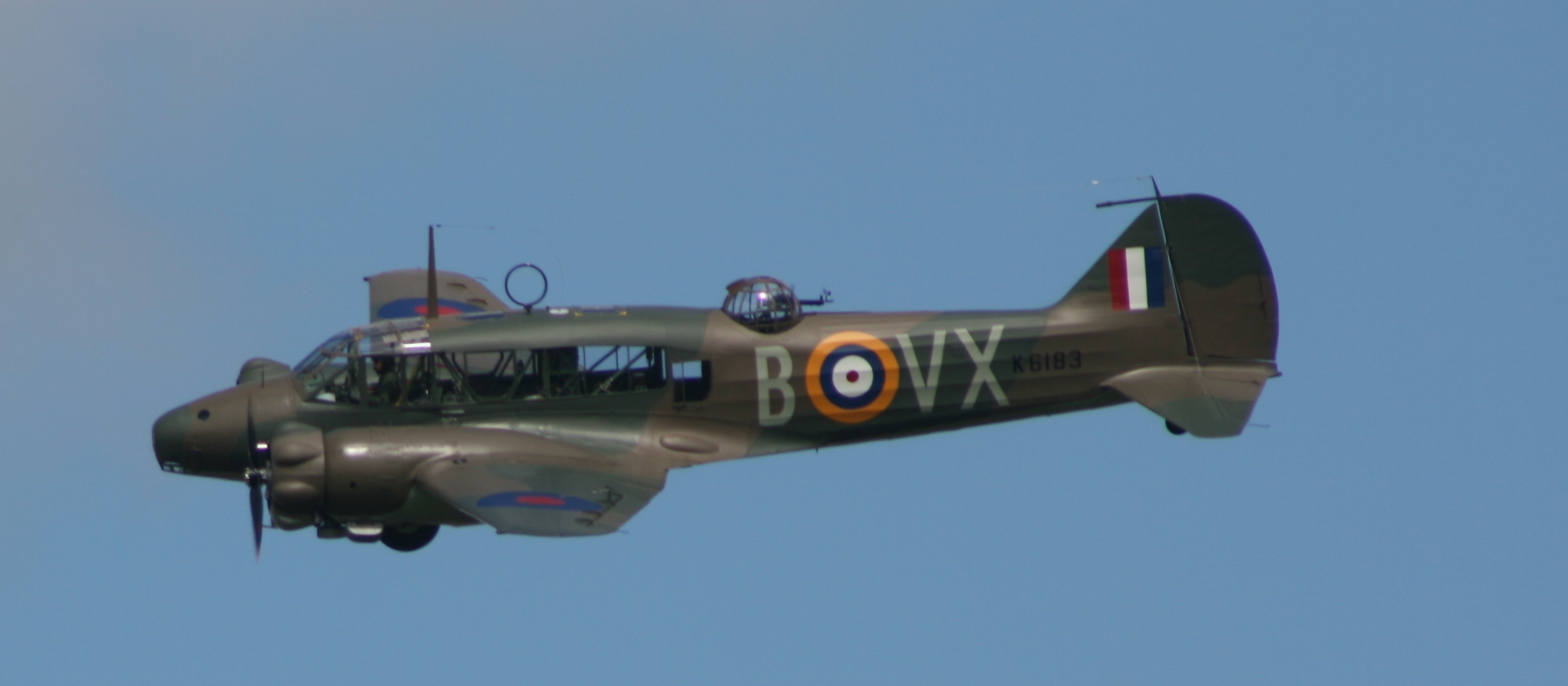
Avro Anson
1942

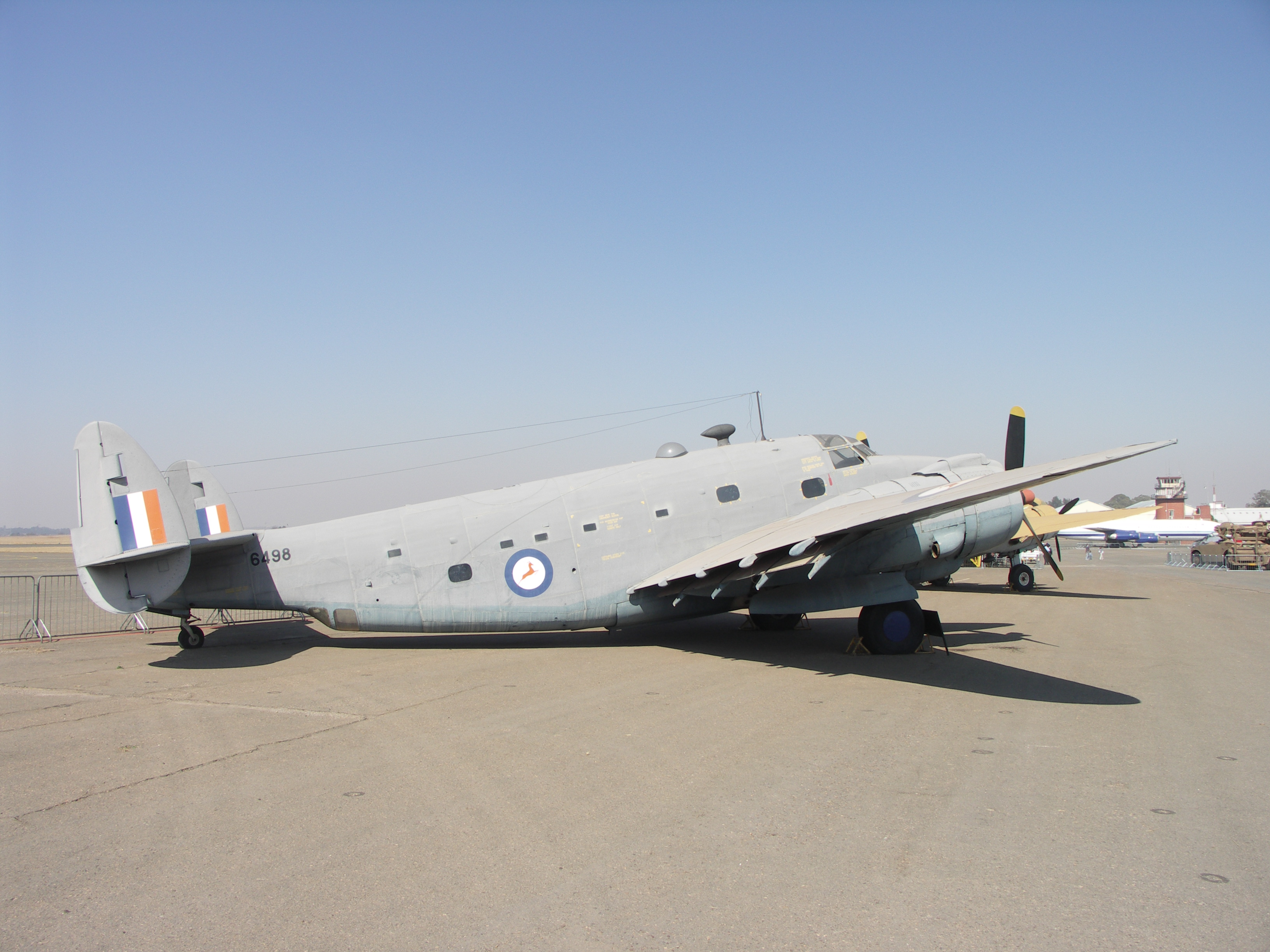
PV1 Ventura
1942

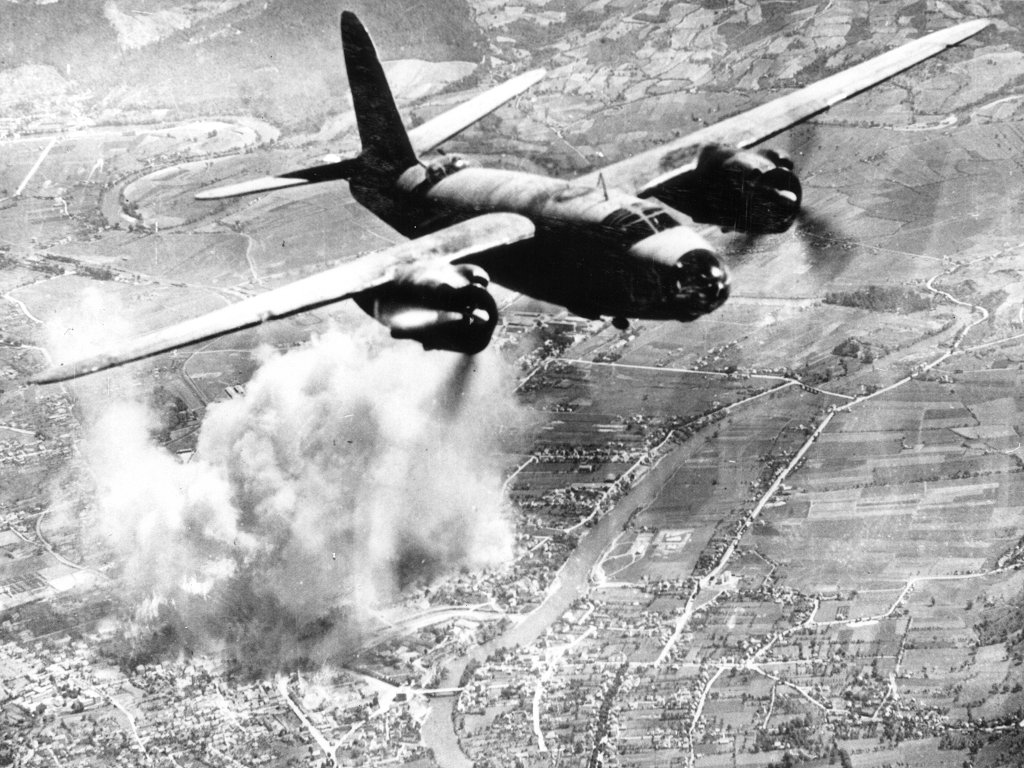
Marauder Mk II
1944

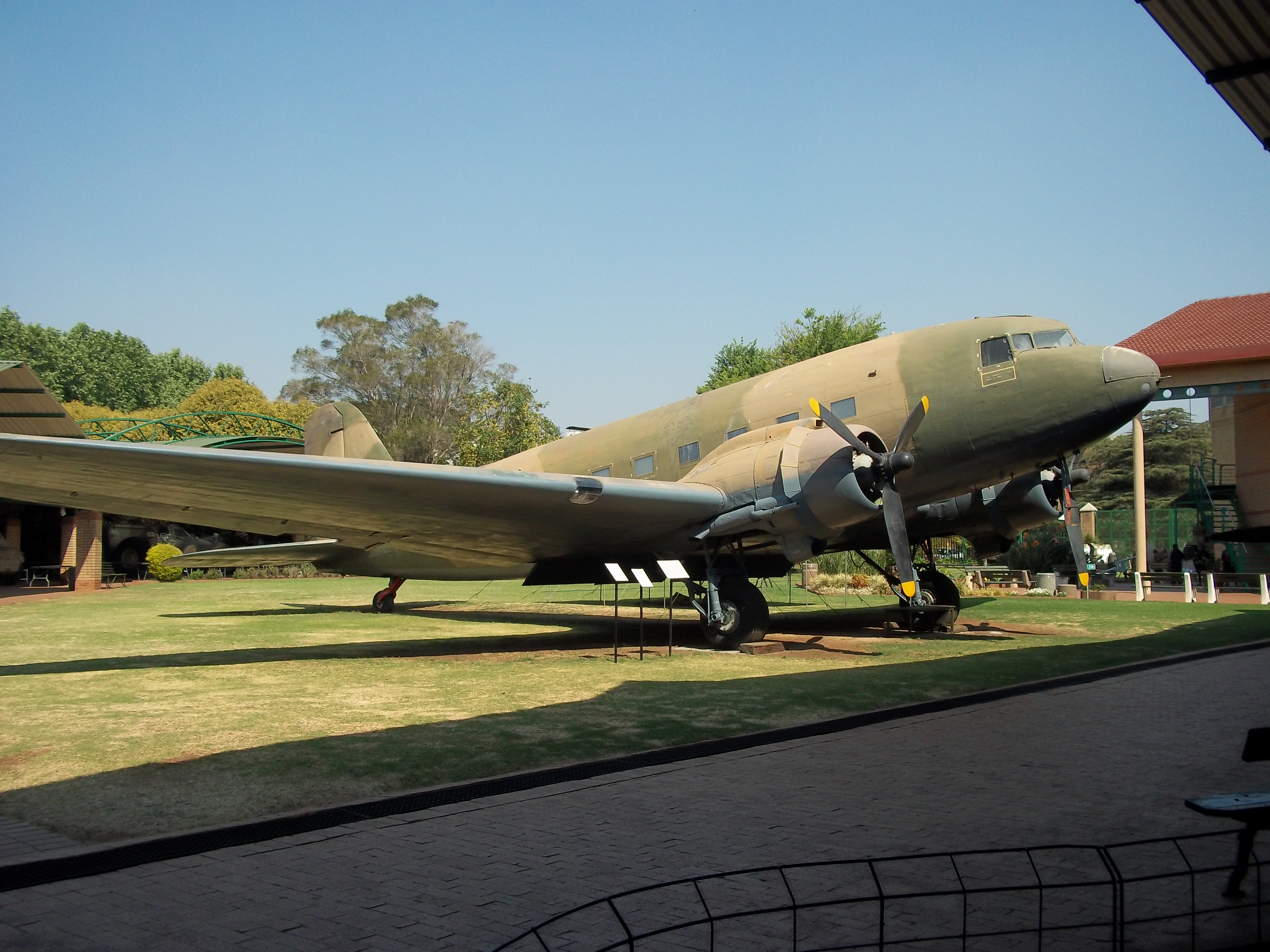
C-47 Dakota
1951-1953, 1968-1990

== Notes ==
=== References ===
- Martin, H.J. (Lt-Gen); Orpen, N.D. (1979). South Africa at War: Military and Industrial Organisation and Operations in connection with the conduct of War: 1939–1945 (South African Forces World War II: Volume VII). Cape Town: Purnell. p. 282. ISBN 0-86843-025-0.
