= 6 Squadron SAAF =

6 Squadron
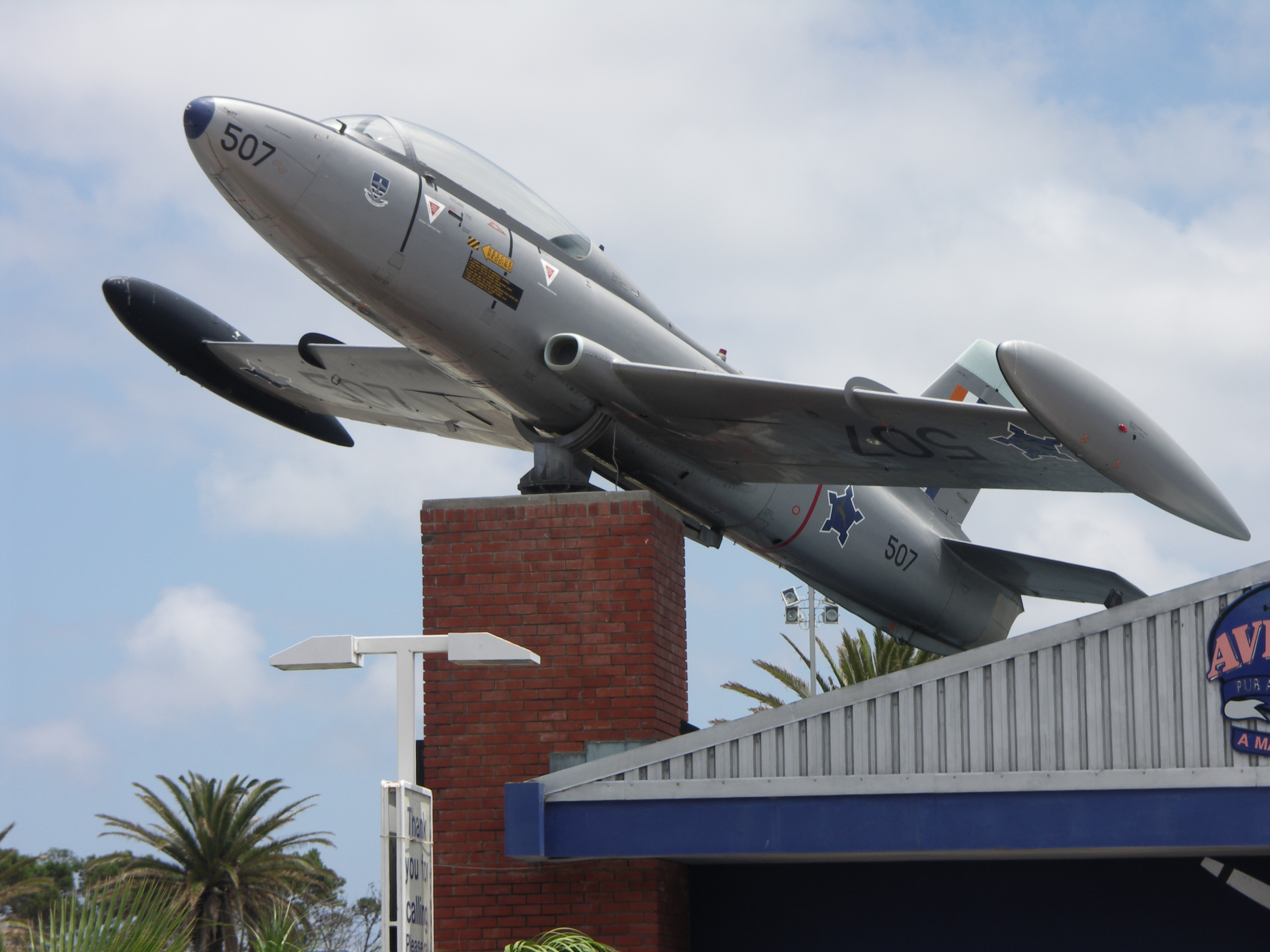
- Impala Mk1 as flown by the Squadron at the time of disbanding
- Active: 1939-1940; 1942-1943; 1952-1959; 1961-1990
- Country: (South Africa)
- Branch: South African Air Force
- Role: Maritime Patrol (WWII)
- Motto: "Pasop" (Beware)

Insignia
- Squadron crest

6 Squadron was a South African Air Force unit first formed just before World War II. It was disbanded and re-created a number of times, finally disbanding in October 1990.

The squadron was formed in Cape Town in April 1939 and was equipped with Westland Wapiti IIIs. Initial duties at the outbreak of war were those of anti-submarine coastal patrols from Youngsfield as part of Coastal Command SAAF. In February 1940, the unit was moved to Waterkloof and renumbered 1 Squadron. On 26 February 1942 it was re-formed again at Swartkop with the Curtiss Mohawk IV and moved to Stanger on the east coast and then to Eerste River in the Cape, flying Wapitis, Fairey Battles and Hawker Hartbees. The squadron was again disbanded on 31 July 1943 when the threat of a Japanese invasion of Madagascar had been circumvented by the Allied invasion of the island.

On 5 July 1952 the squadron was reformed as a citizen force unit, flying Harvards from Port Elizabeth but was again disbanded in 1959. It was resurrected in May 1961, again flying Harvards; from 1973 to 1976 the squadron flew a single Cessna 185. In March 1975 it began receiving Impala Mk Is which remained as the operational aircraft fit until the unit's final disbandment in October 1990.

== Aircraft operated ==
- Westland Wapiti IIIs
- Fairey Battles
- Hawker Hartbees
- Harvards
- Cessna 185
- Impala Mk Is
Aircraft flown by 6 Squadron
Note: Aircraft type photographs may not necessarily represent aircraft of the same mark or actual aircraft belonging to the squadron.
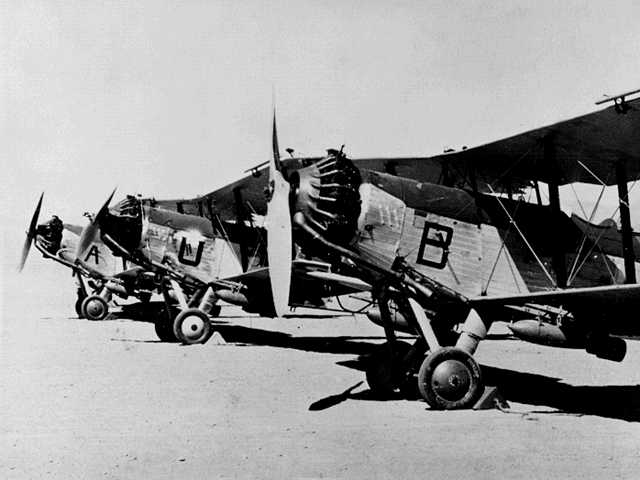
Westland Wapiti
1939-1940, 1942-1943

Curtiss Mohawk IV
1942-1943

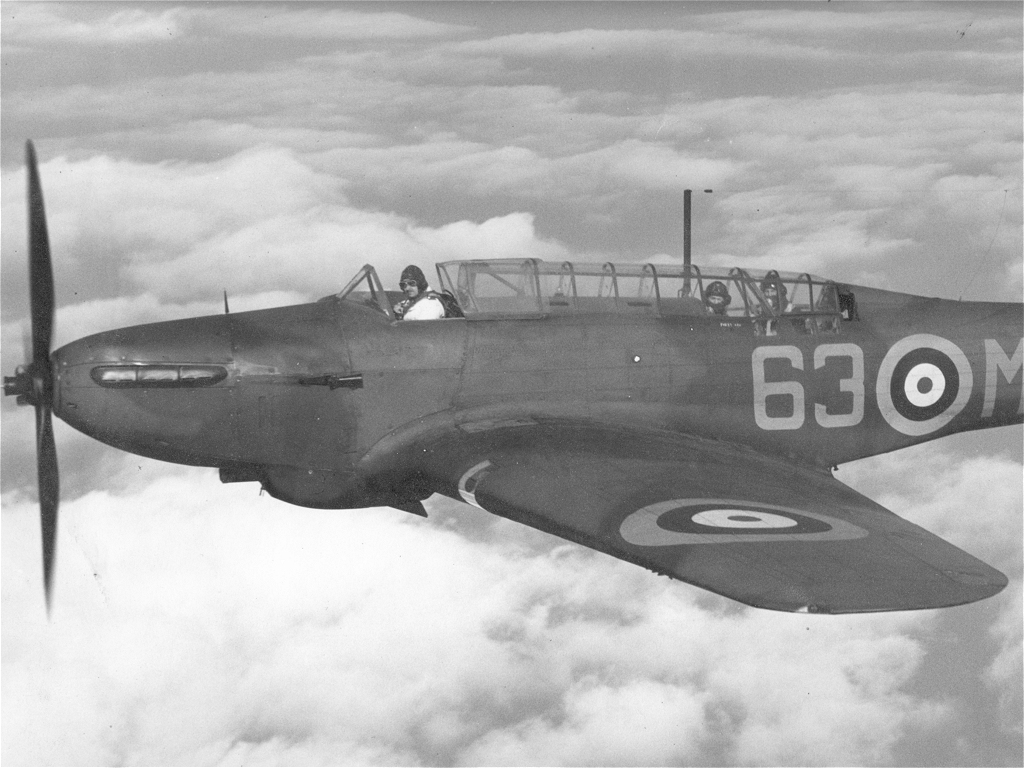
Fairey Battle
1942-1943

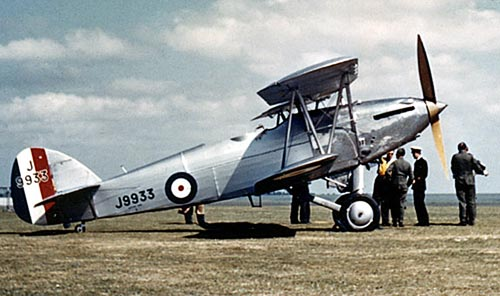
Hawker Hartbees
1942-1943

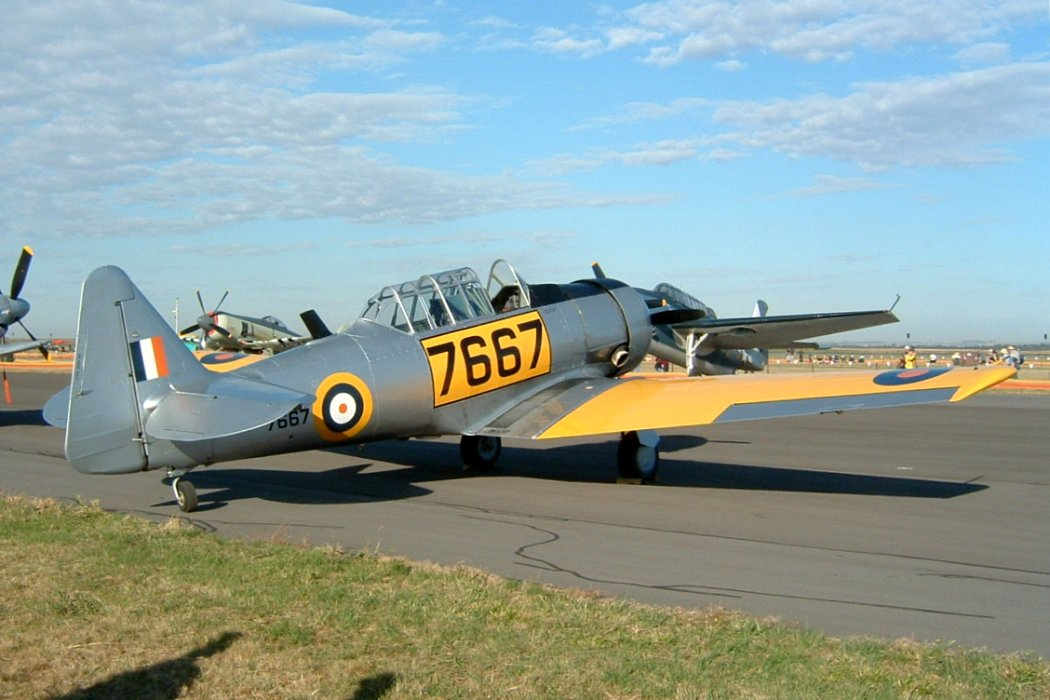
North American T-6 Harvard
1952-1959, 1961-1973

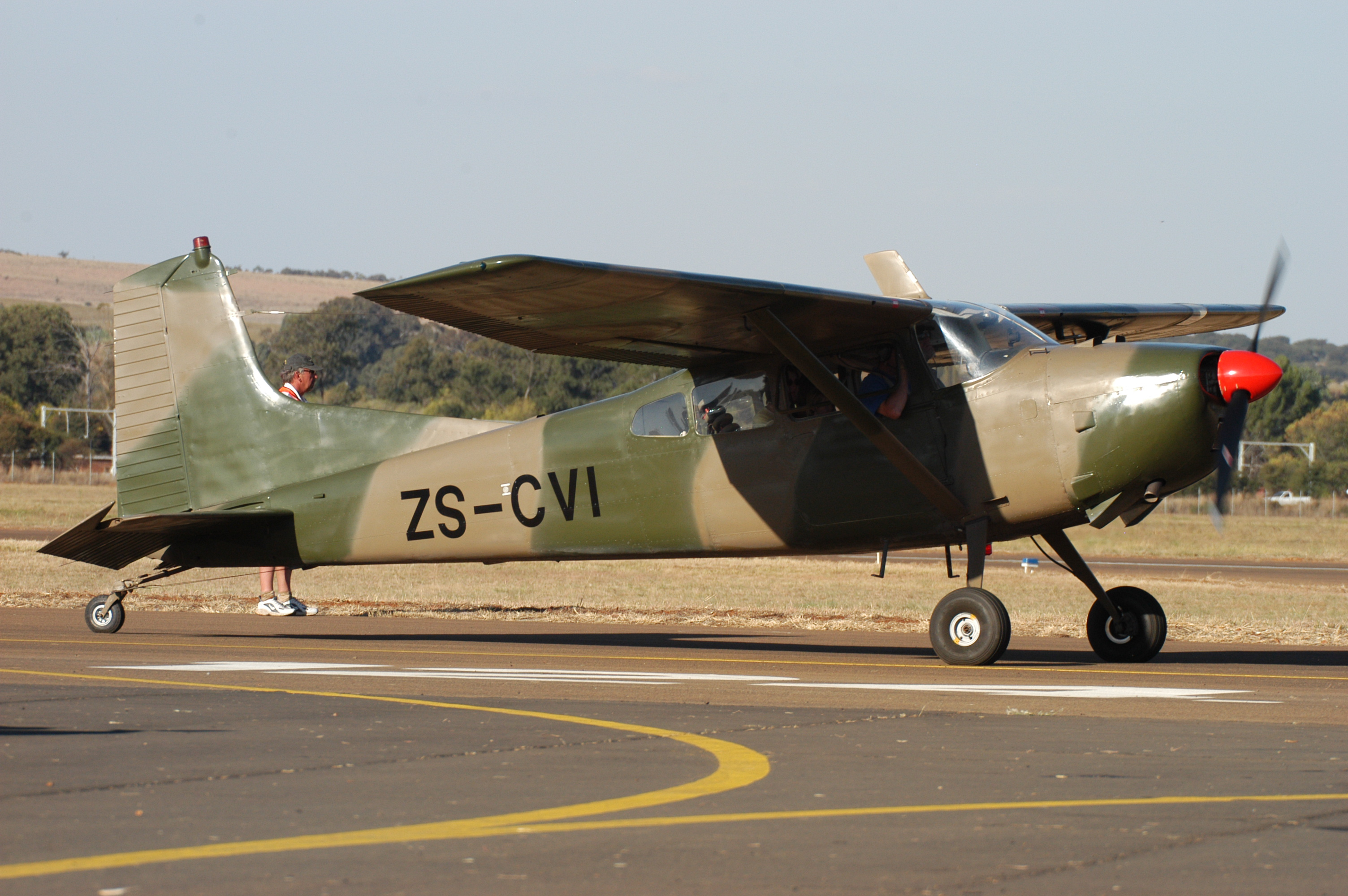
Cessna 185
1973-1976

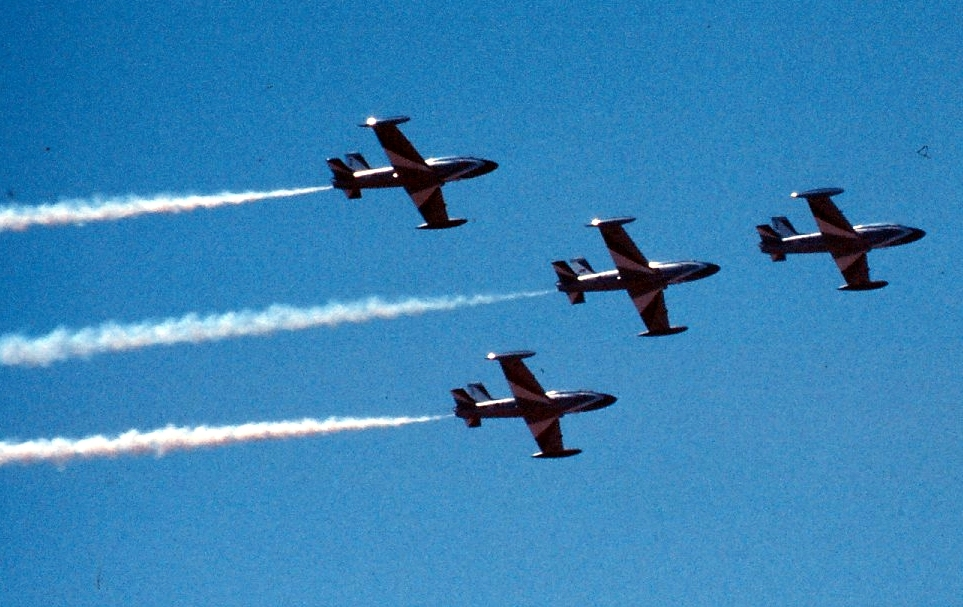
Atlas Impala Mk.I
1975-1990
