= 30 Squadron SAAF =

30 Squadron
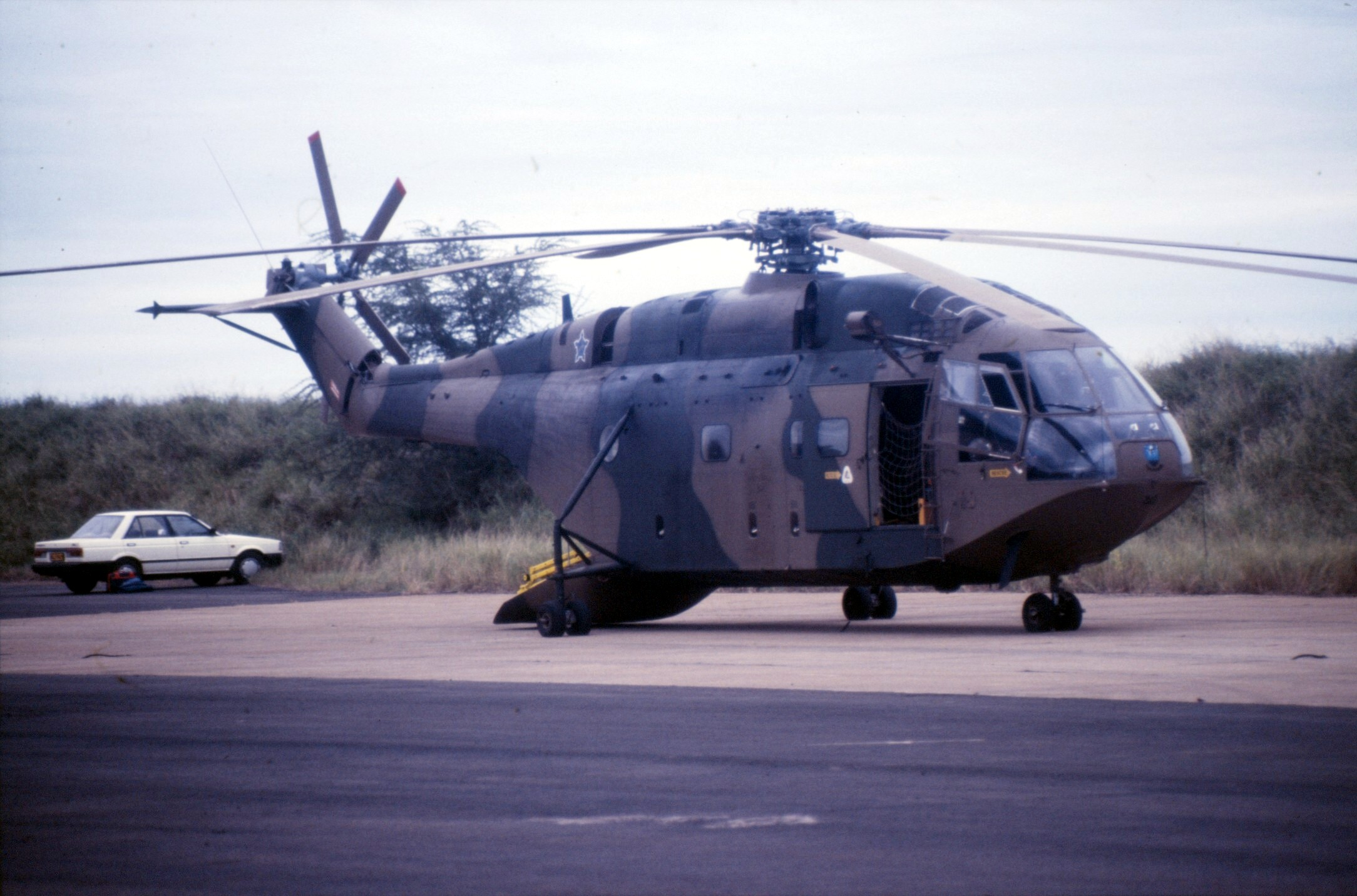
- A SAAF Super Frelon as flown by 30 Squadron
- Active: 1944-1945; 1980-1991
- Country: South Africa
- Branch: South African Air Force
- Type: Medium Bomber (1944-1945); Med Helicopter Transport (1980-1991)
- Motto(s): "Summa Agilitas" (The highest agility / Unequaled Versatility)

Insignia
- Identification Symbol: 1944-1945: T
- 30 Squadron Insignia

30 Squadron SAAF was a squadron of the South African Air Force. It was established in 1944 and saw service as a medium bomber squadron in Italy during the Second World War. After the war, the squadron was disbanded and was resurrected in 1980 as a medium transport helicopter squadron – a role it retained until it was finally disbanded in 1991.

== History ==
30 Squadron was originally constituted as No. 223 Squadron RAF and was established when 223 Squadron was re-designated as 30 Squadron SAAF at Pescara in Italy on 12 August 1944. While designated as No. 223 Squadron RAF, the unit had been based in Kenya from 1935 flying Gordons, Vincents and Wellesleys in a peacetime role. At the outbreak of war, it was deployed in support of the East African campaign until April 1941 when the squadron was transferred to Egypt as a training unit for converting crews to Blenheims, Marylands, Bostons and Baltimores. It resumed operations as a bomber unit in May and was then moved to Libya after the battle of El Alamein, then to Tunisia in April 1943, and to Malta in July 1943. By the end of September, 223 Squadron was operating as part of 3 Wing SAAF from southern Italy in an interdiction role until its transfer to the SAAF in July 1944, operating B26 Marauders. Once converted to 30 Squadron SAAF, the unit was placed under command of 3 Wing SAAF.

The new SAAF squadron flew its Martin Marauders from the original RAF base at Pescara and moved to Jesi in October 1944, concentrating on raids against communications and railway links in Yugoslavia and Northern Italy. Operations continued until 15 October when the squadron was withdrawn from action for one month, resuming operations on 22 November 1944. The last operational flight occurred during April 1945 and the squadron was withdrawn from operations on 3 May 1945. After the end of hostilities in Italy, the squadron was used in a transport role, being transferred to Biferno in June 1945 and was disbanded on 15 July 1945.

The squadron was re-established on 8 December 1980 at AFB Ysterplaat when 'A' Flight of 15 Squadron, flying Super Frelon and Puma helicopters was re-designated as 30 Squadron. It was also assigned two civilian SA 330J Puma's owned by the Department of Environmental Affairs for Antarctic support missions. In January 1986 all Super Frelon helicopters were transferred to 15 Squadron and the squadron continued flying Pumas until 31 December 1991 when these aircraft were transferred to 22 Squadron and 30 Squadron was disbanded for the last time.

== Aircraft ==
Aircraft flown by 30 Squadron
Note: Aircraft type photographs may not necessarily represent aircraft of the same mark or actual aircraft belonging to the squadron.
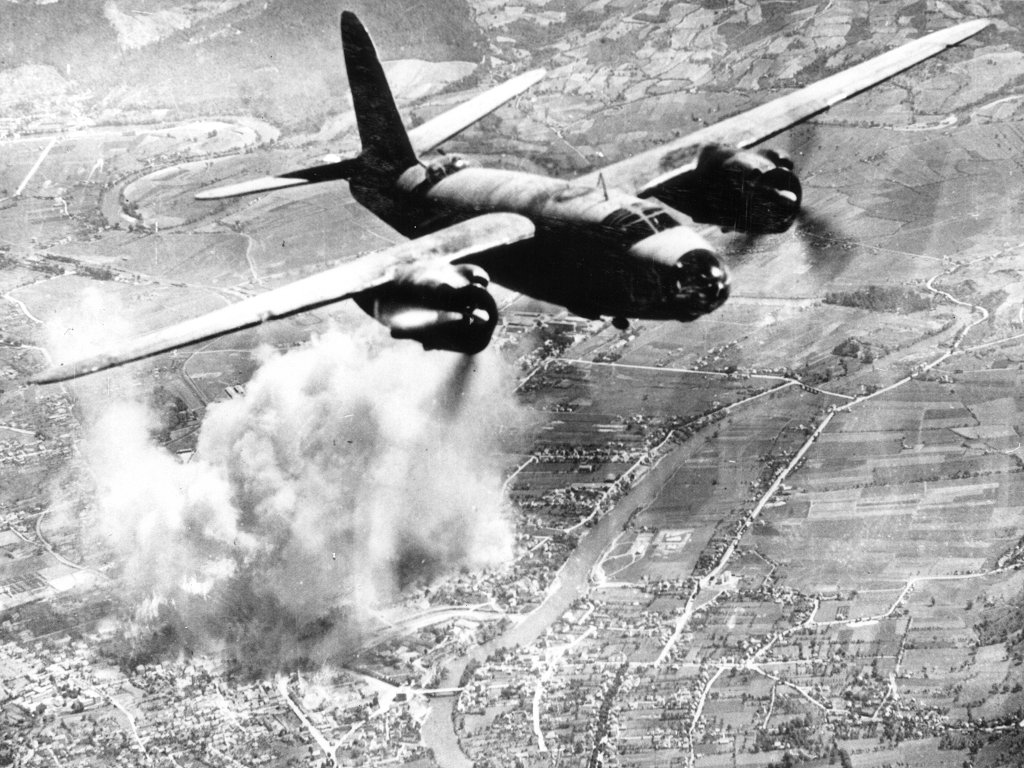
B-26 Marauder
1944-1945

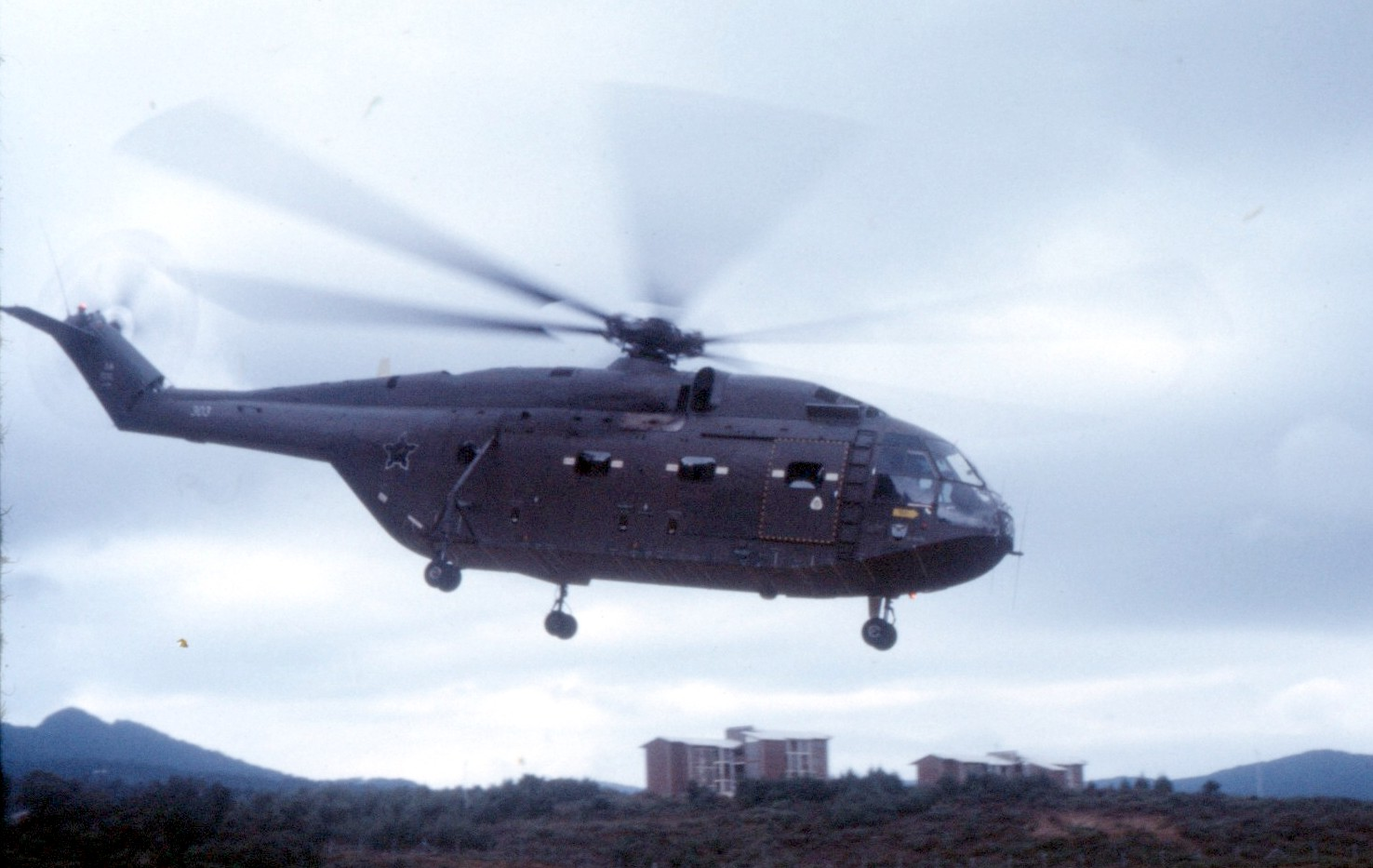
Super Frelon
1980-1986

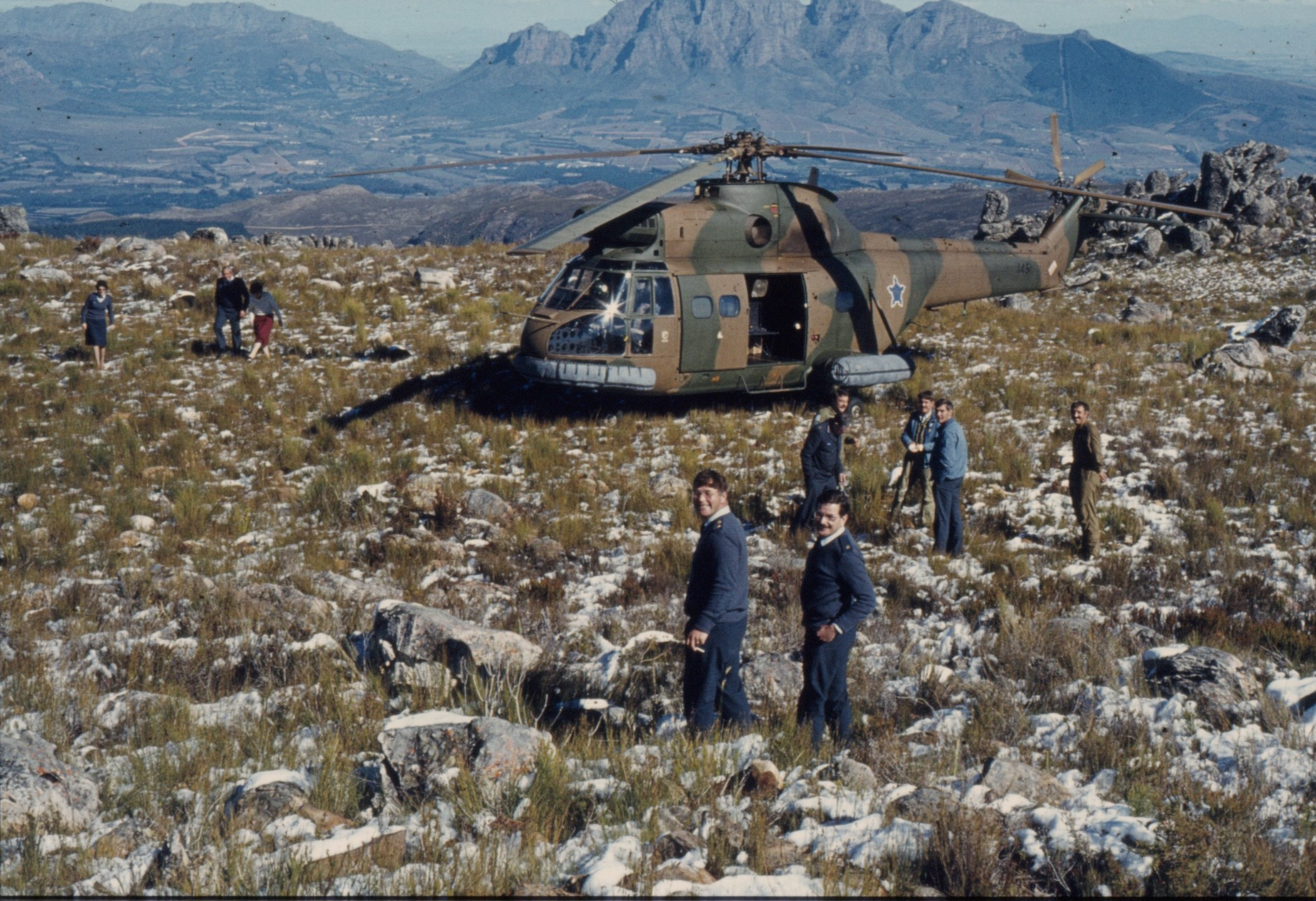
Puma
1980-1991
