= Operation Wishbone =

- Part of the South African Border War
- Location: Operation Wishbone (Angola)
- Planned by: SAAF
- Objective: Air attack by the SAAF against a PLAN bases inside southern Angola.
- Date: 19 December 1980

Operation Wishbone was a military operation in Angola during December 1980 by the South African Defence Force (SADF) and South African Air Force (SAAF) during the Angolan Civil War and South African Border War.

== Background ==
The mission called for mid-level bombing attacks by the South African Air Force (SAAF) against SWAPO's PLAN bases in Angola at Oshiheng near Ongiva and Palele close to Xangongo. Four formations of aircraft were assembled at either airbases at Grootfontein or Ondangwa in Namibia/South West Africa. The aircraft formations consisted of either four Buccaneers or Mirage F1's and one lead aircraft, a Canberra bomber. The Canberra bomber would signal when the bombs would be dropped on the target. The operation took place 19 December 1980.

== Aftermath ==
Intelligence gathered after the attack proved that the bombing at the height chosen had been inaccurate and that the PLAN bases were unoccupied during the attack.
