= 22 Squadron SAAF =

South Africa airforce squad

22 Squadron
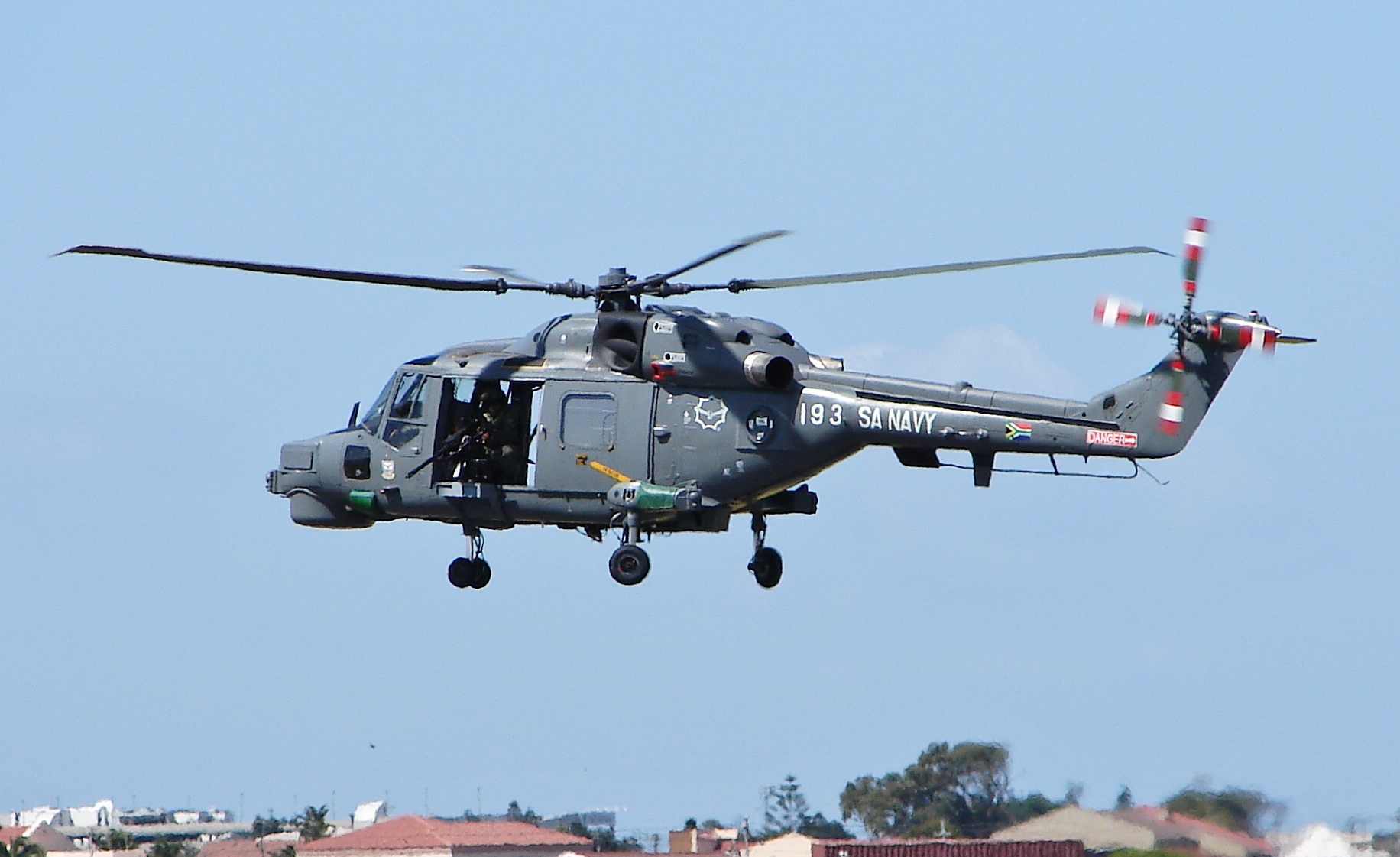
- AgustaWestland Super Lynx 300 Mk.64
- Active: 1 July 1942–present
- Country: South Africa
- Branch: South African Air Force
- Role: Maritime helicopter squadron
- Garrison/HQ: AFB Ysterplaat
- Motto: Ut Mare Liberum Sit (That the Seas may be Free)
- Colors: 1942–1945 East African coast, 1944–1945 Gibraltar, 1945 Egypt
- Equipment: Atlas Oryx M2, Westland Super Lynx 300

Commanders
- Officer Commanding: Lt Col K.G Jonker
- 2IC: Lt Col A.R. Senoamadi
- Squadron Warrant Officer: WO2 L. Mhambi

Insignia
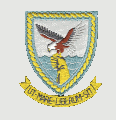
- 22 Sqn Badge

22 Squadron is a squadron of the South African Air Force. It is currently a maritime helicopter squadron operating Lynx and Oryx helicopters for the South African Navy. Originally formed in 1942, the squadron is the only current maritime helicopter squadron of the SAAF. It has been involved with many rescues, some gaining international attention as well as arctic base support.

== History ==
The squadron was formed in Durban on 1 July 1942 by renaming 31 Flight to 22 (Torpedo-Bomber-Reconnaissance) Squadron. It was equipped with ex-SAA Junkers Ju 86s as well as a number of Avro Ansons, and was assigned to anti-submarine, coastal reconnaissance and convoy support duties.

It had a relatively unremarkable period of duty in World War II, being engaged mainly in coastal patrols as part of Coastal Command SAAF. In mid 1945 it was flying Lockheed Venturas from Gibraltar, under the control of AHQ Malta at Valletta, but it left for home in July. It was disbanded at Idku in Egypt on 24 October 1945. Following the war, it was briefly recreated in 1954 and equipped with Lockheed Venturas, but disbanded again soon thereafter.

The latest chapter in the squadron's history began on 1 January 1964, when it was recreated at AFB Ysterplaat as 22 Flight and equipped with the newly delivered Westland Wasp helicopter, becoming a full squadron in May 1976. In 1978, it received a complement of Aérospatiale Alouette IIIs.

At the end of the 1980s, the Westland Wasps were withdrawn from service, but the squadron received a number of Aérospatiale Pumas in 1991 when it was amalgamated with 31 Squadron. The Pumas were later replaced with the Atlas Oryx M2.

This squadron is the sole maritime helicopter squadron of the SAAF, and therefore provides all helicopters, air and ground crew for operation aboard South African Navy vessels. It has previously been tasked with supporting South Africa's Antarctic research station, and therefore operated two specially modified Atlas Oryx M2 helicopters, suitable for use in the extreme conditions. One of the M2s was written off after a crash landing in July 2004.

Wasp helicopters from the squadron were involved in the rescue of South African Navy personnel in the South Atlantic following the sinking of the SAS President Kruger in 1982. The squadron also gained international recognition in 2002 during the high-profile rescue of the Magdalena Oldendorff which was trapped in the Antarctic ice. 22 Squadron's two Oryx M2s were embarked aboard the S. A. Agulhas for the successful operation.

Apart from official military support the squadron is involved in mountain rescue and air-sea rescue operations, fire fighting, crime prevention and humanitarian relief in the event of disasters.

The squadron's Alouette IIIs were retired in August 2007. The first of four Westland Super Lynx 300 helicopters for use aboard the South African Navy's new Valour class frigates, was delivered on 13 July 2007. It was accompanied to AFB Ysterplaat on its first flight in South Africa by two Oryx and an Alouette III.

== Previous aircraft operated ==
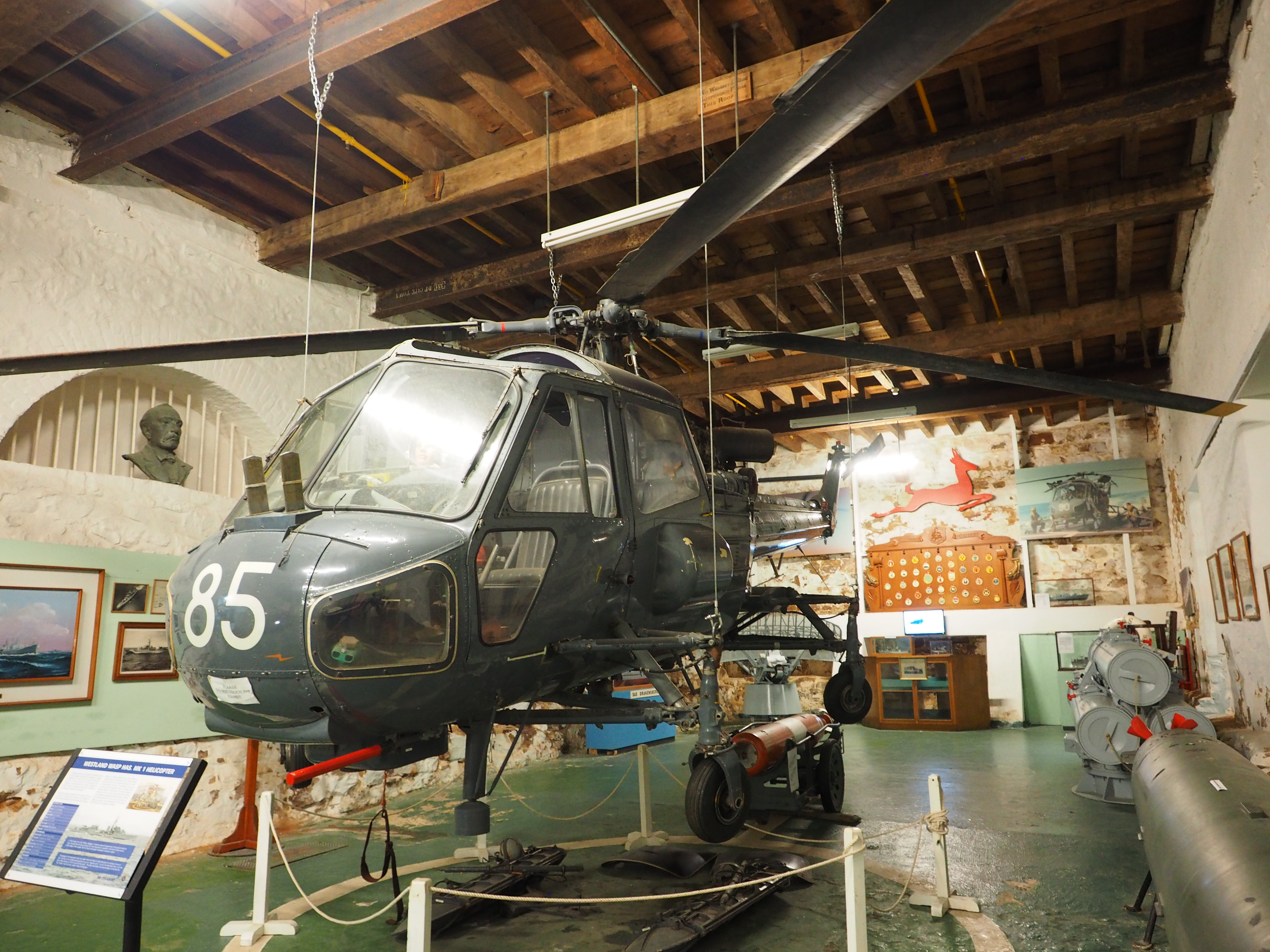
A former 22 Squadron Wasp helicopter on display at the South African Naval Museum

- Junkers Ju 86
- Avro Anson
- Lockheed Ventura
- Westland Wasp
- Aérospatiale SA 330 Puma

== See also ==
- SAS President Kruger
