= Walter Fischer (politician) =

Austrian physician and journalist (1901–1978)

Walter Fischer, during the Spanish Civil War

Walter Fischer (6 January 1901 – 28 April 1978) was an Austrian medical doctor, journalist, radio broadcaster, translator, poet, anti-fascist resistance fighter and Communist Party official.

== Youth and student years ==
He was born on 6 January 1901 in Sankt Pölten, the son of Josef Fischer. He went to school in Graz, and in 1919 he began medical studies in the same city. In 1920 he joined the Social Democratic Workers Party and the local Association of Socialist Students in Graz (of which he was chairman 1921-1923). When the Association of Socialist Students of Austria was founded he became a member of the new organization. Between 1922 and 1923 he was the student affairs editor of the social democratic newspaper Arbeiterwille. During 1923-1924 he worked for the Austrian Association of Settlement and Small Gardens, and educated at summer camps of Reichsverein Kinderfreunde. He graduated from medical school in 1926. He married Magda Schacherl in 1927. The couple had one daughter.

Around 1930 Fischer and his brothers Ernst (editor of Arbeiterwille) and Otto were part of the 'Kreis in der Morellenfeldgasse', a group of left-wing intellectuals in Graz - along with individuals like Goldy Matthèy, Ferdinand Bilger, Maria Biljan-Bilger, Karl Drews, Wolfgang Benndorf, Axl Leskoschek, Herbert Eichholzer, Thomas Ring and others.

== Medical career in Vienna ==
Between 1926 and 1931 Fischer worked as assistant physician at the Vienna General Hospital. Between 1931 and 1934 he worked as a physician at the Workers Health Insurance in Favoriten (the 10th District of Vienna). He was a member of the Association of Social Democratic Physicians in Vienna 1927 and 1934.

== February Uprising, imprisonment and joining the Communist Party ==
During the 1934 February Uprising, Fischer led the Schutzbund forces at Laaer Berg along with Josef Brüll. When the uprising was defeated Fischer was arrested and sentenced to six months of imprisonment. He was detained at the Wöllersdorf prison camp between 12 August – 19 December 1934. He joined the Communist Party of Austria and built a communist study group among other inmates at the camp.

== Exile ==
He fled to Czechoslovakia in January 1935. Fischer and his family travelled with a small group of other Austrian communists from Czechoslovakia towards the Soviet Union via Poland. They reached Moscow in February 1935.

In Moscow he learnt Russian. He worked as a physician at the Clara Zetkin Maternity Hospital in Moscow, and later at a village hospital in Volga German ASSR.

== International Brigades ==
Fischer arrived in Spain in November, using the pseudonym 'Alexander Langer'. He was part of the International Medical Service of the International Brigades. He served as the Brigade Physician of at the frontline hospital XI International Brigade, and later as the Head Physician of the XV International Brigade. In the fall of 1937 he was named Head Physician of the Base Hospital of the International Brigades in Albacete. In May 1938 he was appointed as the Head Physician of the Spanish Third Division. In January 1939, after the formal demobilization of the International Brigades, he was assigned the role of War Commissar in the XI International Brigade.

== Back in the Soviet Union ==
In France Fischer was recognized as an 'Ex-Austrian' refugee. In May 1939 he moved back to the Soviet Union. In Moscow he was involved in a proposition to launch an Austrian broadcast on Radio Moscow, but the project was shelved following the Soviet-German pact. Following the German attack on the Soviet Union, Fischer was evacuated to Sverdlovsk in August 1941, where he set up German-language radio broadcast. In February 1942 he returned to Moscow where he was provisionally placed in charge of the German-language radio broadcasts. In June 1942 he was put in charge of the Austrian broadcasts of Radio Moscow. At the Austrian broadcast of Radio Moscow he acted as the news editor, translator and reader.

In Moscow Fischer translated an unpublished section of Maxim Gorky's My Universities and Mikhail Lermontov's poem The Novice. The translations were published in the August-September 1945 issue of Internationalen Literatur.

== Return to Austria ==
Fischer returned to Austria in October 1945, after the Central Committee of the Communist Party of the Soviet Union gave him permission to leave the country. In Austria he worked as party official of the Communist Party. Between 1946 and 1951 he was the District Chairman of the Communist Party in Favoriten. In 1950 he was included in the Central Committee of the party. He was the Lower Austria State Chairman of the Austrian-Soviet Friendship Society 1950-1951. Between 1951 and 1956 he headed the Agricultural Department of the Central Committee of the Communist Party of Austria.

== Styria party boss ==
Fischer became the Styria state chairman of the Communist Party in 1956. At the time the Styria party organization was undergoing an profound internal crisis in the wake of the Soviet intervention in Hungary. Fischer was the first non-Styrian leader to be put in charge of the state party organization since the legalization of the party in 1945. During his tenure conflicts in the organization persisted. On 8 December 1958 Franz Leitner was elected as the new Styria state chairman of the Communist Party, as Fischer didn't run for re-election for health reasons.

== Later years ==
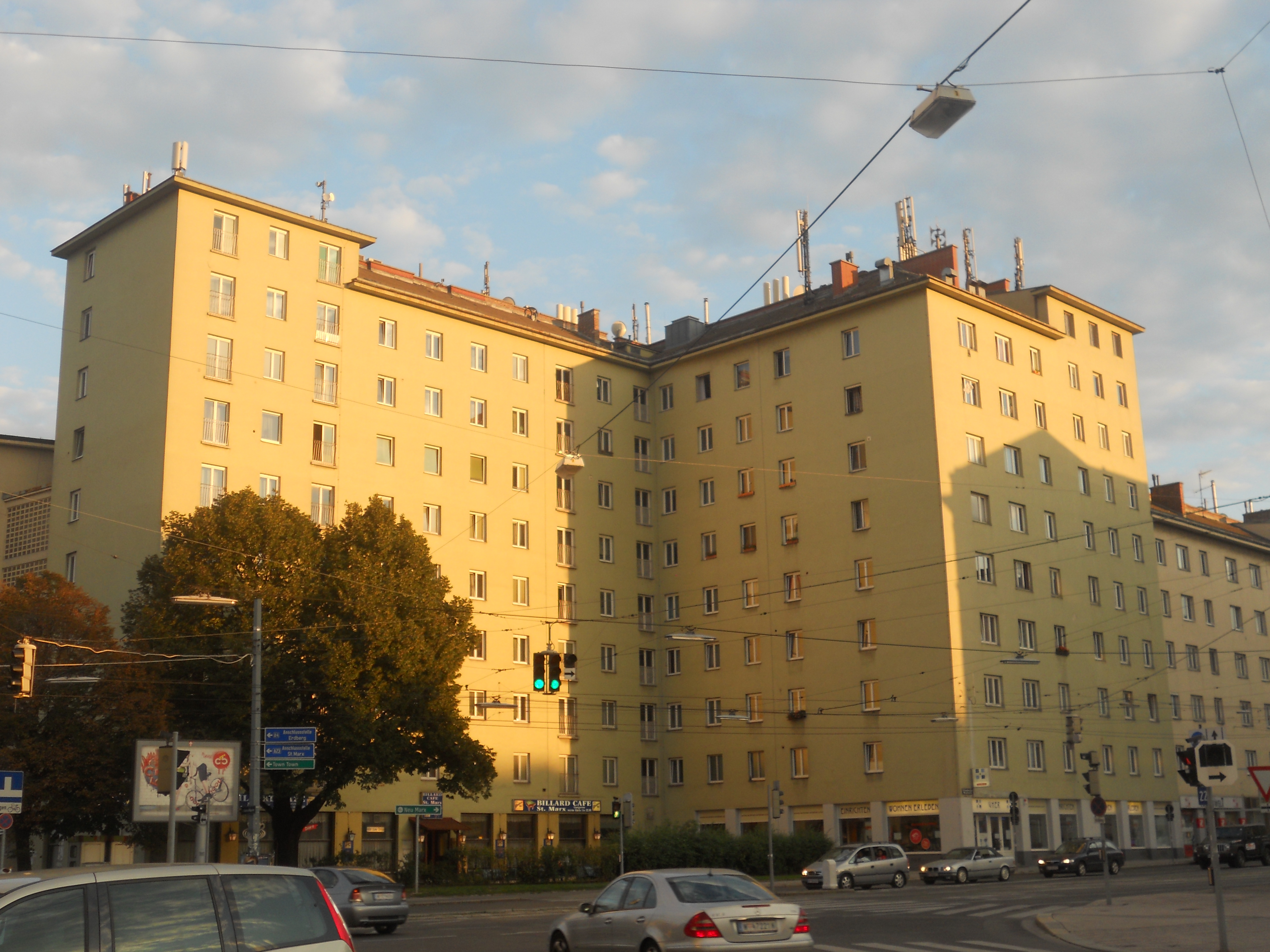
'Maderspergerhof' building in Vienna, where Fischer lived during his later years

From the beginning of the 1960s he spent a lot of time translating Russian poetry, translating works of poets like Yevgeny Yevtushenko, Andrei Voznesensky, Aleksandr Tvardovsky, Robert Rozhdestvensky and Sergei Yesenin. Some of these translation would appear in Wiener Tagebuch and Volksstimme (the central KPÖ organ). Fischer reached out to Stephan Hermlin, after which his translations were published in the East German magazine Sinn und Form in 1964. From 1966 onwards Fischer was a member of the editorial board of Wiener Tagebuch.

Between 1959 and 1968 he was the editor of Der kleine Landwirt and headed the Educational Political Commission of the Central Committee of KPÖ. He remained a member of the Central Committee of KPÖ until 1964. Fischer opposed the Soviet intervention in Czechoslovakia in 1968. In response to the shift in KPÖ in 1971-1972, as the party reversed its initial condemnation of the Soviet intervention in Czechoslovakia and adopted a more pro-Moscow line, Fischer left the party.

During his later years he lived in the 'Maderspergerhof' building in Vienna. Walter Fischer died in Vienna on 28 April 1978. In 1986 an autobiographical work, Kurze Geschichten aus einem langen Leben ('Short stories from a long life'), was published posthumously.
