= Aermacchi MB-326 =

Trainer aircraft family by Aermacchi

MB-326
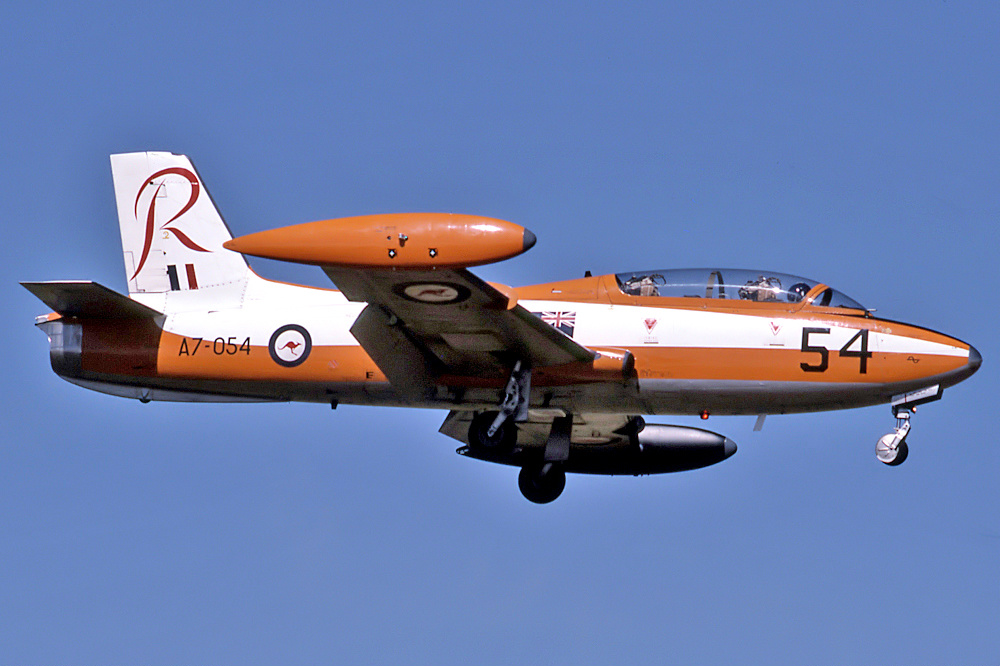
- RAAF Aermacchi MB-326H in 1986

General information
- Type: Advanced trainer/Light attack
- National origin: Italy
- Manufacturer: Aermacchi
- Status: Limited service
- Primary users: Italian Air Force South African Air Force; Brazilian Air Force; Royal Australian Air Force
- Number built: ~800

History
- Manufactured: 1961–1975
- Introduction date: February 1962
- First flight: 10 December 1957
- Developed into: Aermacchi MB-339

The Aermacchi or Macchi MB-326 is a light military jet trainer designed and produced by the Italian aircraft manufacturer Aermacchi. It is one of the most commercially successful aircraft of its type, being bought by more than 10 countries and produced under licence in Australia, Brazil and South Africa.

The MB-326 was developed during a period when "all-through" jet training was considered by many air forces to be the most cost-effective model for training of military pilots. Accordingly, Aermacchi designed it as a single type of aircraft that could readily perform both elementary and advanced training right through to a near combat-ready standard. After it was proposed during the 1950s, the Italian Air Force (AMI) quickly became interested in the MB-326, and an initial contract to produce three prototypes was issued following a competition. Several design refinements were made prior to the AMI, giving its official approval of the project during 1956. On 10 December 1957, the first prototype performed its maiden flight. On 15 December 1958, the Italian government ordered 15 pre-series aircraft; further orders soon followed.

During February 1962, the MB-326 formally entered service with the AMI. Operational experience with the type demonstrated that the advantages of operating just one type for all training purposes, being simplicity and economy of scale, were usually outweighed by the disadvantages, namely the higher purchase and operating costs of a large all-jet training fleet. Many operators therefore soon switched to operating the MB-326 in conjunction with a cheaper piston-engined type for basic training purposes. Over time, the MB-326 found its primary role as a lead-in trainer to prepare pilots for transition to very high performance fighter aircraft. It set many category records, including an altitude record of 56,807 ft (17,315 m) on 18 March 1966. While the majority of operators were military, some civil organisations also flew the type; Italy's national flag carrier Alitalia conducted pilot training using a handful of MB-326s.

In excess of 800 MB-326s were built between 1961 and 1975. Brazil was the biggest export customer for the MB-326, which included its produced under licence by Embraer. Licensed production of the type was also performed by Atlas Aircraft Corporation of South Africa. While the MB-326 had been originally conceived as a two-seat trainer, multiple single and two-seat light attack versions were also developed. Armed MB-326 saw combat, the South African Defence Force opting to employ the type during the South African Border War against the People's Armed Forces for the Liberation of Angola (FAPLA) and Cuban expeditionary troops in Angola between 1975 and 1989.

== Development ==
=== Origins ===
During the 1950s, a number of countries began to operate compact jet-powered trainer aircraft that possessed similar performance to frontline operational aircraft, often having been produced as two-seat adaptions of these aircraft. Recognising the potential to better fulfil this role, several different companies independently chose to commence the development of purpose-built aircraft to serve as trainers; these included the French Fouga Magister, the American Cessna T-37 Tweet, the British Jet Provost, and the Czechoslovak Aero L-29. In the aftermath of the devastating Second World War, Italy spent a number of years recuperating and reestablishing its economy; as such, the nation found itself unable to prioritise the necessary financing for the independent development of high-end combat aircraft that would be competitive with the upcoming generation of supersonic interceptors or bombers; accordingly, Italian aviation company Aermacchi elected to instead focus its resources and development efforts upon the production of a line of light fighters and trainer aircraft.

What would become the MB-326 had its origins in a private venture project by Macchi; it was developed by a team headed by Italian aeronautical engineer Ermanno Bazzocchi, the company's technical director and chief engineer. Reportedly, Bazzocchi had considered many different configurations for the tentative trainer before the design team chose to proceed with a single-engined design. In accordance with its intended primary use, the airframe was a robust and light all-metal structure, being relatively simple and cheap to construct and to maintain. The design was also to be powered by the British Armstrong Siddeley Viper turbojet engine, an efficient powerplant for the time. The Viper engine had been originally designed as a short-life unit destined for use upon disposable target drones, however, the engine had shown itself to be far more reliable and useful in other roles. During 1954, initial representations by Bazzocchi were made to the Italian Air Ministry. During 1953, the designed airframe and engine combination led to Macchi formally launching the MB-326 programme.

Around the time of the programme's launch, the Italian Air Force took interest in the proposed aircraft. The service was considering options for the potential replacement of its existing trainer fleet, thus, upon the commissioning of a competition to select a suitable successor, the MB-326 was an obvious early entrant. A detailed specification was released for the competition, the requirements stated included a maximum load of 7 g when flown at the maximum weight, a lifespan of 5,000 flight hours, an interval of at least 50–60 hours between servicing, ample warning in advance of stalls (to be at least 15 km/h (9 mph) above the aircraft's stall speed), the ability to take-off at maximum weight in 800 m (2,625 ft) over a 15 m (50 ft) high obstacle (or 500 m (1,640 ft) when flown at a light weight), being able to land within 450 m (1,480 ft) at minimum weight, a minimum speed of 110/130 km/h and a maximum speed of 700 km/h, a rate of climb at least 15 m/s (2,950 ft/min), and an endurance time of at least three hours at 3,000 m (9,840 ft).

Interest in the proposed MB-326 led to the award of the development contract for three prototypes. The programme was subject to significant refinement around this stage, leading to several modifications being made. Amongst these changes was the elimination of the negative dihedral angle previously present on the horizontal tail surfaces and the substitution of a pair of wing-based airbrakes into one located at a ventral position. During 1956, the AMI gave its official approval of the project and issued a request for the production of a pair of prototypes (later designated as MM.571 and MM.572) as well as a single airframe for static tests. These prototypes were not intended to include several features, such as the ability to equip and deploy armaments or refinements such as cabin pressurization, however, Bazzocchi chose to introduce them regardless.

=== Into flight ===
On 10 December 1957, the first prototype performed its maiden flight, flown by Macchi's chief test pilot Guido Carestiato. This prototype, designated as I-MAKI, was first publicly demonstrated over France. During its flight test programme, the MB-326 prototypes demonstrated highly favourable flight characteristics of the design; however, several of the modifications made had negatively affected the overall weight of the aircraft; allegedly, at one stage, the excess weight was 400 kg (880 lb) greater than that given in the initial estimates. The original Viper 8 engine was capable of producing 7.8 kN (1,750 lbf) of thrust; to address the increased weight, the more powerful Viper 9 model was adopted instead, which was capable of generating 0.7 kN (147 lbf) more thrust.

On 22 September 1958, the first prototype was joined by the similarly configured second prototype. It did feature some differences from the earlier aircraft; chiefly, it was powered by a newer model of the Viper engine, the Viper 11, which had been rated to produce 11.1 kN thrust (1,134 kgf, 2,500 lbf). The Viper 11 would be the same standard of engine used on subsequent production standard aircraft. Direct competition to the MB-326 came in the form of the Fiat G.80; this aircraft was both more powerful and was the first real Italian jet, having flown five years earlier. However, the G.80 had several disadvantages, including being heavier, considerably larger and more expensive than its rival; as such, it ultimately lost the trainer contest and remained without a market.

On 15 December 1958, having been suitably impressed, the Italian government placed an order for a batch of 15 pre-series examples on behalf of the AMI. A production line was established at Macchi's facility in Masnago, Varese, Northern Italy. Shortly thereafter, the AMI issued its first order for the MB-326 for an initial group of 50 production standard aircraft. During 1960, a larger follow-on order for 100 aircraft was received by Macchi; this sizable commitment was viewed as being a major step towards establishing the company's supremacy in jet trainer market.

== Design ==
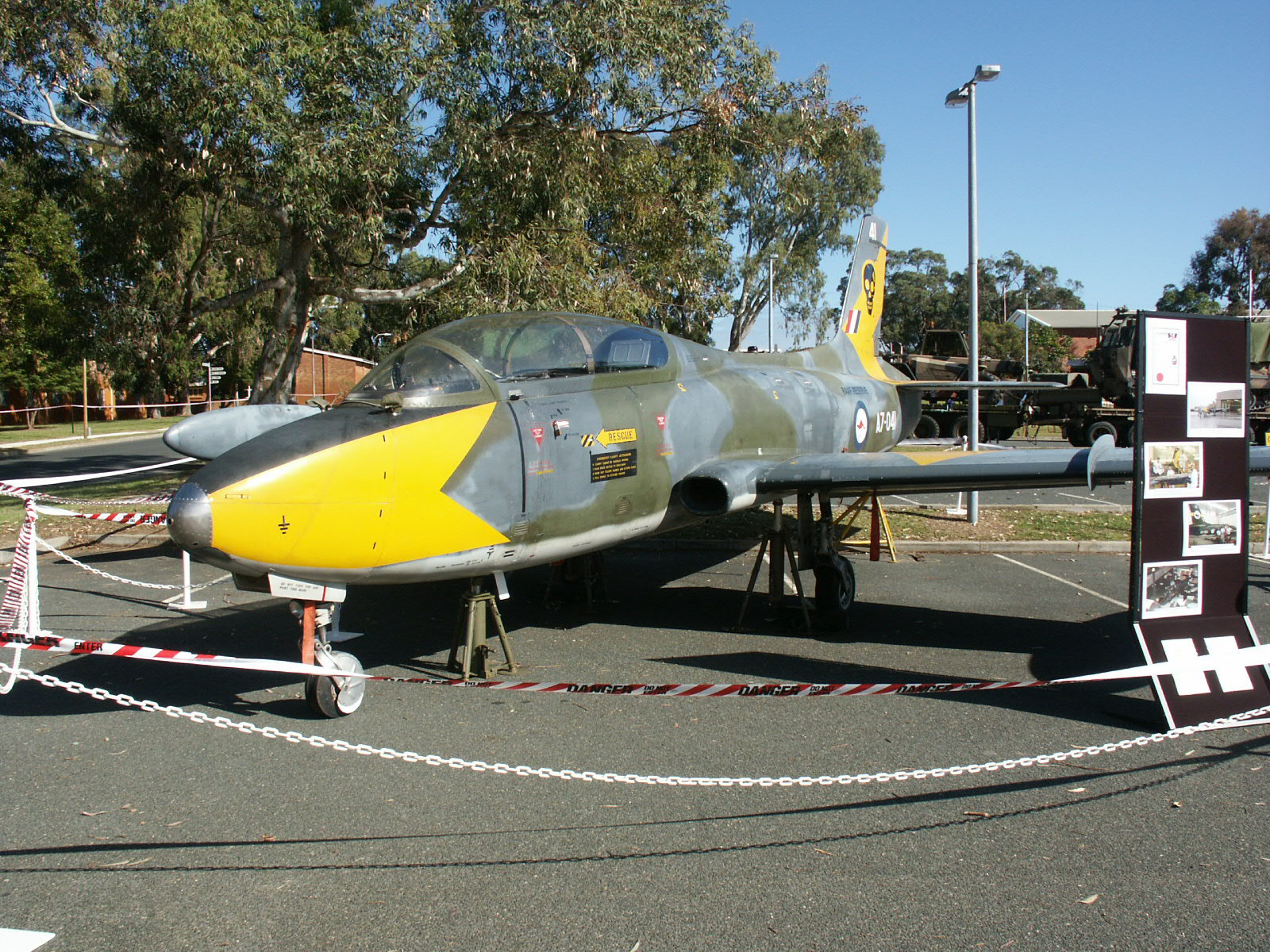
RAAF Macchi MB-326 A7-041

The Aermacchi MB-326 was a low-wing monoplane with an all-metal structure composed of light alloys. It was one of the first jet trainers to be developed with the aim of catering to both for ab initio and advanced instruction. As originally developed, the MB-326 functioned as a refined but simple aircraft capable of covering the considerably wide range of performance characteristics required to cover both ab initio training and advanced instruction alike; other major characteristics of the type included the capacity to deliver a high rate of utilization in conjunction with minimised servicing and maintenance requirements. According to Flight International, the type was suitable for the teaching of the majority of advanced flying techniques. In addition to being relatively easy to fly, a high degree of safety was also intentionally built into it, including adoption of new Martin-Baker-built ejection seats.

The MB-326 was powered by a single Rolls-Royce Viper non-afterburning turbojet engine, initial production aircraft were powered by the Viper 11 model, capable of generating up to 2,500 lb of thrust. The engine possessed multiple favourable attributes, including its general simplicity and robustness, relatively low revolutions per minute (RPM) and turbine entry temperature (TET), rapid acceleration, ease of installation, and its somewhat forgiving nature to mishandling in the air by students. Air was provided to the engine via a pair of low-profile intakes set into the wing roots. The Viper was produced under licence by Italian aviation company Piaggio following an agreement established with its original manufacturer, the British engine firm Bristol Siddeley, during 1959.

In a structural perspective, the MB-326 was relatively straightforward. Both the fuselage and the wing were constructed in three sections; of these, the centre section of the wing was integral to the fuselage. The fuselage was divided into a forward, central, and rear section; the forward section contained the nose wheel and radio systems; the centre part, accommodated the cockpit, fuel tanks and the engine; and the rear section which comprised both the tail unit and jet pipe. The fuel system had one large tank in the middle-fuselage and two in the wingtips; a single-point pressure-fuelling system is located on the starboard side of the aircraft to provide a total refuelling time of around five minutes. The rear of each wing had flaps, and ailerons with a trim surface; each wing had 22 ribs and two spars. Wing fences were added mid-wing to increase the lift characteristics. Accordingly, the MB-326 was readily capable of performing relatively slow speed take-off and landing while retaining an excellent rate of climb.

The MB-326 was outfitted with a tandem cockpit configuration, this arrangement had been chosen to result in a slimmer and more aerodynamically efficient fuselage in comparison to the more usual side-by-side arrangement. It was covered by a bubble canopy for excellent external visibility; it featured a windscreen anti-icing system powered by the engine compressor using bleed air. The cockpit was also pressurised, enabling the MB-326 to conduct high-altitude flight. The ability to fly at higher altitudes was favourable for multiple purposes, including during the execution of aerobatic and navigational training, as well as improving fuel efficiency for long-distance flights. The onboard systems were typically pre-manufactured units which were easy both to access and to remove; several elements were also intentionally interchangeable. The exterior of the aircraft was covered by a total of 80 inspection panels and doors; in-situ engine inspection could be performed via a pair of large access panels set above and below the engine bay while another pair of doors allowed access to the intake duct's interior for the inspection of the first-stage compressor rotor blades.

== Operational history ==
=== Italy ===
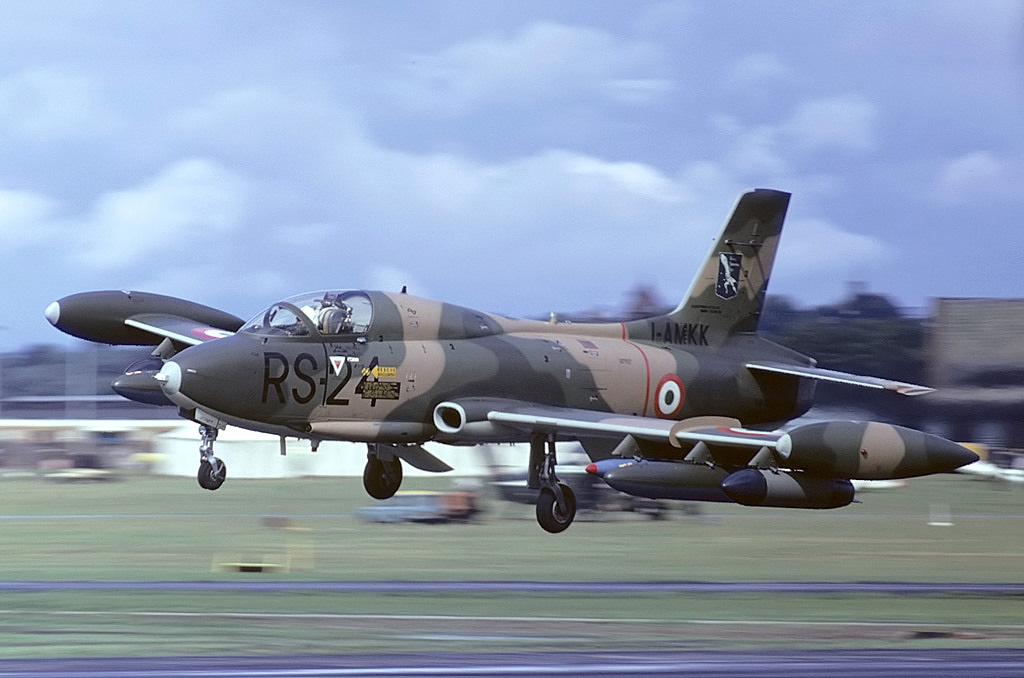
Italian Aermacchi MB-326

The MB-326 was one of the last Italian aircraft to hold the distinction of breaking multiple world records. Perhaps the most notable of these occurred during August 1961, when pilot Guido Carestiano set the C1D group 1 category altitude record of 15,489 meters. The record-breaking flights also provided publicity for the MB-326. In particular, one pilot, Massimo Ralli, was responsible for the establishment of several different records while flying the type:

- 8 February 1966, climbing records: 2 min 2 sec to 3,000 m, 3 min 56 sec to 6,000 m, 6 min 39 sec to 9,000 m, and 12,000 m in 10 min 53 sec.
- 18 March 1966, 15,690 m altitude record in horizontal flight, and 17,315 m with a launched climb.
- 18 July 1966, endurance record, with 970 km
- 2 August 1966, speed record over a 3 km straight: 871 km/h
- December 1966: speed of 880.586 km/h over 15–25 km, 831.007 km/h over 100 km, 777.667 km/h over 500 km, and another endurance record at 777.557 km

These high-profile successes functioned as objective statements of the capable performance of the MB-326 and established the type as being one of the best aircraft amongst its contemporaries in its category. Another pilot Riccardo Peracchi, who was employed by for AMI, frequently demonstrated the manoeuvrability and controllability of the aircraft at airshows for a number of years. While Peracchi displayed the MB-326's agility, Ralli concentrated on exploring its cutting-edge performance; meanwhile, early customers of the aircraft were typically reporting their satisfaction with the type to Macchi.

The first production MB-326s, following a relatively protracted development cycle, were first delivered to the Lecce-Galatina school of the AMI's 214° Group, these were temporarily fielded at Brindisi, Apulia. On 22 March 1962, the MB-326 formally entered squadron service with 43° Flyer course. The type was soon used to replace the aging North American T-6 Texan; typically, within the space of 130 hours, pilots would be as prepared to graduate as they would have been after receiving 210 hours training in the older T-6.

As a trainer, the MB-326 was considerably costlier but was met with enthusiasm amongst students; additionally, when used in combination with the Fiat G.91T advanced trainer, it enabled the enactment of an "entirely-jet" training course for AMI pilots, and moreover these were domestically designed and produced aircraft. According to aerospace publication Flight International, during the early 1960s, the AMI's flight training programme was heavily influenced by the impending entry into service of the Lockheed F-104G Starfighter.

As well as being amongst the first customers to procure the aircraft, the AMI would be amongst the final customers of the later-built models of the MB-326 as well. The service ordered a batch of 12 MB-326E, comprising six MB-326 updated to MB-326G, and six newly produced (MM.54384/389). They had provisions for armament, but the engine was the Viper 11 Mk 200 and not the Viper 20 Mk 540. In Italian service, the MB-326 was replaced by the MB-339 between 1981 and 1984, acting after that as fast linkage aircraft, replacing the old T-33s that were slightly faster. Unusually, the MB-326 did not see service with the Frecce Tricolori aerobatic team, who kept their faster G.91PANs (they were later replaced by MB-339s).

In addition to its AMI service, the MB-326 was also employed in a civilian capacity within Italy. National flag carrier Alitalia placed an order for four trainer-configured aircraft, designated as the "D" version; these were expressly demilitarized and equipped with specialised instrumentation in order to train the airliner's pilots in preparation for the arrival of the new generation of jetliners that were being procured by the airliner.

Neither the "A" and "C" models of the MB-326 would ever be realized. The "A" variant had been intended to be operated as a light attack aircraft, armed with a pair of 7.62 mm machine guns which were to be installed upon the aircraft's nose. While none were originally built, a number of MB-326s were later referred to by the "A" designation, however, this was meant to indicate that these had been provisioned with a Marconi-built AD-370 automatic direction finder (ADF). The "C" version was envisioned as being provisioned with a nose-mounted North American Search And Ranging Radar (NASARR) unit and other electronic equipment in order to be used for the training of AMI F-104 pilots, however, this variant only appeared as a mock-up.

=== Australia ===
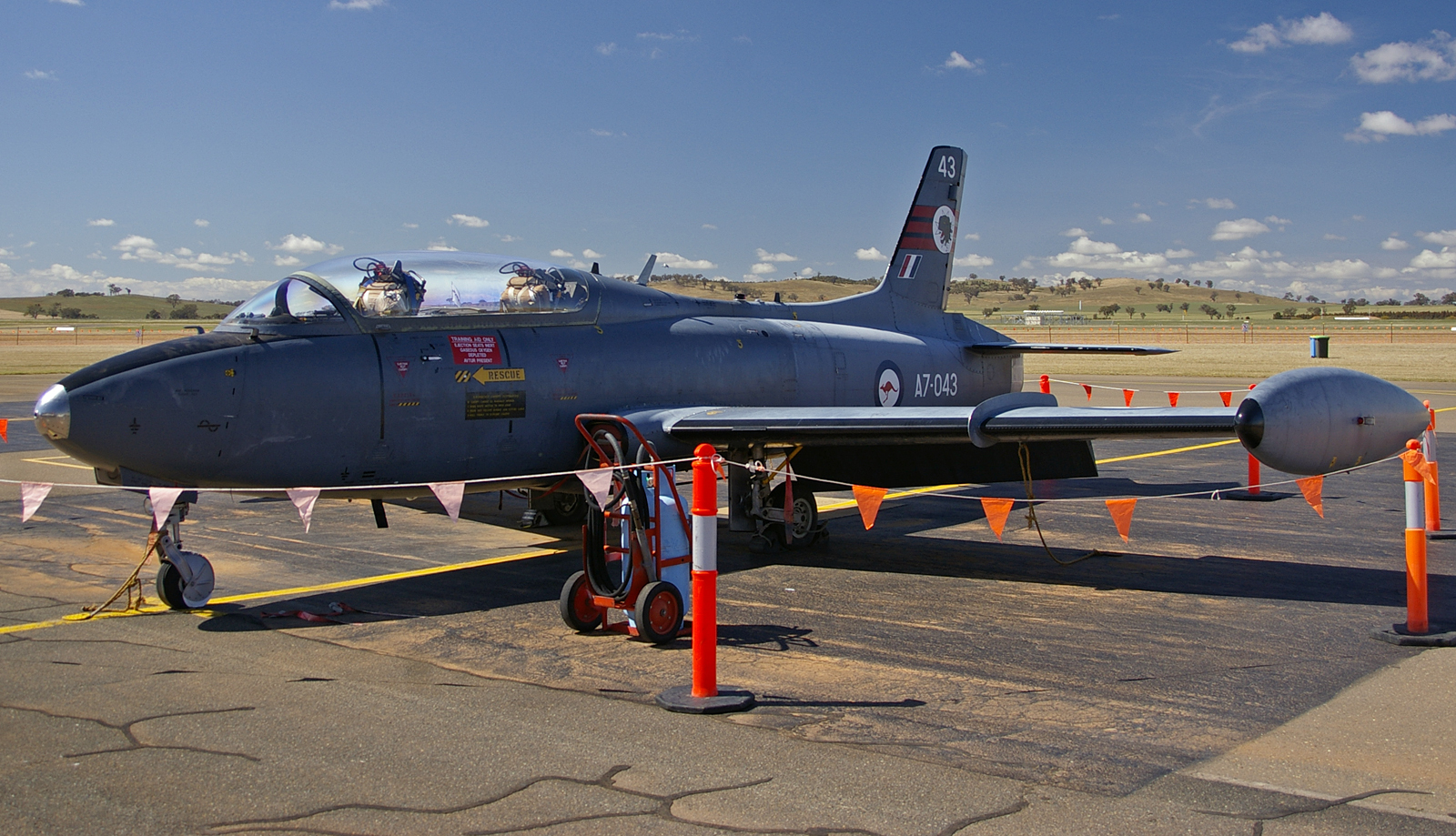
A7-043 (MB-326H) at the RAAF Base Wagga in Australia.

The Royal Australian Air Force (RAAF) used the MB-326H as a jet trainer. A total of 97 were ordered: 12 were delivered by Macchi, 18 assembled from kits in Australia, and another 67 were built by the Commonwealth Aircraft Corporation and Hawker Aircraft with the designation CA-30. They were essentially similar to the MB-326G but with improved avionics. The RAAF's aerobatic team, The Roulettes, flew the MB-326H from December 1970 until 1989. RAAF pilot training until 1975 consisted of 60 hours pre-selection on CAC Winjeels (from 1975 onwards the PAC CT/4 Airtrainer), 150 hours medium training and another 75 hours advanced training on MB-326H. Pilots selected for combat aircraft then progressed to the Mirage IIIOD.

Although well-suited to its task and widely liked for its excellent handling, the service career of the MB-326 was cut short because of structural fatigue problems. The Australian fleet, for example, had a life-of-type extension program in the 1980s, and were then re-winged in the early 1990s after a fatigue-related crash. Even so, the MB-326 was supplemented by new Pilatus PC-9 trainers to reduce the flying hours being accumulated by the MB-326. The last examples of the MB-326 were withdrawn by 2001 and replaced by the Hawk 127.

=== Brazil ===
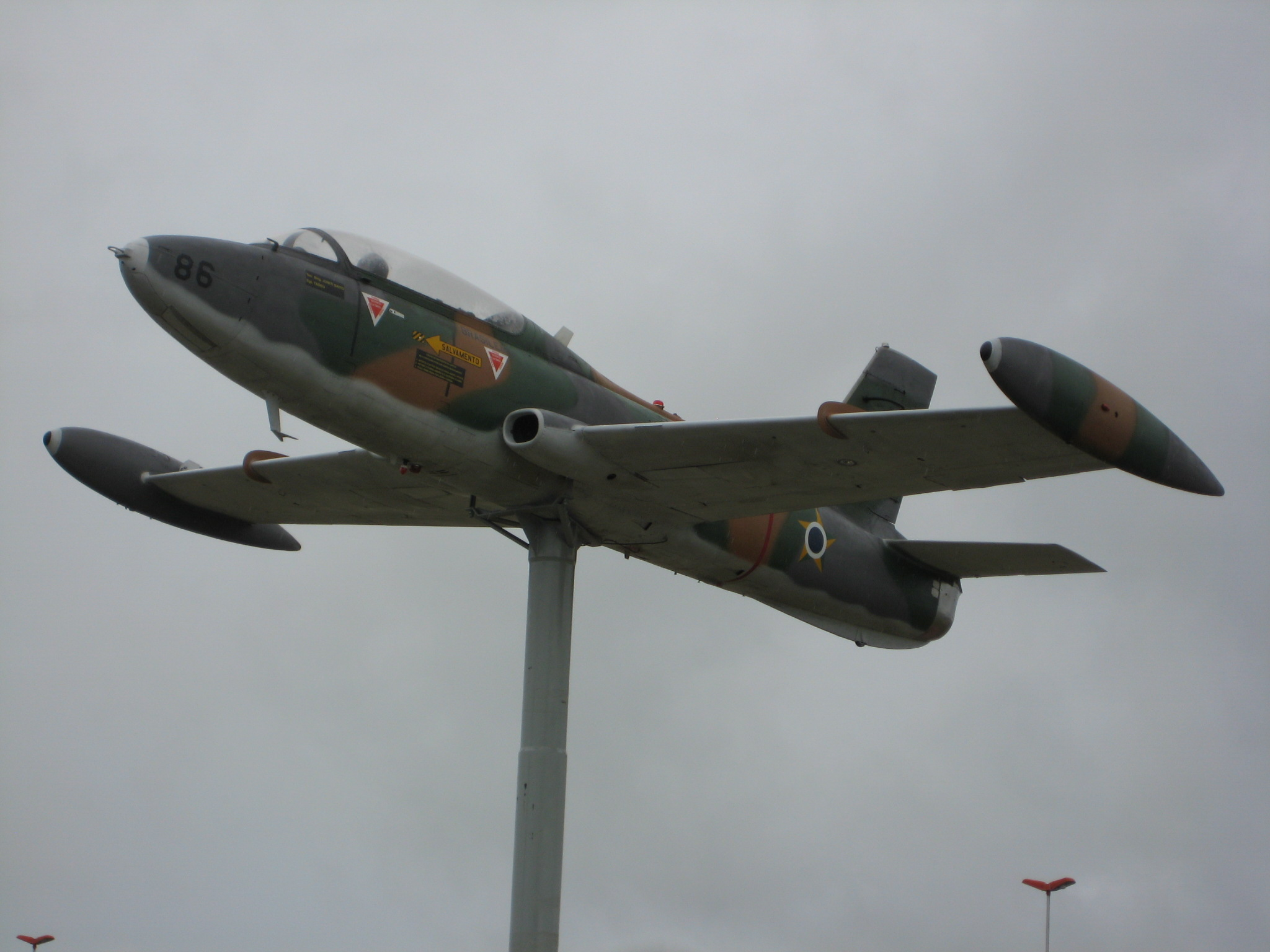
Brazilian MB-326.

Brazil was the main customer for the MB-326, in 1970 ordering two prototypes and 166 MB-326GCs, called the AT-26 Xavante. The aircraft was produced under license by Embraer with a further six for Togo and 10 for Paraguay.

Besides, the aircraft was important for two developments: the MB.326K the MB.326L were produced as the direct ancestors of the Aermacchi MB.339. With license-building in Brazil, the MB.326 opened the field to further collaborations, leading to the AMX. Neither the MB.339 nor the AMX were as successful as the MB.326, but they were capable of further steps in technology and commerce.

=== South Africa ===
South Africa obtained a license to produce the MB-326M (similar to the 'G' model), as the Impala Mk I in 1964 with production starting in 1966. It received 16 Italian-built aircraft followed by about 125 built locally by the Atlas Aircraft Corporation, using them both as trainers and in an armed configuration. Seven examples of the MB-326K were also bought as light attack aircraft, with a further 15 assembled from kits, while around 78 were licence-produced and known as the Impala Mk II. Licence production of the single seat version began in 1974. The Impala Mk II, locally manufactured and equipped with French armament, was also advanced with a South African ECM suite.

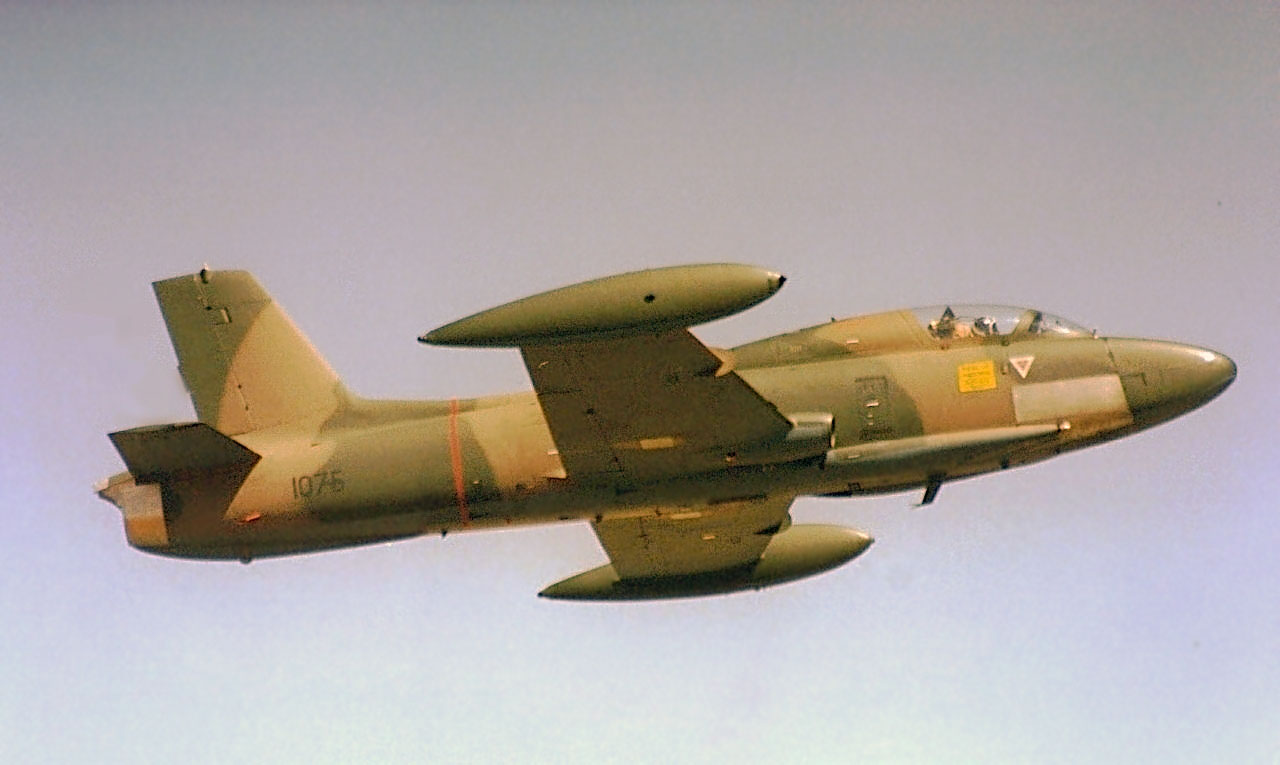
An Atlas Impala Mk.2 of the South African Air Force

The South African Defence Force employed Impalas during campaigns against the People's Armed Forces for the Liberation of Angola (FAPLA) and Cuban expeditionary troops in Angola between 1975 and 1989. Impala pilots typically flew at 550–650 km/h at a height of 15 m to avoid Angolan air defences. Over the course of the South African Border War, one was downed by an SA-7; another returned with an unexploded missile in its exhaust.

The aircraft had many advantages over expensive supersonic jets. Although slower, it could operate from relatively primitive airfields and strike swiftly. The South African Air Force (SAAF) used up to 6 x 120 kg or 4 x 250 kg bombs. The main armament consisted of 68 mm SNEB rocket-launchers (four x 6 or two x 18), and two 30 mm autocannon (with 300 rounds). These cannons were the real bonus for the Impala Mk II, helping to give a superior performance compared to earlier two-seat versions. The latter could also carry a pair of 30 mm DEFA guns in under-wing pods. However, dual capability as trainer-attackers was better appreciated, as was the availability of six hard points and so dual-seat versions were far more common. Six squadrons were equipped with the Impala Mk II in the SAAF during the 1970s and 1980s. Prior to Operation Moduler, most Impalas were withdrawn from their operating bases in South-West Africa, leaving the work to Mirage IIIs and Blackburn Buccaneers.

Impala Mk IIs were also opportunistically used as interceptors. In several encounters in 1985 with Mi-8 and Mi-24 helicopters, they shot down a total of six. This happened during a crucial phase of the ground war, when Angolan and Cuban troops were checked in an offensive against UNITA bases. This ended in disaster for the Angolan/Cuban alliance when their supplies were cut off by UNITA and the SAAF and front line troops ran out of ammunition. Helicopters were being used to supply the besieged troops and the SAAF cut off this link. Two Mi-24s were shot down in the first encounter while escorting Mi-17s. The MiG-21s that escorted them flew too high to react in time. Two days later the Impala Mk IIs struck again, downing two Mi-24s and two Mi-17s. Attacks on unsuspecting helicopters were carried out with only two guns per aircraft. The single seat Impala Mk IIs were also sometimes armed with Matra R550 Magic air-to-air missiles for self-defence. The Impala Mk II operated at extreme ranges and had to fly very low, climbing only when helicopters were seen at medium altitude. After each attack they returned to low level to avoid interception by enemy MiGs.

The Silver Falcons, the SAAF aerobatic team, were equipped before with Impala Mk Is.

The flying school for Impalas was Flying Training School at Langebaanweg while operational squadrons were 4, 5, 6, 7 and 8 Squadrons, with 85 Combat Flying School also having a small number of Impalas to supplement their Mirage trainers.

=== Argentina ===
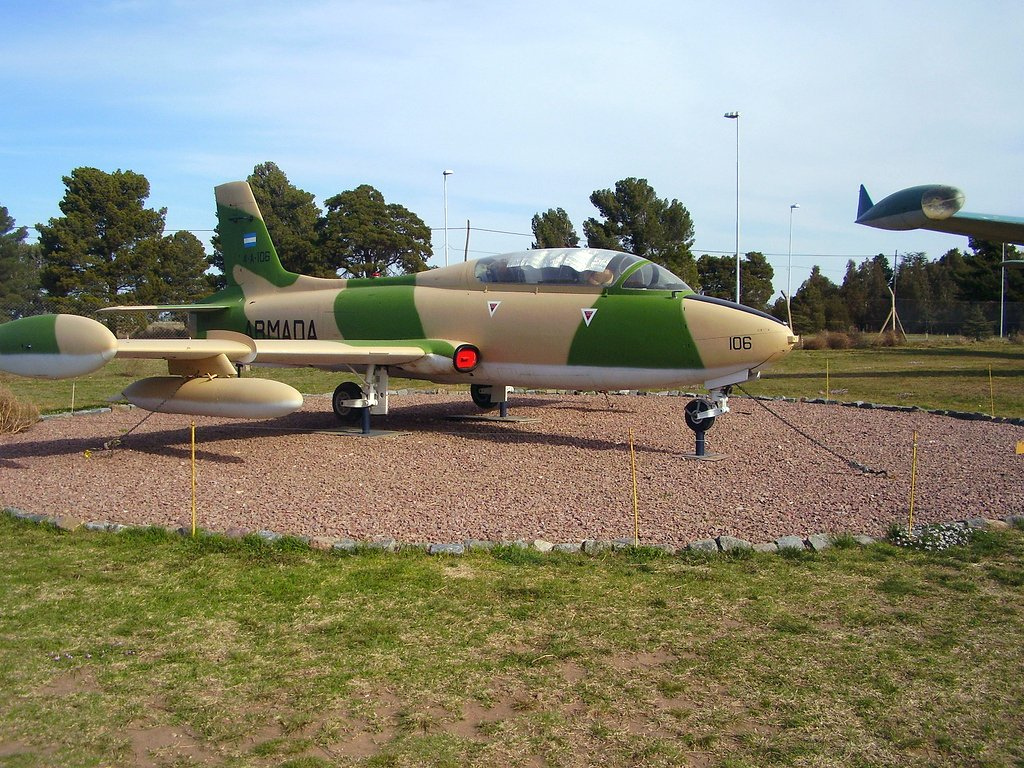
Argentine MB-326.

A number of MB-326 aircraft, together with the more modern MB-339, formed the equipment of the Argentine Navy's 1 Escuadrilla de Ataque in 1982, when Argentina invaded the Falkland Islands. A number of MB-326s were deployed to bases along the Argentine coast immediately following the Argentine invasion, but soon returned to the squadron's base at Punta Indio. While several MB-339s were deployed to the Falklands, the MB-326s remained on the mainland. After the end of the war, 11 EMB-326GBs were received from Brazil to replace losses and restore 1 Escuadrilla de Ataque's strength.

=== Other operators ===
In stark contrast to the competing Fiat G.91, which was often considered to be not very convincing as a light fighter, the MB-326 was quick to achieve several export successes in this capacity. The type had ultimately failed to impress other NATO nations, who only sparsely adopted it into their air forces. However, the MB-326 did achieve a visible measure of success amongst many Third World countries, leading to the MB-326 seeing considerable use as a front-line combat aircraft in a number of regional conflicts.

Eight MB-326Bs were ordered by Tunisia in 1965. These were developed from basic MB-326s with a weapons capability, with the 37th series AMI aircraft being converted (it had civilian markings I-MAKC). The main innovation was its ground attack capability, with six underwing pylons, holding a maximum of 907 kg of stores. In the same year, Ghana ordered nine similar MB-326Fs.

Other MB-326Gs used the Viper Mk 20 engine which provided 1,524 kg of thrust, and were consequently faster and had an increased payload of 1,814 kg max. Argentina ordered eight, initially as the MB-326K, later called the MB-326GB.

Another 17 MB-326GCs were built in Italy for Zaire (Force Arienne Zairoise) and 23 for the Zambian Air Force.

The MB-326K (originally known as the MB-336) was the last generation model, fitted with the Viper Mk 600 engine, capable of 1,814 kg thrust to give an even better performance. The first flight took place on 22 August 1970. The two prototypes were I-AMKK and I-KMAK, the MB-326G was converted to this new model.

Dubai bought three in 1974, and a further three in 1978 (MB-326KD), Tunisia eight (MB-326KT), Ghana nine (MB-326KB) and Zaire eight (MB-326KB).

The MB-326L was essentially the MB-326K with two seats. Two MB-326LD were supplied to Dubai and four MB-326LD to Tunisia.

The measures to save costs led the MB-326 to be frequently substituted for by propeller-driven models, however, the Macchi was often flexible enough to act as a medium trainer and light attack aircraft.

== Variants ==
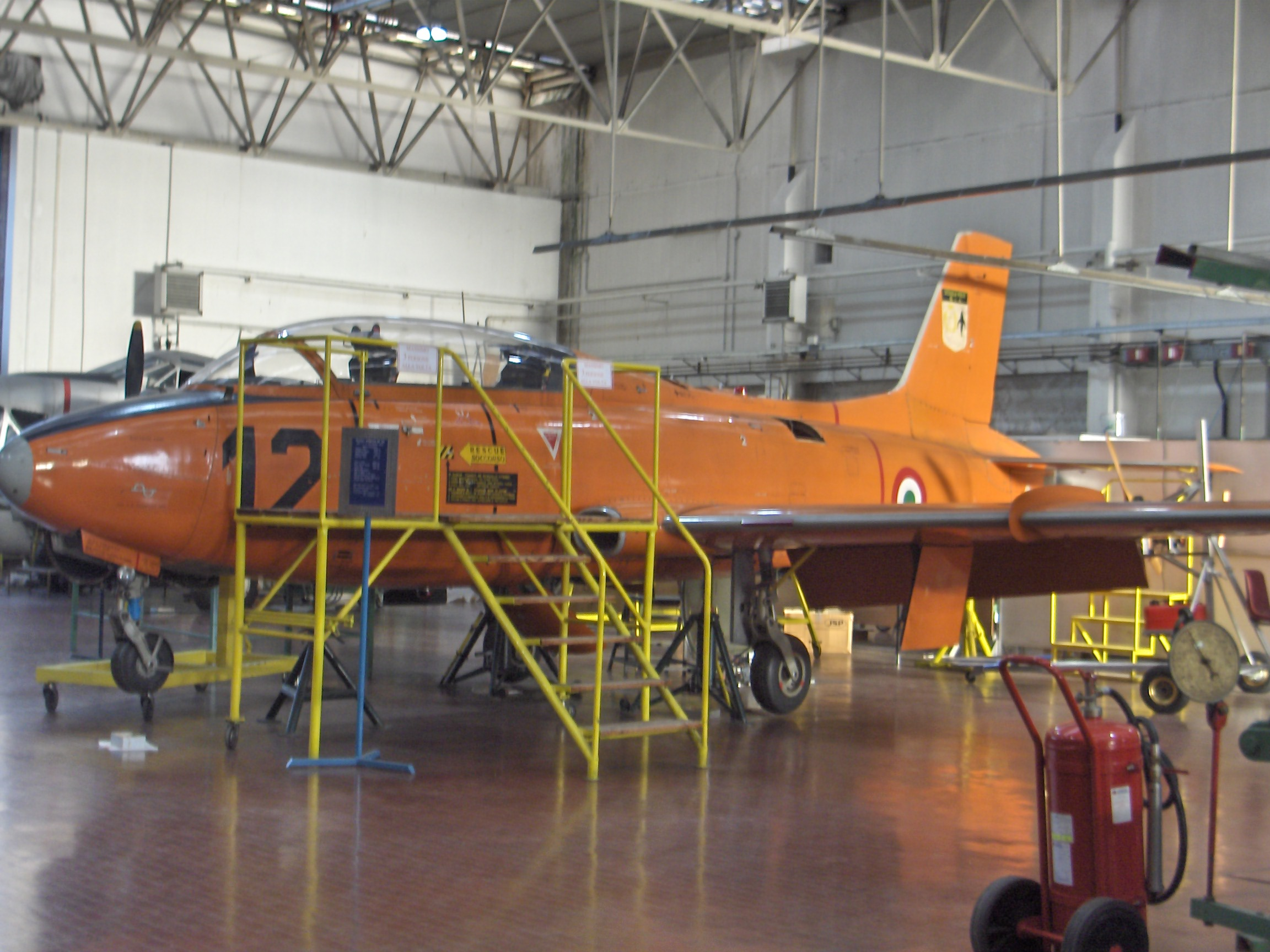
MB-326A ITI A.Malignani Udine, Italy (Technical-Aeronautical School)

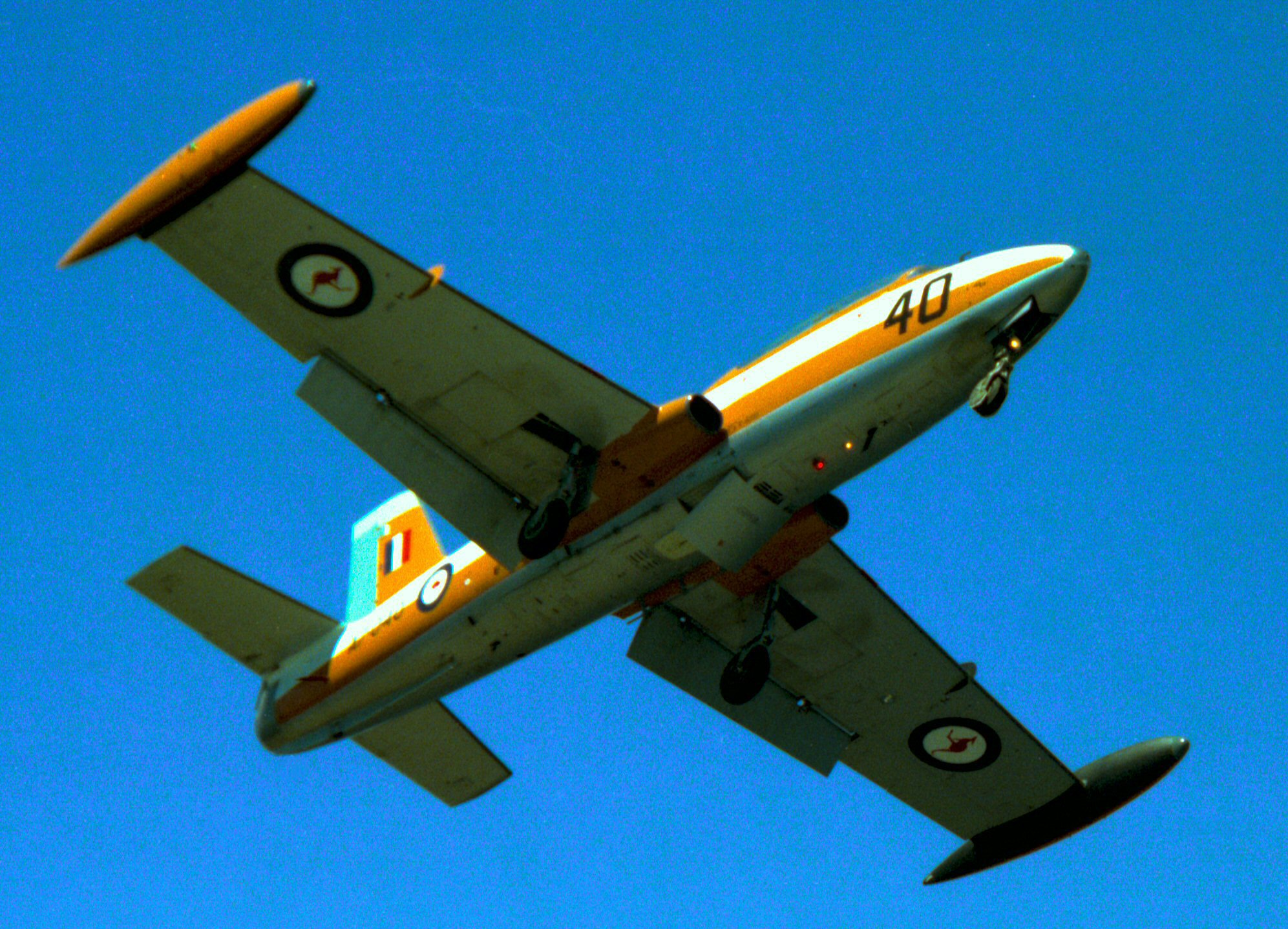
A7-040 (MB-326H) during a flypast of HMAS Melbourne off Fremantle in 1980

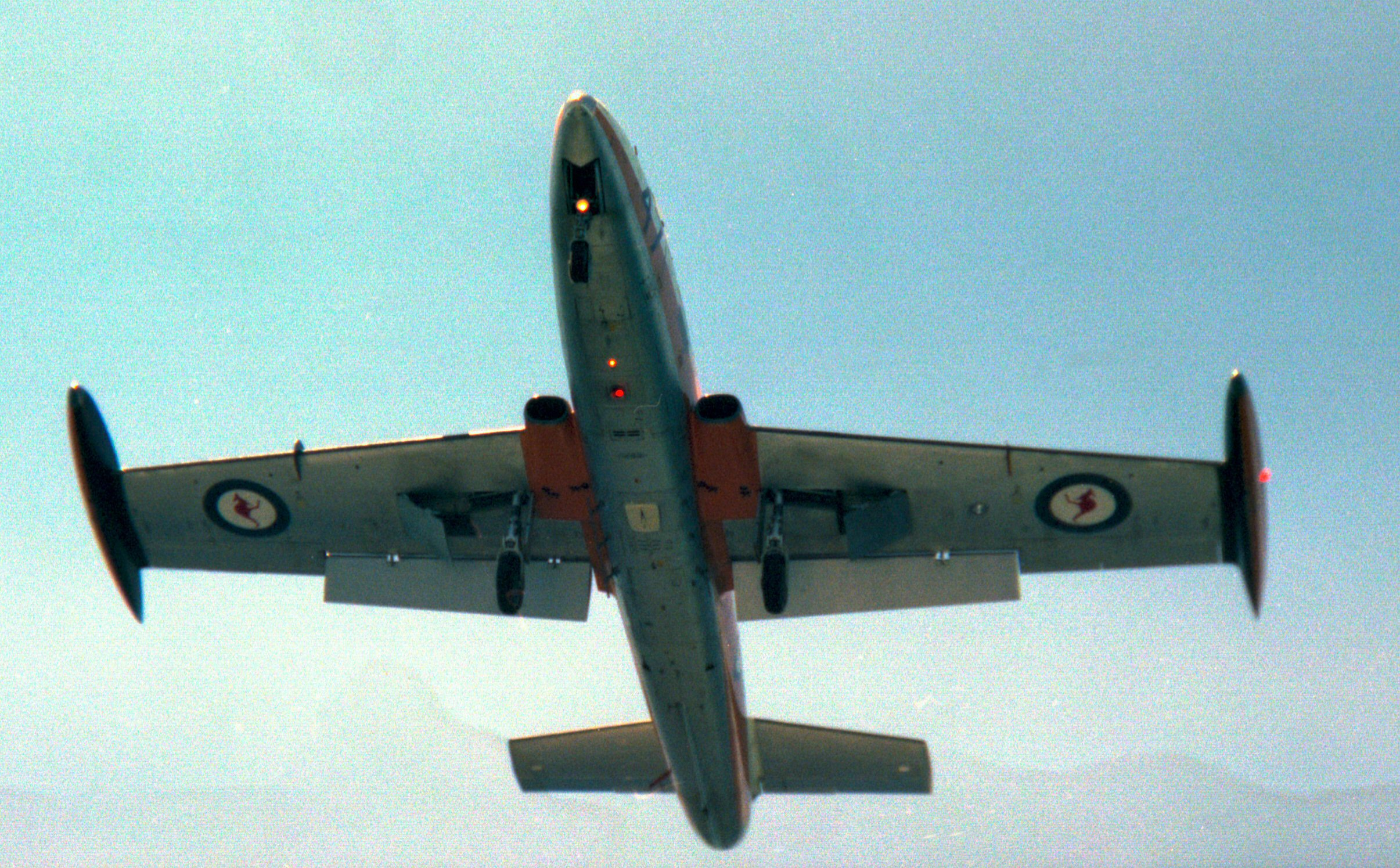
MB-326H

- MB-326: Two prototypes and 125 production training aircraft for the Italian Air Force.
- MB-326A: Proposed armed version for weapons training, not built.
- MB-326B: Eight two-seat jet trainer, light attack aircraft for Tunisia.
- MB-326D: Four two-seat unarmed jet trainers for Alitalia.
- MB-326E: Six two-seat armed jet trainers for the Italian Air Force.
- MB-326F: Nine two-seat jet trainer, light attack aircraft for Ghana.
- MB-326G: Two two-seat jet trainer, ground-attack aircraft.
  - MB-326GB: Two-seat jet trainer, ground-attack aircraft. Eight were sold to the Argentine Navy. 17 aircraft were exported to Zaire, and another 23 aircraft to Zambia.
  - MB-326GC: Two-seat jet trainer, ground-attack aircraft for the Brazilian Air Force. 167 aircraft built under licence in Brazil as the Embraer EMB-326 for the Brazilian Air Force. Eleven of them were transferred to the Argentine Navy after the Falklands War. Six aircraft were exported to Togo, and another ten to Paraguay. Total production, 182.
  - AT-26 Xavante: Brazilian Air Force designation of the MB-326GC.
  - RT-26 Xavante: Some AT-26 Xavantes were converted into reconnaissance aircraft.
- MB-326H: 87 two-seat jet trainers built for the Royal Australian Air Force, and 10 for the Royal Australian Navy. Twelve Italian-built aircraft and 85 built under licence in Australia by the Commonwealth Aircraft Corporation with the designation "CA-30".
- MB-326K: Single-seat ground-attack aircraft for the South African Air Force. Built under licence in South Africa by the Atlas Aircraft Corporation.
  - Impala Mk II: South African Air Force designation of the MB-326K.
  - MB-326KB: Single-seat ground-attack aircraft for Zaire. (Six built).
  - MB-326KD: Single-seat ground-attack aircraft for Dubai. (Three built).
  - MB-326KG: Single-seat ground-attack aircraft for Ghana. (Four built).
  - MB-326KT: Single-seat ground-attack aircraft for Tunisia. (Seven built).
- MB-326L: Two-seat advanced jet trainer aircraft.
  - MB-326LD: Two-seat advanced jet training aircraft for Dubai. (Two built).
  - MB-326LT: Two-seat advanced jet training aircraft for Tunisia. Four built.
- MB-326M: Two-seat jet trainer, ground-attack aircraft for the South African Air Force. Built under licence in South Africa by the Atlas Aircraft Corporation.
  - Impala Mk I: South African Air Force designation of the MB-326M.
- MB-326RM: Five Italian Air Force MB-326s were converted into ECM aircraft.

== Operators ==
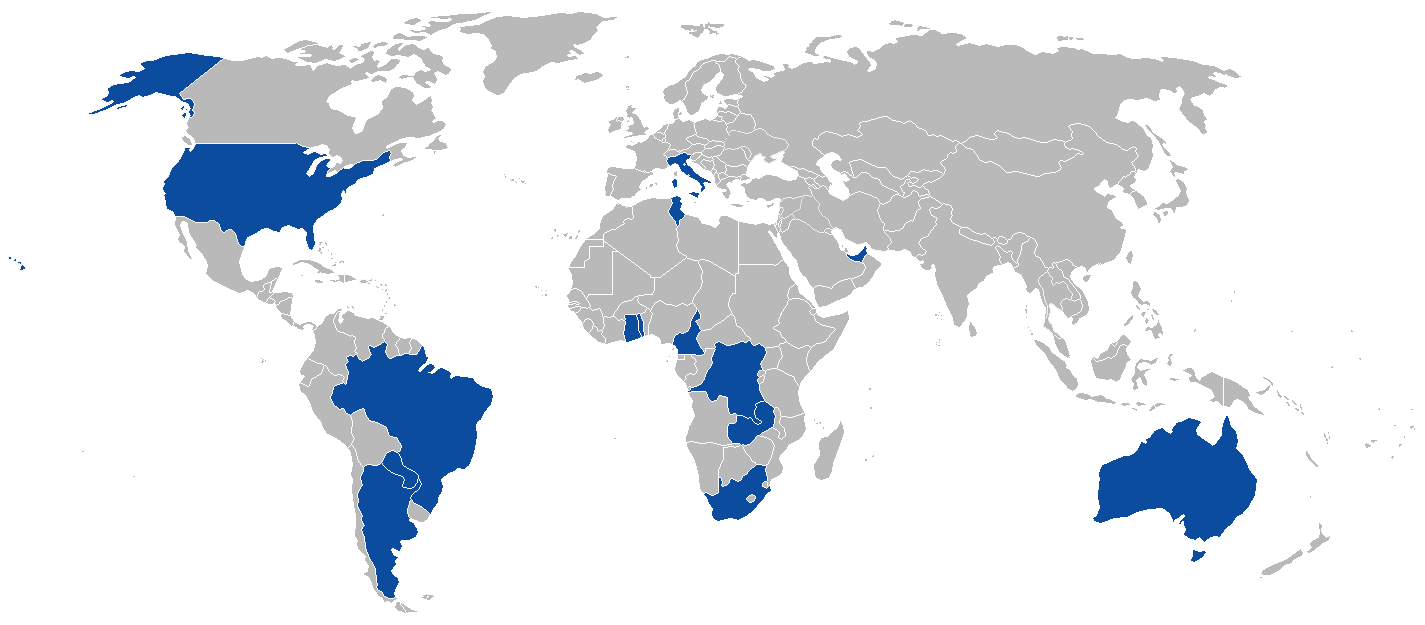
Map of Aermacchi MB-326 world operators

Argentina

- Argentine Navy – The Argentine Naval Aviation received 8 MB-326GB plus 11 MB-326GC ex-Brazilian Air Force

Australia

- Royal Australian Air Force operated 87 MB-326Hs from 1967 to 2001. As of 2014 some fuselages are still in use at RAAF Base Wagga as training aids.
  - No. 25 Squadron RAAF
  - No. 76 Squadron RAAF
  - No. 77 Squadron RAAF
  - No. 79 Squadron RAAF
  - No. 2 Flying Training School RAAF
  - No. 2 Operational Conversion Unit RAAF
  - No. 5 Operational Training Unit RAAF
  - Central Flying School RAAF
  - Roulettes
  - Telstars
  - Aircraft Research and Development Unit
  - RAAF School of Technical Training (still in use as training aids)
- Fleet Air Arm (RAN) operated 10 MB-326Hs from 1970 to 1983.
  - No. 724 Squadron RAN

Brazil

- Brazilian Air Force received 182 MB-326GCs (known as the AT-26 Xavante) and 12 Atlas Impala ex-South African Air Force. The last examples were retired on 2 December 2010.

Cameroon

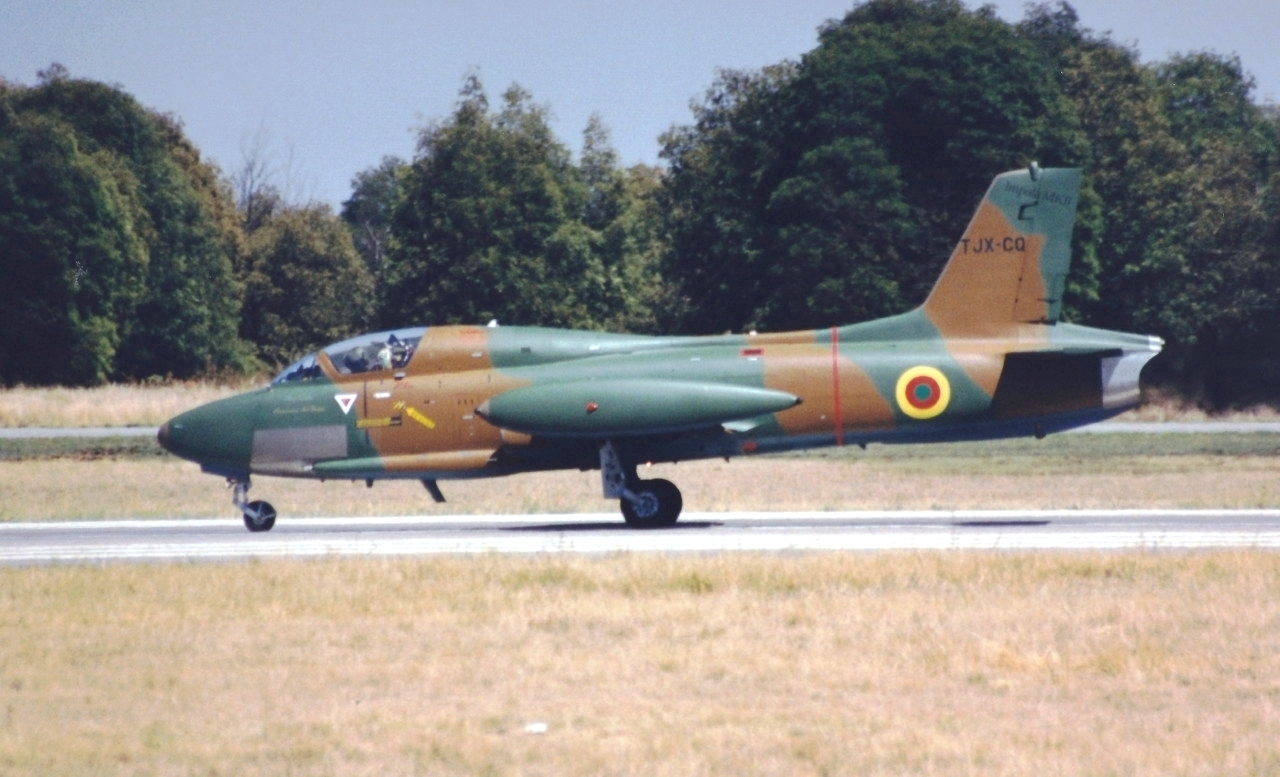
Cameroon Air Force MB326 Impala II

- Cameroon Air Force: Six ex-SAAF Impala Mk I and IIs

Democratic Republic of the Congo

- Air Force of the Democratic Republic of the Congo

Dubai

- Dubai Defence Force Air Wing – 6 MB 326KD, 3 MB 326LD passed on to the United Arab Emirates Air Force in 1999.

Ghana

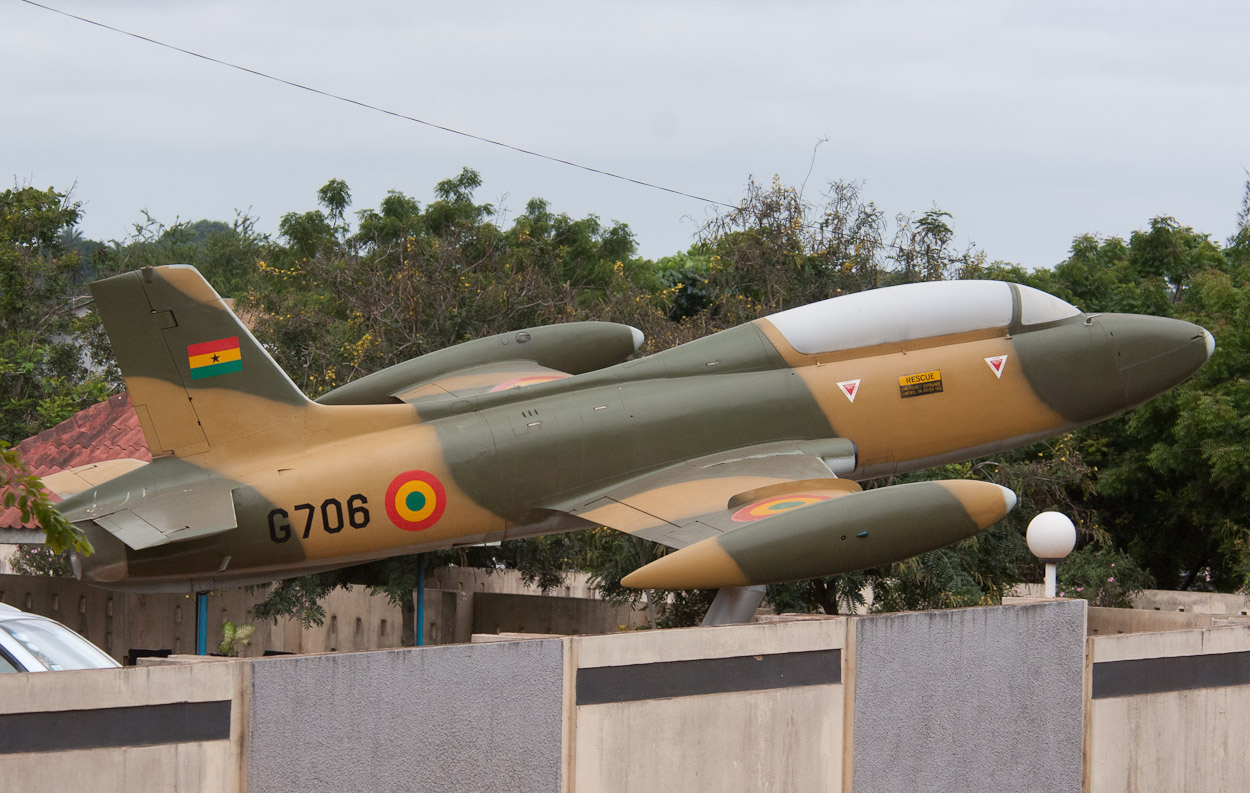
Ghana Air Force MB326

- Ghana Air Force received 15 MB.326s.

Italy

- Alitalia operated 4 MB-326D as trainer
- Italian Air Force operated 135 MB-326 and two MB-326G for evaluation test

Paraguay

- Paraguayan Air Force operates ten EMB-326GBs/AT-26 Xavante, some in reserve.

South Africa

- South African Air Force operated 62 MB-326s plus 125 Impala Mk.1s and 73 Mk.2s
  - 4 Squadron SAAF
  - 5 Squadron SAAF
  - 6 Squadron SAAF
  - 7 Squadron SAAF
  - 8 Squadron SAAF
  - 24 Squadron SAAF
  - 40 Squadron SAAF
  - 85 Combat Flying School
  - Silver Falcons

Togo

- Togolese Air Force received six MB-326GCs.

Tunisia

- Tunisian Air Force received 16 MB-326s.

United Arab Emirates

- United Arab Emirates Air Force inherited six aircraft from the Dubai Defence Force Air Wing.

United States

- National Test Pilot School

Zaire

- Zaire Air Force received 25 MB-326GBs.

Zambia

- Zambian Air Force received 23 MB-326GB. Retired by end of 2025.

== Accidents and losses ==
- 6 December 1990: An MB-326 of the Italian Air force crashed into a school classroom at Casalecchio di Reno near Bologna, Italy, killing 12 students and injuring 88 other students and staff. The aircraft had been abandoned minutes earlier by its pilot, who ejected following an on-board fire and loss of control.
- 2 October 1993: An MB-326M Impala of the South African Air Forces's Silver Falcons aerobatic team crashed following structural failure of the right wing during a performance at the Lanseria Airshow near Johannesburg, South Africa. The pilot ejected but was killed.
- 22 March 2025: An MB-326M Impala, ZU-IMP, crashed during a performance at the West Coast Airshow held at the Saldanha Vredenburg Municipal Airport (FASD), Saldanha Bay, West Cape, South Africa.

== Aircraft on display ==
Argentina

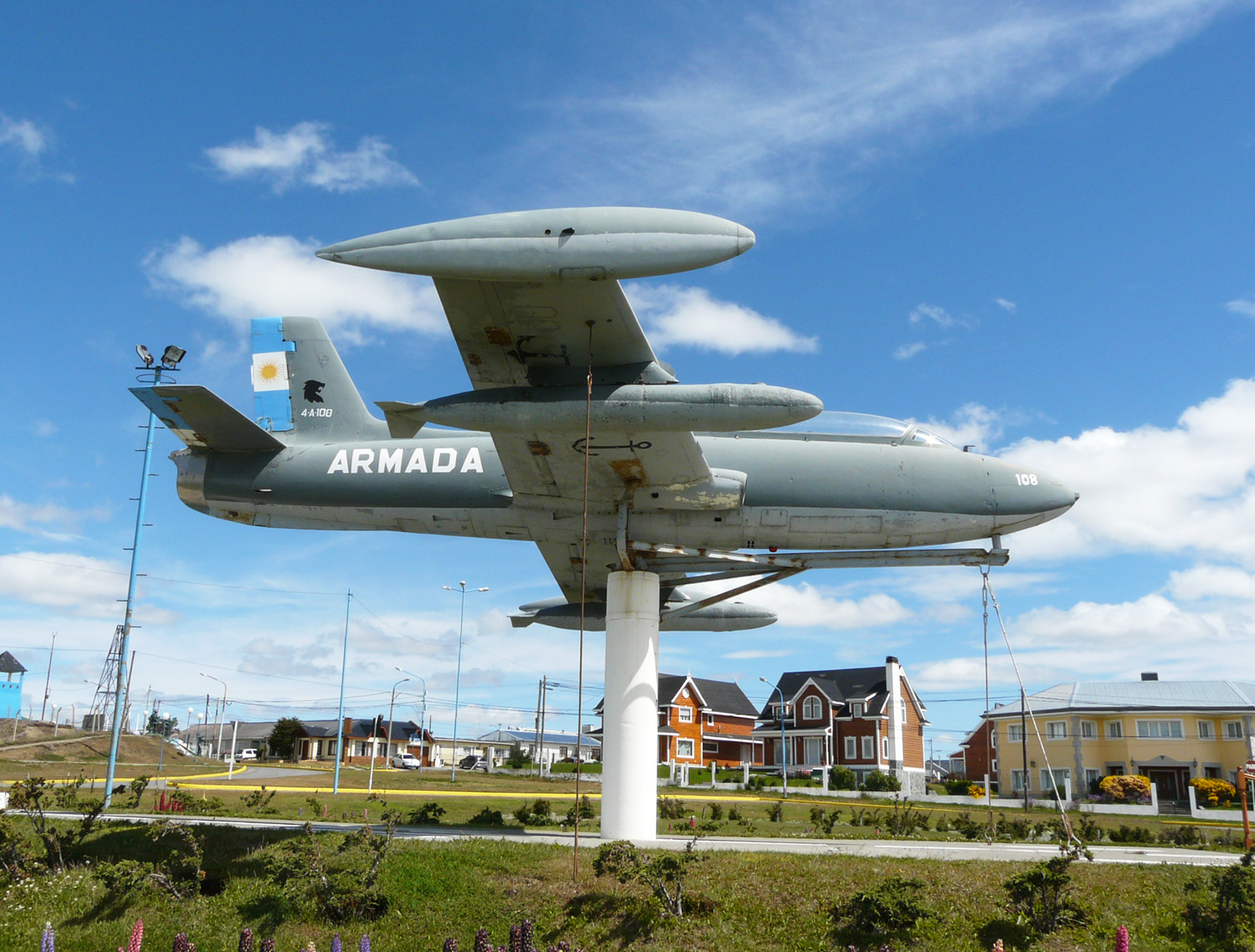
Argentine Navy MB-326 preserved at Río Grande, Tierra del Fuego.

- 0618 – MB-326 on static display at the Naval Aviation Museum in Bahía Blanca, Buenos Aires.
- 0647 – MB-326GB on static display at Río Grande, Tierra del Fuego.

Australia

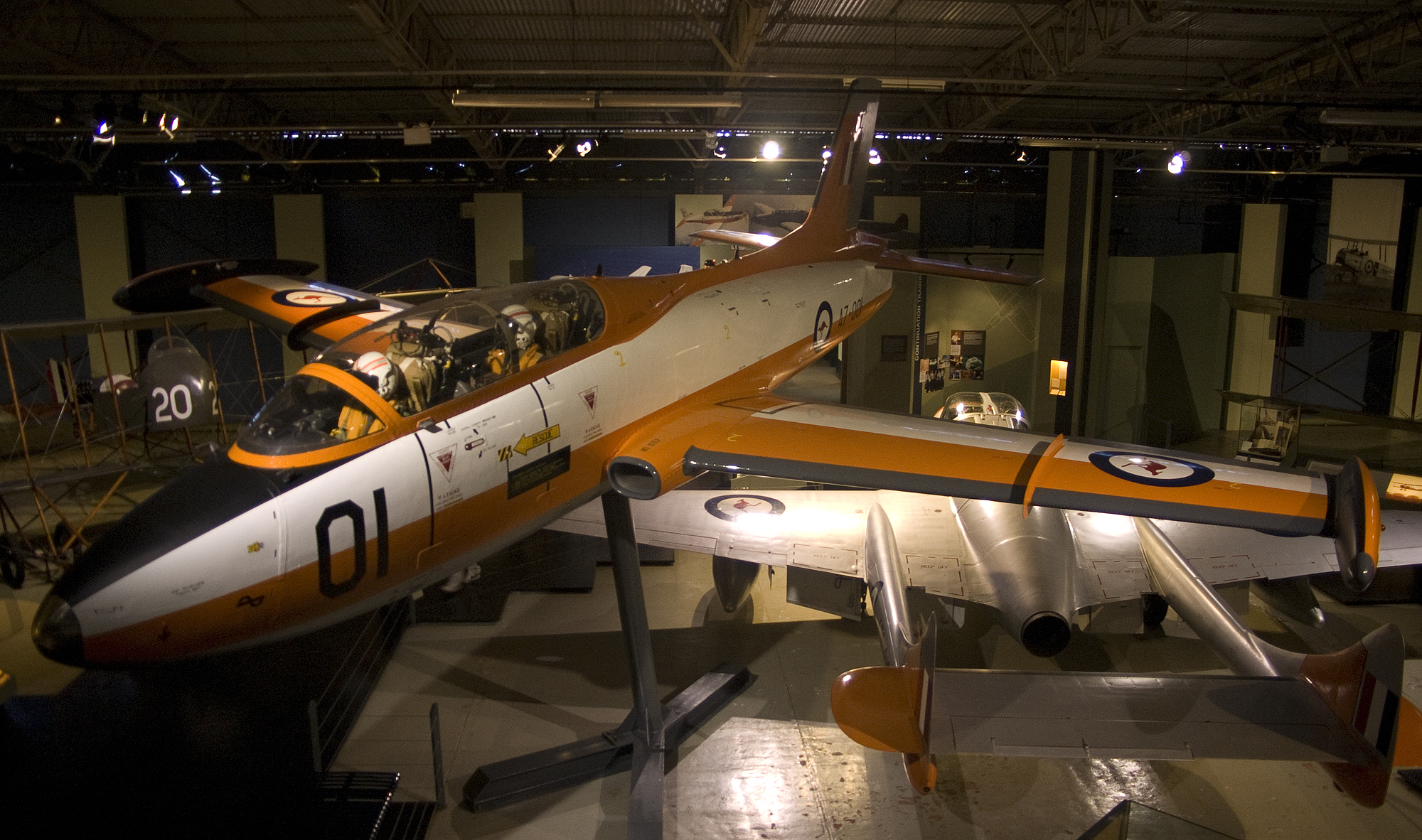
A7-001 on display at the RAAF Museum.

- A7-001 – MB-326H on static display at the RAAF Museum in Point Cook, Victoria.
- A7-014 – MB-326H on static display at the Gippsland Armed Forces Museum in Sale, Victoria.
- A7-015 – MB-326H on static display at the Gippsland Armed Forces Museum in Sale, Victoria.
- A7-026 – MB-326H on static display at the South Australian Aviation Museum in Port Adelaide, South Australia.
- A7-027 – MB-326H on static display at RAAF Base Pearce in Bullsbrook, Western Australia.
- A7-030 – MB-326H in storage at the Historical Aircraft Restoration Society in Albion Park Rail, New South Wales.
- A7-047 – MB-326H at the RAAF Base Amberley Aviation Heritage Centre in Ipswich, Queensland.
- A7-054 – MB-326H on static display at the Benalla Aviation Museum in Benalla, Victoria.
- A7-057 – MB-326H on static display at the Merredin Military Museum in Merredin, Western Australia.
- A7-062 – MB-326H on static display at Fighter World at RAAF Base Williamtown, Williamtown, New South Wales.
- A7-066 – MB-326H on static display at the Aviation Heritage Museum in Bull Creek, Western Australia. It is painted as A7-025.
- A7-067 – MB-326H forward fuselage on static display at Fighter World at RAAF Base Williamtown, New South Wales.
- A7-072 – MB-326H on static display, Queensland Air Museum, Caloundra, Sunshine Coast. <QAM>
- A7-077 – MB-326H on static display at the Fleet Air Arm Museum at HMAS Albatross, Nowra, New South Wales.
- A7-097 – MB-326H at the RAAF Museum in Point Cook, Victoria.

Austria

- 472 – MB-326M on display at the Österreichisches Luftfahrtmuseum Graz-Thalerhof in Graz, Styria.

Brazil

- FAB-4480, an AT-26 Xavante (Brazilian version of Aermacchi MB-326, built by Embraer) on static display in the public entrance of the Barreira do Inferno Launch Center in Parnamirim, Rio Grande do Norte.
- FAB-4488, an AT-26 Xavante on static display in the military area of the Gov. Carlos Wilson Airport in Fernando de Noronha, Pernambuco.
- FAB-4535, an AT-26 Xavante on static display in the entrance of the CINDACTA III building in Recife, Pernambuco.
- FAB-4548, an AT-26 Xavante on static display in the entrance of the Hospital da Aeronáutica do Recife (Brazilian Air Force Hospital in Recife).
- FAB-4556, an AT-26 Xavante on static display in the parking lot of the Colégio Militar do Recife, a military-managed high school in Recife, Pernambuco .
- FAB-4560, an AT-26 Xavante on static display at Jardim Vila Galvão square, in the city of Guarulhos.
- FAB-4566, an AT-26 Xavante in storage at the TAM Museum in São Carlos, São Paulo.
- FAB-4590, an AT-26 Xavante on display at Espaço Ciência, a free admission science museum in Olinda, Pernambuco. The original painting of this aircraft has been replaced by a Romero Britto-styled livery.
- FAB-4632, an AT-26 Xavante on static display by the artificial lake in São José do Rio Preto, São Paulo.
- FAB-4635, an AT-26A Xavante on static display near lake Joao Barbosa Sitônio in Triunfo, Pernambuco.

Italy

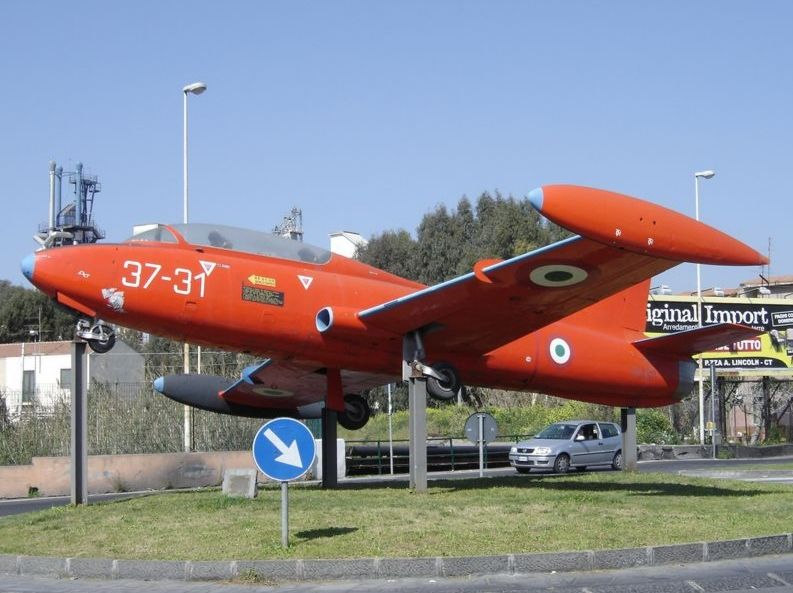
Aermacchi MB-326E on a roundabout in Catania, Sicily, near Fontanarossa airport.

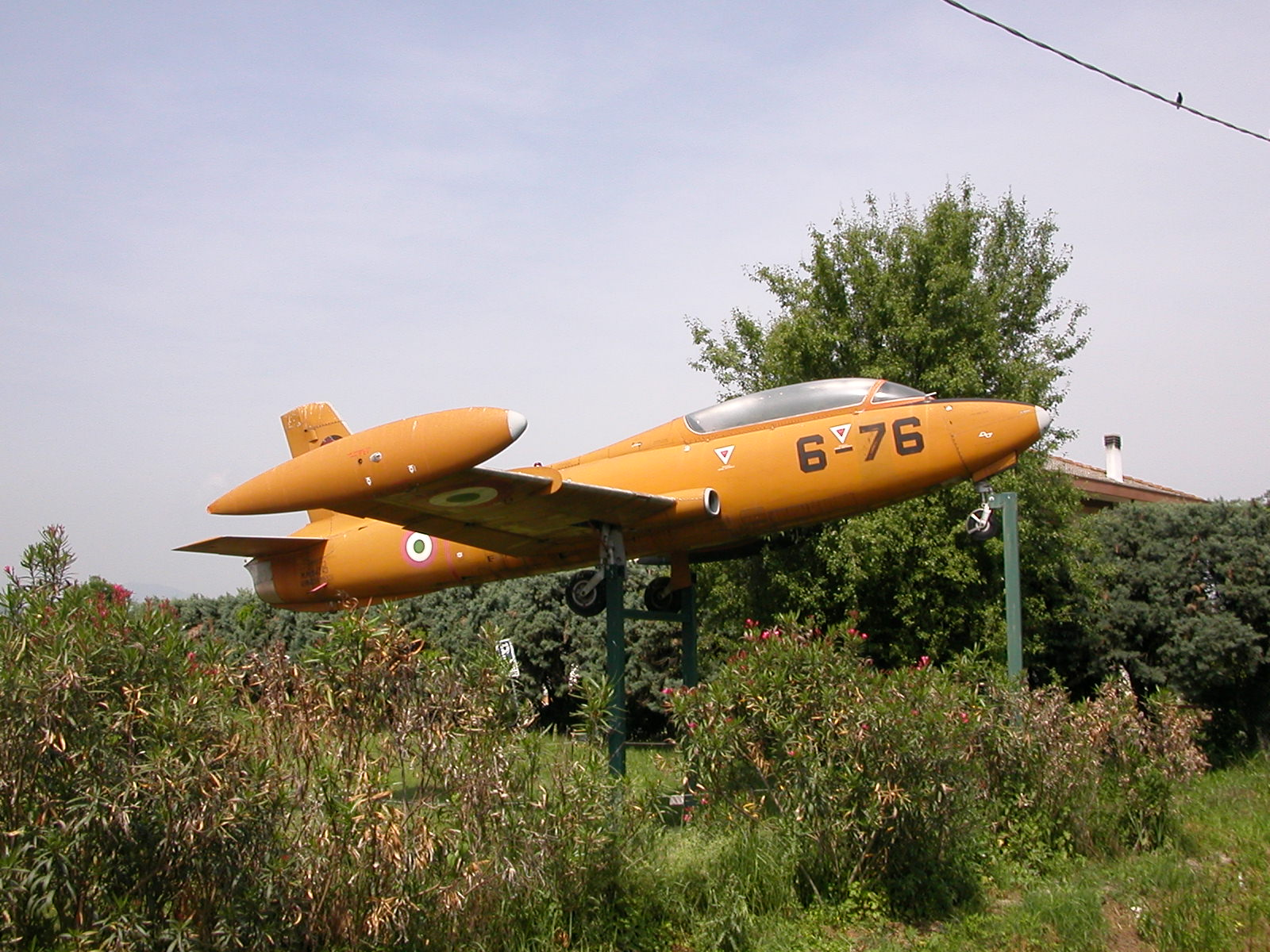
MB-326 at San Pelagio Air and Space Museum.

- MM54245 - MB-326E identification code 37–31, with the emblem of the 41º Stormo on the drift fin. On static display on the roundabout between via Santa Maria Goretti, via San Giuseppe la Rena and via Tiro a Segno in Catania, Sicily, near the Catania-Fontanarossa Airport.
- MM54243 – MB-326 on static display at the San Pelagio Air and Space Museum in Due Carrare, Veneto.
- MM54266 – MB-326D on static display at the Istituto Tecnico Industriale Aeronautico in Udine, Friuli-Venezia Giulia.

South Africa

- 494 – MB-326M on static display at Impala Primary School in Kempton Park, Gauteng.
- MB-326 on static display at Port Elizabeth Airport in Port Elizabeth, Eastern Cape.
- 531 – MB-326M on static display at Air Force Base Ysterplaat in Cape Town, Western Cape.
- 532 – MB-326M on static display at the South African Air Force Museum in Centurion, Gauteng.
- 589 – MB-326M on static display at the South African Air Force Museum in Centurion, Gauteng.
- 1000 – MB-326K on static display at the South African Air Force Museum in Centurion, Gauteng.
- 1045 – MB-326K on static display at the South African National Museum of Military History in Johannesburg, Gauteng.
- 1065 – MB-326K on static display at the South African Air Force Museum in Centurion, Gauteng.

Ghana

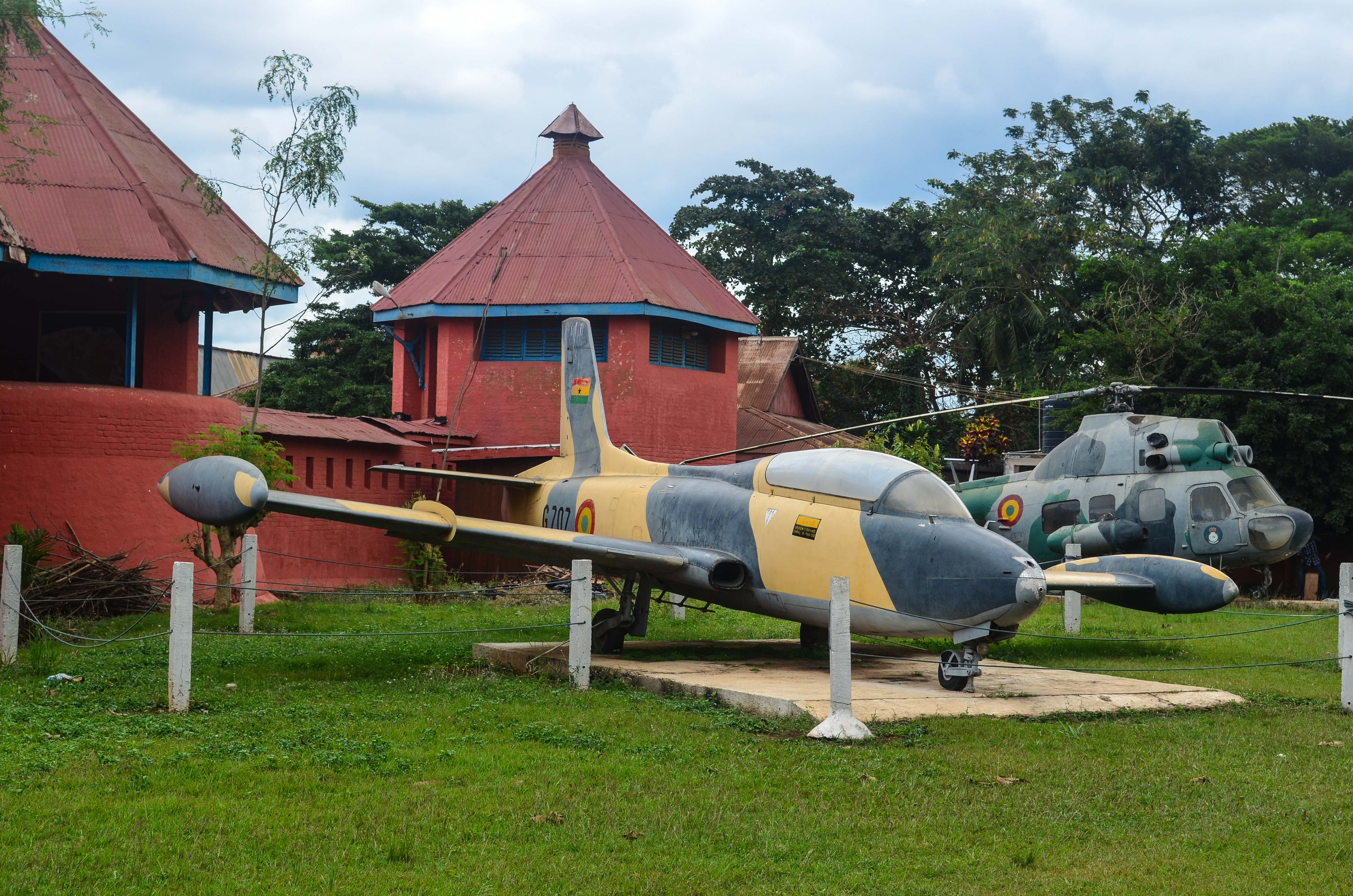
Ghana Air Force Aermacchi MB-326 at the Ghana Armed Forces (GAF) Museum in Kumasi, Ashanti Region, Ghana..

- Armed Forces Museum in Kumasi, Ashanti.

United States

- 474 – MB-326M on static display at the Estrella Warbirds Museum in Paso Robles, California.

== Specifications (MB-326G) ==
Orthographic projection of the Aermacchi MB-326

Cockpits

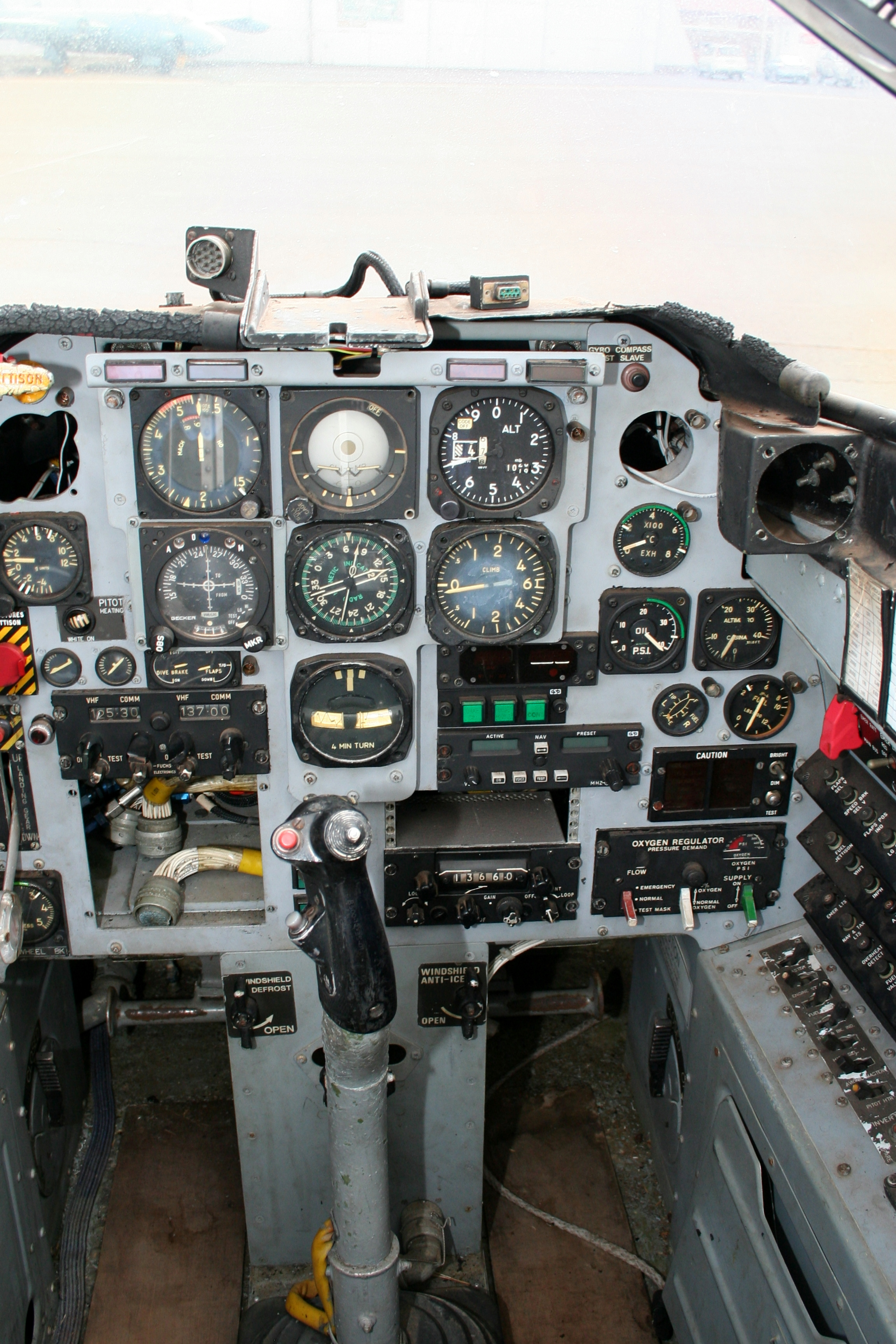
Front Cockpit

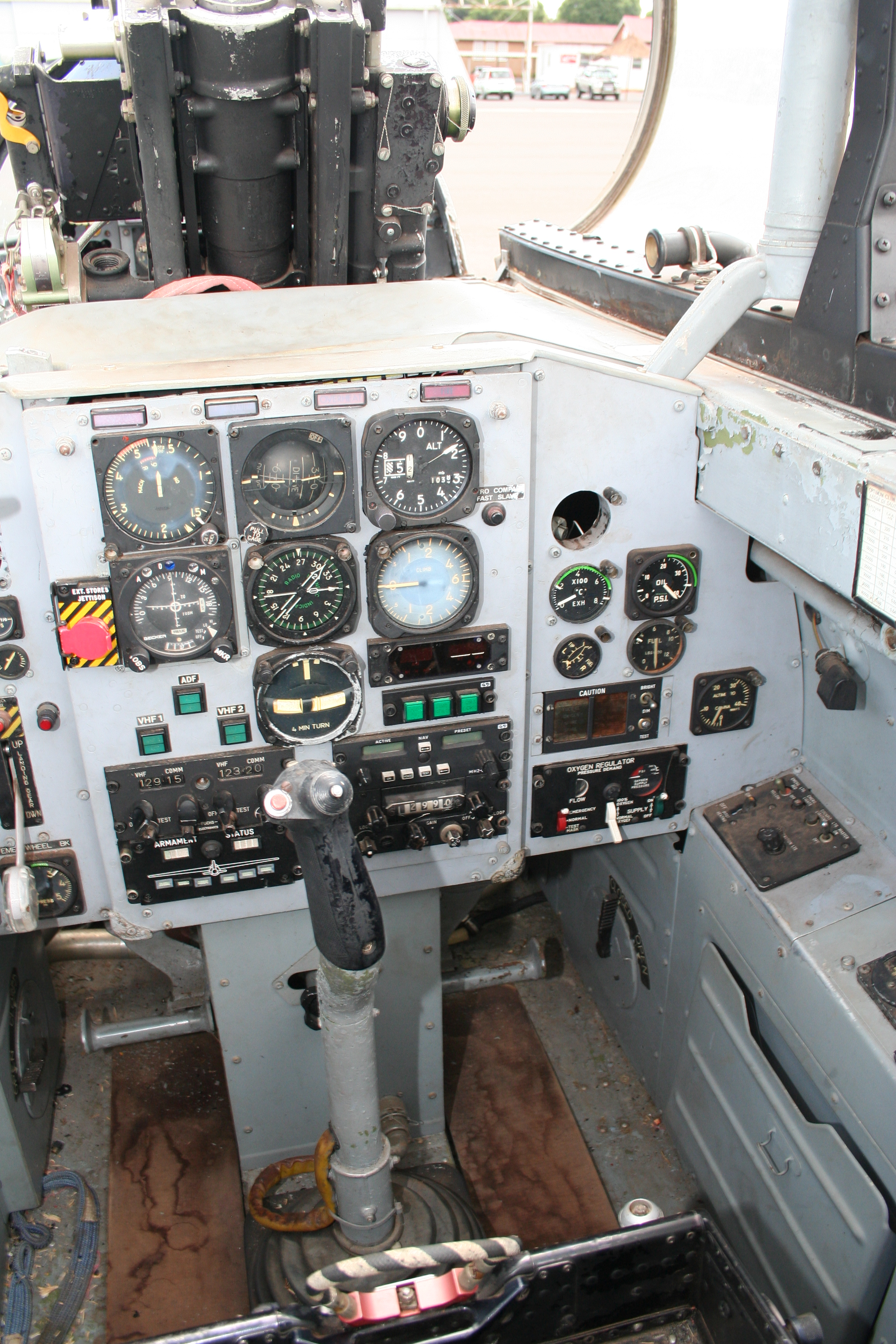
Rear Cockpit

Data from Jane's All The World's Aircraft 1969–70

General characteristics

- Crew: 2
- Length: 10.65 m (34 ft 11 in)
- Wingspan: 10.85 m (35 ft 7 in) with tip-tanks
- Height: 3.72 m (12 ft 2 in)
- Wing area: 19.35 m^{2} (208.3 sq ft)
- Airfoil: root: NACA 64A114; tip: NACA 64A212
- Gross weight: 2,685 kg (5,919 lb)
- Max takeoff weight: 4,577 kg (10,091 lb) full internal fuel, wing-tip and underwing tanks
- Fuel capacity: internals and tip-tanks: 1,392 L (368 US gal; 306 imp gal); internal fuel, wing-tip and underwing tanks: 2,056 L (543 US gal; 452 imp gal)
- Powerplant: 1 × Bristol Siddeley Viper 20 turbojet engine, 15.2 kN (3,410 lbf) thrust

Performance

- Maximum speed: 867 km/h (539 mph, 468 kn)
- Cruise speed: 797 km/h (495 mph, 430 kn)
- Never exceed speed: 871 km/h (541 mph, 470 kn) / M0.82 maximum diving speed
- Range: 1,850 km (1,150 mi, 1,000 nmi) Fuselage and tip-tanks with 113 L (30 US gal; 25 imp gal) reserve
- Ferry range: 2,445 km (1,519 mi, 1,320 nmi) Fuselage, under-wing and tip-tanks with 113 L (30 US gal; 25 imp gal) reserve
- Service ceiling: 14,325 m (46,998 ft)
- Rate of climb: 30.733 m/s (6,049.8 ft/min) at sea level
- Time to altitude: 6,100 m (20,000 ft) in four minutes and ten seconds

12,200 m (40,000 ft) in 13 minutes and five seconds

- Take-off run: 412 m (1,352 ft) in ISA conditions; 506 m (1,660 ft) in ISA + 25 °C (77 °F) conditions
- Take-off run to 15 m (49 ft): 555 m (1,821 ft) in ISA conditions; 704 m (2,310 ft) in ISA + 25 °C (77 °F) conditions
- Landing run from 15 m (49 ft): 631 m (2,070 ft) in ISA conditions at 3,175 kg (7,000 lb); 671 m (2,201 ft) in ISA + 25 °C (77 °F) conditions at 3,175 kg (7,000 lb)

Armament

- Guns: (optional) 2x 7.7 mm (0.303 in) machine-guns in the forward fuselage / various pylon-mounted gun pods
- Hardpoints: 6 with a capacity of Up to 4,000 lb (1,800 kg) total
- Rockets: (optional) 4x 6 kg (13 lb) or 7.5 kg (17 lb) rockets /various pylon-mounted rocket pods
- Missiles: (optional) 2x Nord AS.12 missiles
- Bombs: (optional) 4x 15 kg (33 lb) or 45 kg (99 lb)

Avionics
SFOM fixed gunsight or Ferranti LFS 5/102A gyro-gunsight

== See also ==
Related development

- Aermacchi MB-339

Aircraft of comparable role, configuration, and era

- Aero L-29 Delfín
- Fuji T-1
- HAL HJT-16 Kiran
- Lockheed T-33
- PZL TS-11 Iskra
- Soko G-2 Galeb
