= Space jet =

Space jet or spacejet or variation, may refer to:

- Mitsubishi SpaceJet, a failed project of a regional jet aircraft
- Club 328 (ICAO airline code: SDJ; callsign: SPACEJET), a UK charter airline
- KelliCraft Space Jet, a model airplane powered by Jetex
- Spaceplane, a spacecraft in the form of an airplane, sometimes called space jets in popular media and fiction
- Astrophysical jet, a jet in space, a jet that is an astronomical feature in deep space

== See also ==
- Hand-held maneuvering unit, an astronaut maneuvering device for spacewalks that is a jet gun
- Reaction engine, including space thrusters that uses jets of propellant
- MiGFlug, a company offering "space jet flights", flights to the "edge of space"
- SpiceJet (IATA airline code: SG; ICAO airline code: SEJ) Indian airline
- Batik Air, an Indonesian airline initially named Space Jet
- Jet space. a construction in differential topology
- Space (disambiguation)
- Jet (disambiguation)
