= MiGFlug =

Swiss aviation company

MiGFlug GmbH
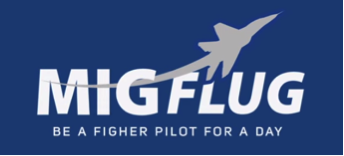
- Company type: Private
- Industry: Military Tourism, Spaceflight
- Founded: 2004
- Headquarters: Zurich, Switzerland
- Website: https://migflug.com

MiGFlug GmbH is a Zurich, Switzerland-based Aviation and Space Adventure company specialized in fighter jet flights. The company was founded in 2004 by current CEO Philipp Schaer and a business partner. As of 2025, offerings mainly included military jet trainer flights, historic fighter jet flights, and zero gravity flights, while in the past, MiGFlug also offered supersonic flights, edge of space flights, and suborbital space flights.

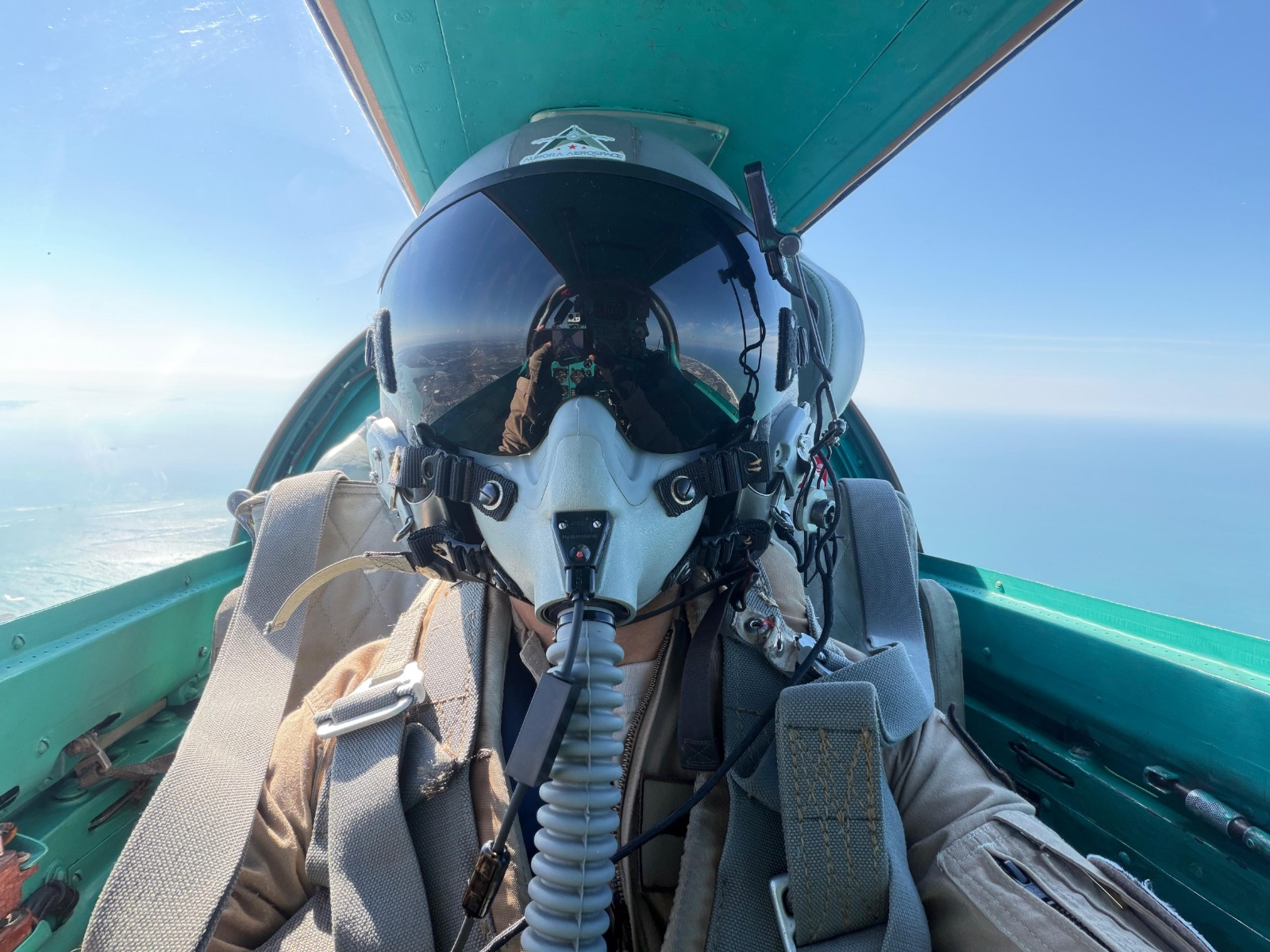
MiGFlug customer during a supersonic flight in the Mikoyan MiG-21 Fishbed - at Mach 1.3

== Company ==
Philipp Schaer is the current CEO of MiGFlug. He co-founded the company in 2004, with another student at the University of Zurich. They initially got the idea during a trip to Moscow, when bumping into a fighter pilot and convincing him to take them for a ride. A few days later that pilot smuggled them into a Russian airbase and took off with both of them. Later that year, the pair found a legal way to offer those flights in Russia using aircraft such as a Sukhoi Su-30 and the then-fastest fighter jet ever built, the Mikoyan-Gurevich MiG-25. The company is headquartered in Zurich, Switzerland. MiGFlug's main business is offering flights in military fighter jets for civilians, including supersonic flights. It started with jet flights from Ramenskoye Airport, Russia. MiGFlug has been shown on Lonely Planet's Year of Adventures with Ben Fogle, and broadcast on BBC. A number of notable passengers have flown in one of the company's fighter jets, including Anthony Bourdain, Zoltán Báthory, Joel Kinnaman, Miss India 2010 Manasvi Mamgai, TyDi, Josh Cartu, "Evil" Jared Hasselhoff, Alan Walker, Jake Paul, Klaas Heufer-Umlauf, Joko Winterscheidt, Jan Marsalek, Roberto Chevalier and Pauline Nordin.

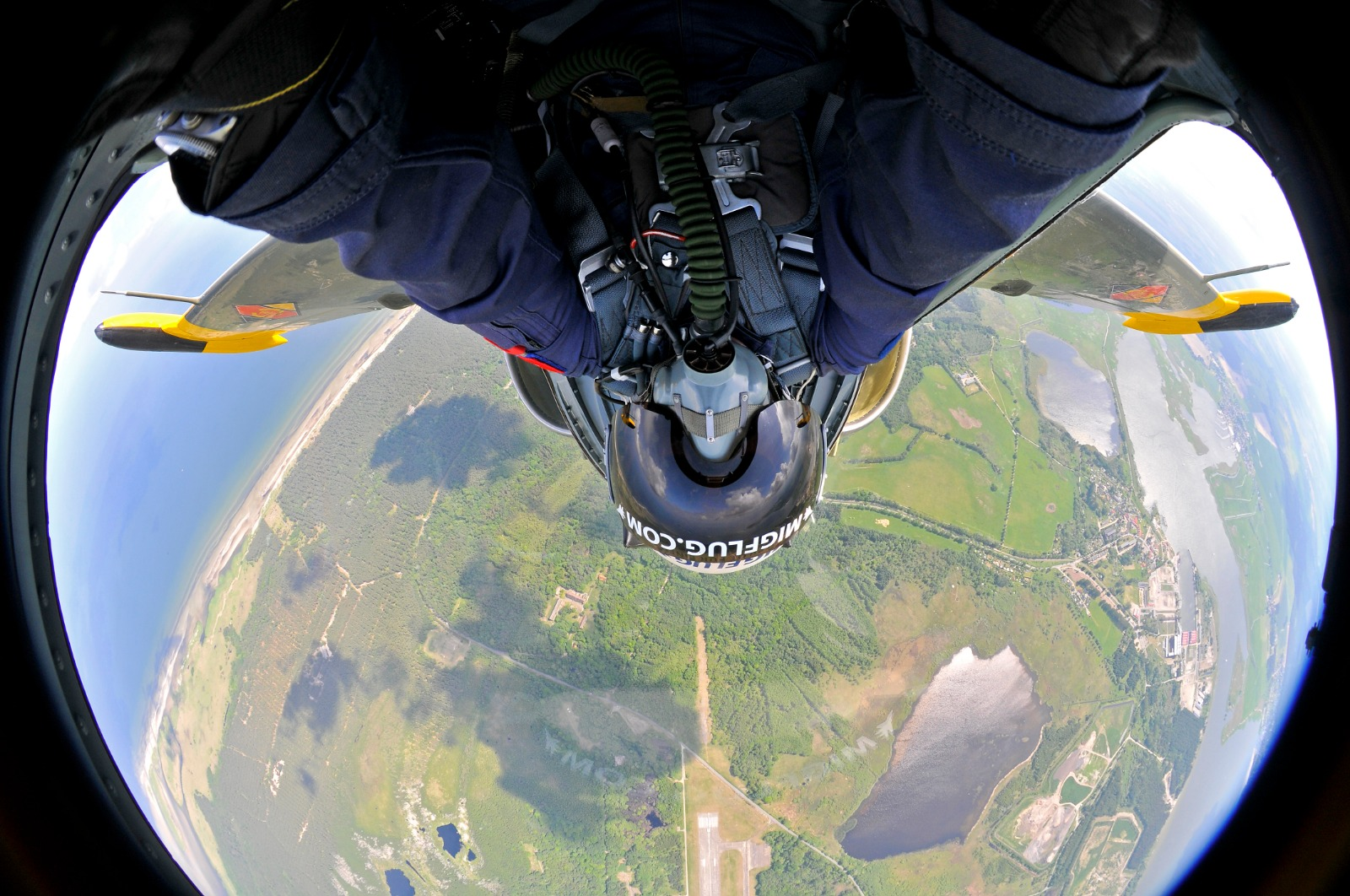
MiGFlug customer during a flight in the Aero L-39 Albatros

Several of MiGFlug's jets and pilots have appeared in movies, TV, and advertisements. For example, an L-39 appeared in the 1997 James Bond film Tomorrow Never Dies in the opening scene. MiGFlug has produced several Galileo episodes for ProSieben, as well as a zero gravity flight for Joko gegen Klaas. Porsche, Mercedes-Benz Diesel, OnePlus, IGN, and Swiss diary company Emmi AG produced advertisements or advertorials with MiGFlug.

MiGFlug's subsidiary GoAviator specializes in vintage flights, for example in warbirds and biplanes. MiGFlug also has a blog, covering aviation topics, with a focus on military aviation.

Since 2015, MiGFlug has offered formation jet flights with up to six passengers flying at the same time in close formation in an L-39.

MiGFlug organized flights to customers in wheelchairs, who enter the L-39 jets with the help of a forklift.

== Aircraft flown ==
Aircraft	Origin	Type	Variant	Notes	Flight Location
Combat Aircraft
Mikoyan MiG-21 Fishbed	Soviet Union	Supersonic jet fighter and interceptor aircraft	MiG-21 UM	Started 2025. Only supersonic flight that is currently available for civilians.	United States
Mikoyan MiG-29 Fulcrum	Soviet Union	Multirole combat aircraft, air superiority fighter	MiG-29 UB	Edge of space flight up to 20 km (12 mi). MiG-29 flights stopped in 2017 and haven't resumed since.	Russia
Lockheed F-104 Starfighter	United States	Interceptor aircraft, fighter-bomber aircraft	Lockheed F-104 Starfighter	Currently only for qualified pilots (with Private pilot licence or Commercial pilot licence).	United States
Mikoyan-Gurevich MiG-15 (NATO reporting name "Midget")	Soviet Union	Jet fighter aircraft	S-102	Built in Czech Republic in license as S-102 by Aero Vodochody	Czech Republic Canada
Hawker Hunter	United Kingdom	Fighter-bomber	Hunter Mk-58	Operated by Swiss Air Force as long as 1994. Hawker Hunter flights stopped in 2022 and haven't resumed since.	Switzerland
De Havilland Vampire	United Kingdom	Jet fighter aircraft	Vampire DH-115 Mk 55	Operated by Swiss Air Force as long as 1990	Switzerland United Kingdom Canada
BAC Strikemaster	United Kingdom	Attack aircraft			United Kingdom
Military Jet Trainer
Aero L-39 Albatros	Czech Republic	Military trainer aircraft, light ground attack	L-39C	Highest production number of any military jet trainers worldwide with 2900 units produced. The L-39 Albatros was the first second-generation jet trainer in production and the first trainer aircraft with a turbofan powerplant.	United States Czech Republic Germany Latvia France Switzerland Italy (earlier in Spain)
Aero L-29 Delfin	Czech Republic	Military trainer aircraft, light attack			Slovakia
SIAI-Marchetti S.211	Italy	Military trainer aircraft, light attack			Germany
Aermacchi MB-326	Italy	Advanced trainer/light attack		The MB-326 did not see service with the Italian Frecce Tricolori aerobatic team, who kept the Fiat G.91. They were later replaced by the MB-326 successor, the MB-339.	Italy
BAC Jet Provost	United Kingdom	Military trainer aircraft			Italy United Kingdom
Lockheed T-33	United States	Military trainer aircraft			Canada

== Aircraft flown in the past ==
Jets offered from Ramenskoye Airbase near Moscow in Russia from 2004-2006 included MiG-23, MiG-25, MiG-29 and the Su-27. Through a cooperation with Thunder City in Cape Town, South Africa, MiGFlug offered English Electric Lightning and Blackburn Buccaneer flights. MiGFlug also organized T-38 supersonic flights in the US for Galileo/ProSieben. From Sokol Airbase in Nizhny Novgorod, MiGFlug offered Mikoyan MiG-31 Foxhound flights from 2006-2010 and Mikoyan MiG-29 Fulcrum flights from 2006-2017 from Sokol Airbase, in Nizhny Novgorod. In Switzerland, MiGFlug offered Hawker Hunter flights from 2005-2022.

== Spacecraft and zero gravity ==
Weightless flight offers include the Ilyushin Il-76 from Star City (Zvyozdny gorodok) near Moscow and a Boeing 727 in the United States, through a cooperation agreement with the Zero Gravity Corporation. MiGFlug also had an arrangement to offer future sub-orbital spaceflights in the XCOR Lynx; Xcor filed for Chapter 7 bankruptcy in 2017.

== Planned future flights ==
According to monthly German aerobatic magazine FliegerRevue, MiGFlug plans to offer stratosphere flights, or so-called "Edge of Space" flights once again, in both MiG-21 and MiG-23 aircraft to replace the MiG-29, which has no longer been available since late 2017.
