= Austrian-Russian Friendship Society =

- Abbreviation: ORFG
- Formation: 2000
- Headquarters: Vienna, Palais Kaiserhaus, Wallnerstraße 3/5/28A
- President: Richard Schenz
- Website: http://orfg.net/

The Austrian-Russian Friendship Society (ORFG) is a networking society that hosts meetings between Austrians and Russians in areas such as agriculture, politics, education and culture.

The ORFG Network allows its members to participate in discussions with decision makers in the Russian Federation, providing a forum questions regarding visa applications and mediation of business contracts.

Next to the headquarters in Palais Kaiserhaus in Vienna, the society also has representation in Graz, as well as in Moscow and Krasnodar. A Salzburg branch opened in 2013.

== Organization ==
The ORFG represented by a presidium and an extended board. Dr. Richard Schenz has been president of this society since November 2015.

The ORFG currently has around 400 members in the form of personal, business and student memberships and another 4.500 interested people.

Since the founding of the club the ORFG has worked closely with the Russian embassy. The ambassador of the Russian Federation in Austria, currently Dmitrij Ljubinskij, is honorary president of the society.

== Areas of activity ==
Education, Culture and Tourism

The ORFG is currently discussing further integration which should enable to subsequent acquisition of Russian university graduates.

The ORFG offers information concerning cooperation and exchanges and assists in areas such as customs and visa applications. In addition to those services, the society also promotes the Platform RSPO, whose tagline is "Russischsprachiges Personal in Österreich" ("Russian speaking staff in Austria").

Economics and Politics

The club initiates travel for delegations to Russia and presents in event spaces in Russian regions

At the quarter-annual Jour Fixes there are guest speakers who hold discussions on Economics, Politics, Education and Culture from Austria and Russia - such as the Secretary of State for Integration (Staatssekretär für Integration) Sebastian Kurz and the President of Russian Railways, Vladimir Yakunin.

Related events are hosted within this form for further networking and related interests.

== Origins of the ORFG ==
The Soviet society has organized long trips abroad provides for the economic and cultural exchanges between both countries. However, the society ceased to exist after the Fall of the Soviet Union in 1991. For nine years there were no such exchanges between Russia and Austria.

A six-member committee was formed in 2000, which became the foundation of the ORFG, where these relationships began to strengthen. The first president was the General Secretary Florian Stermann. Businesses in both Russia and Austria profited from trade between these two countries. Austrian to Russia exports increased from 654 million to 2.97 billion Euros between 2000 and 2008.

Russia is Austria's most important gas supplier. In return, Austria provides Russia with engineering products, equipment and motor vehicles.

The Beginnings of Austria-Russian relationships

In the 16th century the first relationships between both countries had already arisen. Siegmund von Herberstein undertook several lengthy diplomatic missions to Russia. These strengthened in the 18th century under Peter the Great. The relationships would become closer in 1772, as Poland was split between its neighbors during the Seven Years' War.

In the second half of the 19th century, despite several treaties, there was strong tensions between the two countries. Relationships began to develop again after the end of World War II, especially through the Soviet Friendship Society and have now intensified through the Austrian-Russian Friendship Society.

== Presidium (Profession) ==
- Dr. Richard Schenz (Vice-President of the Austrian Economic Chambers )
- NR Dr. Christoph Matznetter (Vice-President of Austrian Economic Chambers)
- S.E. Dmitrij Ljubinskij (Ambassador of the Russian Federation to Austria), Honorary President
- Dr. Ludwig Scharinger, Honorary President
