= Naval Aviation Museum =

Naval Aviation Museum may refer to:

- National Naval Aviation Museum in Florida, USA
- Canada Aviation and Space Museum in Ottawa, Canada
- Naval Aviation Museum (India) in Vasco da Gama, India
- Naval Aviation Museum (Argentina) in Buenos Aires, Argentina
