= Arbeiterwille =

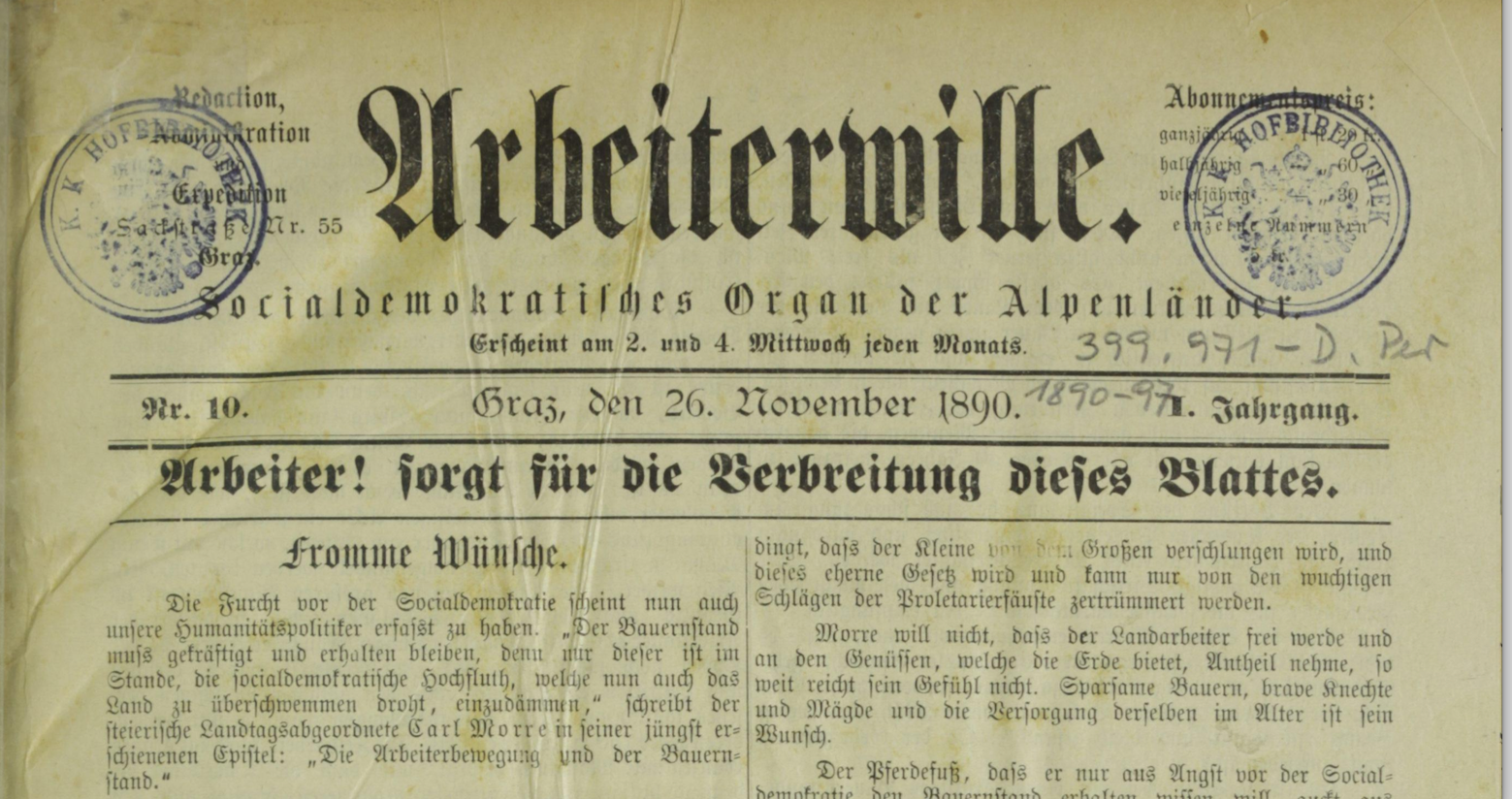
Banner form issue of 26 November 1890

Arbeiterwille was social democratic paper published in Graz, Styria, Austria, from 1890 to 1934.

Arbeiterwille first appeared on 9 July 1890 and continued to be published until 12 February 1934 when the defeat of the Schutzbund in the Austrian Civil War led to its suppression.

== Academic studies ==
(in German)

- Friedrich Kleinschuster: Der "Arbeiterwille" von 1907 bis 1914. Die Geschichte der steirischen Sozialdemokratie und ihres Zentralorgans von den ersten allgemeinen Reichsratswahlen 1907 bis zum Ausbruch des 1. Weltkrieges. Graz 1978 (Graz, University, unprinted philosophical dissertation, 19 July 1978)
- Friedrich Kleinschuster: Zur Geschichte der steirischen Arbeiterpresse. Der "Arbeiterwille" von den Anfängen bis zum Ersten Weltkrieg. In: Robert Hinteregger, Karl Müller, Eduard Staudinger (eds.): Auf dem Weg in die Freiheit. Anstöße zu einer steirischen Zeitgeschichte. Kuratorium der Wanderausstellung "Für Freiheit, Arbeit und Recht", Graz 1984, pp. 131–162
- Helmut W. Lang (ed.): Österreichische Retrospektive Bibliographie (ORBI). Reihe 2: Österreichische Zeitungen 1492–1945. Band 2: Helmut W. Lang, Ladislaus Lang, Wilma Buchinger: Bibliographie der österreichischen Zeitungen 1621–1945. A–M. Bearbeitet an der Österreichischen Nationalbibliothek. K. G. Saur, München 2003, ISBN 3-598-23384-1, pp. 111–112
