= 8 Squadron SAAF =

8 Squadron
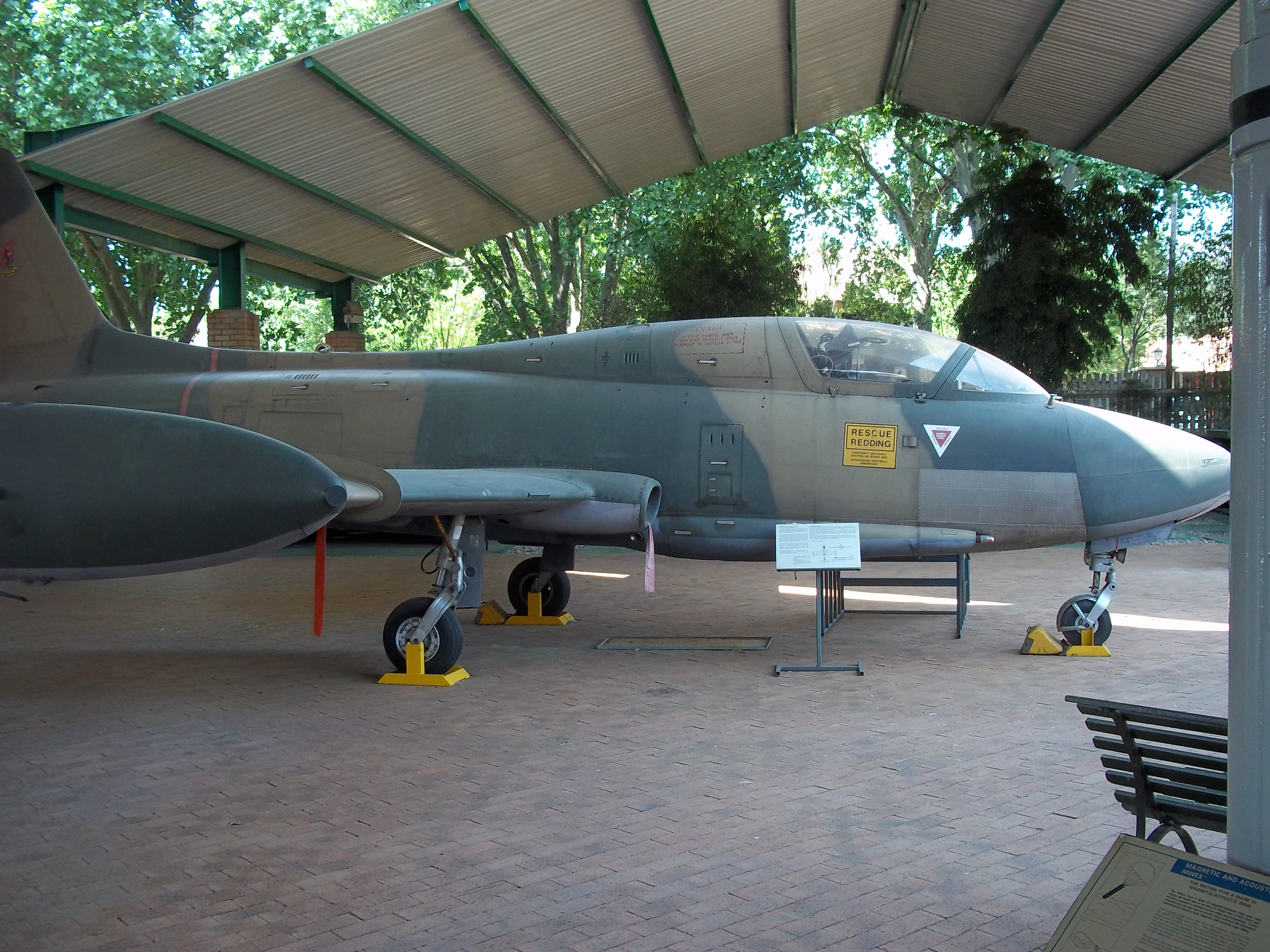
- Impala Mk.II as flown by the Squadron from 1974
- Active: 1942; 1951-2001
- Country: South Africa
- Branch: South African Air Force
- Role: Fighter (1942); Weapons Training (1951–1973); Light Attack / COIN (1973–2001)
- Motto: "Usque Ad Mortem" (Until Death)

Insignia
- 8 Squadron Insignia

8 Squadron was a South African Air Force squadron during World War II and was again active between 1951 and 2001. During this second period, it was designated at different times as either a Citizen Force or Permanent Force squadron and was disbanded on 31 March 2001.

== History ==
It was formed in February 1942 and was equipped with Hawker Furies released from 43 Squadron RAF but was disbanded seven months later in August 1942 and was never operationally deployed during the war.

On 1 January 1951 the squadron was re-constituted at Bloemspruit as the Citizen Force element of 24 Squadron flying Harvards. In 1957 the squadron was assigned the role of presenting the Harvard Weapons Course and was split between permanent and citizen force flights. The Permanent Force Flight was responsible for the weapons course training, a role retained until 1970.

In 1973 the unit was converted to Impala Mk I's and in November 1974 became the first squadron to be equipped with Impala Mk IIs. The squadron again reverted to a full Permanent Force staffing structure and was employed in the light attack role during the South African Border War. (Note: 30mm cannons and capacity of up to 1 814 kg bombs or rocket pods (Williams (1997) pp.79))

During this time, the squadron was one of the few Air Force squadrons to have a pilot honoured with the Honoris Crux Silver Medal, awarded to Maj. R.C.M. (Dick) Lewer for bravery. (Note: Awarded for close air support to an ambushed 31 Bn company close to Xangongo, deployed as a stopper group for the opening of Operation Protea. Lewer repeatedly attacked a large force of SWAPO/FAPLA elements who had pinned down a SADF company in his single seat Impala. Operating alone and at night, his continued attacks allowed the company to withdraw to safety. (Bagshaw (1990), pp 21))

In 1994 the unit was designated as one of the four remaining fighter units after the 1994 Defense Force rationalisation program. and in April 1999 the squadron was relocated from its long standing base in Bloemfontein to AFB Hoedspruit. It was disbanded on 31 March 2001 when the Impalas were retired from service.

== Aircraft ==
Aircraft flown by 8 Squadron
Note: Aircraft type photographs may not necessarily represent aircraft of the same mark or actual aircraft belonging to the squadron.
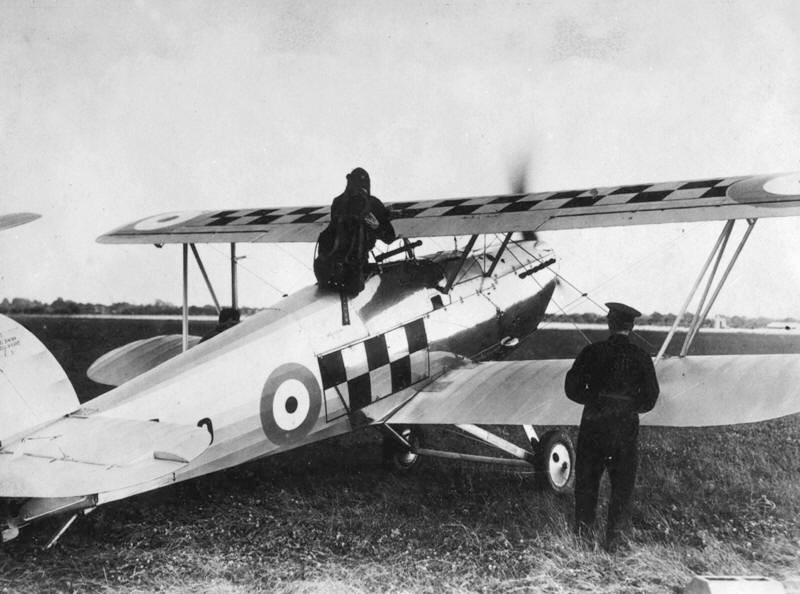
Hawker Fury
1942

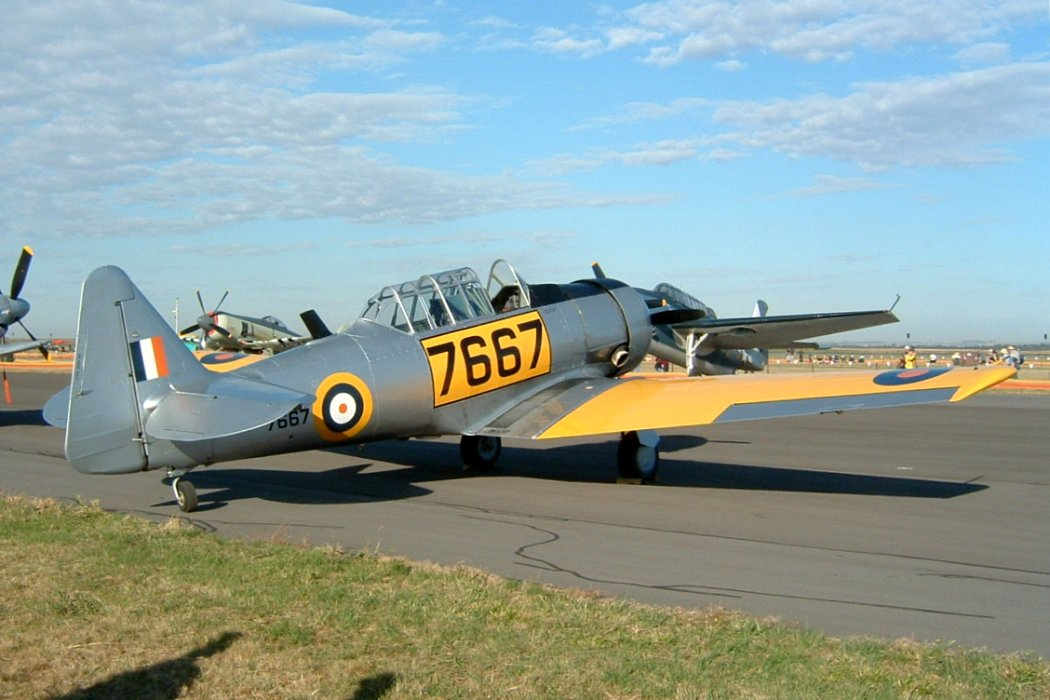
North American T-6 Harvard)
1951-1973

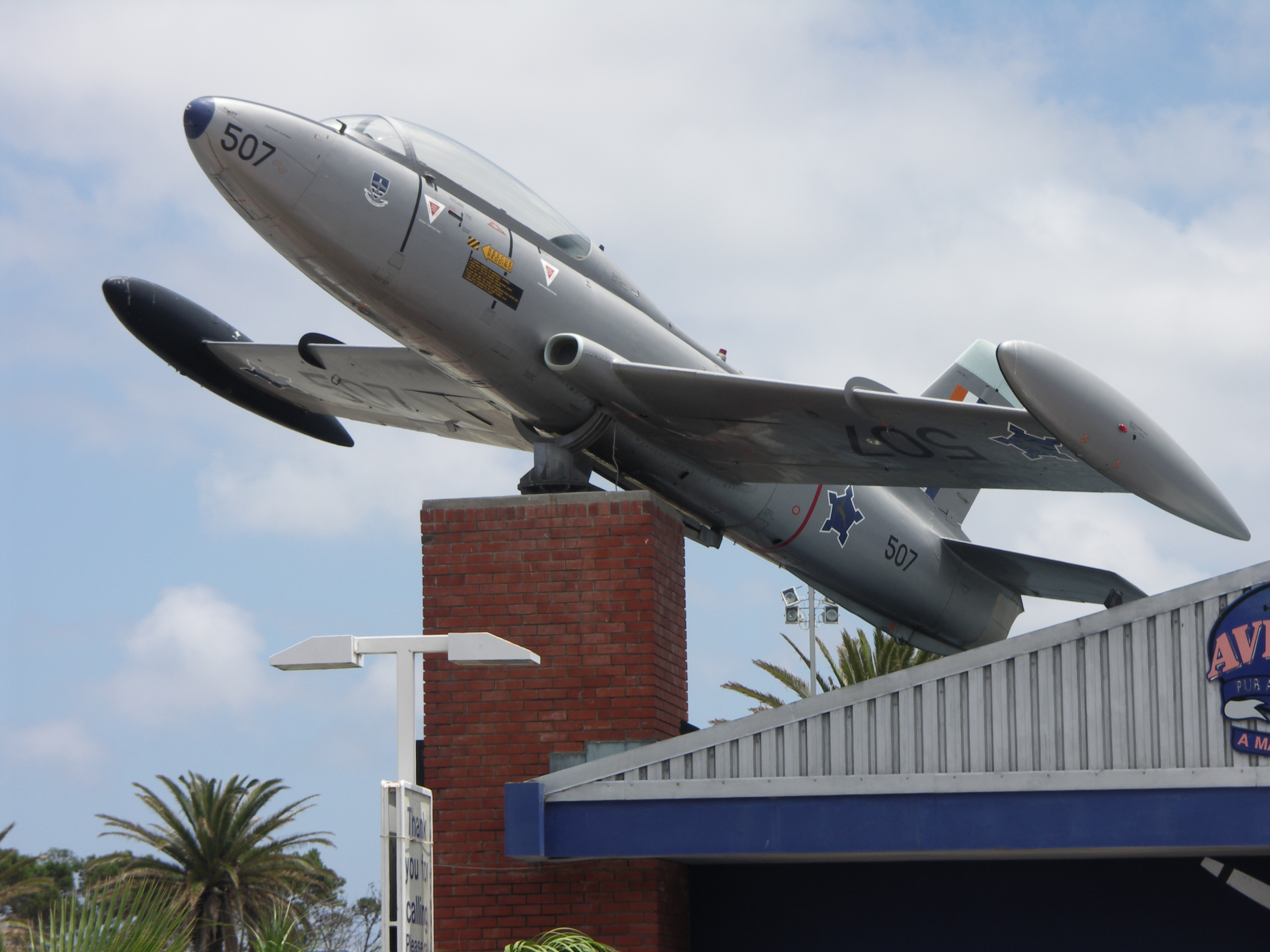
Atlas Impala Mk I
1973-1974

=== References ===
Footnotes

Citations
