= List of squadrons of the South African Air Force =

The following is a list of squadrons of the South African Air Force. The list includes both current and past squadrons of the South African Air Force.

== Current squadrons ==
Squadron	Role	Base	Aircraft
2 Squadron	Air Superiority	Air Force Base Makhado	Gripen C, Gripen D
15 Squadron	Air Superiority	Air Force Base Durban	A109 LUH, BK 117, Oryx
19 Squadron		Air Force Base Hoedspruit	A109 LUH, Oryx
87 Helicopter Flying School	Training	Air Force Base Bloemspruit	A109 LUH, BK 117, Oryx
17 Squadron	Rotary	AFB Swartkop	A109 LUH, Oryx
21 Squadron	VIP Transport	Air Force Base Waterkloof	550/1 Citation II, Boeing 737-7ED (BBJ), Falcon 50, Falcon 900B
22 Squadron	Rotary	Air Force Base Ysterplaat	Oryx, Super Lynx 300
28 Squadron	Medium transport	Air Force Base Waterkloof	C-130B/BZ Hercules
35 Squadron	Maritime	Air Force Base Ysterplaat	C47-TP Turbo Dakota
41 Squadron	Light transport	Air Force Base Waterkloof	208 Caravan, 300 Super King Air, B200C Super King Air, PC-12
44 Squadron	Light transport	Air Force Base Waterkloof	C 212 Aviocar
60 Squadron	Heavy transport	Air Force Base Waterkloof	
80 Air Navigation School	Training	Air Force Base Ysterplaat	
85 Combat Flying School	Training	Air Force Base Makhado	Hawk Mk 120
SA Air Force College	Training	Other	
Central Flying School	Training	Air Force Base Langebaanweg	PC-7 Mk II (Astra)
Test Flight and Development Centre	Logistic support services	Air Force Base Overberg	Cheetah D, Hawk Mk 120, PC-7 Mk II (Astra)
Joint Air Reconnaissance Intelligence Centre	Logistic support services	Air Force Base Waterkloof	
10 Squadron	Reconnaissance/Targeting	N/A	Seeker 400
101 Squadron	Light transport	Air Force Base Hoedspruit	
102 Squadron	Light transport	Air Force Base Makhado	
104 Squadron	Light transport	AFB Swartkop	
105 Squadron	Light transport	Air Force Base Durban	
106 Squadron	Light transport	Air Force Base Bloemspruit	
107 Squadron	Light transport	Air Force Base Bloemspruit	
108 Squadron	Light transport	Air Force Station Port Elizabeth	
110 Squadron	Light transport	Air Force Base Ysterplaat	
111 Squadron	Light transport	Air Force Base Waterkloof	
SAAF Museum Historic Flight	Training	AFB Swartkop	Alouette II (Museum), C-47 Dakota (Museum), CL.13B Sabre Mk 6 (Museum), D.H.87B Hornet Moth (Museum), DHC-1 Chipmunk T MK 10, Explorer, Fi-156c-7 Storch, Harvards (Museum), Mirage IIIBZ (Museum), Mirage IIICZ (Museum), P-51D Mustang (Museum), P166S Albatross (Museum), Prentice T Mk 1, Provost T Mk 52 (Museum), S-55C (Museum), SA-330L Puma (Museum), Shackleton MR.3 (Museum), Spitfire Mk IXe (Museum)
1 Air Servicing Unit	Logistic support services	Air Force Base Waterkloof	
2 Air Servicing Unit	Logistic support services	Air Force Base Langebaanweg	
3 Air Servicing Unit	Logistic support services	Air Force Base Makhado	
5 Air Servicing Unit	Logistic support services	Air Force Base Waterkloof	
10 Air Depot	Logistic support services	Air Force Station Thaba Tshwane	
18 Deployment Support Unit	Logistic support services	Air Force Mobile Deployment Wing	
92 Tactical Airfield Unit	Logistic support services	Air Force Mobile Deployment Wing	
140 Squadron	Air defence	Air Force Mobile Deployment Wing	
142 Squadron	Air defence	Air Force Mobile Deployment Wing	
500 Squadron	Security services	Air Force Mobile Deployment Wing	
501 Squadron	Security services	Air Force Mobile Deployment Wing	
502 Squadron	Security services	TEK Base	
503 Squadron	Security services	Air Force Station Thaba Tshwane	
504 Squadron	Security services	Air Force Base Waterkloof	
505 Squadron	Security services	Air Force Base Ysterplaat	
506 Squadron	Security services	Air Force Base Bloemspruit	
508 Squadron	Security services	Air Force Base Durban	
514 Squadron	Security services	Air Force Base Hoedspruit	
515 Squadron	Security services	Air Force Base Makhado	
525 Squadron	Security services	Air Force Base Overberg	
526 Squadron	Security services	Air Force Base Langebaanweg	
Air Force Gymnasium	Training	Air Force Base Hoedspruit	
68 Air School	Training	TEK Base	
Bushveld Airspace Control Sector	Air defence	Other	
Lowveld Airspace Control Sector	Air defence	Air Force Base Hoedspruit	
Mobile Communications Unit	Logistic support services	Air Force Mobile Deployment Wing	
Rapid Deployment Air Operations Team 43	Logistic support services	Other	
Rapid Deployment Air Operations Team 46	Logistic support services	Other	
Air Publications Service Centre	Logistic support services	Air Force Base Waterkloof	
SAAF Band	Logistic support services	Air Force Mobile Deployment Wing	
Command and Control School	Training	Air Force Base Waterkloof	
School of Cookery	Training	Air Force Mobile Deployment Wing	
Air Force Command and Control School	Training	Air Force Base Hoedspruit	
Airspace Control Unit	Air defence	AFB Swartkop	
Central Photographic Institute	Logistic support services	Air Force Base Waterkloof	
Combined Auction Centre	Logistic support services	Other	
Ellisras Reporting Post	Air defence	Other	
SAAF Police	Security services	Other	
SAAF Telecommunications Centre	Logistic support services	Air Force Base Waterkloof	
Electronic Warfare Centre	Logistic support services	Air Force Base Waterkloof	
16 Squadron	Rotary attack	Air Force Base Bloemspruit	Rooivalk
6 Air Servicing Unit	Logistic support services	Air Force Base Bloemspruit	
15 Squadron - 'C' Flight		Air Force Station Port Elizabeth	BK 117
516 Squadron	Security services	Other	
SAAF Procurement Unit	Logistic support services	Air Force Mobile Deployment Wing	

== Disbanded squadrons ==
Squadron:	Based at:
1 Squadron	N/A
3 Squadron	N/A
4 Squadron	N/A
5 Squadron	N/A
6 Squadron	N/A
7 Squadron	N/A
8 Squadron	N/A
11 Squadron	N/A
12 Squadron	N/A
24 Squadron	N/A
25 Squadron	N/A
27 Squadron	N/A
30 Squadron	N/A
31 Squadron	N/A
40 Squadron	N/A
42 Squadron	N/A
86 Multi-Engine Flying School	N/A
88 Maritime Operational Training School	N/A
89 Combat Flying School	N/A
4 Air Servicing Unit	Air Force Mobile Deployment Wing
7 Air Servicing Unit	Air Force Base Hoedspruit
120 Squadron	N/A
112 Commando Squadron / 1 SWA Squadron	N/A
114 Commando Squadron	N/A
109 Squadron	N/A
103 Squadron	N/A
26 Squadron	N/A
84 Light Aircraft Flying School	N/A
Fire Training School	N/A

== See also ==
- South African Air Force
- List of bases of the South African Air Force
- List of aircraft of the South African Air Force
