= List of bases of the South African Air Force =

The following is a list of bases of the South African Air Force.

== Current Bases ==
Base	Location	Squadrons	Aircraft
Air Force Base Bloemspruit	29°05′38″S 26°18′14″E	106 Squadron, 107 Squadron, 16 Squadron, 506 Squadron, 6 Air Servicing Unit, 87 Helicopter Flying School	A109 LUH, BK 117, Oryx, Rooivalk
Air Force Base Durban	29°58′07″S 30°56′52″E	105 Squadron, 15 Squadron, 508 Squadron	A109 LUH, BK 117, Oryx
Air Force Base Hoedspruit	24°21′17″S 31°03′01″E	101 Squadron, 19 Squadron, 514 Squadron, 7 Air Servicing Unit, Air Force Command and Control School, Air Force Gymnasium, Lowveld Airspace Control Sector	A109 LUH, Oryx
Air Force Base Waterkloof	25°49′48″S 28°13′21″E	1 Air Servicing Unit, 111 Squadron, 21 Squadron, 28 Squadron, 41 Squadron, 44 Squadron, 5 Air Servicing Unit, 504 Squadron, 60 Squadron, Central Photographic Institute, Command and Control School, Electronic Warfare Centre, Joint Air Reconnaissance Intelligence Centre, SAAF Telecommunications Centre	208 Caravan, 300 Super King Air, 550/1 Citation II, B200C Super King Air, Boeing 737-7ED (BBJ), C 212 Aviocar, C-130B/BZ Hercules, CN 235, Falcon 50, Falcon 900B, PC-12
Air Force Base Makhado	23°09′36″S 29°41′48″E	102 Squadron, 2 Squadron, 3 Air Servicing Unit, 515 Squadron, 85 Combat Flying School	Gripen C, Gripen D, Hawk Mk 120
Air Force Base Langebaanweg	32°58′08″S 18°09′55″E	2 Air Servicing Unit, 526 Squadron, Central Flying School	PC-7 Mk II (Astra)
Air Force Base Overberg	34°33′17″S 20°15′02″E	525 Squadron, Test Flight and Development Centre	Cheetah D, Hawk Mk 120, PC-7 Mk II (Astra)
AFB Swartkop	25°48′25″S 28°09′52″E	104 Squadron, 17 Squadron, Airspace Control Unit, SAAF Museum Historic Flight	A109 LUH, Alouette II (Museum), C-47 Dakota (Museum), CL.13B Sabre Mk 6 (Museum), D.H.87B Hornet Moth (Museum), DHC-1 Chipmunk T MK 10, Explorer, Fi-156c-7 Storch, Harvards (Museum), Mirage IIIBZ (Museum), Mirage IIICZ (Museum), Oryx, P-51D Mustang (Museum), P166S Albatross (Museum), Prentice T Mk 1, Provost T Mk 52 (Museum), S-55C (Museum), SA-330L Puma (Museum), Shackleton MR.3 (Museum), Spitfire Mk IXe (Museum)
Air Force Station Thaba Tshwane		10 Air Depot, Air Publications Service Centre	
Air Force Base Ysterplaat	33°54′04″S 18°29′00″E	110 Squadron, 22 Squadron, 35 Squadron, 505 Squadron, 80 Air Navigation School	C47-TP Turbo Dakota, Oryx, Super Lynx 300
TEK Base		502 Squadron, 68 Air School	
Valhalla		503 Squadron, Fire Training School, SAAF Band, School of Cookery	
Air Force Mobile Deployment Wing		140 Squadron, 142 Squadron, 18 Deployment Support Unit, 4 Air Servicing Unit, 500 Squadron, 501 Squadron, 92 Tactical Airfield Unit, Mobile Communications Unit	
Air Force Station Port Elizabeth	33°59′24″S 25°36′37″E	108 Squadron, 15 Squadron - 'C' Flight	BK 117

== Disbanded Bases ==
Base:
AFB Ysterplaat Detached (Cape Town IAP)
Air Force Base Pietersburg

== See also ==
- South African Air Force
- List of aircraft of the South African Air Force
- List of squadrons of the South African Air Force
