= 89 Combat Flying School =

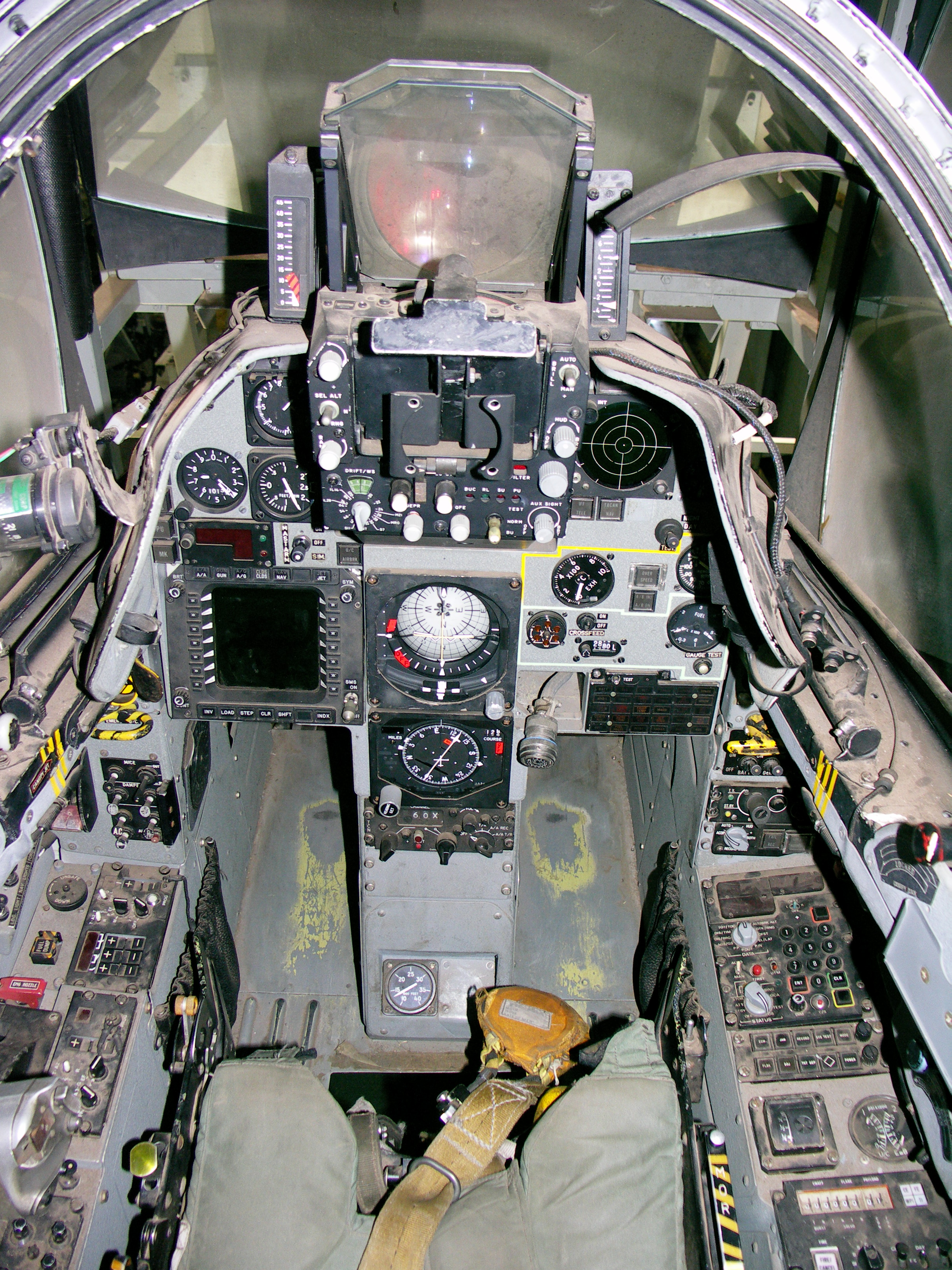
- Cheetah D flight simulator
- Active: 1 July 1986 - 29 November 1992
- Country: (South Africa)
- Branch: South African Air Force
- Role: Fighter jet training
- Garrison/HQ: AFB Pietersburg
- Motto: "Exercitati delendo" (We train to kill)

Aircraft flown
- Fighter: Atlas Cheetah D

89 Combat Flying School is a disbanded unit of the South African Air Force, active from 1986 to 1992. The unit was formed on 1 July 1986 from the Mirage Flight of 85 Combat Flying School at AFB Pietersburg and its main role was to train aircrew to fly the Dassault Mirage aircraft.

On 26 July 1986, the school began receiving the dual seat Atlas Cheetah D aircraft and started offering a Cheetah conversion course to pilots already qualified on the Atlas Impala aircraft. The school was the first unit of the South African Air Force to receive the Cheetah D.

89 Combat Flying School began merging with 2 Squadron SAAF on 6 November 1992, to become Training Flight, 2 Squadron. Flying operations were conducted by 2 Squadron from 6 November 1992 and 89 Combat Flying School was disbanded on 29 November 1992. All remaining personnel and equipment was transferred to AFB Louis Trichardt during January 1993.
