= Atlas Cheetah =

South African fighter aircraft

Cheetah
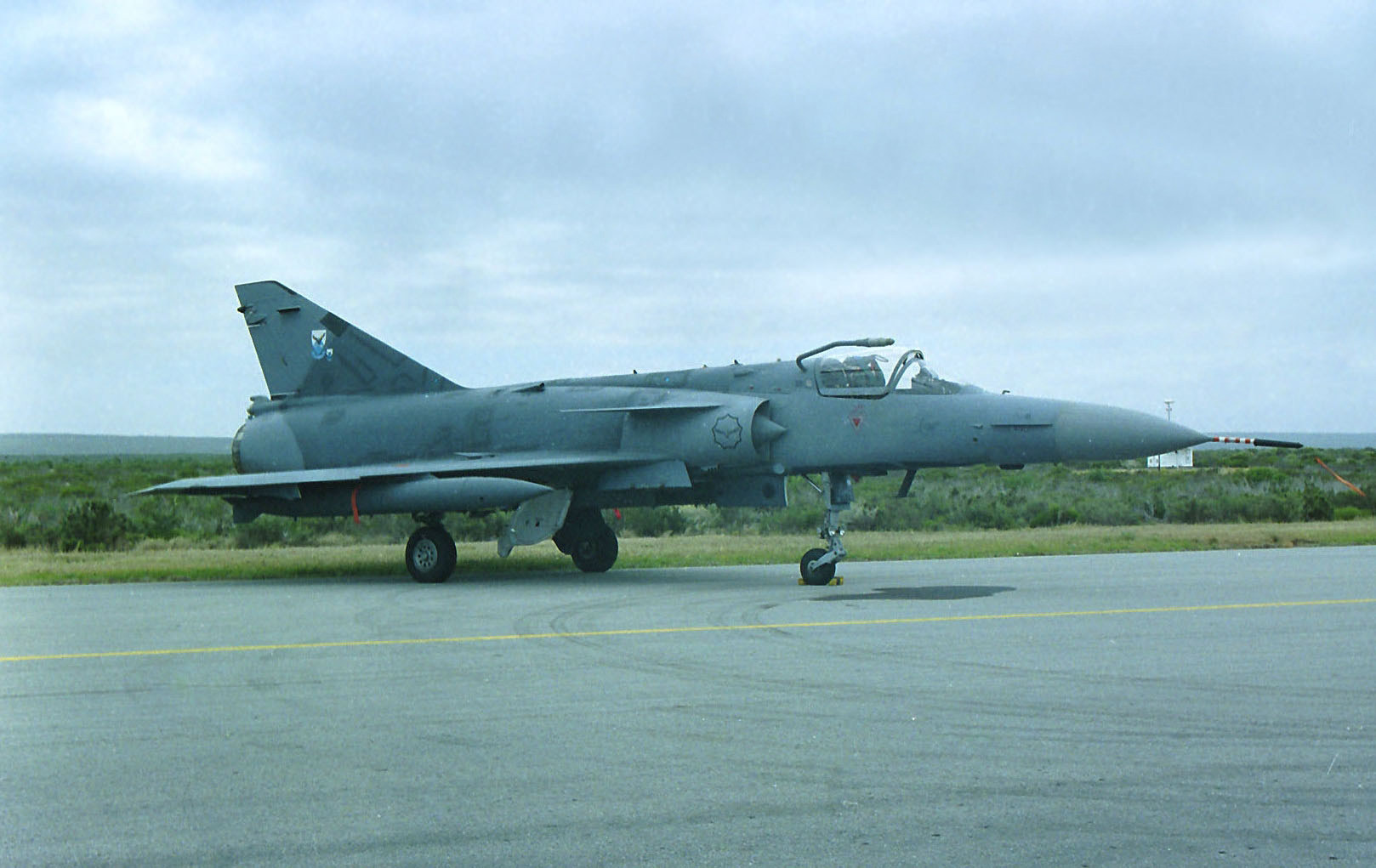
- A South African Air Force Cheetah C

General information
- Type: Fighter aircraft
- National origin: South Africa
- Manufacturer: Atlas Aircraft Corporation
- Status: Active with private companies
- Primary users: South African Air Force (historical) Chilean Air Force (historical); Ecuadorian Air Force (historical)
- Number built: 38 (C), 16 (D), 16 (E)

History
- Introduction date: 1986
- Developed from: Dassault Mirage III; IAI Nesher; IAI Kfir

The Atlas Cheetah is a South African fighter aircraft produced by the aviation company Atlas Aircraft Corporation (later Denel Aeronautics). It was primarily developed and operated by the South African Air Force (SAAF).

The Cheetah was developed amid the Border War of the 1980s as a major upgrade of the French-built Dassault Mirage III fleet operated by the SAAF. The programme integrated technology from the Israeli-built IAI Kfir, which had been derived from the Mirage 5/IAI Nesher. The upgrade programme, which was known as Project Cushion, produced three variants; the two-seat Cheetah D, the single-seat Cheetah E, and the single-seat Cheetah C. All three models were inducted into the SAAF, functioning for a time as the service's most capable fighter and strike aircraft. A single Cheetah R, intended for aerial reconnaissance, was built as a prototype, but this variant never entered service.

During 1992, the Cheetah E model was withdrawn from SAAF service; both the Cheetah Cs and Cheetah Ds were retired during April 2008, having been being replaced by the Swedish-built Saab Gripen. Since its retirement by the SAAF, a limited number have still operated in South Africa as flight test aircraft. Some have been exported, such as to the Ecuadorian Air Force (EAF) as a source of spare parts. The privately owned company Draken International intends to use the Cheetah as an adversarial aircraft for combat training services in the United States.

== Development ==
=== Background ===
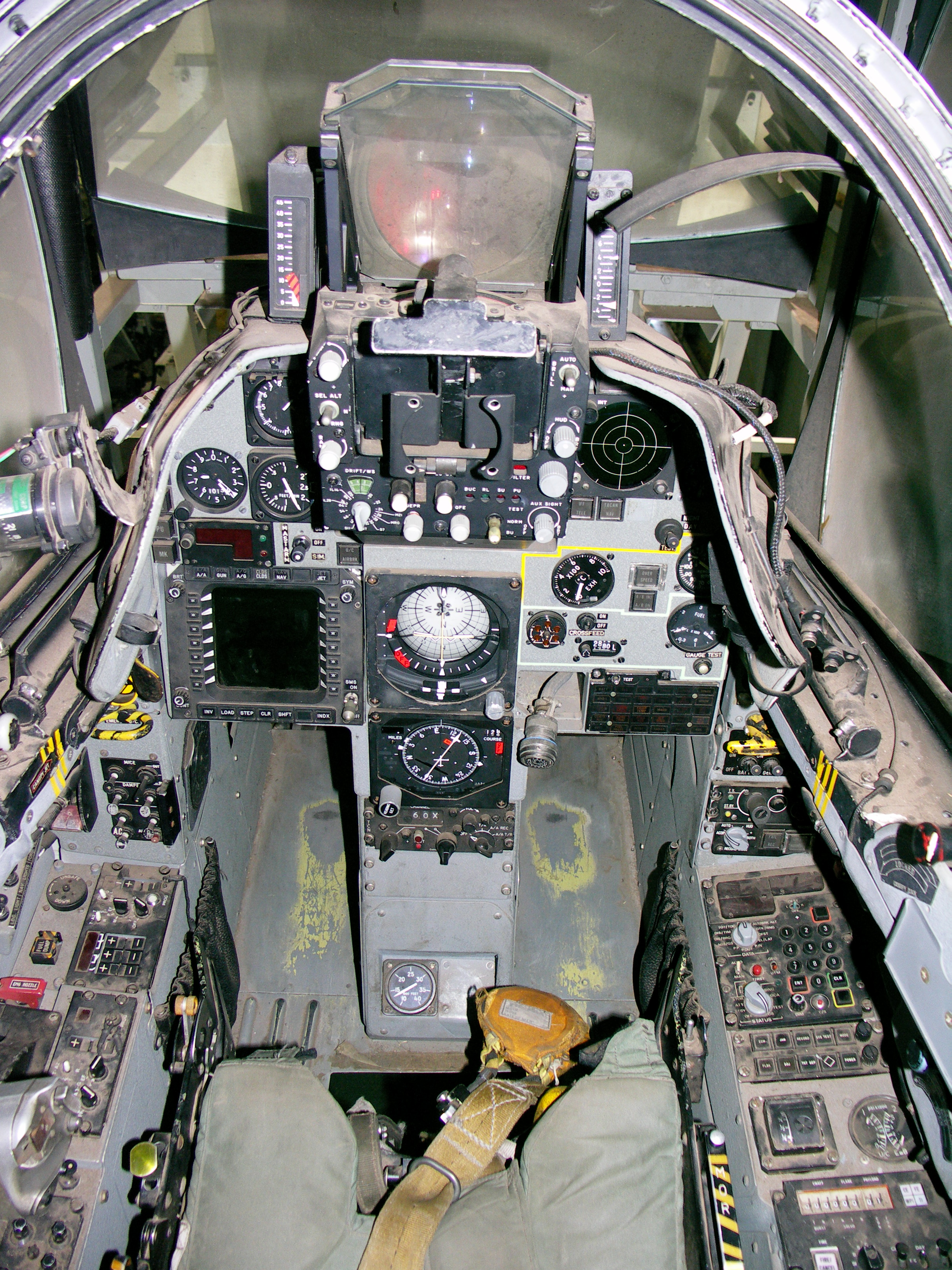
Cockpit of the Cheetah D flight simulator

The Atlas Cheetah programme originated during the 1980s out of South Africa's requirement for more capable fighter and strike aircraft. At the time, the SAAF was confronted by the need for more advanced aircraft to attain an edge over the ever-more sophisticated Soviet-built aircraft, such as the MiG-23, that were being supplied to both Angolan and Cuban forces. These aircraft were being deployed against South Africa's own military during the lengthy conflict commonly known as the Border War. Furthermore, the increasing cost of maintenance due to international sanctions and the increasing age of existing aircraft in the SAAF's inventory also needed to be addressed. As a consequence of the arms embargo being imposed at the time under United Nations Security Council Resolution 418, South Africa was prevented from purchasing new aircraft from almost any other country in the world; accordingly, the upgrading of existing aircraft became the only viable option available.

==== Companies involved ====
By the 1980s, the South African aviation industry had attained the level of technical capability to make a large and sophisticated upgrade possible. These factors contributed to the SAAF making the decision to authorise an extensive upgrade programme involving one of the existing types in service. Furthermore, the development of an advanced indigenously developed fighter, known as the Atlas Carver, was also initiated around the same time.

During the 1980s, the SAAF's fast jet fleet consisted of multiple variants of the French-built Dassault Mirage III (EZ/CZ/BZ/DZ/D2Z/RZ/R2Z) and Mirage F1 (AZ/CZ) aircraft. Although the Mirage F1 was considered to be the most modern aircraft type in the fleet, deliveries having commenced during 1977, the type comprised the primary element of South Africa's air defence and strike fleet. Withdrawing the Mirage F1 to perform an extensive upgrade would have necessitated opening a major gap in that nation's air defence and strike capability, which was deemed to be unacceptable by senior SAAF officials.

In addition, various features could be integrated into the Mirage III from related, pre-existing upgrades that had been made to similar aircraft, such as the Mirage 5/IAI Nesher/IAI Kfir lineage and Mirage IIING project, the latter being based on the Mirage III. Consequently, the SAAF's Mirage III fleet was chosen as the recipient for this upgrade programme, which was initially referred to as Project Cushion.

The work was carried out by Atlas Aviation (formerly Atlas Aircraft Corporation and lately Denel Aviation). Atlas was also able to acquire skilled technicians with relevant knowledge from Israel, following the cancellation of an advanced Israeli fighter project, known as the IAI Lavi. Prior to the programme, Israel had already established itself as a source of military technology for South Africa, cumulating in the Israel–South Africa Agreement. The two nations had engaged in multiple arrangements specifically involving SAAF's Mirage III fleet, including the procurement of spare parts by Israel and the embedding of Israelí advisors within SAAF units. According to some aviation publications, foreign aviation company Israel Aircraft Industries had been involved in at least the initial stages of the upgrade, and that some components were sourced directly from Israel. IAI themselves have acknowledged their involvement in the joint development of related projects, such as an active-radar development programme. According to ACIG, a total of five IAI Nesher fighters may have been acquired from the Israeli Air Force for Cheetah trials and later absorbed into the existing fleet. According to aviation author John W. Golan, a potentially large number of IAI Kfirs may have been provided to South Africa for the programme.

==== Details ====
The upgrade consisted of a complete refurbishment of the airframe down to zero flight hours condition; to achieve this, roughly 50% of the original airframe was reportedly replaced, according to statements made by Atlas. Aerodynamic changes included the installation of non-moving canards just aft of the engine intakes, the Cheetah D & E models were fitted with slightly smaller (70%) canards than that of the Cheetah C and IAI Kfir. Other airframe alterations included two additional stores pylons at the wing roots, an aerial refuelling probe, new ejection seats, a new main wing spar along with a new "drooping" leading edge and a dog-tooth incision on each wing, modern elevons controlled by a twin computer-based flight control system, and strakes on the nose to improve the Cheetah's high-Angle of attack (AoA) performance. Reportedly, the Cheetah could carry three times as much ordinance (in terms of weight) as the Mirage III while possessing superior agility as well. However, according to aviation author Dick Lord, the Mirage F1 remained capable of superior performance in areas such as fuel efficiency, ease of handling, and range.

In terms of its electronics and systems, the Cheetah was provisioned with new avionics, radar set, electronic warfare (EW) and self-protection suites. As many of these were accommodated within the nose, this necessitated its lengthening to provide more internal space. The EW suite incorporated a missile approach warning system and radar warning receivers, while the aircraft's self-protection system, which consisted of electronic jammers and chaff/flare dispensers that were automatically activated. An indigenously developed helmet-mounted sight (HMS) and an oversized head-up display (HUD) were also installed in the cockpit, along with other sophisticated cockpit instrumentation. The upgrade involved the fitting of a new and capable Pulse-Doppler radar system. While both the Cheetah D and the Cheetah E were still equipped with the SNECMA Atar 9C turbojet engine, the Cheetah C used the more powerful Atar 9K50.

== Operational history ==
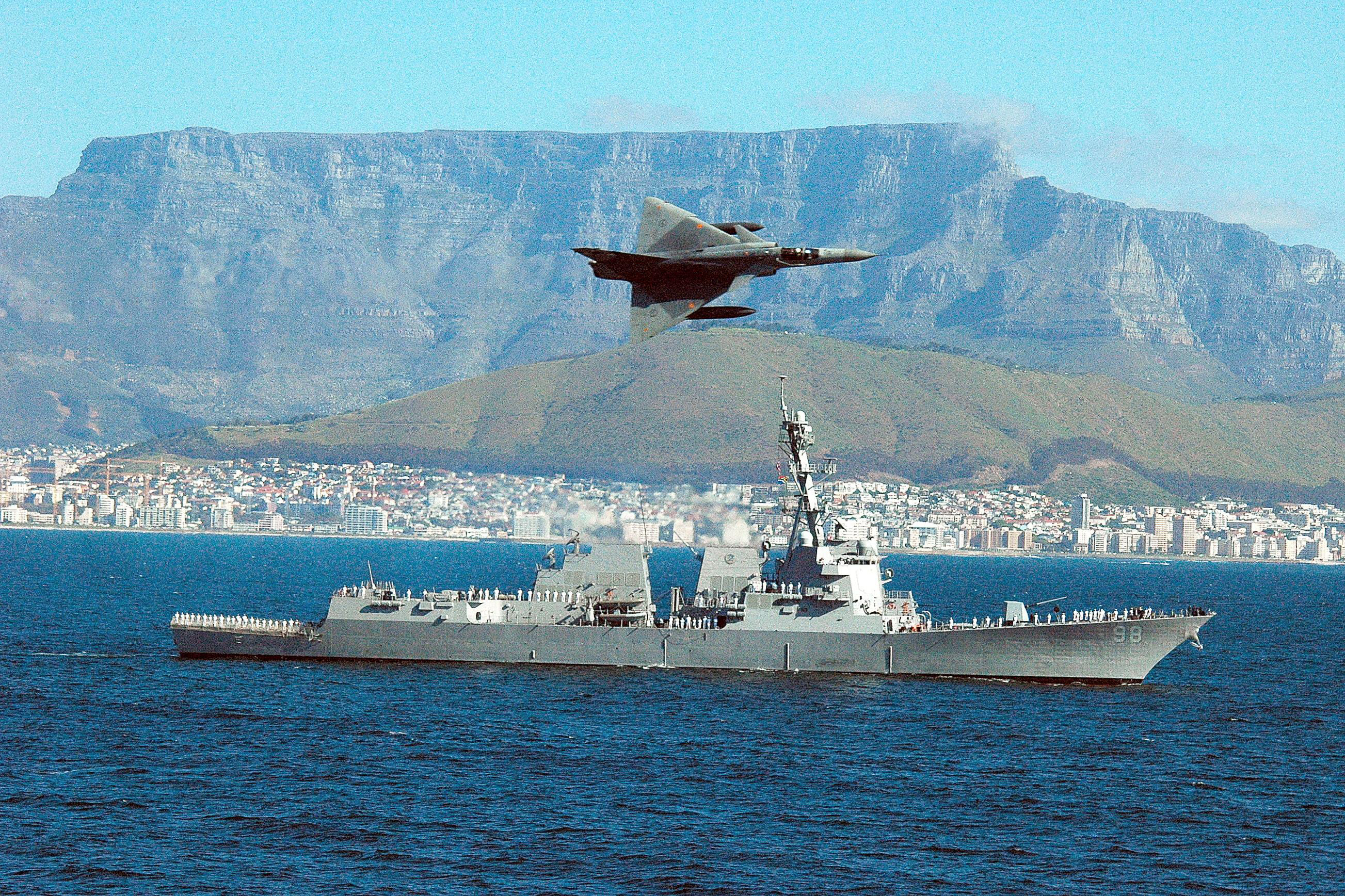
A Cheetah flying over USS Forrest Sherman in Table Bay

On 16 July 1986, the first Cheetah D was publicly unveiled although a number of Cheetah Ds had already entered service with 89 Combat Flying School at AFB Pietersburg. During 1987, the Cheetah D was declared to be operational with the SAAF. The second and third aircraft to be delivered to Atlas were both Mirage IIIEZs, following their conversion of the Cheetah E configuration, these aircraft went into service with 5 Squadron at AFB Louis Trichardt. Early experiences with the Cheetah found it to be markedly more difficult to successfully perform in-flight refuelling than the Mirage F1 fleet. While the type had been developed in response to the increasing pressure of the Border War, there is no evidence that any Cheetahs of any variant actually conducted offensive operations in the final years of the conflict.

By 1991, 16 of each type were reported in service when the Cheetah D and E conversion lines closed. This same year, the production of the Cheetah C started, the first such aircraft being rolled out during January 1993. All the Cheetah Cs entered service with 2 Squadron, which was also stationed at AFB Louis Trichardt. The type continued to be used during the post-Apartheid peacetime, but became increasingly obsolete in comparison to international fighter aircraft over the course of two decades. The Cheetah was eventually withdrawn from SAAF service during the 2000s in favour of newly procured Swedish Saab JAS-39 Gripens, which has succeeded the Cheetah as the service's principal fast jet fighter.

Retired Cheetahs were typically stored rather than scrapped, and during 2003, South Africa began seeing buyers for these surplus aircraft. Accordingly, the Cheetah has been exported to various customers. In South America, Ecuador decided to acquire the type. During late 2017, it was announced that a privately owned company, Draken International, had made a deal with Denel Aviation to procure much of the ex-SAAF fleet; the company reportedly intended to use the Cheetah as an aggressor aircraft for dissimilar combat training services for customers in the United States.

== Variants ==
=== Cheetah C ===
The Cheetah C was the final development in the Cheetah series and was the only fighter aircraft in service with the SAAF until replaced by the Swedish-built Saab JAS 39 Gripen during 2008. In addition to the upgrades described above, the Cheetah C incorporated more sophisticated avionics and navigation suite and an improved pulse-doppler multi-mode radar (ELTA). The aircraft was also fitted with a data link and updated versions of the helmet-mounted sight, HUD and improved HOTAS controls.

Other improvements included the fitting of a single-piece wrap-around windshield in place of the previous three-piece version, a revised in-flight refuelling probe with less external piping, new undercarriage and suspension, the deletion of the wing fences, an Atar 9K50 engine and a new nose to incorporate the more sophisticated electronics and radar.

Like the Cheetah D, the Cheetah C was capable of delivering precision-guided munitions (PGMs), ranging from laser-guided bombs (LGBs), to GPS-guided weapons and TV-guided bombs. It also had the capability of using stand-off air-to-ground weapons such as the MUPSOW and TORGOS. In addition, it was able to carry a wide range of air-to-air weapons including the V4 R-Darter radar-guided missile and the infra-red homing V3S-Snake (Rafael Python 3) and U-Darter.

=== Cheetah D ===
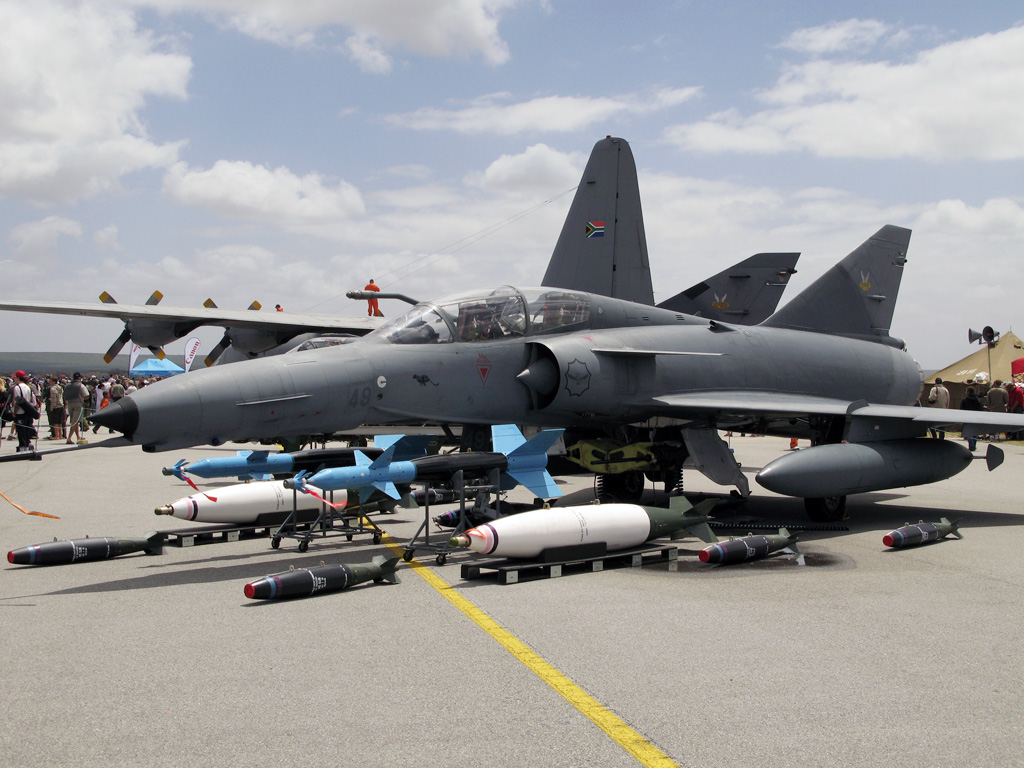
A Cheetah D in 2007

The Cheetah D was the sole two-seater variant, and was predominantly used as a trainer for pilots converting to the Cheetah C. It also had a secondary attack capability, including the ability to deliver PGMs. Under Project Recipient, 10 Cheetah Ds were re-engined with the Atar 09K50C-11, replacing their original Atar 09C engines. After the engine modification, the remaining aircraft received an avionics upgrade to bring them to the same standard as the Cheetah C. The original three piece front windshield was also replaced with a one-piece wraparound version.

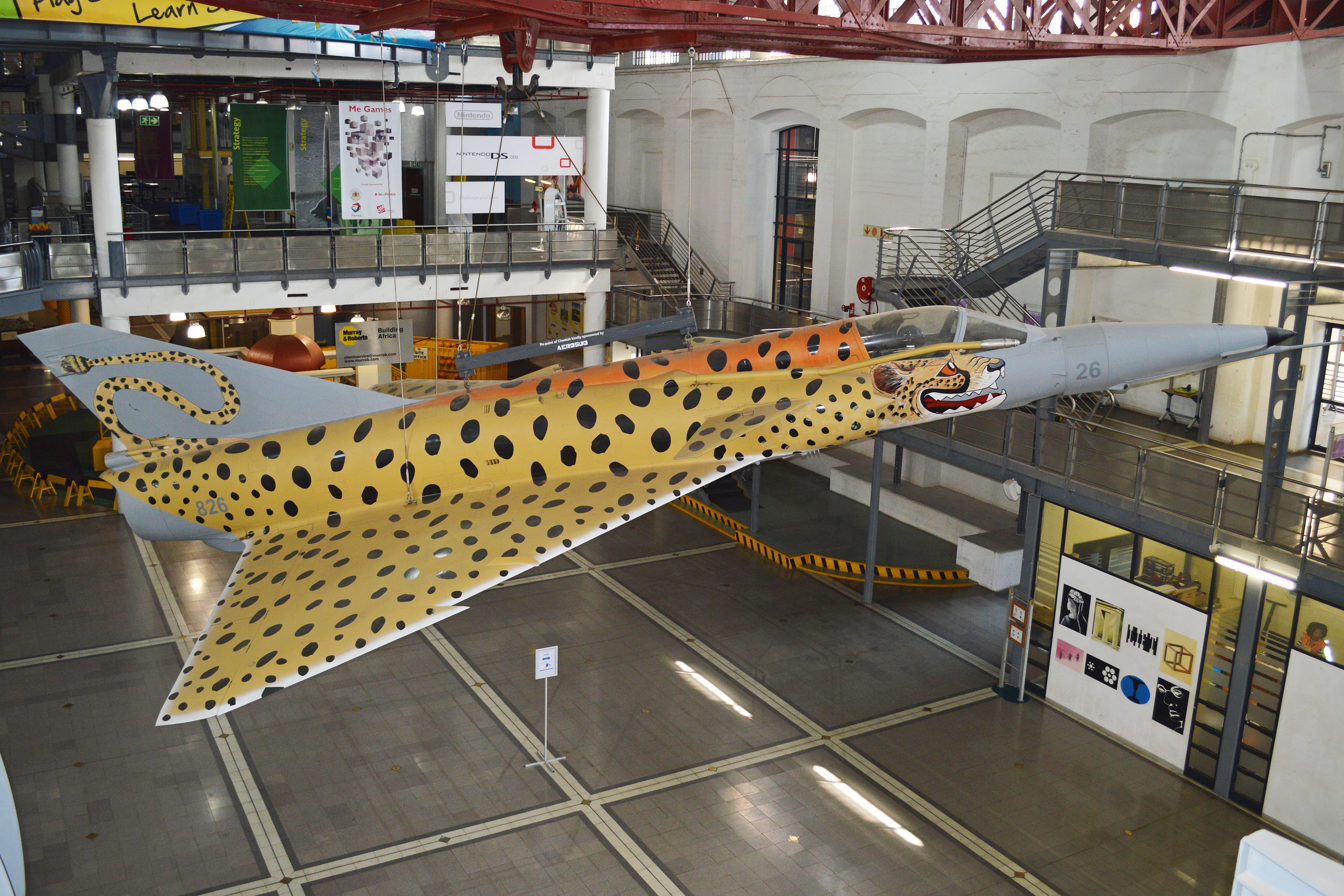
A Cheetah E on static display.

Cheetah D No.845 was based at the Test Flight and Development Centre (TFDC) as a systems testing aircraft and used in the development of the Denel Dynamics MUPSOW stand-off weapon. Denel used two Cheetah Ds for testing (844 and 847). The former was Denel's standard systems testing aircraft, while the latter was used in the evaluation of the SMR-95 engine, a development of the Soviet-built Klimov RD-33. The performance increase offered by the Russian engine was impressive, but a combination of budget cuts and problems with the aircraft's centre of gravity contributed to the program's termination.

These aircraft were retired from service in 2008, as the first Saab JAS-39D Gripen began to be delivered to the SAAF.

=== Cheetah E ===
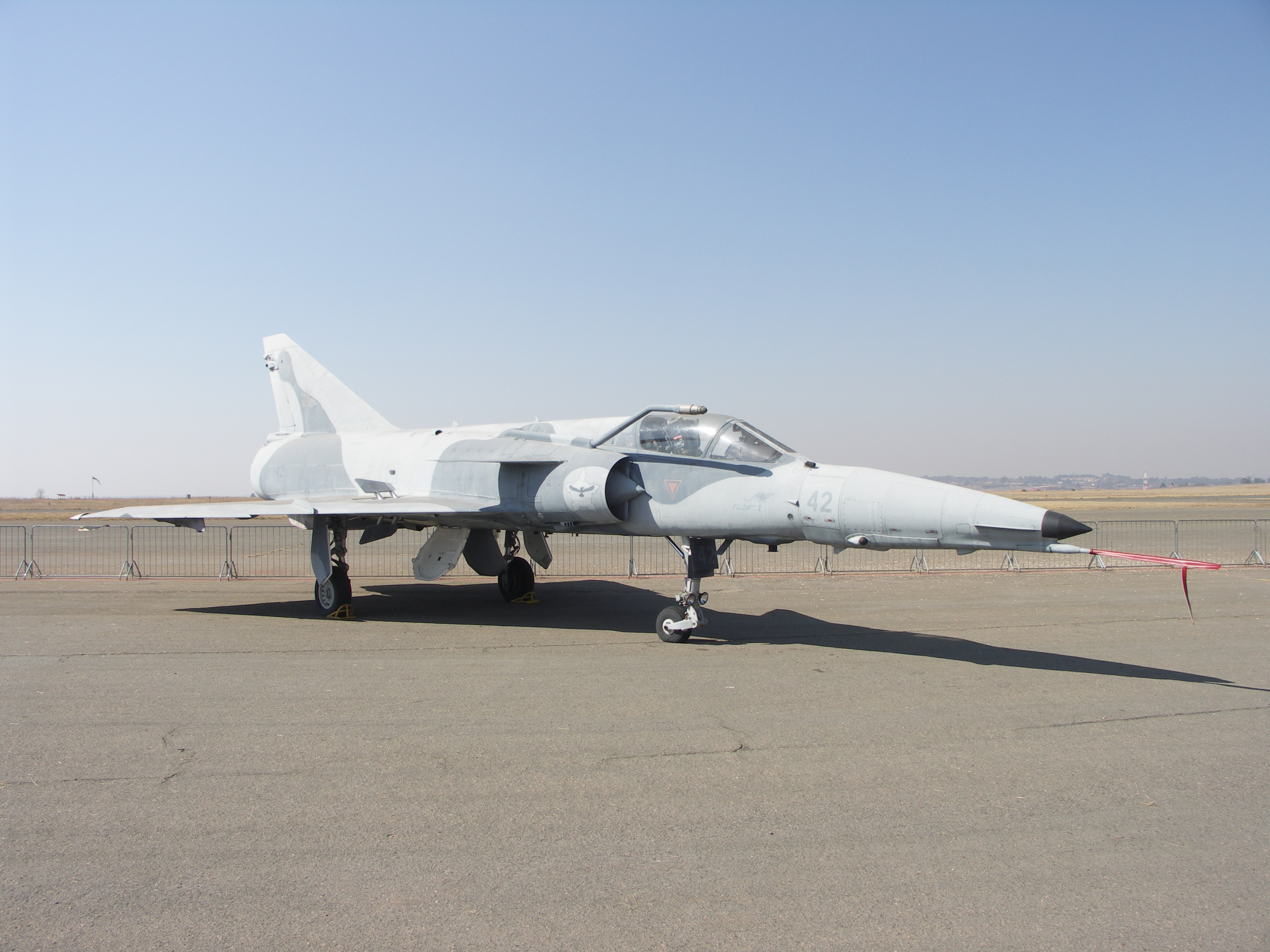
Cheetah E at the SAAF Museum, Swartkop, Pretoria

The single-seater Cheetah E was developed as an interim fighter for use in the period before the Cheetah Cs became operational. It was fitted with a comparatively simple avionics suite and radar and retained the Atar 9C-3 engine. Its typical mission was as a standby interceptor, whereby a minimum of two aircraft armed with two V3B (later V3C) missiles, would be on permanent alert status in case of an attack from the north.

All aircraft were placed into storage with the final example (No.842) painted in a non-standard camouflage scheme and used for systems testing. No.842 is currently with the SAAF Museum, and is stored at AFB Swartkop. In 2003, Chile purchased five of the mothballed aircraft (Numbers 819, 820, 827, 832 and 833) and indicated its desire to purchase seven more aircraft (numbers 822, 823, 825, 828, 829, 831 and 834) subject to the agreement of a suitable purchase price. The Chilean Air Force (FACh) used the Cheetah E airframes as a source of spares for its similar ENAER Pantera aircraft until these planes were retired in late 2006.

=== Cheetah R ===
The Cheetah R was a feasibility study into an extension of the Cheetah upgrade programme to include a specialist reconnaissance model. An Atar 9K50-engined Mirage IIIR2Z, (855), was chosen as the airframe for the upgrade. In addition to the airframe refurbishment, 855 received a new nose design and the same radar as used in the Cheetah E, the twin DEFA 30mm cannons were removed and it was the only Cheetah type to not receive an in-flight refuelling probe. The SAAF decided not to proceed with the Cheetah R programme and 855 was assigned to the Atlas Advanced Combat Wing (ACW) where it was used as a testing and development aircraft. It was decided that rather than developing a dedicated reconnaissance airframe, that the Vinten Vicon 18 Series 610 reconnaissance pod would be used on the Cheetah C variant to provide reconnaissance capabilities.

== Operators ==
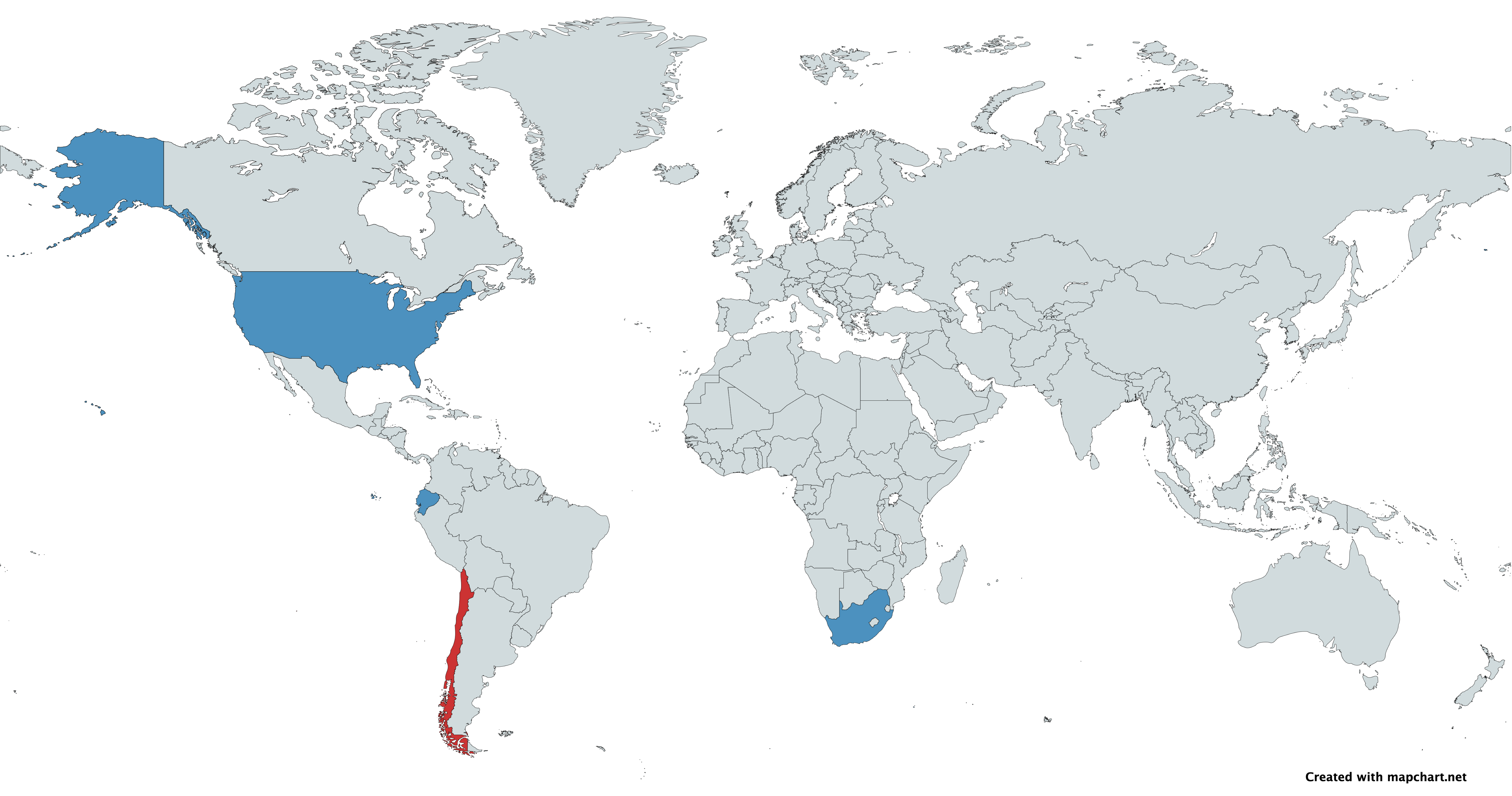
Map with Cheetah operators in blue

South Africa

- Denel Aviation – As of October 2012, the state-owned enterprise operates two Cheetah D as system testbeds. They are based at Denel Aviation's facilities at O.R. Tambo International Airport.

United States

- Draken International – During December 2017, it was announced that the company would buy and operate 12 ex-South African Air Force Cheetahs as an adversarial aircraft for training military pilots.

Former operators

Chile

- Chilean Air Force – In 2003, Chile purchased five of the mothballed SAAF's Cheetah Es as a source of spares for its similar ENAER Pantera. Chile retired its last Pantera (and closed its Grupo 4) from active service during 2007 following the retirement of their last Mirage Elkan in 2006.

Ecuador

- Ecuadorian Air Force – Grounded and definitely retired due to discontinuation and lack of spare parts.

South Africa

- South African Air Force – Entered service in 1986 and retired from active service in 2008.
  - 2 Squadron Cheetah C and D
  - 5 Squadron Cheetah E
  - 89 Combat Flying School Cheetah D
  - Test Flight and Development Centre Two Cheetah D

== Specifications (Cheetah C) ==
A drawing of the Atlas Cheetah

Data from Aerospaceweb.org — Aircraft Museum

General characteristics

- Length: 15.55 m (51 ft 0 in)
- Wingspan: 8.22 m (27 ft 0 in)
- Height: 4.5 m (14 ft 9 in)
- Wing area: 35 m^{2} (380 sq ft)
- Canard Area: 1.66 m^{2} (17.9 sq ft)
- Airfoil: 3.5%
- Empty weight: 6,600 kg (14,551 lb)
- Max takeoff weight: 13,700 kg (30,203 lb)
- Powerplant: 1 × Snecma Atar 9K50C-11 afterburning turbojet engine, 49.2 kN (11,100 lbf) thrust dry, 70.6 kN (15,900 lbf) with afterburner

Performance

- Maximum speed: 2,350 km/h (1,460 mph, 1,270 kn) / M2.2 at high altitude

1,390 km/h (860 mph; 750 kn) at sea level

- Range: 1,300 km (810 mi, 700 nmi)
- Ferry range: 2,600 km (1,600 mi, 1,400 nmi)
- Service ceiling: 17,000 m (56,000 ft)
- Rate of climb: 233.5 m/s (45,960 ft/min)
- Wing loading: 250 kg/m^{2} (51 lb/sq ft)

Armament

- Guns: 2 × 30 mm (1.18 in) DEFA 552 cannons with 125 rounds per gun
- Rockets: 4 × Matra rocket pods with 18 × SNEB 68 mm rockets each, OR 2 × Matra JL-100 drop tank/rocket pack, each with 19 × SNEB 68 mm rockets and 250 litres (66 US gal) of fuel
- Missiles: 2 × Python-3 AAMs, V4 R-Darter (BVR missile), V3S and/or Matra R530 missiles.
- Bombs: 8,800 lb (4,000 kg) of payload on five external hardpoints, including 250 kg Laser-guided bombs (LGB), GPS-guided bombs, 250 kg 'booster' bombs, a variety of unguided 'iron' bombs, reconnaissance pods or drop tanks

== See also ==
Related development

- Dassault Mirage III
- Dassault Mirage 5
- IAI Kfir
- IAI Nesher
- IAI Nammer

Aircraft of comparable role, configuration, and era

- Atlas Carver
- Dassault Mirage 2000
- Chengdu J-10
- General Dynamics F-16 Fighting Falcon
- Saab 37 Viggen

Related lists

- List of fighter aircraft
- List of aircraft of the South African Air Force
