= 109 Squadron =

109 Squadron or 109th Squadron may refer to:

- 109th Squadron (Iraq)
- 109 Squadron (Israel)
- 109 Squadron SAAF, South Africa
- No. 109 Squadron RAF, United Kingdom
- 109th Airlift Squadron, United States Air Force
- VPB-109, United States Navy
