= 140 Squadron =

140 Squadron may refer to:

- 140 Squadron (Israel)
- 140 Squadron, Republic of Singapore Air Force
- 140 Squadron SAAF, Air Force Mobile Deployment Wing SAAF, South Africa
- No. 140 Squadron RAF, United Kingdom
- 140th Aeromedical Transport Squadron, United States Air Force
- VAQ-140, United States Navy
