= 142 Squadron =

142 Squadron may refer to:

- 142 Squadron, Republic of Singapore Air Force
- 142 Squadron SAAF, Air Force Mobile Deployment Wing SAAF, South Africa
- No. 142 Squadron RAF, United Kingdom
- 142d Aero Squadron, Air Service, United States Army
- 142d Airlift Squadron, United States Air Force
- VAQ-142, United States Navy
- VF-142, United States Navy
- VP-142, United States Navy
- VMFA-142, United States Marine Corps
