= FALM =

FALM may refer to:

- Air Force Base Makhado
- Free Access to Law Movement
