= 2 Squadron SAAF =

South African Air Force unit

2 Squadron
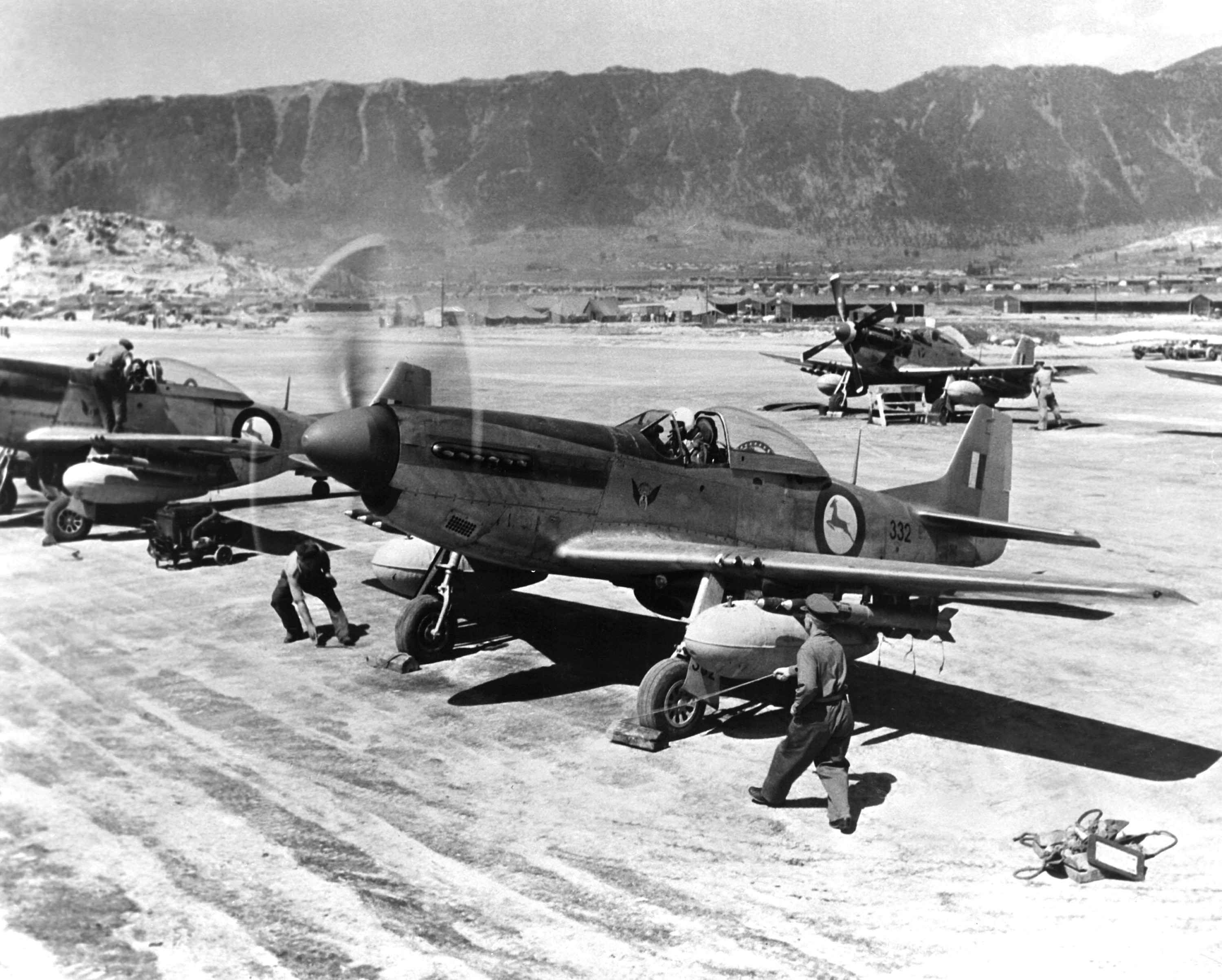
- 2 Squadron Mustang fighters during the Korean War
- Active: 1 October 1940–present
- Country: South Africa
- Branch: South African Air Force
- Role: Attack/Interception
- Garrison/HQ: AFB Makhado
- Nickname: Flying Cheetahs
- Mottos: Latin: Sursam Prorsusque ("Upward and Onward")
- Mascots: Historically, two cheetah cubs
- Equipment: JAS 39 Gripen
- Decorations: United States Presidential Unit Citation Republic of Korea Presidential Unit Citation
- Battle honours: East Africa 1941; The Juba & The Lakes; Western Desert 1941–1943; Sidi Rezegh; Agedabia; Gazala; El Alamein; French North Africa 1943; El Hamma & Tunis; Mediterranean 1943; South East Europe 1944–1945; Italy 1943–1945, The Sangro & Gothic Line; Korea 1950–1953, Pyongyang

Insignia
- Squadron Identification Code: DB (1939–1945)
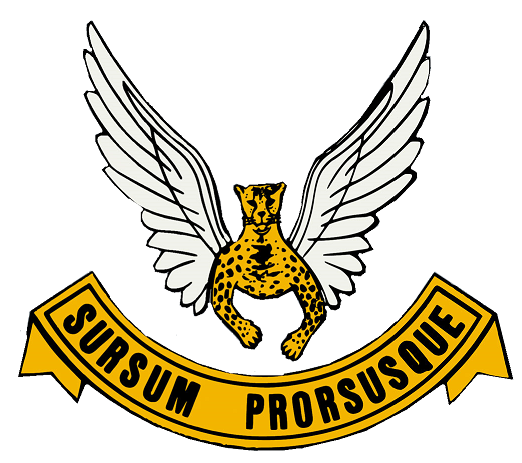
- 2 Squadron crest

2 Squadron is a squadron in the South African Air Force which was formed in 1940. The squadron has a long history, having been involved in every single combat action in which the SAAF has taken part. During the Second World War it made a name for itself in the battles for East Africa, before distinguishing itself in North Africa as part of the Desert Air Force, and later in Italy.

== World War II ==
The squadron was established on 1 October 1940, when the two flights of 1 Squadron SAAF that were operating in Kenya against the Italians in the East African campaign, were formed into a new squadron. The Kenya-based flights had operated independently from the remainder of 1 Squadron, based in the Sudan for several months, and two shootdowns of Italian aircraft made by the Kenya-based flights were retrospectively credited to the new squadron. Initial equipment of the new squadron was nine Hawker Furys fighters, nine Gloster Gladiators and five Hawker Hurricanes. In November, the Squadron's Gladiators were transferred to 1 Squadron SAAF, and on 3 January 1941, its Hurricanes were also passed to 1 Squadron SAAF, leaving 2 Squadron equipped with Furys, supplemented by three old Gloster Gauntlets inherited from 430 Flight RAF. In March 1941, the squadron was planned to re-equip with Curtiss Mohawk IV fighters, but when the new aircraft were delivered to Mombassa their engines proved to be faulty, and had to be sent to Britain for repair. On 17 April the squadron's pilots were sent off to Egypt where the squadron would be re-equipped for service in the Western Desert campaign. The squadron claimed eight Italian aircraft shot down during the East African campaign.

On arrival in Egypt, the squadron received Hurricanes as temporary equipment until it could convert to its planned equipment of Curtiss Tomahawks. A detachment of the squadron's Hurricanes operated over the front from Sidi Haneish Airfield from the end of May while the rest of the squadron continued to work up on Tomahawks. By July 1941, it had fully converted to and was operational on the Tomahawk.

During the initial years of the war, 2 Squadron served as part of 1 Bomber Brigade in the East African campaign and the North African campaign. After August 1943, it also saw action in Sicily, Italy and Yugoslavia.

During the Second World War the squadron operated the following aircraft:

- Hawker Hartebeest
- Hawker Fury I
- Gloster Gauntlet
- Gloster Gladiator II
- Hawker Hurricane
- Tomahawk IIB June 1941 – May 1942
- Kittyhawk I April 1942 – June 1943
- Kittyhawk III June 1943 – July 1943
- Supermarine Spitfire Vc July 1943 – March 1944
- Supermarine Spitfire IX February 1944 – July 1945

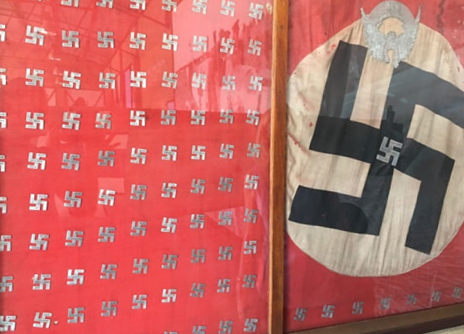
World War 2 era SAAF 2 Squadron killboard

== Korean War ==
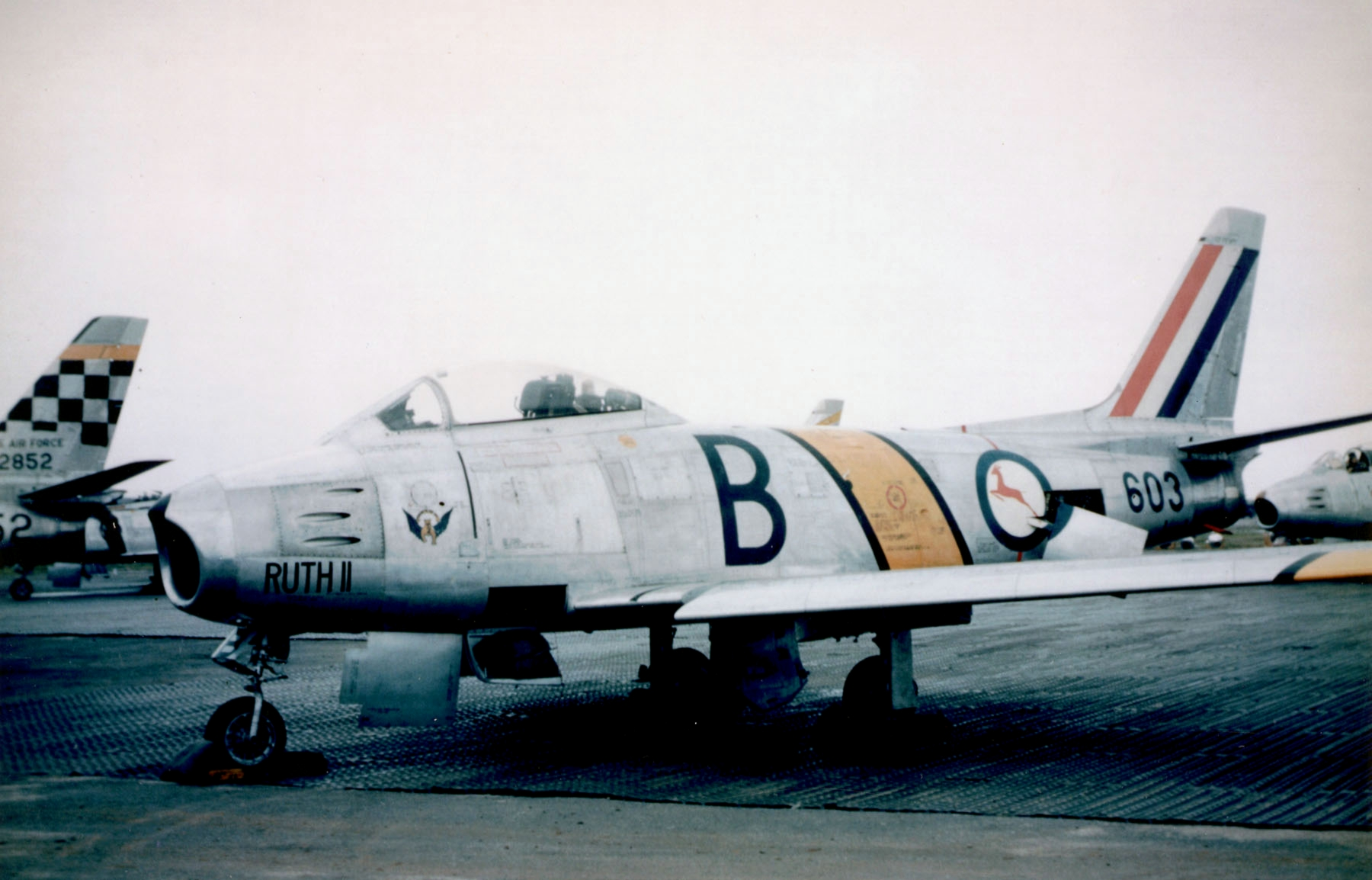
A No. 2 Squadron F-86F, 1953.

The squadron was South Africa's contribution to the United Nations war effort during the Korean War from November 1950 to December 1953. 2 Squadron was attached to the 18th Fighter-Bomber Wing U.S. Air Force for the duration of the war. Initially flying the P-51 Mustang, the squadron re-equipped with the F-86 Sabre in February 1953. During the war the squadron flew a total of 12,067 sorties, most being dangerous ground attack missions. 74 of the 94 Mustangs and 4 out of the 22 Sabres were lost, along with 33 pilots (14 killed in action, 11 missing in action, 8 killed in accidents).

- Republic of Korea Presidential Unit Citation (ROK)
- Presidential Unit Citation (USA)

For its actions, the squadron received the Republic of Korea Presidential Unit Citation, United States Presidential Unit Citation, and numerous other awards and decorations.

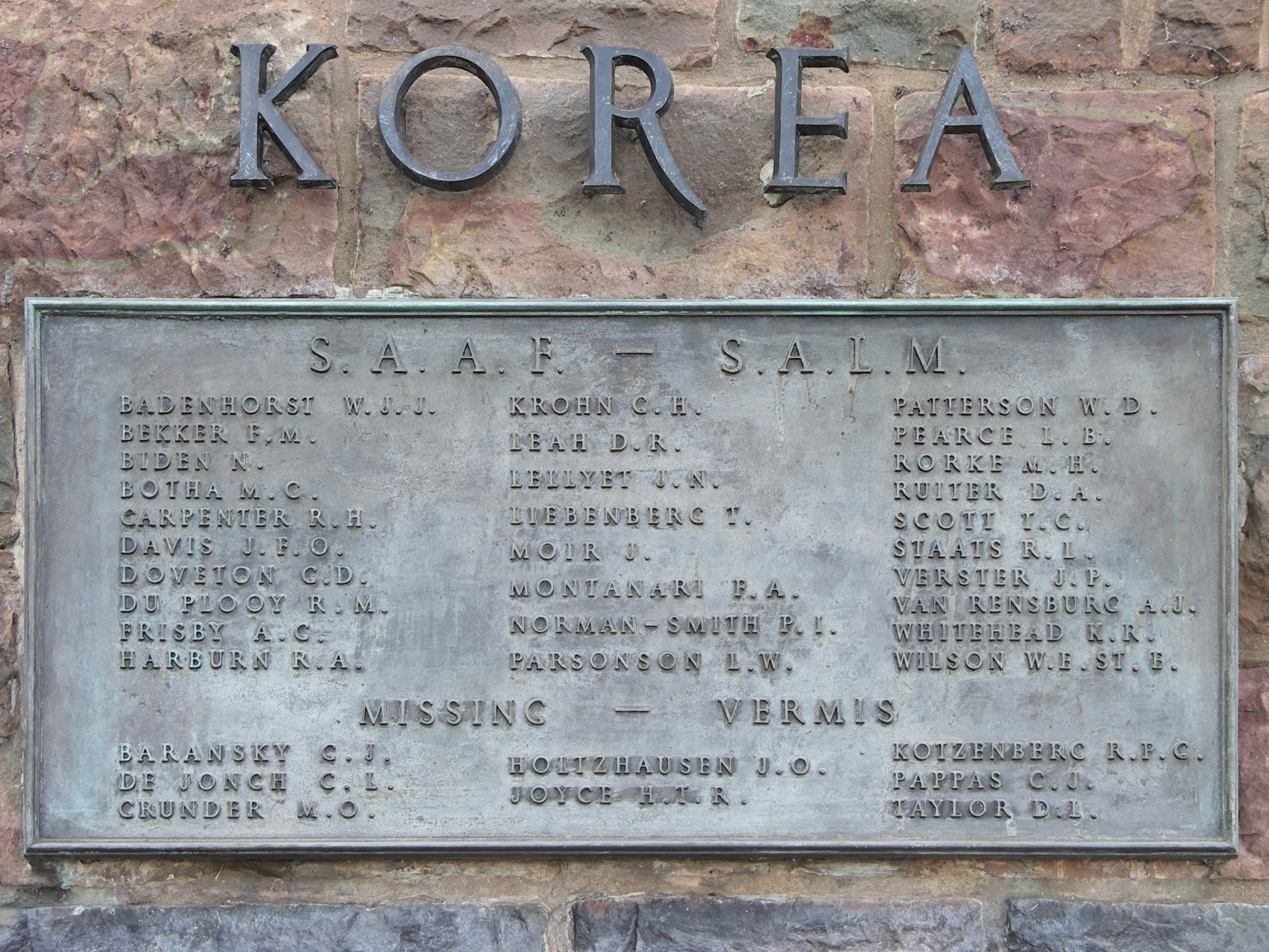
Memorial plaque, Union Buildings

The commanding officer of the 18th Fighter-Bomber Wing, issued a directive at the end of the war that:

In memory of our gallant South African comrades, it is hereby established, as a new policy that at all Retreat Ceremonies held by this Wing, the playing of our National Anthem shall be preceded by playing the introductory bars of the South African National Anthem, 'Die Stem van Suid-Afrika'. All personnel of this Wing will render the same honours to this Anthem as our own.

Eleven Korean War SAAF casualties are buried at the United Nations Memorial Cemetery, Busan, South Korea.

After the Korean War 2 Squadron, based at Waterkloof AFB, was equipped with Canadair CL-13 Sabres. For a period the squadron was stationed at AFB Pietersburg.

== The Border War and post 2000 ==
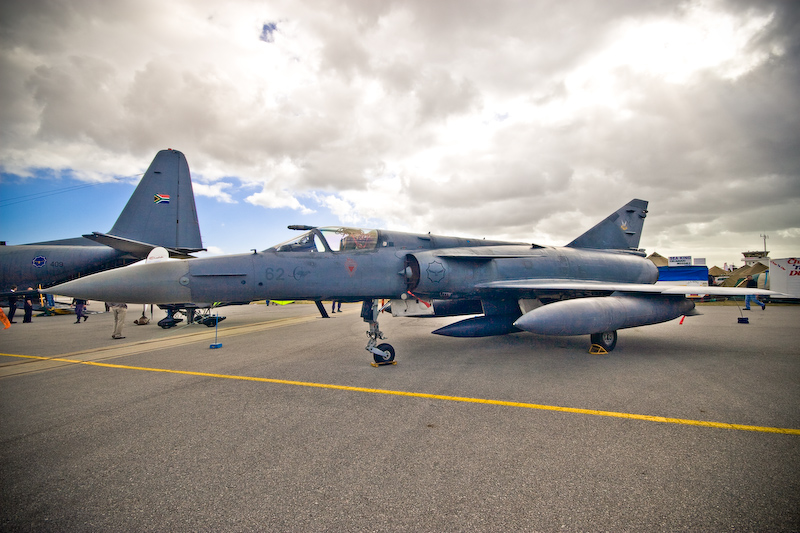
Cheetah C as flown by 2 Sqn

Conversion to the new Mirage III occurred in 1963 and the squadron moved to AFB Hoedspruit at the end of 1978. The squadron fought in several engagements during the South-West Africa/Angola Border War.

They continued to fly the Mirages until October 1990. They later re-equipped with the Atlas Cheetah C and D, but remained 'on the books' during the hiatus between Mirage and Cheetah, not being officially disbanded at that point. Reconnaissance was also performed using Vinten Vicon 18 Series 601 pod. Regular night flying was performed and the aircrew also performed air-to-air refuelling operations with the Boeing 707 aircraft of 60 Squadron, until these were retired in 2007. The squadron participated in the annual SANDF force preparation exercises which includes using live weapons. During joint exercises with the German Air Force in 2006, 40 live V3S "Snake" short-range air-to-air missiles were fired at the Denel Overberg Test Range.

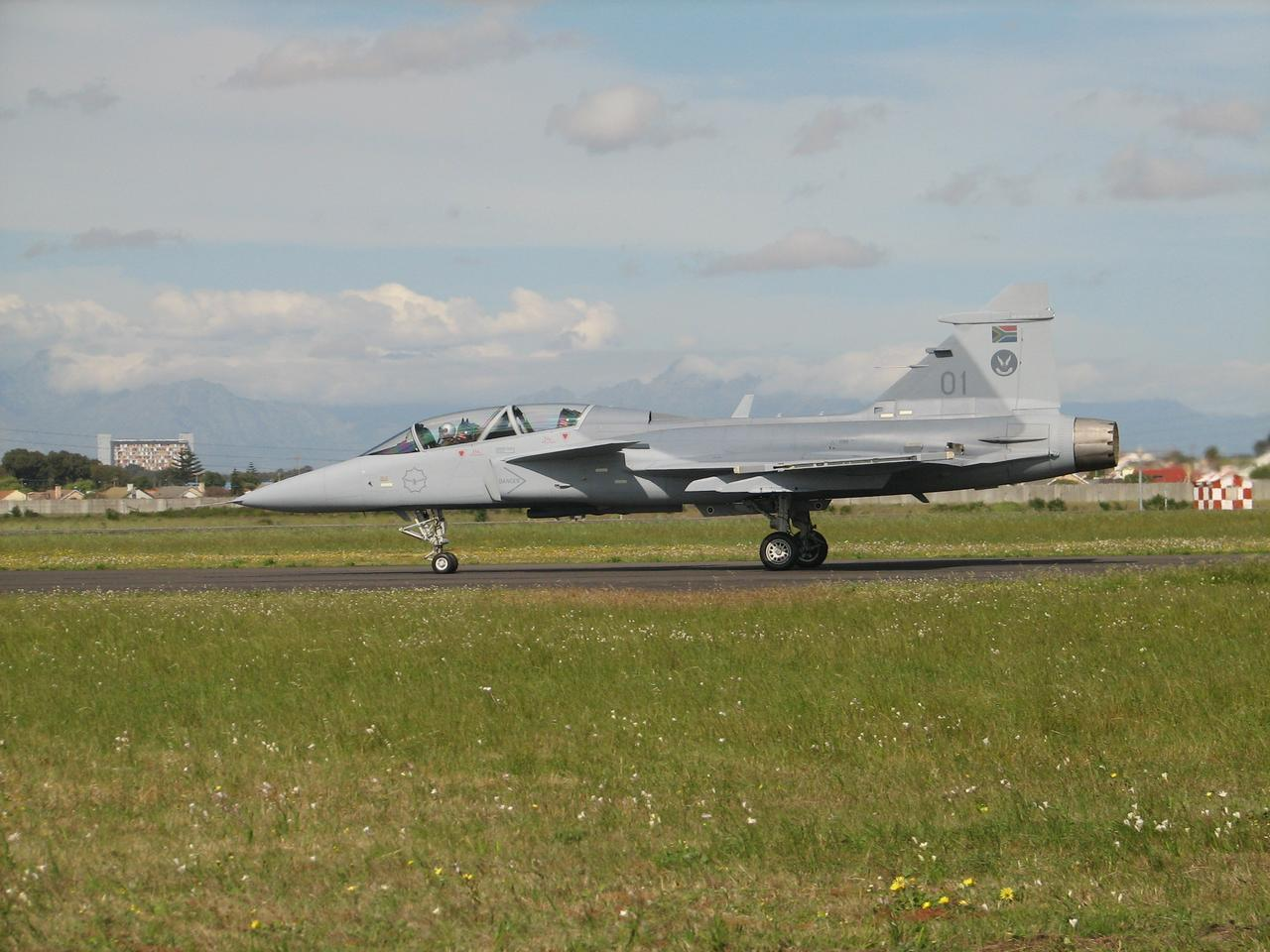
The squadron's current fighter, the JAS 39 Gripen.

Moving to Louis Trichardt (now AFB Makhado) in January 1993, 2 Squadron became the sole front line combat jet squadron in the SAAF. Till 2 April 2008 the squadron operated the Cheetah C/D fighter aircraft and was equipped with 28 examples. The squadron flew 1010 hours in 2004.

The last of the Cheetahs were retired on 2 April 2008, later that month the first new JAS 39 Gripen arrived. The SAAF accepted its first Gripen D in April 2008 and the final two Gripen D aircraft arrived in South Africa in July 2009. The first two Gripen Cs arrived on 11 February 2010 with deliveries ongoing as at October 2011. The squadron operates all the SAAF's Gripens except for the first Gripen D, which is assigned to the Test Flight and Development Centre at AFB Overberg.

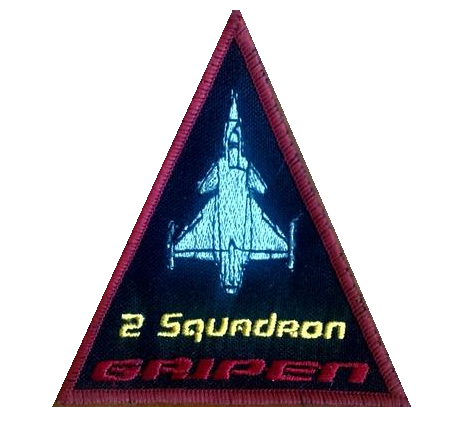
SAAF 2 Squadron Gripen flight patch

== Aircraft operated 1945–present ==
- North American F-51D Mustang July 1945 – 1953
- North American F-86F Sabre 1953
- de Havilland Vampire 1953–56
- Canadair Sabre Mk.6 1956–63
- Dassault Mirage III 1963–89
- Atlas Cheetah C and D 1988–2008
- JAS 39 Gripen 2008–present

== See also ==
- United Nations Forces in the Korean War
- Medical support in the Korean War

== Bibliography ==
- Halley, James J (1988). The Squadrons of the Royal Air Force & Commonwealth, 1918–1988. Tonbridge, Kent, UK: Air-Britain (Historians) Ltd. ISBN 0-85130-164-9.
- Shores, Christopher (1996). Dust Clouds in the Middle East: The Air War for East Africa, Iraq, Syria, Iran and Madagascar, 1940–42. London: Grub Street. ISBN 1-898697-37-X.
- Shores, Christopher; Massimello, Giovanni; Guest, Russell (2012). A History of the Mediterranean Air War 1940–1945: Volume One: North Africa: June 1940 – January 1942. London: Grub Street. ISBN 978-1-908117-07-6.
