= R-Darter =

Kentron V4 R-Darter
- Type: Air-to-air missile
- Place of origin: South Africa

Service history
- In service: 1995-2008
- Used by: South African Air Force; Pakistan Air Force

Production history
- Manufacturer: Denel Dynamics

Specifications
- Mass: 118 kg (236 lb)
- Length: 3.62 m (11.88 ft)
- Diameter: 0.16 m (6.3 in)
- Engine: Solid-fuel rocket
- Operational range: >80 km
- Guidance system: Active radar homing
- Launch platform: Combat aircraft or Attack helicopter: Atlas Cheetah C/D; Saab JAS 39 Gripen; JF-17 Thunder

The R-Darter is a beyond visual range (BVR) air-to-air missile guided by an active radar homing seeker. It was designed and manufactured by the South African firm Kentron, now known as Denel Dynamics.

The South African air-to-air missile program benefited from cooperation with Israel during the 1980s, the missile is very similar to the Python Derby.

== Service ==
The missile armed the South African Air Force's Cheetah C fighter aircraft and was withdrawn from service when those were retired in 2008. The SAAF has not yet publicly announced which BVR missile will be procured to equip the 26 Saab JAS 39 Gripens which have replaced the Cheetahs.

In 2006, the Brazilian Air Force was evaluating the R-Darter for use with their F-5 fighters since Denel will be selling the missiles used for the test at a low price, as they are nearing the end of their shelf-life. Instead, Brazil and South Africa started to develop the short range A-Darter together.

It was reported in 2010 that the R-Darter is being operated by the Pakistan Air Force.

== See also ==
- AIM-120 AMRAAM, a similar type of missile (beyond visual range)
- A-Darter, Denel's short range infrared homing missile.
