= 104 Squadron SAAF =

104 Squadron
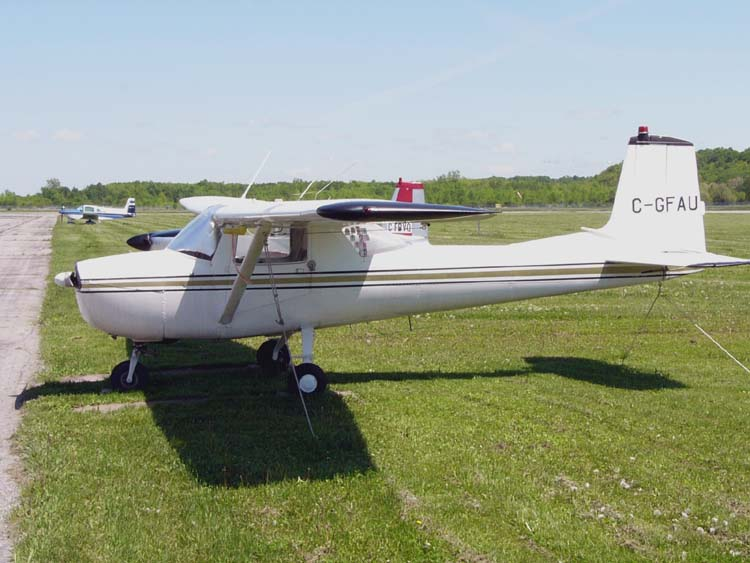
- The squadron uses privately owned civilian aircraft. Example of a Cessna 150 similar to that found among the wide range of aircraft used.
- Country: South Africa
- Branch: South African Air Force
- Role: Citizen Force liaison and crime prevention patrol squadron
- Garrison/HQ: AFB Waterkloof

104 Squadron is a reserve squadron of the South African Air Force. This squadron is used mostly in the VIP/IP transport role as well as reconnaissance flights in the Gauteng area. The squadron is based at AFB Waterkloof. These reserve squadrons are used to fill a pilot and aircraft gap within the SAAF by making use of civilian pilots and their privately owned aircraft. Most flying takes place over weekends and because pilots have a good knowledge of the local terrain in the area where they live and commonly fly, the squadron is also often used in a crime prevention role.
