= 102 Squadron SAAF =

102 Squadron
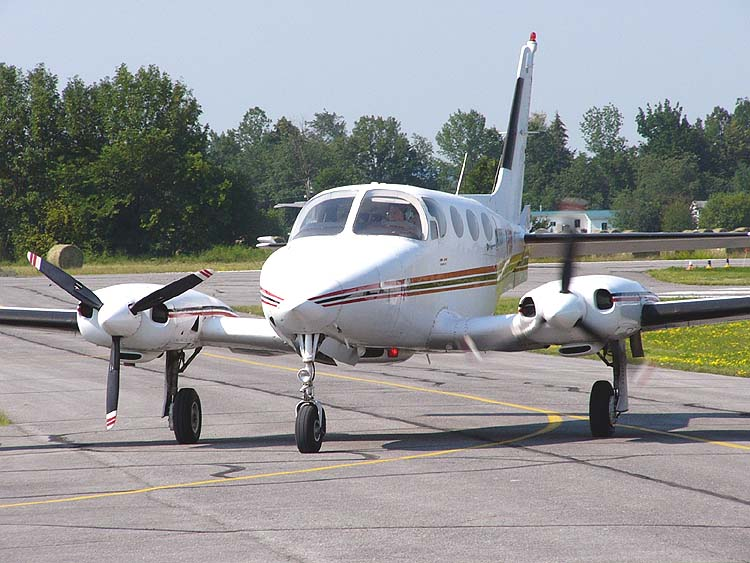
- The squadron uses privately owned civilian aircraft. A Cessna 340 similar to that found among the wide range of aircraft used.
- Country: South Africa
- Branch: South African Air Force
- Role: Citizen Force liaison and border patrol squadron
- Garrison/HQ: AFB Makhado

Insignia
- Squadron Crest

102 Squadron is a reserve squadron of the South African Air Force. The squadron area of responsibility is from north of Polokwane (Pietersburg) to the Limpopo River and is used for reconnaissance flights along the South African and Zimbabwe and Botswana borders. The squadron is based at AFB Makhado in Louis Trichardt. These reserve squadrons are used to fill a pilot and aircraft gap within the SAAF by making use of civilian pilots and their privately owned aircraft. Most flying takes place over weekends and because pilots have a good knowledge of the local terrain in the area where they live and commonly fly, the squadron is used mostly in the reconnaissance and crime prevention role.
