= 107 Squadron SAAF =

107 Squadron
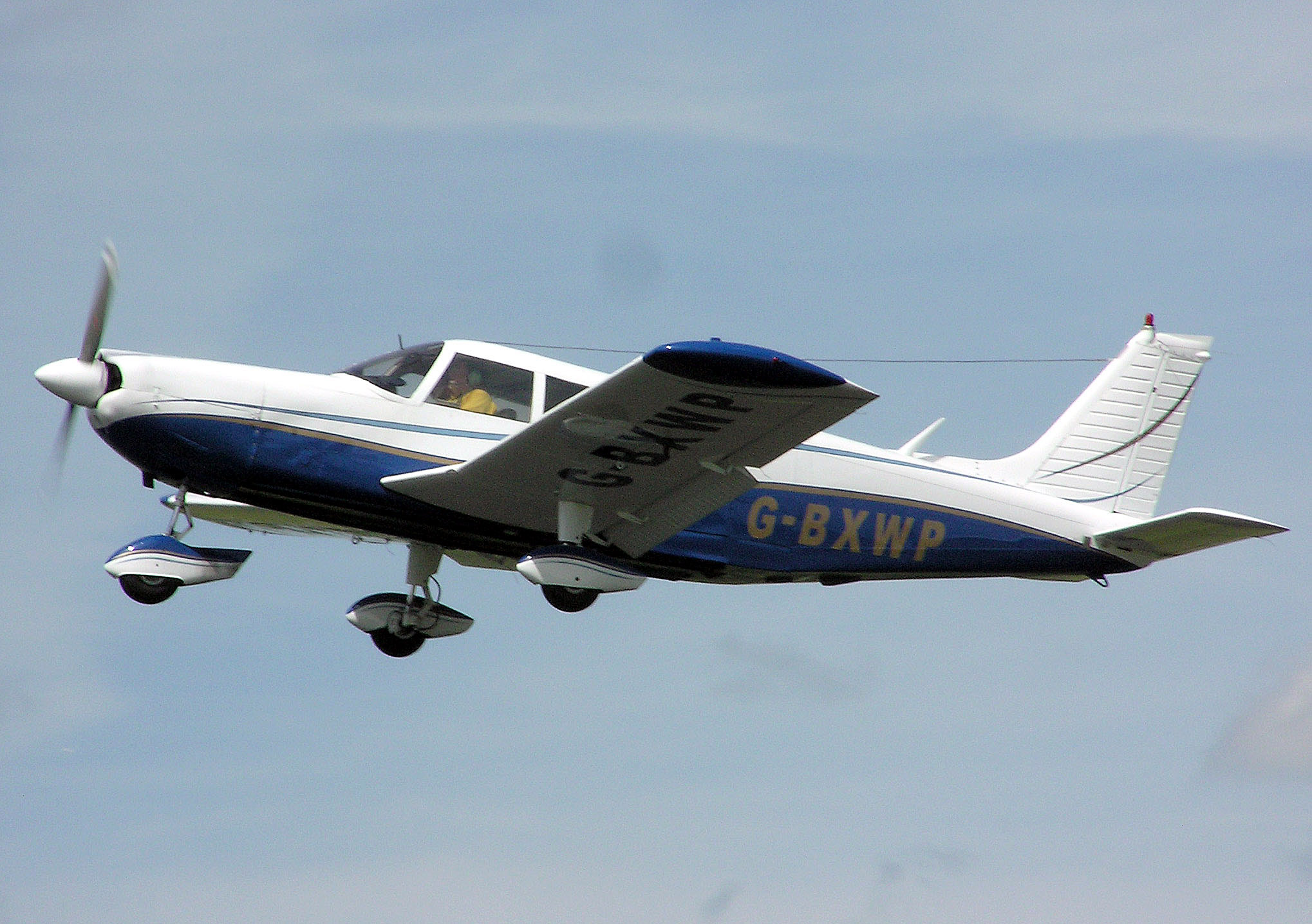
- A Piper Cherokee, typical of the privately owned aircraft used by the squadron
- Country: South Africa
- Branch: South African Air Force
- Role: Police operation assistance in the Northern Cape
- Garrison/HQ: AFB Bloemspruit

107 Squadron is a territorial reserve squadron of the South African Air Force. The squadron operations include coastal reconnaissance, command and control and radio relay in crime prevention operations in cooperation with the South African Police in the Northern Cape. The squadron is based in Kimberley, but is controlled by AFB Bloemspruit.
