= Denel Overberg Test Range =

Weapons systems testing facility on the south coast of South Africa

- Near Arniston in South Africa

Site information
- Type: Missile test range
- Operator: Denel
- Status: Active

Location
- Western Cape, South Africa
- Location within Western Cape
- Coordinates: 34°36′10″S 20°18′10″E
- Area: 430 km^{2} (170 sq mi)

Site history
- In use: 1980s–present

The Denel Overberg Test Range is a weapons systems testing facility in the Overberg region on the south coast of South Africa, near Arniston, Western Cape. It includes launch pads and tracking systems.

It was used to test the RSA series of Israeli-South African missiles until cancellation in 1992; since then it has been used by a variety of countries and clients.

Until 31 March 2011, it was known as simply the Overberg Test Range or OTB (Afrikaans abbreviation for Overberg Toetsbaan).

== Facilities ==
Facilities at the site include missile launch pads, tracking radar, optical missile tracking systems, cinetheodolites as well as the use of Overberg Air Force Base, home of the South African Air Force Test Flight and Development Centre. The layout appears to mirror the testing site at Palmachim, suggesting Israeli input in the design process.

Instrumentation includes:

- IRIG timecode telecommand transmission
- Precision instrumentation radars with velocity measurement and ability to track up to three objects simultaneously
- Fixed and mobile Doppler radar receivers to track missile velocities with 3 cm/s accuracy
- Mobile cine theodolites (5-300 frame/s) and a tracking pedestal with film (25–1000 frame/s) and video (50 Hz) capability
- Fixed and mobile telemetry stations for receiving real-time flight data
- 16mm, 35mm and 70mm high-speed cameras for photographic documentation of launches, flights and impacts
- Film and video processors for data reduction
- Multiple redundant receiving PCM on FM channels
- Real-time data manipulation and display capabilities
- Quick-look and post-test processing
- Atomic clock for accurate timing
- Multiple interfaces including IRIG-B, IRIG-A, a variety of slow codes, pulses as well as PC parallel and serial.
- Sophisticated command and control infrastructure, including a central control centre, a mobile control centre and a central computer.

== Clients ==
The site was notably used for test launches of the RSA series of missiles, including the joint Israeli-South African RSA-3 Intermediate-range ballistic missile in 1989 and 1990. Development of this military programme was cancelled 1992 however, testing for the South African civil space programme continued at the site for another year before also being cancelled in 1993.

Since then the facility has served a number of foreign clients, including:

- Germany for testing Exocet, Sea Sparrow, Taurus and IRIS-T missiles
- Czech Republic
- Singapore for testing Igla missiles
- The UK for evaluation of the Denel Rooivalk helicopter
- Sweden for testing the RBS15 MK3 and CAMPS
- Spain for integration of the Taurus missile on the F-18.
- Turkey; the Turkish Navy held a live fire exercise in May 2014 during which two frigates and a corvette fired various missiles and guns.

== Testing ==
Testing at the site focuses predominantly on flight performance rather than the destructive capability of weapon systems. Consequently missile test flights are typically conducted with dummy warheads or instrument packs rather than live weapons.

The following types of tests can be performed:

- Air-to-air tests
- Air-to-surface (land or sea) tests
- Surface-to-surface (land or sea) tests
- Anti-tank tests, including from helicopters
- Aircraft performance, carriage and release clearance and avionics evaluation

while the following types of data are provided to clients:

- Trajectories
- Telemetry recording
- Photographic documentation
- Meteorological profiles

== See also ==
- AFB Overberg, South African Air Force base
- Test Flight and Development Centre SAAF
- South Africa and weapons of mass destruction
- Israel–South Africa Agreement
- Vela incident
