= 111 Squadron SAAF =

111 Squadron
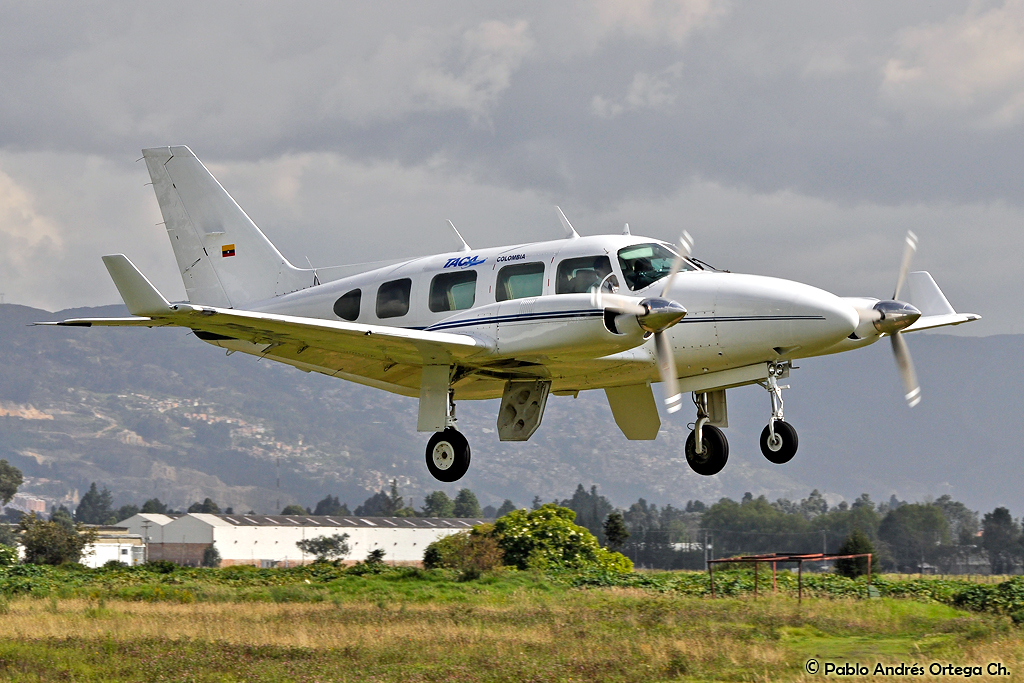
- Piper Navajo, typical of the type of privately owned aircraft used by the squadron
- Country: South Africa
- Branch: South African Air Force
- Role: VIP transportation and reconnaissance
- Garrison/HQ: AFB Waterkloof

111 Squadron is a Reserve squadron of the South African Air Force. The squadron is primarily involved in VIP transport and reconnaissance flights in the Gauteng area. The squadron is headquartered at AFB Waterkloof.
