= Air Force Station Port Elizabeth =

- IATA: PLZ; ICAO: FAPE

Summary
- Operator: South African Air Force
- Location: Port Elizabeth, Eastern Cape Province, South Africa
- Elevation AMSL: 226 ft (69 m)
- Coordinates: 33°58′52″S 25°37′21″E
- Website: www.af.mil.za

Map
- Location in the Eastern Cape Province

Runways
Direction	Length		Surface
Direction	m	ft	Surface
08/26	1,980	6,496	Asphalt
17/35	1,677	5,501	Asphalt
10/28	1,160	3,805	Grass

Air Force Station Port Elizabeth is a South African Air Force facility situated on the north-eastern side of the Chief Dawid Stuurman International Airport main runway. It was downgraded from an Air Force Base in the early 1990s.

It is home to C Flight of 15 Squadron which currently operates four BK 117 helicopters. Their primary role is maritime and landward search and rescue. Conversion to AgustaWestland AW109 helicopters has been postponed due to delays in developing emergency flotation equipment for the type, thus precluding its use in a maritime environment.

== Units hosted ==
- C Flight of 15 Squadron
- 108 Squadron — Territorial Reserve Squadron operating various civil light aircraft in the utility transport role.

== See also ==
- Port Elizabeth branch of the SAAF Museum - another SAAF facility located at the airport
