= 109 Squadron SAAF =

109 Squadron
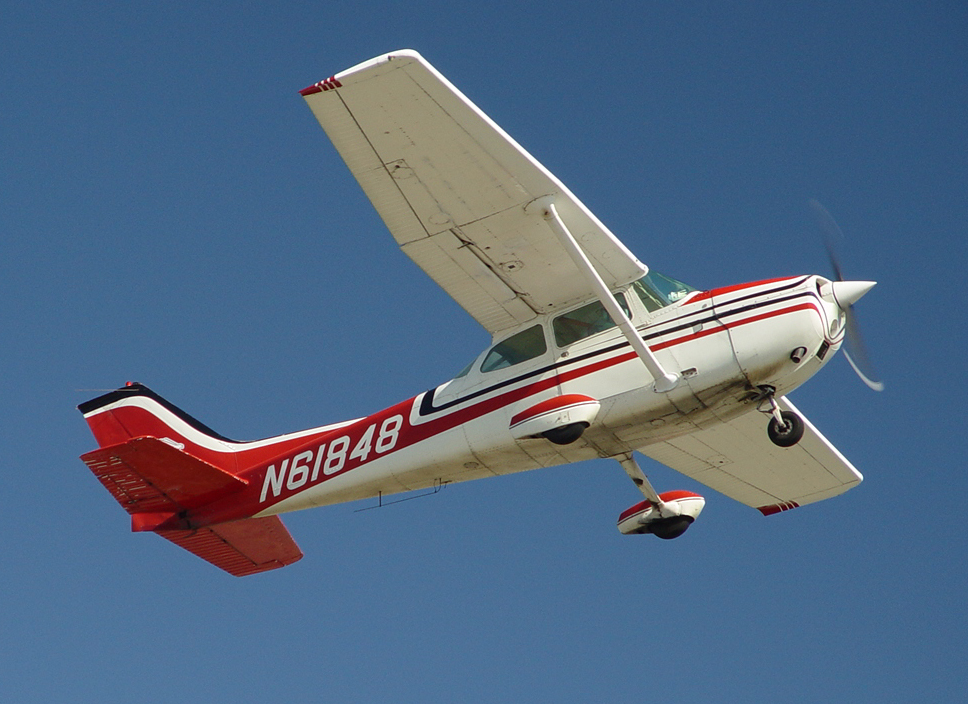
- Cessna 172, typical of the type of civilian aircraft flown by 109 Sqn
- Active: 24 September 1963 – 1 October 1968 (Air Commando); 1 October 1968 – 31 March 1993 (Squadron)
- Country: South Africa
- Branch: South African Air Force
- Role: Light Aircraft Utility Sqn
- Motto(s): Quarimus (Quaerimus) "Seek"

Insignia
- Squadron Insignia

109 Squadron SAAF was initially established as 109 Air Commando. It was a Citizen Force squadron of the South African Air Force, established on 24 September 1963 at Mossel Bay. The unit was staffed by volunteer aircrew flying privately owned civilian aircraft. On 1 October 1968 control of 109 Air Commando was passed from the South African Army to the Air Force and the name was changed to 109 Squadron. The squadron stopped flying on 31 January 1993 and was disbanded on 31 March 1993. Its pilots were transferred to 105 and 108 Commando Squadrons.
