= 108 Squadron SAAF =

108 Squadron
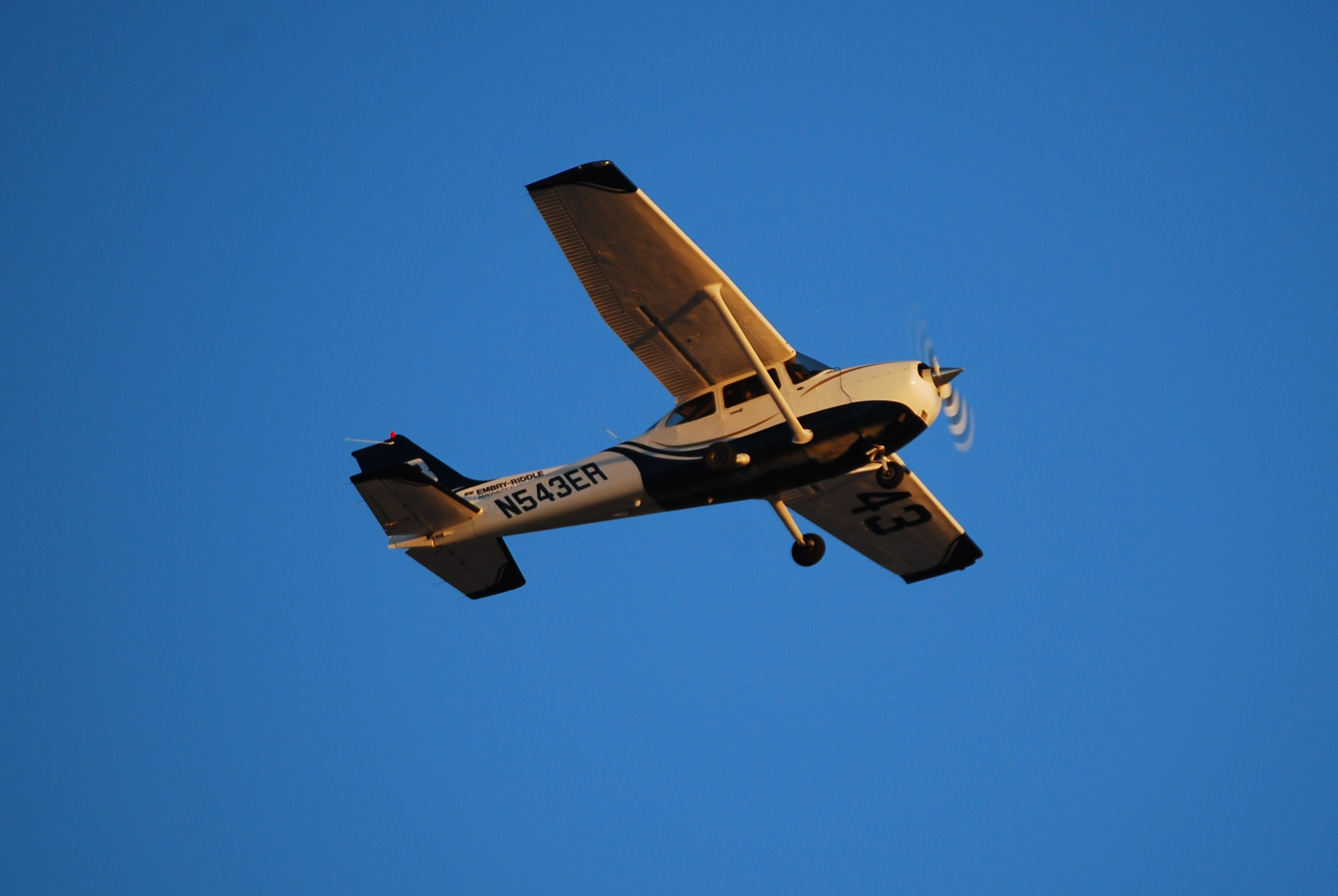
- Cessna 17, typical of the privately owned aircraft types used by the squadron
- Country: South Africa
- Branch: South African Air Force
- Role: Reserve military force in crime prevention and coastal operations
- Garrison/HQ: AFS Port Elizabeth

108 Squadron is a territorial reserve squadron of the South African Air Force. The primary squadron operations include coastal reconnaissance flights, as well as command, control, and telstar communications in crime prevention operations alongside the South African Police and the South African Army. The squadron is based in Port Elizabeth.

Main operations include coastal reconnaissance flights, command and control and telstar in crime prevention operations in co-operation with the police and Army.
