= 85 Combat Flying School SAAF =

85 Combat Flying School
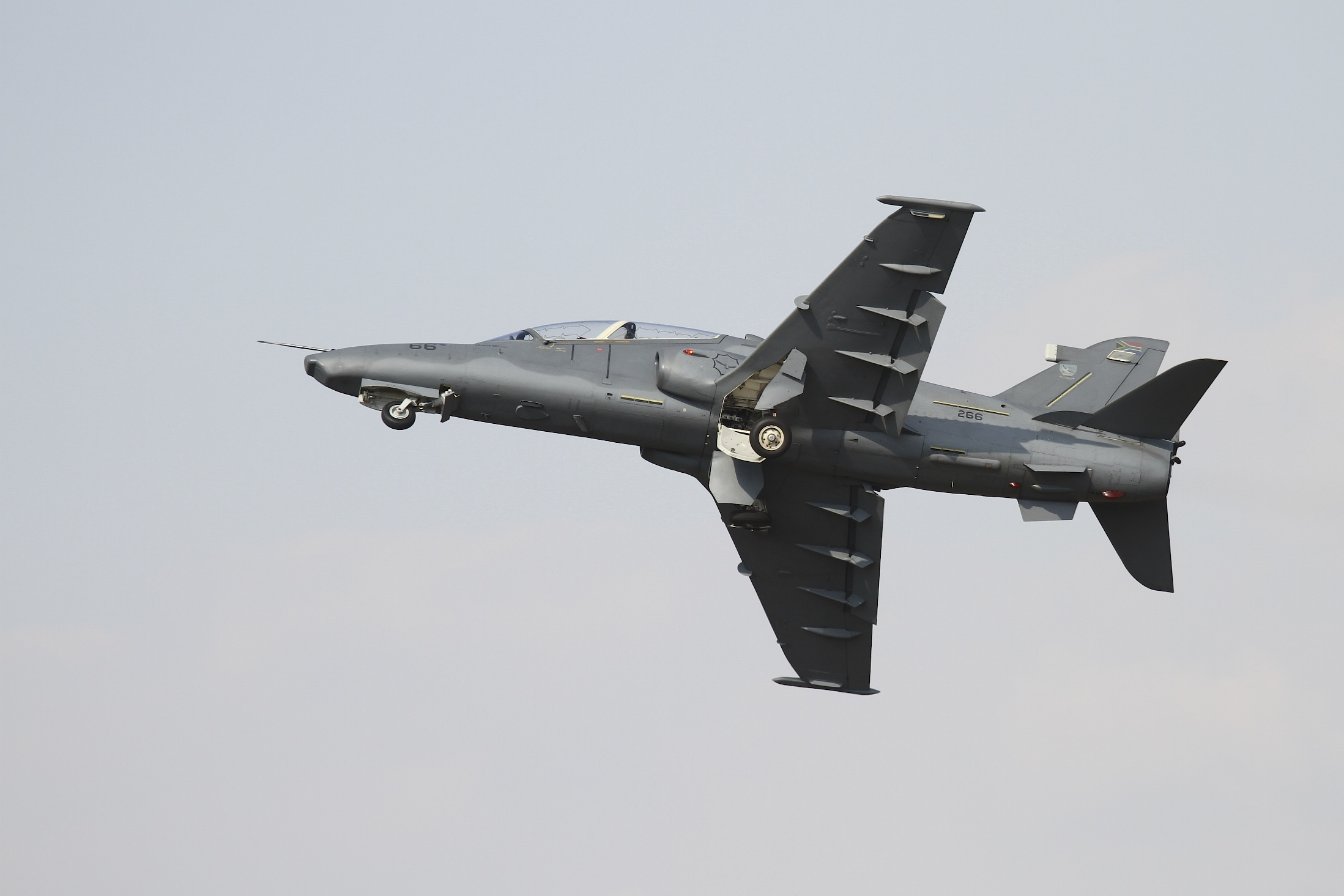
- SAAF Bae Hawk Mk. 120
- Active: 1982 - Present
- Country: South Africa
- Branch: South African Air Force
- Type: Jet flight-training and combat operations school
- Current Base: AFB Makhado, Louis Trichardt
- Motto: Detrimento Sumus (Destruction is our Business)
- Anniversaries: Received Unit colours 4 October 1988, Received national colours 1989
- Aircraft used currently: BAE Hawk Mk.120
- Engagements: SWA/Angolan conflict.

85 Combat Flying School is a unit of the South African Air Force (SAAF). It is a jet flight-training and combat operations school, it was first formed in 1982 at AFB Pietersburg (It was known as Advanced Flying School from 1967). It relocated to AFB Hoedspruit on 1 January 1993 due to the closure of AFB Pietersburg. The school also has a wartime reserve role, although it has publicly been stated that the school will not be used operationally unless a very urgent need arises.

Aircraft used previously :

- Mirage IIIEZ/DZ/D2Z
- Canadair Sabre Mk.6 1975 - 1980
- Atlas Impala Mk.I/II 1972 - 2005

The school has been relocated to AFB Makhado from AFB Hoedspruit into a new purpose-built facility with state-of-the-art computer-aided flight training instruments. The school shares this facility with the SAAF Gripen community.

During October 2007 there were several pilots that went solo on the Hawk Mk.120.

The squadron also participated in the annual South Africa National Defence Force preparation exercises and fired live cannon rounds and dropped live bombs. They also had a successful weapons deployment exercise to AFB Bloemspruit in 2007.
