= Air Force Base Overberg =

Airbase of the South African Air Force

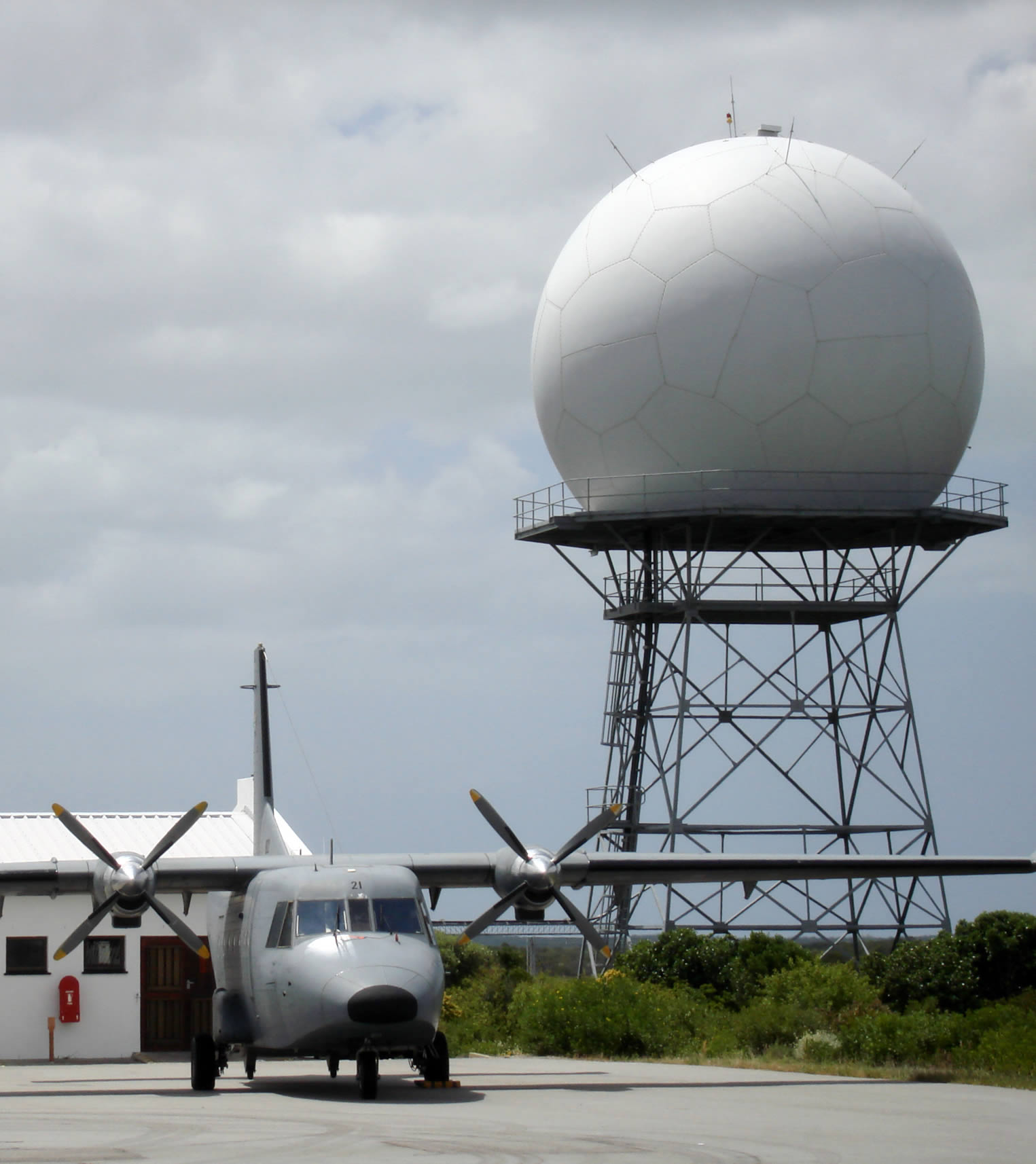
- Doppler radar tower at Air Force Base Overberg
- IATA: OVG; ICAO: FAOB

Summary
- Airport type: Military
- Operator: South African Air Force
- Location: Bredasdorp, Cape Agulhas Local Municipality, Western Cape, South Africa
- Elevation AMSL: 52 ft (16 m)
- Coordinates: 34°33′17″S 20°15′02″E
- Website: www.af.mil.za

Map
- Location in the Western Cape

Runways
Direction	Length		Surface
Direction	ft	m	Surface
10/28	6,926	2,111	Asphalt
17/35	10,220	3,115	Asphalt

Air Force Base Overberg (IATA: OVG, ICAO: FAOB) is an airbase of the South African Air Force at Bredasdorp on the Overberg district of the Western Cape province and is the host of the 525 squadron and the Test Flight and Development Centre. It is placed under command of the Air Office in Pretoria, Gauteng.

The Denel Overberg Test Range uses the Overberg Air Force Base.
