= Test Flight and Development Centre SAAF =

Unit of the South African Air Force

Coordinates: 34°33.27′S 20°15.04′E

Test Flight and Development Centre
- Founded: 10 August 1975
- Country: South Africa
- Role: Aircraft test flying and development
- Home Base: AFB Overberg
- Motto: Alerte (Alert)
- Aircraft Operated: Various (current types include BAe Hawk Mk.120 and Gripen D)

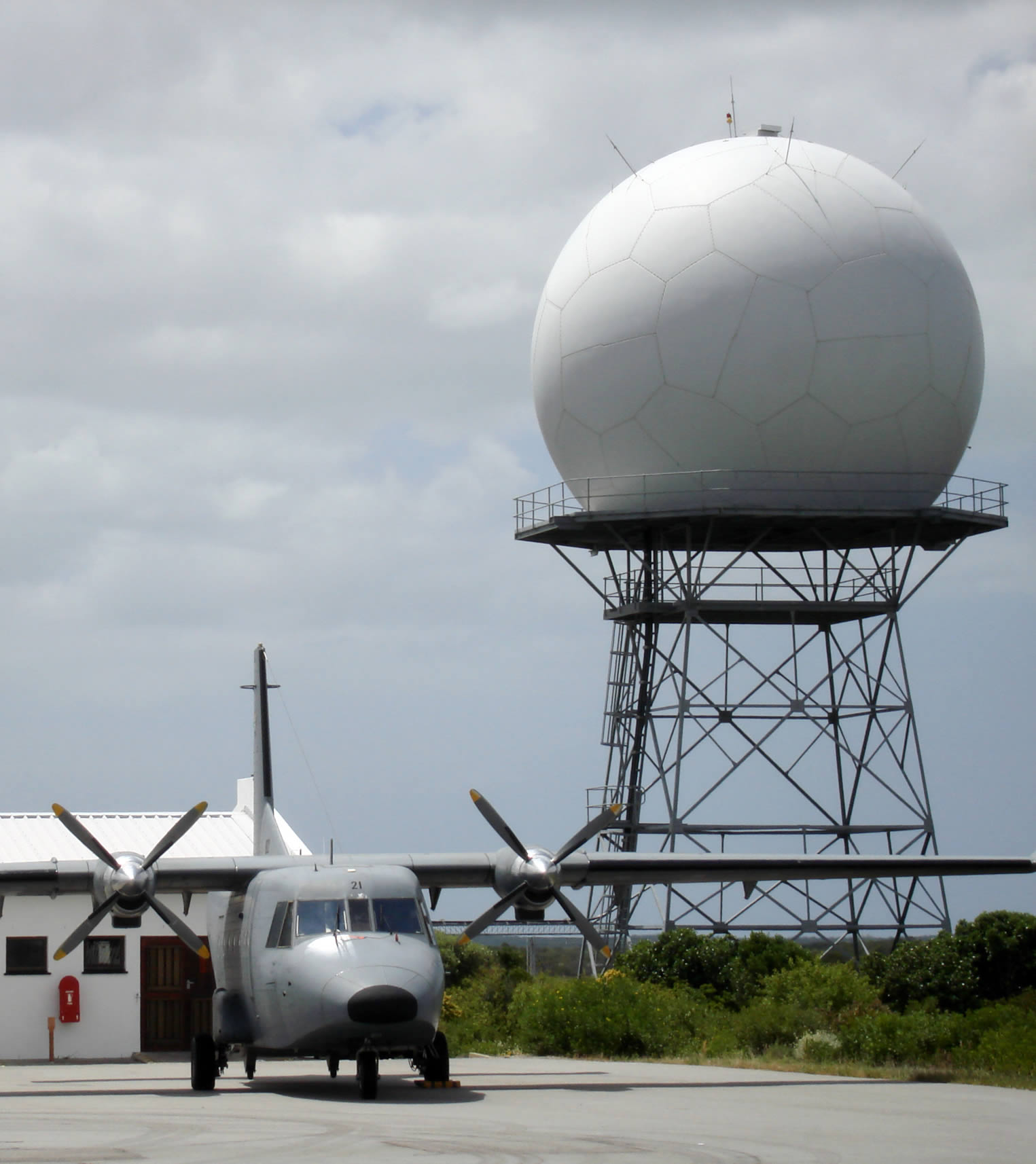

The Test Flight and Development Centre is a unit of the South African Air Force. It is a test flight and evaluation organisation.

Due to South Africa's apartheid policies of the 1960s, a number of countries instituted an arms boycott against it. This forced the SAAF to create an indigenous flight testing and development capability to research new technologies and methods and update old ones, and in this light a former graduate of the Empire Test Pilots' School (ETPS) was appointed the SAAF's Chief Test Pilot in 1967 and tasked with improving and expanding the air force's test flying and evaluation capabilities. In 1974 another ETPS graduate took over, and was tasked with creating a specialised test flying and evaluation unit within the SAAF. The result was that the Test Flight and Development Centre was officially established on 10 August 1975 at AFB Waterkloof.

Over the next few years until the imposition of the mandatory United Nations arms embargo against South Africa in 1977, additional pilots were sent to the ETPS and to EPNER in France to gain flight test experience and expertise. By 1979, the TFDC had grown large enough to merit the allocation of one of the hangar complexes at AFB Waterkloof, and in 1980 it established a satellite unit at Van Ryneveld Airfield in Upington to conduct weapons release tests. Once the Denel Overberg Test Range near Bredasdorp on the southern Cape coast had been completed, the TFDC moved to an adjacent airfield, now known as AFB Overberg.

== Aircraft Fleet ==
As of July 2011 TFDC's permanent fleet consists of:

- 1x Agusta 109 LUH - #4006
- 1x SAAB Gripen D - #3901
- 1x BAe Hawk - #250
- 1x Atlas Oryx - #1200

Other aircraft are operated on temporary detachment from squadrons as well as manufacturers such as Denel.

== Projects ==
=== Hawk trainer ===
The TFDC's largest running project was the operational evaluation of the BAe Hawk Mk.120 and certification of its Adour 951 turbofan engine.
Weapons integration was also performed, with the SAAF's series of pre-fragmented bombs. The programme is now largely complete, with one Hawk airframe remaining on strength with TFDC, for further tests. Hawk has entered SAAF service as of 2006.

=== Taurus missile ===
In 2001 and 2002 it assisted the German Air Force in the testing of the Taurus stand-off missile, for which two Panavia Tornado aircraft deployed a number of times to AFB Overberg from Germany with the help of a SAAF Boeing 707 aerial tanker. In 2009 the Spanish Air Force performed integration tests of the Taurus missile on their F-18 Hornet fighters at TFDC.

=== Gripen ===
The TFDC received the SAAF's first JAS 39 Gripen in 2006. The aircraft is flown through an extensive test programme, integrating weapons and SAAF specific avionics etc. During November 2007, the Gripen was shown publicly taking off loaded with eight 'dumb' bombs during weapons integration trials.

=== Luftwaffe Kormoran Anti Ship missile firings ===
During 2006 the German Air Force deployed six Panavia Tornado aircraft to TFDC for live Kormoran anti ship missile firings with a German Navy task group in joint exercises with South African forces.
