= Air Force Mobile Deployment Wing SAAF =

The Air Force Mobile Deployment Wing (AFMDW) is a radar and communications wing of the South African Air Force. It provides combat ready, integrated and deployable air support capabilities. It appears to have sprung from the remnants of Airspace Control Command SAAF, which up until the late 1980s provided radar and warning functions. From the early 1950s, 1, 2, and 3 Satellite Radar Stations were formed at Mariepskop, Ellisras, and Mafiking, along with 70 Mobile Radar Group.

The AFMDW consists of 18 Deployment Support Unit, Mobile Communications Unit, 140 Squadron and 142 Squadron, 500 Squadron and 501 Squadron.

The 18 Deployment Support Unit provides logistical support to deployment elements in the South African Air Force. They can erect a temporary air base (TAB), and ensure that all logistic functions are maintained for the duration of the deployment. They also assist the South African Police Service (SAPS) and the South African Army in the prevention of crime and border patrol operations. They can also provide a mass freight service to all service branches of the South African National Defence Force.

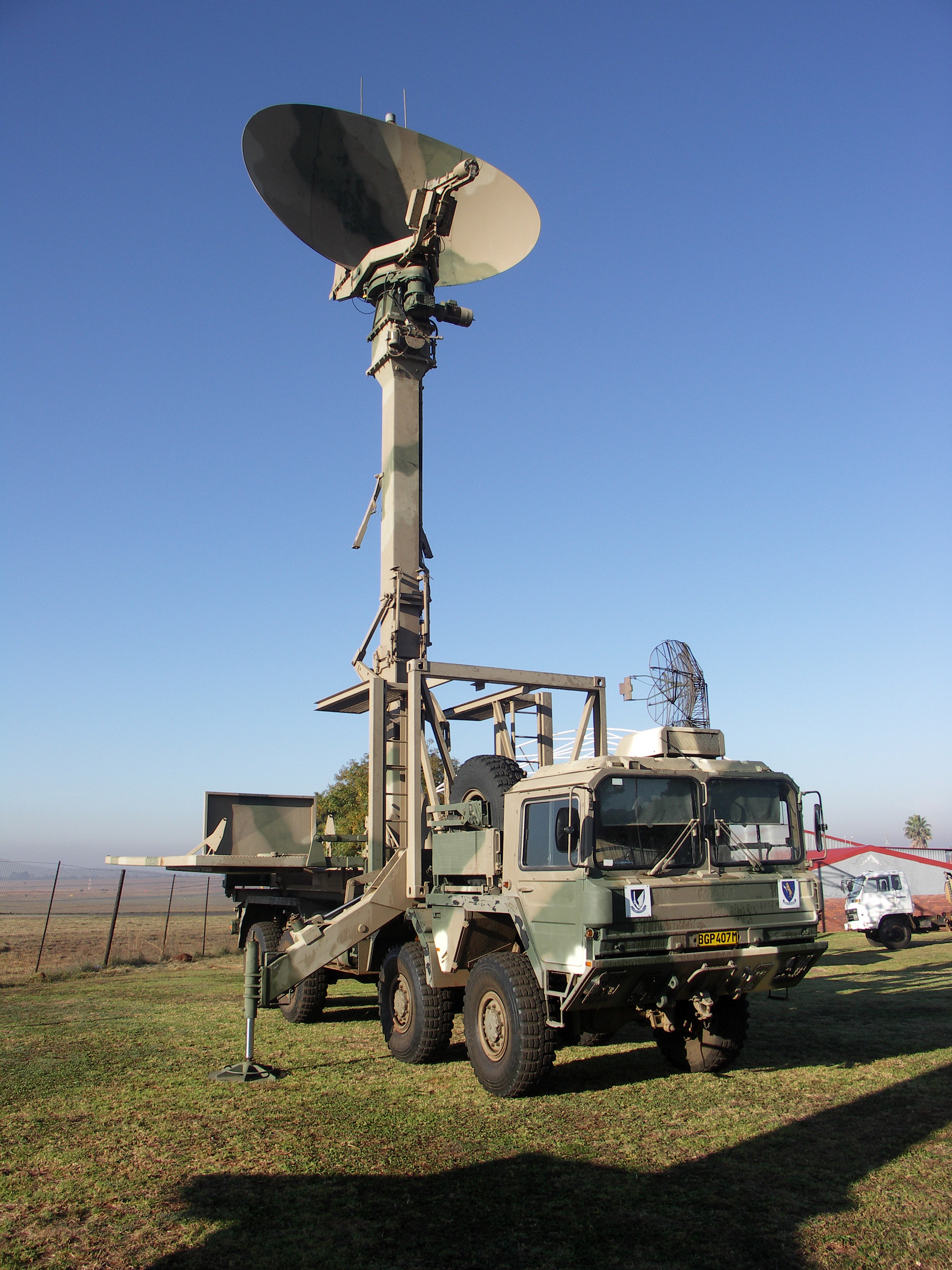
South African Air Force Plessey TMR (Tactical Mobile Radar) based on the Marconi S711 radar. Used by 142 Squadron SAAF.

The Mobile Communications Unit SAAF (MCU) provides field communication services, single-and multiple-channel command and control communications to the South African Air Force, operating equipment such as satellite phones, two-way radios and digital microwave transmission links. Their vehicle inventory consists mainly of CCV 4x4's, SAMIL50’s and Land Rovers. The SAMIL trucks are used to carry different types of equipment, the Land Rovers, the point-to point-communication equipment and the CCV 4x4's for Command and Control.

Command and control communications are used mainly for Tactical Air Base deployment, Tactical Mobile Radar and other radar deployments, Tactical Air Force Command Post (T/AFCP) deployment, Tactical Forward Air Command Post (T/FACP) deployment, Mobile Sector Control Centre deployment, Helicopter Administration Area (HAA), Mobile Ground Signal Intelligence System (MGSS), Remote Piloted Vehicle (RPV), South African Air Force College, Command and Control School, Air Defence Artillery (ADA) and Electronic Warfare (EW) force preparation and flying squadron training and Joint Operations communications with military (e.g. United Nations peacekeeping missions) and external parties (e.g. SAPS). The unit also provides the air force with in flight and ground command and control communications during humanitarian aid operations, for Conventional-, jumping- and air transportable Mobile Air Operation Teams and Crime prevention operations in support of the SAPS. The MCU used to be part of the SAAF Telecommunications Centre (SAAFTC) at Air Force Base Waterkloof, but because of the ever-growing demand for mobile communications in the SAAF, MCU was founded as a unit in 1990. In 1999 it became a unit of the Mobile Deployment Wing.

140 Squadron SAAF provides deployable Mobile Sector Control Center, Mobile Ground to Air Radio's as well as mobile Air Traffic Control towers to the South African Air Force.

142 Squadron SAAF is a mobile unit equipped with the Plessey Tactical Mobile Radar (TMR) station, based on the Marconi S711. TMR has a 100NM (180 km) range. The radar system is transported by MAN 8X8 Trucks

(500 Squadron) provides a rapid reaction task force, a VIP Protection capability and other specialised security services to the South African Air Force. (501 Squadron) provides asset and personnel protection to the air force.

The area occupied by the AFMDW was previously known as Air Force Station Snake Valley and is situated opposite Air Force Base Swartkop on the eastern side of the shared runway.
