= Air Force Base Makhado =

AFB Makhado
- IATA: none; ICAO: FALM

Summary
- Airport type: Military
- Operator: South African Air Force
- Location: Louis Trichardt, Limpopo, South Africa
- Elevation AMSL: 3,069 ft (935 m)
- Coordinates: 23°09′36″S 029°41′48″E
- Website: www.af.mil.za

Map
- Location in Limpopo

Runways
Direction	Length		Surface
Direction	m	ft	Surface
10/28	4,020	13,189	Asphalt
10L/28R	500	1,640	Asphalt

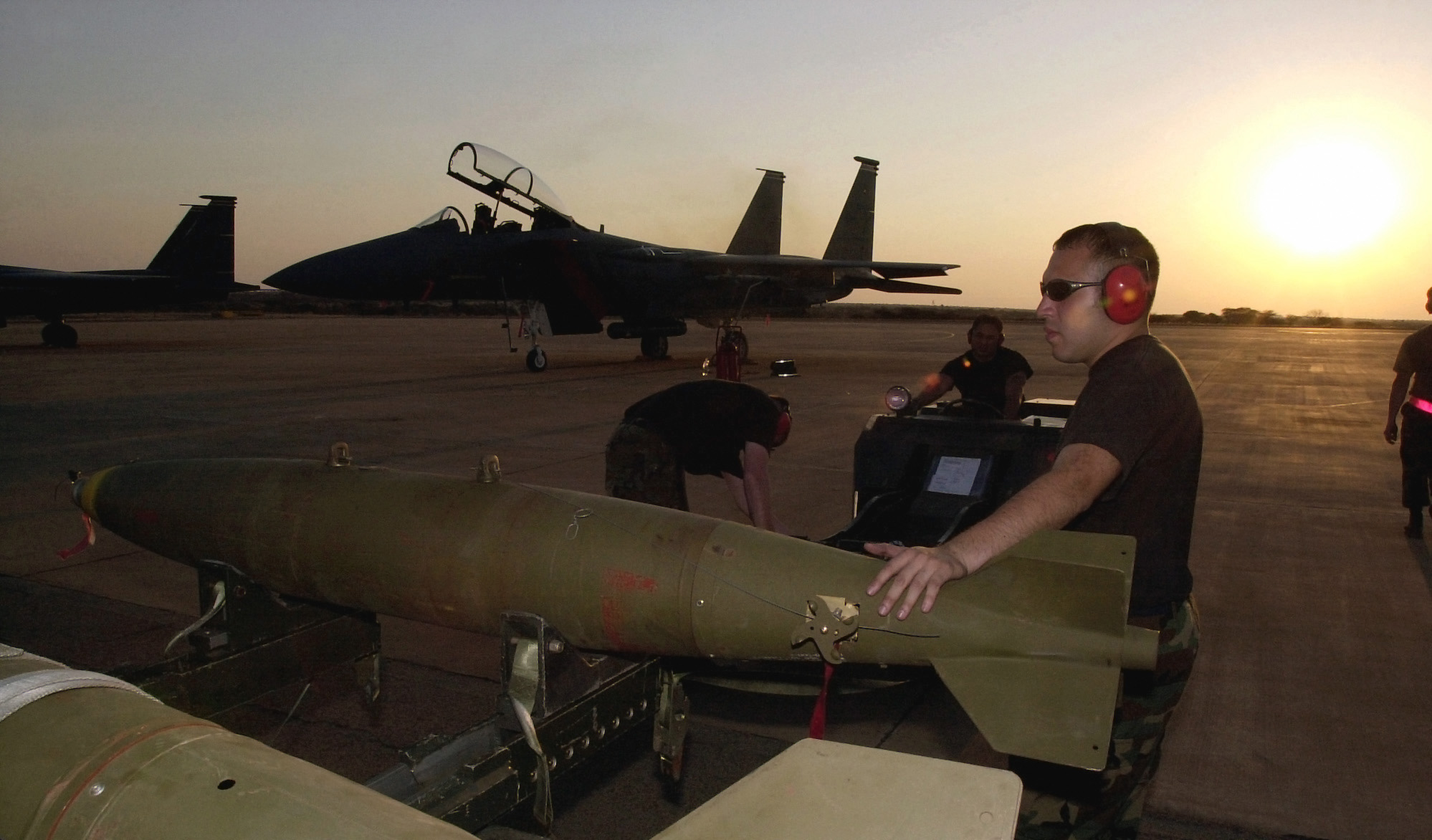

Air Force Base Makhado (ICAO: FALM), formerly Air Force Base Louis Trichardt, is an airbase of the South African Air Force. It is the SAAF's northernmost base, situated at Louis Trichardt near the border with Zimbabwe, as well as being its most modern, and is known unofficially as Fighter Town, RSA.

The base motto is Castrum Borealis (Fortress of the North).

== Units hosted ==
- 2 Squadron – Fighter squadron
- 85 Combat Flying School
- 102 Squadron – Light transport (reserve)
- 515 Squadron – Security services
- 3 Air Servicing Unit – Maintenance support

== History ==
The base was officially opened on 14 October 1987 as AFB Louis Trichardt, but changed its name to match that of the nearby town on 7 November 2003. The town has since reverted to its old name, but the base name remains unchanged. The base uses cheetahs to control wildlife.

== See also ==
- List of longest runways
