= List of aircraft of the South African Air Force =

Ensign of the South African Air Force

The South African Air Force (SAAF) has operated a wide variety of aircraft since its establishment in 1920. Its fleet has included fighter, transport, maritime patrol, helicopter, training, and reconnaissance aircraft, reflecting the service's changing operational requirements over more than a century.

Historically, the SAAF maintained one of the largest and most capable air forces in the Southern Hemisphere. During the latter stages of the Cold War and into the post-apartheid era, its combat fleet was centred on the Atlas Cheetah, a South African-developed modernisation of the Mirage III, and the Dassault Mirage F1. Following the end of the South African Border War and subsequent reductions in defence spending, large numbers of aircraft were retired, placed into storage, or withdrawn from service.

The following is a list of current and historic aircraft of the South African Air Force.

== Current aircraft ==
Aircraft	Origin	Class	Role	Introduced	In service	Total (acquired)	Unit operating
Combat Aircraft
Saab JAS-39 Gripen	Sweden	Jet	Multi-role	2008	25	26	2 Squadron (SAAF Air Force Base Makhado)
BAE Systems Hawk Mk.120	United Kingdom / South Africa	Jet	Lead-in fighter trainer	2006	22	24	85 Combat Flying School (SAAF Air Force Base Makhado)
Trainer Aircraft
Pilatus PC-7	Switzerland	Propeller	Trainer	1994	35	60	Central Flying School (SAAF Air Force Base Langebaanweg)
Reconnaissance / Maritime patrol
Cessna 208 Caravan	United States	Propeller	ISTAR	1988	8	12	41 Squadron (SAAF Air Force Base Waterkloof)
Douglas C-47-TP Turbo Dakota	United States	Propeller	Naval patrol	1943	5	39	35 Squadron (SAAF Air Force Base Ysterplaat)
Transport
Lockheed C-130 Hercules	United States	Propeller	Transport	1963	6	12	28 Squadron (SAAF Air Force Base Waterkloof)
CASA C-212 Aviocar	Spain	Propeller	Transport	1994	3	4	44 Squadron (SAAF Air Force Base Waterkloof)
Pilatus PC-12	Switzerland	Propeller	Transport	1997	1	1	41 Squadron (SAAF Air Force Base Waterkloof)
Beechcraft Super King Air	United States	Propeller	Transport	1981	2	4	41 Squadron (SAAF Air Force Base Waterkloof)
Boeing 737 (BBJ)	United States	Jet	VIP	2001	1	1	21 Squadron (SAAF Air Force Base Waterkloof)
Cessna Citation II	United States	Jet	VIP	1983	2	2	21 Squadron (SAAF Air Force Base Waterkloof)
Dassault Falcon 50	France	Jet	VIP	1982	2	2	21 Squadron (SAAF Air Force Base Waterkloof)
Dassault Falcon 900	France	Jet	VIP	1992	1	1	21 Squadron (SAAF Air Force Base Waterkloof)
Helicopter
Denel Rooivalk	South Africa	Rotorcraft	Attack	2011	11	12	16 Squadron (SAAF Air Force Base Bloemspruit)
Atlas Oryx	South Africa	Rotorcraft	Transport	1990	37	51	15 Squadron (SAAF Air Force Base Durban) 17 Squadron (SAAF Air Force Base Swartkop) 19 Squadron (SAAF Air Force Base Hoedspruit) 22 Squadron (SAAF Air Force Base Ysterplaat) 87 Helicopter Flying School (SAAF Air Force Base Bloemspruit)
AgustaWestland AW109	Italy	Rotorcraft	Utility / SAR	2003	24	30	15 Squadron (SAAF Air Force Base Durban) 17 Squadron (SAAF Air Force Base Swartkop) 19 Squadron (SAAF Air Force Base Hoedspruit) 87 Helicopter Flying School (SAAF Air Force Base Bloemspruit)
MBB/Kawasaki BK 117	Germany	Rotorcraft	Utility	1994	8	10+	15 Squadron (SAAF Air Force Base Durban) 87 Helicopter Flying School (SAAF Air Force Base Bloemspruit)
Westland Super Lynx 300 Mk.64	United Kingdom	Rotorcraft	ASW	2007	4	4	22 Squadron (SAAF Air Force Base Ysterplaat)
Unmanned combat aerial vehicle
Milkor 380	South Africa	UAV	ISR / Attack	—	On order	(+5)	Currently undergoing testing as a long-planned replacement for the Seeker UAV, which was operated by 10 Squadron prior to the squadron's disbandment in 1991.

== Historic aircraft no longer in service ==
Aircraft	Origin	Role	Service period	No. operated	Notes
Aermacchi AM.3C Bosbok	Italy/S. Africa	Utility	1973–1992	40	
Aeronca KCA	US	Liaison	?	?	
Aeronca 50C Chief	US	Liaison	1940-?	1	
Aeronca 65C Super Chief	US	Liaison	?	?	
Aérospatiale SA365N Dauphin	France	Helicopter	1994–1998	1	
Aermacchi/Atlas MB.326 Impala	Italy/S. Africa	Trainer	1966–2005	251	
Aermacchi/Atlas C.4M Kudu	Italy/S. Africa	Utility	1976–1991	40	
Airco DH.4	UK	Bomber	1919–1927	10	
de Havilland DH.9	UK	Bomber	1919–1942	11	Airco DH.9 until 1920. Some had Bristol Jupiter engines as DH M′pala
Airspeed AS-6J Envoy	UK	Transport	1936–1940	7	
Airspeed AS-10 Oxford Mk.I & II	UK	Trainer	1940-1950	700	
Atlas Cheetah C, D, E	South Africa	Fighter	1986–2008	68	
Auster AOP-3, 5, 6 & 9	UK	Liaison	1945-1967		
Avro 504K & N	UK	Trainer	1919–?	31+	
Avro Avian	UK	Trainer	?-1936	21+	
Avro Tutor	UK	Trainer	1930–1938	59	
Avro Anson	UK	Trainer	1940–1947	750+	
Avro York C.1	UK	Transport	1944–1952	1	
Avro Shackleton MR.3	UK	Maritime Patrol	1957–1984	8	
Beechcraft C-45 Expeditor	US	Transport	1945	2	
Beechcraft B-80 Queen Air	US	Transport	1975–1992	2	
Boeing 707	US	Transport	1986–2007	5	
Bristol Blenheim Mk.I, IV & V	UK	Bomber	1939–1943	10+	
Bristol Beaufort I, IA, II, IIA	UK	Bomber	1941–1944	58	
Bristol Beaufighter Mk.II, VI, X	UK	Attack	1943–1944	7+	
British Aircraft Double Eagle	UK	Liaison	1939–1940	1	
Britten-Norman Islander	UK	Transport	1994-?	2	
Bücker Bü 131A/B/D Jungmann	Germany	Trainer	1936–1939	?	
Bücker Bü 133 Jungmeister	Germany	Trainer	1939-?	?	
Canadair Sabre Mk.6	Canada	Fighter	1956–1980	34	
CASA CN-235	Spain	Transport	1994-2012	1	
Cessna C-34 Airmaster	US	Liaison	?	1	
Cessna 185A, D & E Skywagon	US	Liaison	?	45	
Cessna 320	US	Transport	1965–1967	1	
Cessna Skymaster	US	Transport	?	?	
Cessna 411	US	Transport	?	?	
Consolidated Catalina Mk.IB/III	US	Maritime Patrol	1943–1946	18	
Consolidated Liberator B.Mk.VI	US	Maritime Patrol	1944–1945	16	
Curtiss Mohawk	US	Fighter	1941–1942	159	
Curtiss Tomahawk, Kittyhawk & Warhawk	US	Fighter	1940–1948	210+	
Dassault Falcon 20	France	Transport	1966	1	
Dassault Mirage III	France	Fighter	1963–1990	57	
Dassault Mirage F1AZ & CZ	France	Fighter	1975–1997	51	
de Havilland DH.60 Moth/Gypsy Moth/Moth Major	UK	Trainer	1939-?	28	
de Havilland DH.66 Hercules	UK	Transport	1934–1943	3	
de Havilland DH.80A Puss Moth	UK	Liaison	1939-?	1	
de Havilland DH.82A Tiger Moth	UK	Trainer	1939–1958	675	
de Havilland DH.83 Fox Moth	UK	Transport	1939-?	?	
de Havilland DH.84 Dragon	UK	Transport	1939-?	1	
de Havilland DH.85 Leopard Moth	UK	Liaison	1939–1943	7	
de Havilland DH.87B Hornet Moth	UK	Liaison	1939–1940	19	
de Havilland DH.89 Dragon Rapide/Dominie	UK	Transport	1939-?	21	
de Havilland DH.90 Dragonfly	UK	Transport	1939-?	3	
de Havilland DH-94 Moth Minor	UK	Trainer	1939-?	?	
de Havilland DH-98 Mosquito	UK	Bomber	1943–1945	22+	
de Havilland DH.100 Vampire FB.5, FB.6	UK	Fighter	1950–1978	56	
de Havilland DH.115 Vampire T.11, T.55	UK	Trainer	1953–1978	27	
de Havilland DH.104 Dove 5	UK	Transport	1949–1965	9	
de Havilland DH.114 Heron 2	UK	Transport	1955–1962	2	
Desoutter Mk.II	UK	Liaison	?	1	
Dornier Do 27B	Germany	Liaison	1958–1975	2	
Douglas Boston Mk.III	US	Bomber	1941–1943	18	
Douglas Dakota	US	Transport	1943–?	149	
Douglas DC-4-1009, C-54 Skymaster	US	Transport	1966–1994	8	
English Electric Canberra B(1)12	UK	Bomber	1963–1991	6	
English Electric Canberra T.4	UK	Trainer	1964–1991	3	
Fairey Battle B, T, TT	UK	Trainer	1939–1942	340	
Fairchild F-24G, R Argus III	US	Liaison	1939-?	1	
Fieseler Fi 156C-7 Storch	Germany	Liaison	1946-?	1	
General Aircraft ST-4 II Monospar	UK	Transport	?	1	
General Aircraft ST-25 Universal	UK	Transport	?	1	
Gloster Gauntlet	UK	Fighter	1939–1943	6	
Gloster Gladiator Mk I & II	UK	Fighter	1939–1941	31	
Gloster Survey	UK	Transport	1933–1942	1	
Gloster Meteor F.3	UK	Fighter	1946–1949	1	
Hawker Hartbees Mk.I	UK	Bomber	1935–1940	69	
Hawker Hart	UK	Bomber	1936–1944	320	
Hawker Audax	UK	Fighter	1937–1944	80	
Hawker Fury Mk.I & Mk.II	UK	Fighter	1936–1942	53	
Hawker Hurricane Mk.I & II	UK	Fighter	1939–1945	193	
Hawker-Siddeley HS-125	UK	Transport	1970–1999	8	
Hawker Siddeley Buccaneer S.Mk.50	UK	Bomber	1965–1991	16	
Farman HF.27	France	Trainer	1915-?		
Junkers A-50 Junior	Germany	Trainer	?	?	
Junkers F.13	Germany	Transport	?-1944	1	
Junkers Ju 52-3m	Germany	Transport	1939–1953	23	
Junkers Ju 86	Germany	Transport	1939–1945	18	
Klemm Kl 25	Germany	Trainer	?	?	
Koolhoven F.K.46	Netherlands	Trainer	?	?	
Lockheed Super Electra	US	Transport	?	3	
Lockheed Lodestar	US	Transport	1940–1944	31	
Lockheed Hudson	US	Bomber	1940-?	1	
Lockheed Ventura GR.V	US	Maritime Patrol	1942–1960	395	
Lockheed C-130F Hercules	US	Transport	1997–1998	7	
Martin Maryland Mk.I & II	US	Bomber	1940-1942	148+	
Martin Baltimore	US	Bomber	1941-1945	26+	
Martin Marauder I, II & III	US	Bomber	1942-1945	56+	
Miles M.2H Hawk	UK	Trainer	1943-?	2	
Miles Sparrowhawk	UK	Trainer	1939–1941	1	
Miles Magister	UK	Trainer	1940-?	7	
Miles Master T.II	UK	Trainer	1941–1945	426	
Miles Falcon	UK	Trainer	?	1	
Nord C160Z Transall	France	Transport	1969–1993	9	
North American Harvard/Texan	US	Trainer	1942–1995	744	
North American Mustang IIIB, IV, IVA	US	Fighter	1945, 1951-1952	95+	
Northrop Nomad Mk.I	US	Trainer	1941–1944	57	
Percival Gull VI	UK	Trainer	1940-?	1	
Piaggio P166 Albatross	Italy	Transport	1969–1993	27	
Pilatus PC-6 Porter	Switzerland	Transport	1994–1998	1	from Bophuthatswana Air Force
Pilatus PC-7 Turbo Trainer	Switzerland	Trainer	1994–1996	3	from Bophuthatswana Air Force, returned to Pilatus
Piper J-3	US	Trainer	?	?	
Piper J-4 Cub Coupe	US	Trainer	?	1	
Piper PA-23 Aztec 250	US	Liaison	1981–1992	2	
Piper PA-28 Cherokee 140	US	Liaison	1981–1992	1	
Rearwin Speedster	US	Liaison	1939-?	?	
Rearwin Sportster	US	Liaison	1939-?	12+	
Royal Aircraft Factory BE.2c & e	UK	Reconnaissance	1915–1921		
Royal Aircraft Factory S.E.5A	UK	Fighter	1919–1931	24	
Ryan ST-A	US	Trainer	1939-?	3	
Short Sunderland GR.V	UK	Maritime Patrol	1945–1957	16	
Sikorsky S-51	US	Helicopter	1948–1968	3	
Sikorsky Whirlwind	US	Helicopter	1956–1968		
Simmonds Spartan	UK	Trainer	1925	1	
Stinson HW-75	US	Liaison	?	?	
Stinson SR-5A & 10C Reliant	US	Liaison	?	2	
Sud Aviation Alouette II & III	France	Helicopter	1960–2006	126	
Sud Aviation SA-321L Super Frelon	France	Transport Helicopter	1967–1990	17	
Sud Aviation Puma SA330C, H, J, L	France	Transport Helicopter	1969–1997	109	
Supermarine Spitfire V, VIII, IX	UK	Fighter	1942–1954	205	
Supermarine Spitfire PR IXe	UK	Reconnaissance	1947–1954	?	
Swearingen Merlin IVA	US	Transport	1975–1985	7	
Taylorcraft BC/BL/BL-65	US	Liaison	1939-?	?	
Tipsy S.2 Trainer	Belgium	Trainer	1939-?	1	
Vickers Type 264 Valentia	UK	Transport	1940–1943	11	
Vickers Wellesley	UK	Bomber	1940–1941	?	
Vickers Wellington	UK	Bomber	?-?	24	
Vickers Warwick Mk.V	UK	Bomber	1945–1946	32	
Vickers 781D Viscount	UK	Transport	1958–1991	1	
WACO biplanes	US	Liaison	?	?	
Westland Wapiti	UK	Bomber	1931–1943	31	
Westland Wasp HAS 1	UK	Helicopter	1963–1990		
