= Central Flying School (disambiguation) =

The Central Flying School is the Royal Air Force's primary institution for the training of military flying instructors.

Central Flying School may also refer to:

- Central Flying School RAAF, a Royal Australian Air Force training establishment
- Central Flying School RNZAF, a Royal New Zealand Air Force unit
- Central Flying School SAAF, a flight school of the South African Air Force
