= Africa Aerospace and Defence Expo =

Annual trade show in South Africa

African Aerospace and Defence Expo
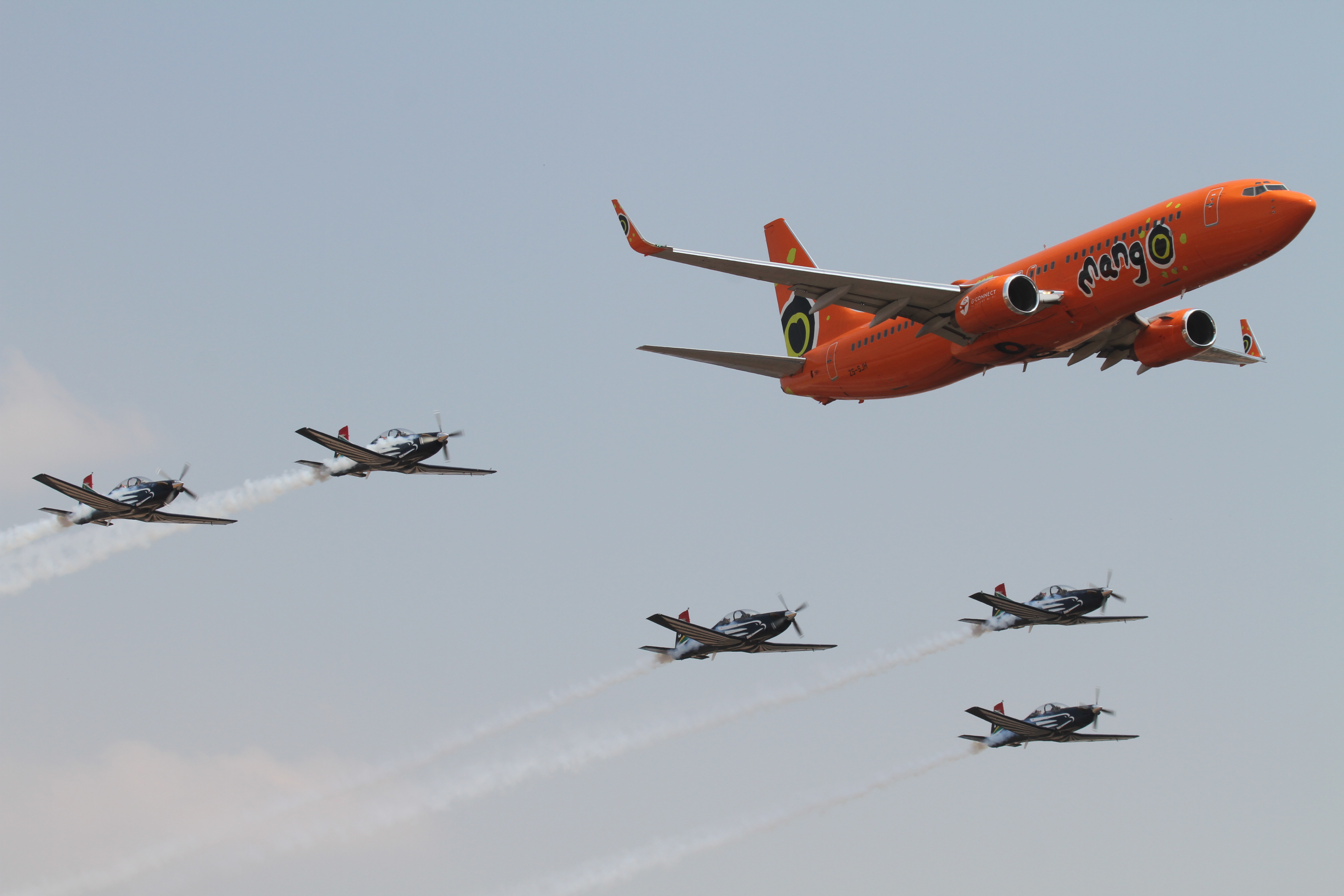
- A Mango Airlines 737 flies in formation with the South African Air Force Silver Falcons aerobatic team at AAD 2014
- Status: active
- Genre: trade exhibition and air show
- Dates: September
- Frequency: Biennial: Even years
- Venue: Waterkloof Air Force Base
- Locations: Centurion, Gauteng
- Country: South Africa
- Established: 1975; 51 years ago
- Most recent: 2024
- Next event: 2026
- Attendance: 45,862 (2016)
- Organizer: African Aerospace and Defence
- Website: www.aadexpo.co.za

The African Aerospace and Defence Expo (AAD) is an aerospace and defence exhibition held every two years at AFB Waterkloof, in Centurion, Gauteng, South Africa. The exhibition combines a trade exhibition and an air show.

The AAD began in 1975 when the South African based aviation magazine World Airnews determined that a professional aerospace exhibition was appropriate, as distinguished from the traveling "barnstorming" air shows that were then prominent.

The first event was held October 1975 as "Aviation Africa", at Lanseria Airport near Johannesburg, South Africa under the sponsorship of the Commercial Aviation Association of Southern Africa. The same year, Lt. General Bob Rogers of the South African Air Force instituted an open day at AFB Waterkloof, in Centurion, which eventually turned into the Defence Exhibition of South Africa (DEXSA).

In 2000, Aviation Africa and DEXSA combined to become AAD. In 2006, the exhibition moved to AFB Ysterplaat in Cape Town. It returned to AFB Waterkloof in 2012.

The next AAD is scheduled for 16-20 September 2026.
