= Silver Falcons =

South African aerobatic display team

Silver Falcons South African Air Force Aerobatic Team
- Emblem of the SAAF Silver Falcons
- Active: 1953 – present
- Country: South Africa
- Branch: South African Air Force
- Role: Aerobatic flight display team
- Base: Langebaanweg
- Colours: Red, Green, Blue, Black and White

Aircraft flown
- Trainer: 1946–19?? T-6 Harvard; 19??–195? de Havilland Vampire; 1966–1998 Aermacchi MB-326 "Impala"; 1998–present Pilatus PC-7 Mk II

The Silver Falcons is the aerobatic display team of the South African Air Force. Based at Air Force Base Langebaanweg near Cape Town, the Silver Falcons fly the Pilatus PC-7 Mk II, the basic trainer of the SA Air Force in a 5-ship routine. The main purpose of the Silver Falcons is to enhance the image of the South African Air Force, encourage recruitment and instill national pride through public display.

== History ==
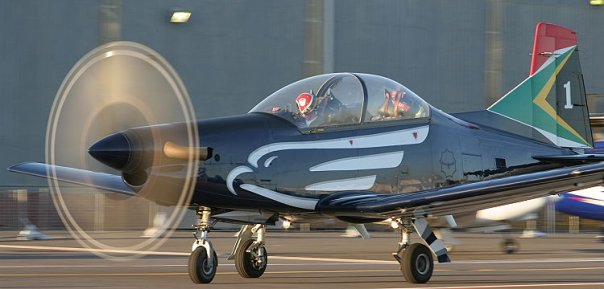
current Silver Falcons paint scheme

Originally formed in 1953 as the Bumbling Bees and flying the T-6 Harvard and then the de Havilland Vampire. The Bumbling Bees flew a 4 ship formation and made a name for themselves by regularly taking part in South African airshows. The team disbanded in the late 1950s leaving a gap in South African aviation.

During 1966 the Aermacchi MB-326 "Impala" arrived and the Bumbling Bees were reinstated under the command of Colonel Chris Prins. The Silver Falcons were based at Air Force Base Langebaanweg on the West Coast of South Africa, near Cape Town. The team went from strength to strength and the idea to change the name to a more bilingual-sounding name came about. The Silver Falcons ("Die Silwer Valke" in Afrikaans) team was founded and gave their first display in November 1967 at the opening of the Atlas Aircraft Corporation.

During 1986, under the command of Commandant Dave Knoesen, the team was expanded to a 5 ship to bring about more exciting display postures and to include a solo display. The aircraft were also painted in orange, white and blue to represent the then current South African flag.

The Silver Falcons operated from Langebaanweg until the early 1990s, when all the Impala training was moved to Air Force Base Hoedspruit, in the Lowveld region of South Africa, and formed part of 85 Combat Flying School. During 1994 with a new national flag, the aircraft were repainted to represent the colours of the SA Air Force: blue, light blue and white.

The Silver Falcons continued to operate from Hoedspruit until in 1998, the Silver Falcons moved to AFB Langebaanweg and commenced training in the Pilatus Astra. The decision was partly made due to the shortage of flying instructors at 85 CFS and also to display the new turbo-prop trainer to the nation. During this move, the team was once again reduced to a 4 ship. For nine years, the team flew in the standard red and white paint scheme of the Astra fleet.

In 2008, 6 of the Astras were repainted in a unique blue and white livery and the team was expanded to a 5-ship again. Paint for the respray was donated by a local paint supplier, First African Paints. The first display in the new livery was flown at the Africa Aerospace and Defense Expo at AFB Ysterplaat in September 2008.

== Aircraft ==
The Pilatus PC-7 Mk II is a high performance single-engine turboprop aircraft, used by the South African Air Force for ab-initio training. It is powered by a 750 shp limited to 700 Pratt & Whitney PT6A-25C engine and is designed for G-loadings between +7 and −3.5 G, making it ideal for aerobatics. The aircraft has a tandem seat configuration with Martin Baker CH-11A ejection seats.

For all practical purposes the PC-7 Mk II can be seen as a hybrid between the PC-7 and the newer PC-9. Both these aircraft types are popular as military trainers and are in service with more than 30 air forces. Like the PC-9, the PC-7 Mk II features a larger cockpit, upgraded airframe and instruments and is fitted with a ventral airbrake, but it retains the smaller engine of the original PC-7.

Specifications

- Wing span — 10.19 m
- Length — 10.13 m
- Max Operating Speed — 300 knots (555 km/h)
- Maximum Mach Number — Mach 0.6
- Maximum Operating Altitude — 25 000 ft (7 622 m)
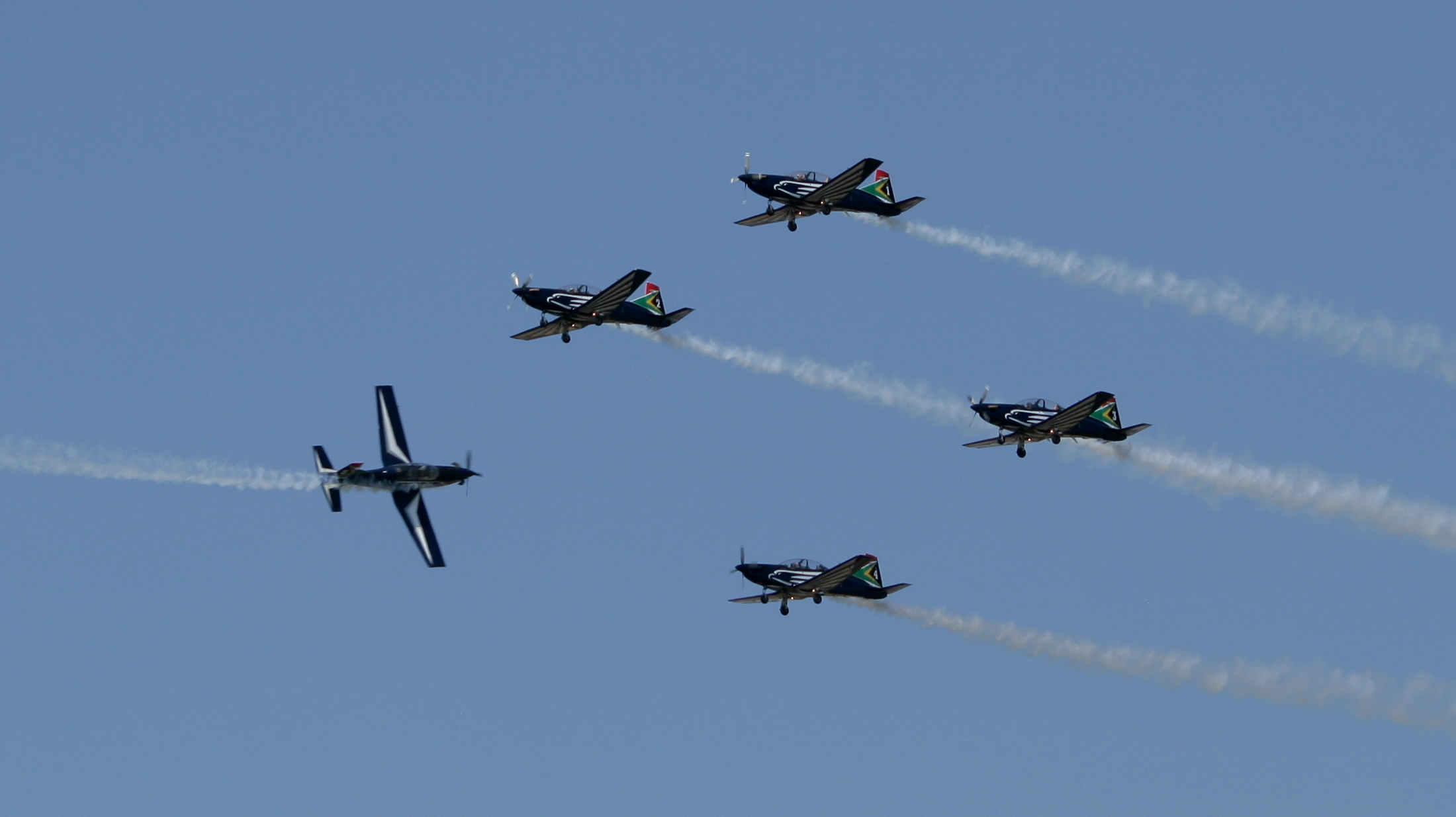
  Silver Falcons during a flight demo
- Stalling Speed (Clean) — 75 knots (139 km/h)
- Stalling Speed (Landing Configuration) — 65 knots (120 km/h)
- Minimum Speed For Ground Level Ejection — 65 knots (120 km/h)

== Accidents and incidents ==
- 16 April 1988 – Capt Kobus Griesel ejected from an Aermacchi MB-326 Impala after his engine caught fire during a display at Franschhoek.
- 2 October 1993 — During an airshow at Lanseria Airport, Falcon 5 crashed during a low-level solo display sequence. Capt Charlie Rudnick ejected moments after structural failure caused the right wing of his Impala Mk I to separate from the fuselage, but was killed on impact.

== Current team ==
The team consists of 5 display pilots, 3 support officers and 12 ground crew members. Falcon 1 is the formation leader, with Falcons 2–5 being the wingmen. All the team's pilots are serving instructors at the Central Flying School.

=== Team 67 ===
August 2008 – September 2008 September 2008 – October 2008

Falcon 1: Maj Scott Ternent
Falcon 2: Capt Guy du Sautoy
Falcon 3: Maj Alex Macphail
Falcon 4: Capt D Deetlefs
Falcon 5: Maj Nico Frylinck

=== Team 68 ===
September 2008 – October 2008

Falcon 1: Maj Scott Ternent
Falcon 2: Capt Guy du Sautoy
Falcon 3: Capt Buti Tsebe
Falcon 4: Capt D Deetlefs
Falcon 5: Maj Nico Frylinck

=== Team 69 ===
October 2008 – December 2008

Falcon 1: Maj Scott Ternent
Falcon 2: Capt Roy Sproul
Falcon 3: Capt Buti Tsebe
Falcon 4: Capt D Deetlefs
Falcon 5: Maj Nico Frylinck

=== Team 70 ===
January 2009 – December 2010

Falcon 1: Maj Scott Ternent (Leader)
Falcon 2: Capt Roy Sproul
Falcon 3: Capt Buti Tsebe
Falcon 4: Capt Gerhard Lourens
Falcon 5: Maj Nico Frylinck (Soloist)
Ancillary Members:

Ground Liaison Officer: Capt Heybrech van Niekerk
Public Relations Officer: 2Lt Brian Goldschmidt

=== Team 71 ===
March 2011 – December 2011

Falcon 1 – Capt Roy Sproul (Leader)
Falcon 2 – Capt Heybrech van Niekerk (first female member)
Falcon 3 – Capt Buti Tsebe
Falcon 4 – Capt Gerhard Lourens
Falcon 5 – Maj Beau Skarda (Soloist)

=== Team 72 ===
December 2011 – May 2012

Falcon 1 – Maj Roy Sproul (Leader)
Falcon 2 – Capt Heybrech van Niekerk (first female member)
Falcon 3 – Lt Jacques Poolman
Falcon 4 – Capt Gerhard Lourens
Falcon 5 – Maj Beau Skarda (Soloist)

=== Team 73 ===
Falcon 1 – Maj Roy Sproul (Leader)
Falcon 2 – Maj Werner Vermaak
Falcon 3 – Lt Jacques Poolman
Falcon 4 – Maj Heybrech van Niekerk (first female member)
Falcon 5 – Maj Beau Skarda (Soloist)
Ancillary Members:

Ground Liaison Officer: Capt Mark Gentles
Public Relations Officer: Lt Brian Goldschmidt

=== Team 74 ===
Falcon 1 – Maj Roy Sproul (Leader)
Falcon 2 – Capt Mark Gentles
Falcon 3 – Lt Jacques Poolman
Falcon 4 – Maj Werner Vermaak
Falcon 5 – Maj Beau Skarda (Soloist)
Ancillary Members:

Ground Liaison Officer: Capt Loedolff Muller
Public Relations Officer: Lt Brian Goldschmidt

=== Team 75 ===
Falcon 1 – Maj Beau Skarda (Leader)
Falcon 2 – Capt Mark Gentles
Falcon 3 – Capt Loedolff Muller
Falcon 4 – Maj Werner Vermaak
Falcon 5 – Capt Jacques Poolman (Soloist)
Ancillary Members:

Ground Liaison Officer: Still to be elected.
Public Relations Officer: Capt Christo Jansen

=== Team 76 ===
Falcon 1 – Maj Beau Skarda (Leader)
Falcon 2 – Maj Marc Bennett
Falcon 3 – Maj Loedolff Muller
Falcon 4 – Maj Werner Vermaak
Falcon 5 – Maj Mark Gentles (Soloist)

Major Jacques Poolman (official reservist)

=== Team 77 ===
Falcon 1 – Maj Werner Vermaak (Leader)
Falcon 2 – Maj Marc Bennett
Falcon 3 – Capt Jacques Poolman
Falcon 4 – Maj Loedolff Mûller
Falcon 5 – Maj Mark Gentles (Soloist)

=== Team 78 ===
Falcon 1 – Maj Werner Vermaak (Leader)
Falcon 2 – Maj Marc Bennett
Falcon 3 – Maj Shaun Constable
Falcon 4 – Maj Loedolff Mûller
Falcon 5 – Maj Mark Gentles (Soloist)

=== Team 79 ===
Falcon 1 – Maj Mark Gentles (Leader)
Falcon 2 – Maj James Wilcox
Falcon 3 – Capt Omphile Mutloane
Falcon 4 – Maj Marc Bennett
Falcon 5 – Maj Shaun Constable (Soloist)

=== Team 80 ===
Falcon 1 – Maj Mark Gentles (Leader)
Falcon 2 – Maj James Wilcox
Falcon 3 – Major Sivuyile Tangana
Falcon 4 – Capt Wendy Badenhorst
Falcon 5 – Capt Omphile Mutloane (Soloist)
