= 105 Squadron SAAF =

105 Squadron
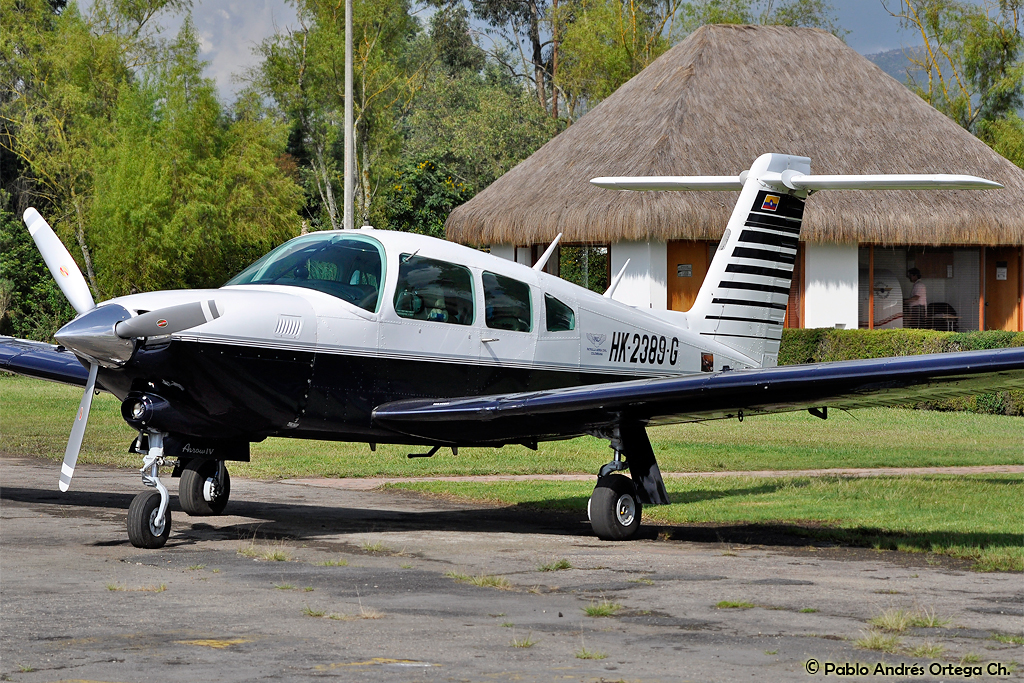
- Piper PA-28 Turbo Arrow: Example of the type of privately owned aircraft use by the squadron
- Country: South Africa
- Branch: South African Air Force
- Role: Citizen Force liaison and crime prevention patrol squadron
- Garrison/HQ: AFB Durban
- Motto: Sizula Phezulu

Insignia
- 105 Squadron Insignia

105 Squadron is a territorial reserve squadron of the South African Air Force. The squadron operations include coastal reconnaissance, command and control and radio relay in crime prevention operations in co-operation with the South African Police and Army. The squadron is based at AFB Durban. These reserve squadrons are used to fill a pilot and aircraft gap within the SAAF by making use of civilian pilots and their privately owned aircraft. Most flying takes place over weekends and because pilots have a good knowledge of the local terrain in the area where they live and commonly fly, the squadron is mostly used in a crime prevention role.
