= Virginia Airport =

Virginia Airport ICAO (FAVG) Virginia Airport
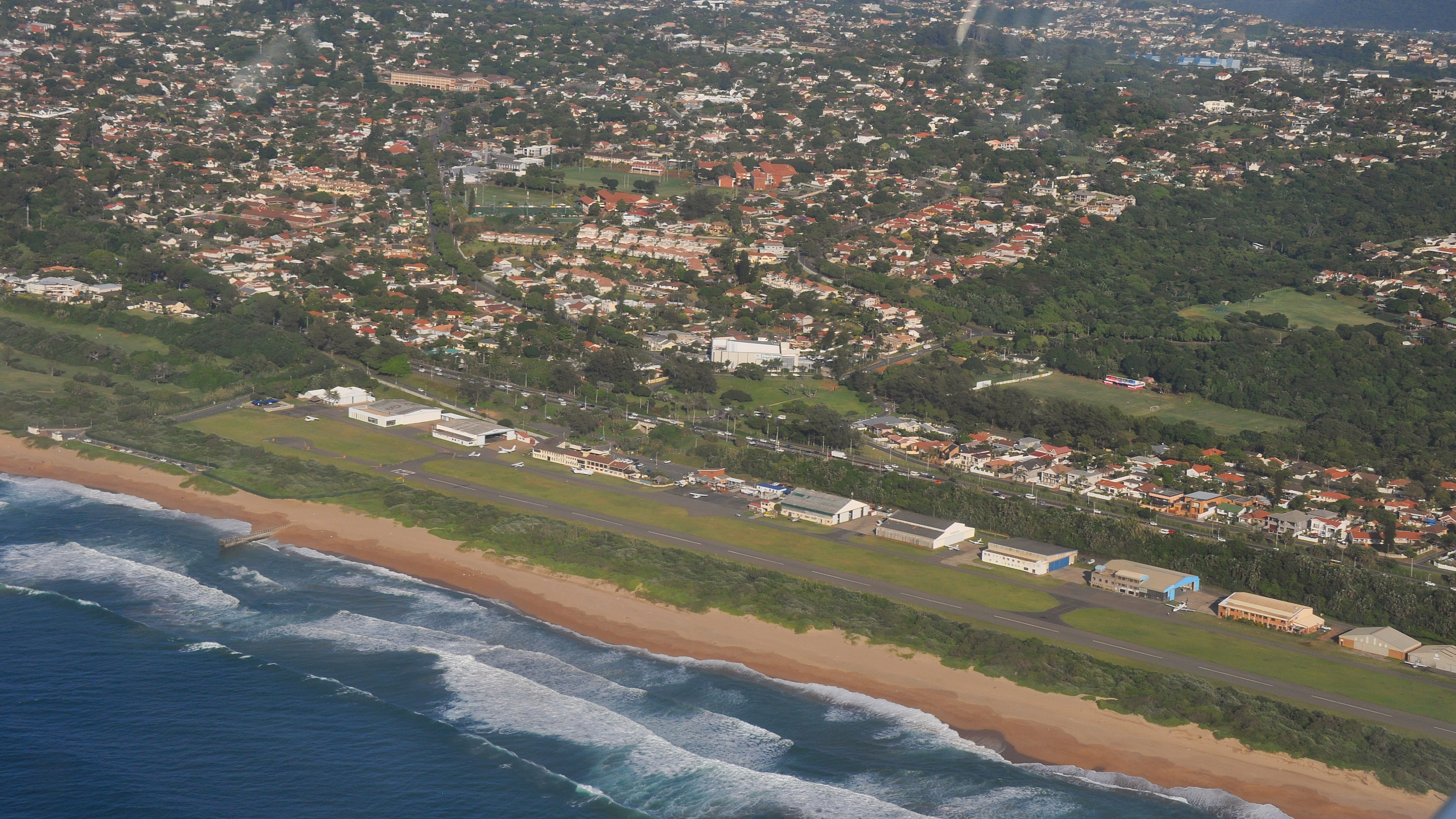
- IATA: VIR; ICAO: FAVG

Summary
- Airport type: Public
- Owner: eThekwini Municipality
- Operator: Indiza Airport Management
- Serves: Durban, South Africa
- Elevation AMSL: 20 ft (6.1 m)
- Coordinates: 29°46′14″S 031°03′30″E

Map
- Durban North

Runways
Direction	Length		Surface
Direction	m	ft	Surface
05/23	925	3,035	Asphalt

Virginia Airport (IATA: VIR, ICAO: FAVG) is an airport serving Durban, the largest city in the province of KwaZulu-Natal in South Africa. This general aviation airport is located 10 kilometres (5.4 nautical miles) north east of Durban.

This airport was the home of the Durban Airshow before it ran into problems by failing to meet new public safety standards. The Durban Airshow was eventually permanently cancelled due to the close proximity of the crowd line to the runway. In 2024, the airshow returned, although with a limited display of aircraft. Virginia Airport primarily serves as a training ground for pilots of varying skills.

The airport was threatened to be closed down in December 2018. The plan was to replace it by a development which would have comprised a hotel, upmarket residential houses as well as leisure and related developments. It was planned to build a new airport in Scottburgh on the South Coast of Durban, what did not materialize because it was disliked by the current Virginia Airport users because it is too far away from the city.

== Facilities ==
The airport is at an elevation of 20 feet (6 m) above mean sea level. It has one runway designated 05/23 with an asphalt surface measuring 925 by 22 metres (3,035 ft × 72 ft).

The airport is home to the Durban Wings Club and thus boasts having one of the oldest flying clubs in the country.

== History ==
Virginia Airport was officially opened by the then Mayor of Durban, W E Shaw in June 1959. The opening was commemorated by an air race which ended at Virginia. The decision to open a new airport was motivated by the need to relocate the light aircraft operating out of the Stamford Hill Aerodrome to a more suitably sized aerodrome. At the time the airport commenced operations it was noted that there were no houses in the vicinity and plenty of room for expansion.

Initially, just two hangars were relocated from Stamford Hill to Virginia and a few smaller buildings were built. Those same hangars are still in use today.

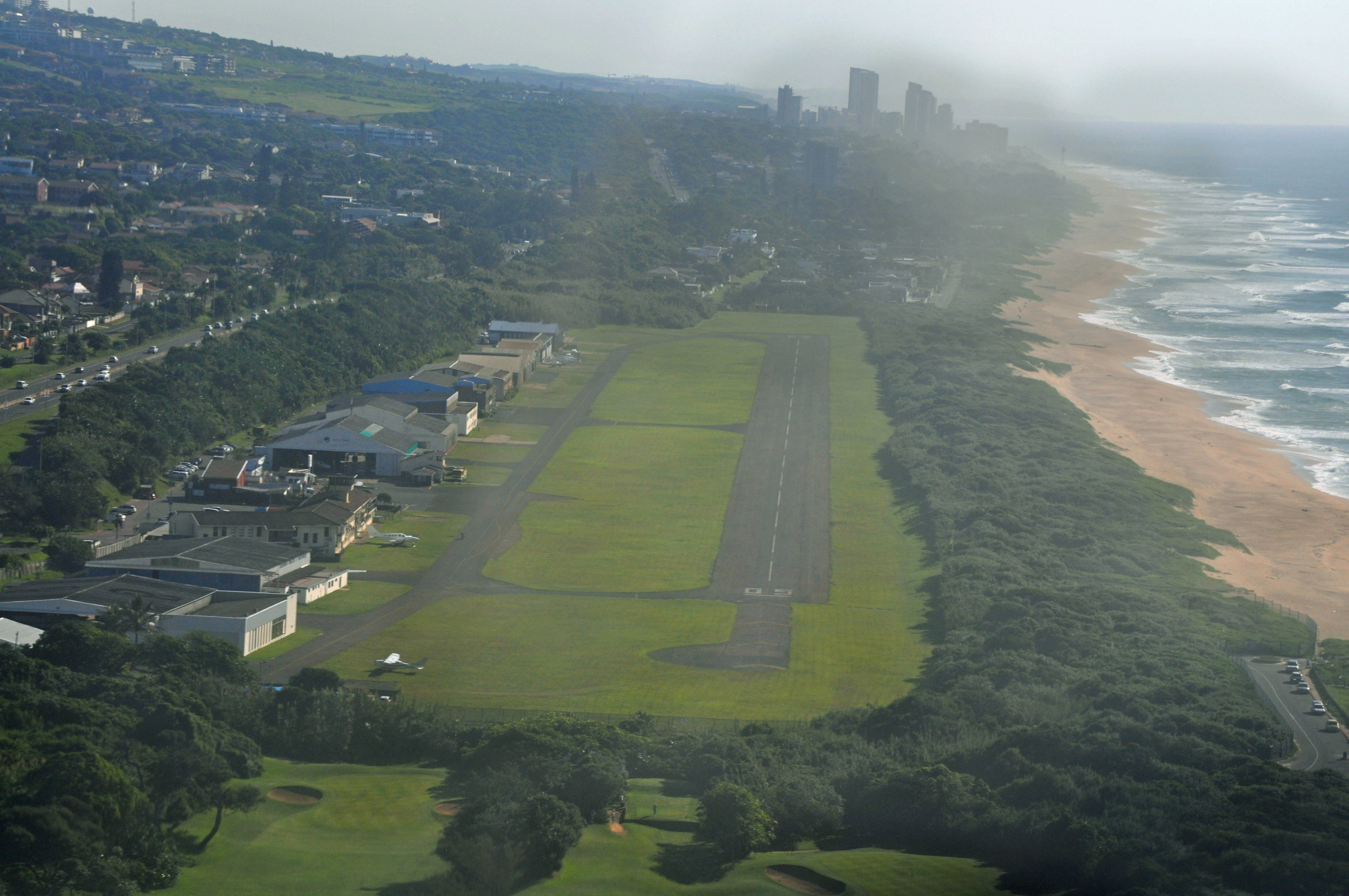
Runway as seen on the approach.

== See also ==
- List of airports in the Durban area
