= List of airports in the Durban area =

The following are airports serving the Durban area.

== List ==
Locations of the airports in the Durban metropolitan area

Airport name	ICAO	IATA	Coordinates	Elevation
Commercial airports				
King Shaka International Airport	FALE	DUR	29°36′52″S 31°06′59″E	90 m / 295 ft
~~Durban International Airport~~	~~FADN~~	~~DUR~~	~~29°57′56″S 30°56′57″E~~	~~10 m / 33 ft~~
General aviation airports				
Virginia Airport	FAVG	VIR	29°46′14″S 31°03′30″E	6 m / 20 ft
Military airports				
AFB Durban	FADN		29°57′56″S 30°56′57″E	10 m / 33 ft

== See also ==
- List of airports in South Africa
