= Air Force Base Langebaanweg =

AFB Langebaanweg Air Force Base Langebaanweg
- IATA: SDB; ICAO: FALW

Summary
- Airport type: Military
- Operator: South African Air Force
- Location: Langebaan (West Coast District Municipality), Western Cape, South Africa
- Elevation AMSL: 108 ft (33 m)
- Coordinates: 32°58′08″S 18°09′55″E
- Website: www.af.mil.za

Map
- Location in the Western Cape

Runways
Direction	Length		Surface
Direction	ft	m	Surface
02R/20L	7,689	2,344	Asphalt
02L/20R	7,680	2,341	Asphalt
07/25	4,935	1,504	Asphalt
16/34	6,533	1,991	Asphalt

AFB Langebaanweg (IATA: SDB, ICAO: FALW) is an airbase of the South African Air Force (SAAF).

The base motto is Tenax Propisiti Vinco – Through Tenacity Comes Success.

== Units hosted ==
- Central Flying School SAAF - Pilot and instructor training
- 2 Air Servicing Unit - Technical support
- 526 Squadron - Protection Squadron
- Aviation fire fighters

== Current aircraft ==
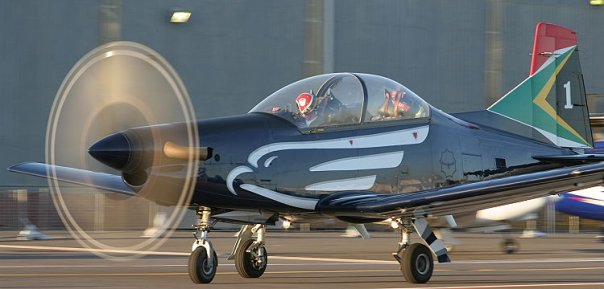
The current Silver Falcons paint scheme.

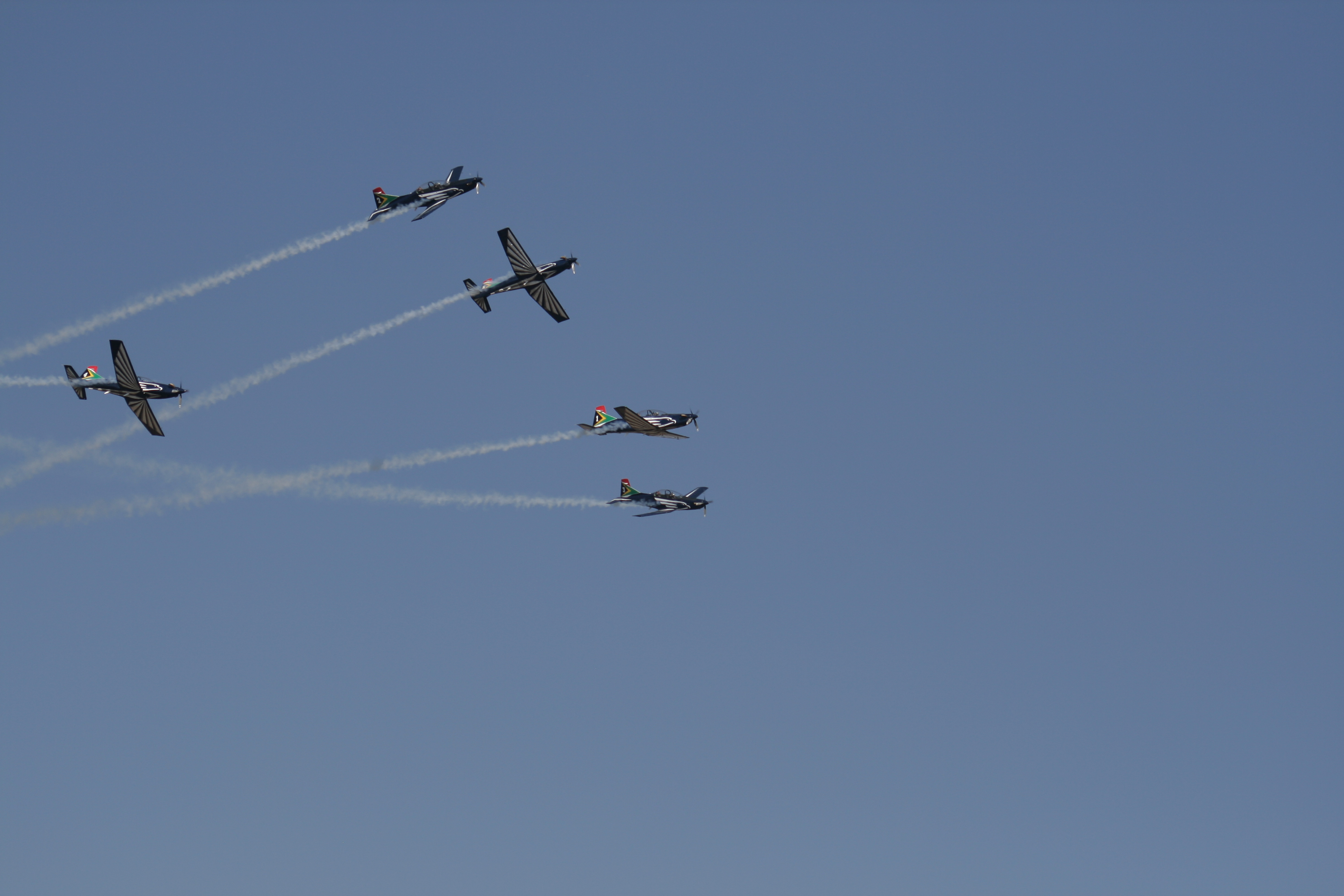
Silver Falcons performing in the Pilatus PC-7

The Central Flying School operates 60 Pilatus PC-7s from AFB Langebaanweg. The SAAF's Silver Falcons display team is based at AFB Langbaanweg.
