= Air Force Base Durban =

AFB Durban Air Force Base Durban
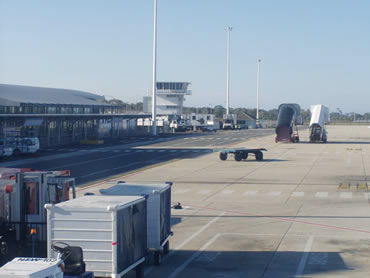
- IATA: ~~DUR~~; ICAO: FADN

Summary
- Airport type: Military
- Operator: South African Air Force
- Location: Durban, KwaZulu-Natal, South Africa
- Elevation AMSL: 33 ft (10 m)
- Coordinates: 29°58′07″S 030°56′52″E
- Website: www.af.mil.za asca.co.za

Map
- Location in the Durban metropolitan area

Runways
| Direction | Length | | Surface |
| Direction | ft | m | Surface |
|---|---|---|---|
| 06/24 | 8,005 | 2,440 | Asphalt |
- Co-located with Durban International Airport

AFB Durban (ICAO: FADN) is an airbase of the South African Air Force, located in Durban, KwaZulu-Natal, South Africa. The runway is shared with the (now defunct) Durban International Airport (since September 1956). The airbase is at the northern end of the runway.

== Status following closure of Durban International Airport ==
As of August 2016 no replacement site has been provided for 15 Squadron, which is still based at the airport. As a helicopter unit it does not require a large airfield with runways.

== Aviation ==
- Non-directional beacon - DU393.0
- VHF omnidirectional range - DNV112.5
- Automatic Terminal Information Service - 127.0

It is home to 15 Squadron which currently operates Atlas Oryx and BK 117 helicopters. Their primary role is maritime and landward search and rescue. Two flights of Oryx are based in Durban and C Flight, consisting of four BK 117s is detached to Port Elizabeth. C Flight's conversion to AgustaWestland AW109 helicopters has been postponed due to delays in developing emergency flotation equipment for the type, thus precluding its use in a maritime environment.

== Units hosted ==
- 15 Squadron- Helicopters
- 508 Squadron
- 105 Squadron - Citizen Force liaison and crime prevention patrol squadron. Reserve squadron operating various civil light aircraft by mostly civilian pilots.

== See also ==
- List of airports in the Durban area
