= 87 Helicopter Flying School SAAF =

Coordinates: 29.1000°S 26.3069°E

87 Helicopter Flying School
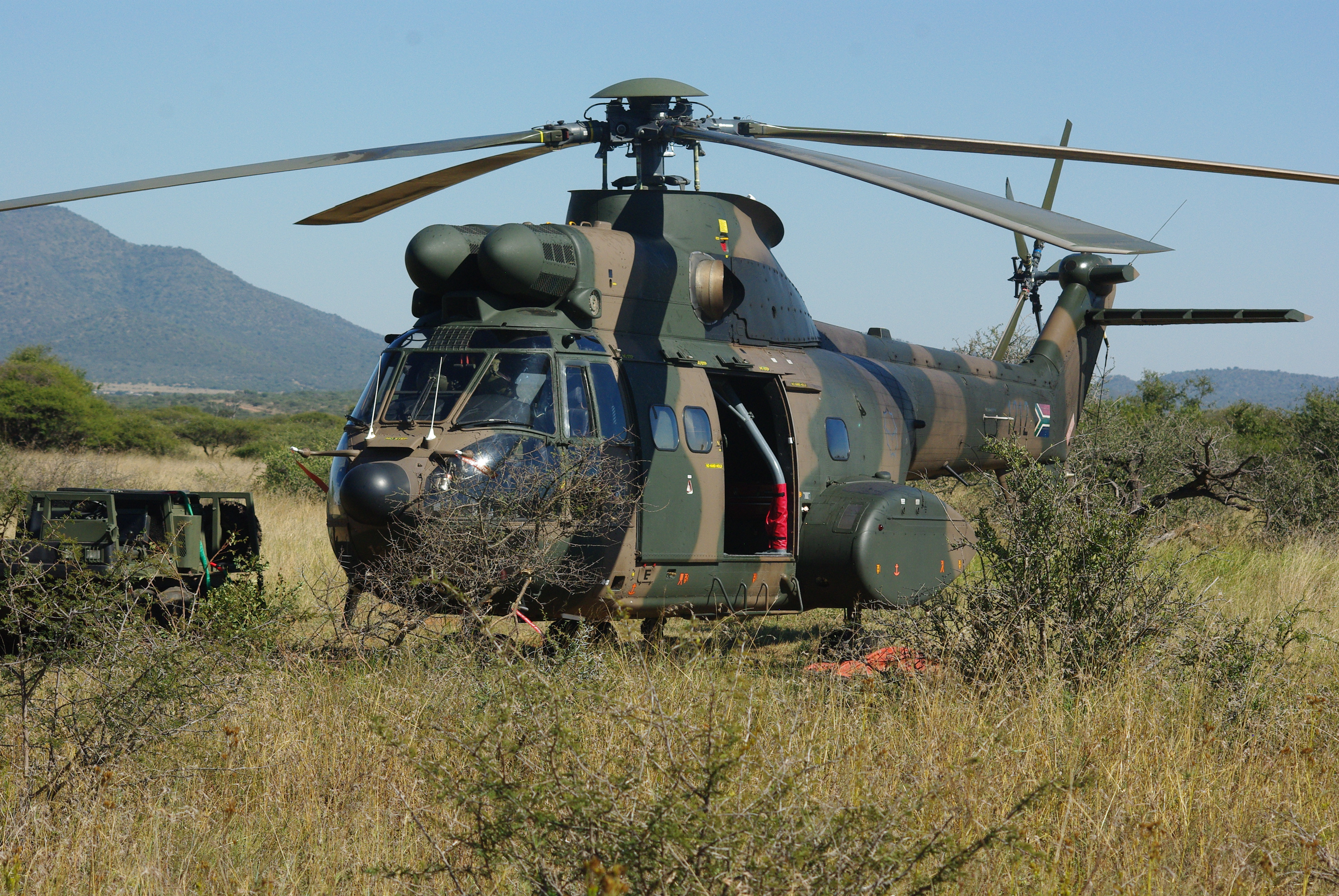
- Atlas Oryx
- Active: 1 January 1973 – Present
- Country: South Africa
- Branch: South African Air Force
- Role: Helicopter flight training
- Current base: AFB Bloemspruit, Bloemfontein (plus a satellite base at Dragon Peaks Mountain Resort, Drakensberg)
- Motto(s): Docemus (We Teach)
- Current Aircraft: Atlas Oryx, BK 117, A109

Aircraft flown
- Helicopter: Previously flown: Aérospatiale Alouette II, Aérospatiale Alouette III

87 Helicopter Flying School is a unit of the South African Air Force. It is a helicopter flight training school.

The Helicopter Conversion Unit was established at Ysterplaat on 1 February 1968 to fulfill the helicopter pilot and flight engineers training role. The present unit was formed on 9 April 1968 by redesignating Training Flight, 17 Squadron at AFB Ysterplaat. The unit, equipped with Alouette II and III's, took over responsible for Helicopter Conversion Training of SAAF pilots and training of Flight Engineers for the SAAF.

The Helicopter Conversion Unit became an autonomous unit in 1971 and in January 1973 the units name changed to 87 Advanced Flying School. In 1973 the Alouette II's were retired and transferred to the Rhodesian Air Force. "B" Flight, 16 Squadron, also stationed at AFB Ysterplaat, took responsibility for advanced helicopter training from 16 September 1974 to January 1975.
