= Pilatus PC-7 =

Trainer aircraft family by Pilatus of Switzerland

PC-7
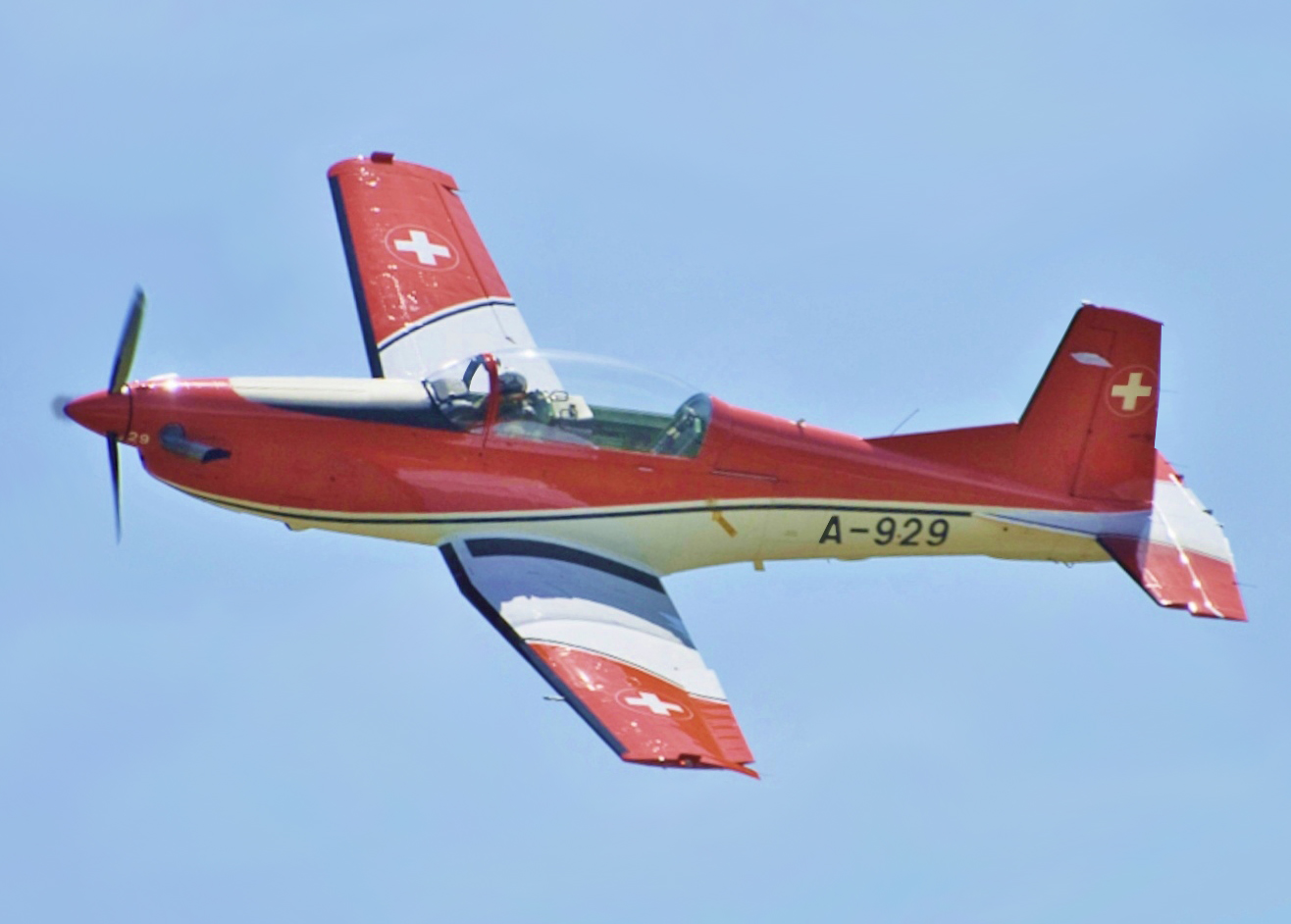
- PC-7 Team of the Swiss Air Force

General information
- Type: Trainer aircraft
- Manufacturer: Pilatus Aircraft
- Status: In service
- Primary users: Mexican Air Force Indian Air Force; South African Air Force; Royal Malaysian Air Force
- Number built: >618

History
- Manufactured: 1966–present
- Introduction date: PC-7: 1978; PC-7 Mk.II M: 1994; PC-7 MKX: 2021
- First flight: PC-7: 12 April 1966; 60 years ago (prototype); 18 August 1978; 48 years ago (production); PC-7 Mk.II M: 28 September 1992; 34 years ago
- Developed from: Pilatus P-3
- Developed into: Pilatus PC-9

The Pilatus PC-7 Turbo Trainer is a low-wing tandem-seat training aircraft, designed and manufactured in Switzerland by Pilatus Aircraft. The aircraft is capable of all basic training functions, including aerobatics, instrument, tactical, and night flying.

The PC-7 was developed from the preceding piston-powered Pilatus P-3, largely differing by the adoption of a turboprop engine, a bubble canopy, and a new one-piece wing. Introduced during the 1970s, it has since developed a sizable presence of the global trainer market. The type has been adopted by in excess of twenty air forces as their ab initio trainer, as well as multiple civilian operators. Over one million hours have reportedly been flown by PC-7s worldwide. In addition to training operations, some aircraft are armed and have been used for combat missions by several customers, including Chad, Iran, and Mexico, often in violation of the relevant export agreement between the customer and the Swiss government.

An improved model of the aircraft, the PC-7 Mk.II M, was developed during the 1990s, by combining the newer airframe and avionics from the PC-9 with the PC-7's smaller turbine engine. Reportedly, in excess of 600 PC-7s have been sold to various operators, the majority of which are in service. In Pilatus' range of aircraft, the PC-7 has been succeeded by the newer PC-9 and PC-21 trainers.

== Development ==
=== Origins ===
Work on what would become the PC-7 commenced during the 1960s. It was based on the earlier piston-powered Pilatus P-3, the initial prototype being produced from the existing prototype P-3, principally differing by the substitution of its Lycoming O-435 engine with a Pratt & Whitney PT6A-20 turboprop power-plant. On 12 April 1966; 60 years ago, the modified prototype performed its maiden flight. However, the PC-7 programme was abruptly shelved following an accident involving the aircraft. The termination of work was reportedly driven by a lack of market interest.

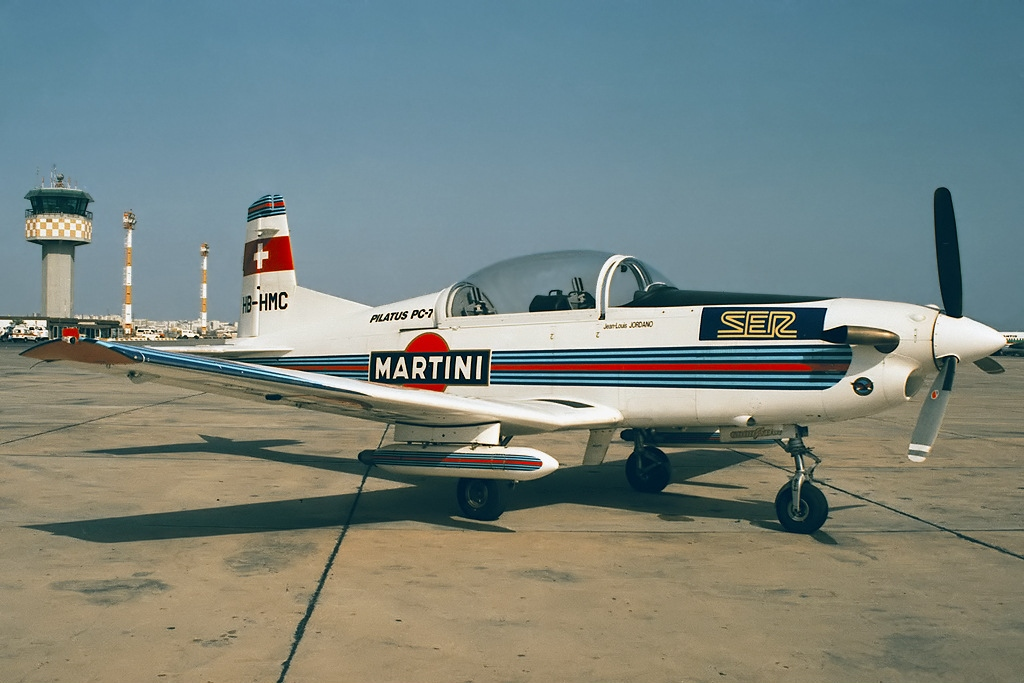
A Swiss-registered PC-7, fitted with additional 240 L (53 imp gal; 63 US gal) fuel drop tanks under each wing, 1987.

During 1973, it was decided to restart work on the programme; factors for its revival had included the 1973 oil crisis, the launch of the rival Beechcraft T-34C Turbo-Mentor, and the increasing age of existing trainer aircraft. To support the relaunch, another P-3 was obtained from the Swiss Air Force. After modifications, this aircraft first flew on 12 May 1975; 51 years ago. Further extensive modifications followed later in the programme, including the adoption of a new one-piece wing complete with integral fuel tanks, along with an altered tail fin and a bubble canopy. The flight test programme came to a close during Autumn 1977.

On 18 August 1978; 48 years ago, the first production aircraft made its first flight. On 5 December of that year, Switzerland's Federal Office of Civil Aviation (FOCA) issued civil certification for the PC-7; immediately thereafter, initial deliveries of production aircraft commenced to customers Burma and Bolivia. Over time, sales of the PC-7 generated considerable profits, allowing the company to finance the development of further types of aircraft.

=== Further development ===
The PC-7 Mk.II M is a development of the PC-9's airframe and avionics, which was powered by the PC-7's smaller turbine engine, which reportedly achieved lower operating and maintenance costs. This variant was developed at the behest of the South African Air Force (SAAF), who later adopted the type. A batch of 60 PC-7 Mk.II Ms were locally assembled in South Africa using kits supplied by Pilatus for the SAAF; due to political considerations, these aircraft were not fitted with the armament hardpoints. Deliveries to the SAAF took place between late 1994 and 1996.

In addition to Pilatus' own improvement programmes, several third-party companies have independently developed their own upgrades for customer's PC-7. During the late 1990s, Israeli engineering firm Radom began offering a kit of new avionics for the type, which included a new mission computer, a wide-angle head-up display, along with various replacement communications and weapons-delivery systems.

During July 1998, Pilatus announced that it has come to an agreement with American company Western Aircraft, for the latter to act as a distributor for the PC-7 across the North American civil aviation market. At this time, there were already five civil-registered PC-7s in operation in North America; Pilatus believed that the region could be a viable market for both remanufactured and newly built examples of the type, which would be priced between $1 million and $2 million respectively. It was recognised that this market was limited, Western Aircraft expected to sell only a few aircraft per year.

== Operational history ==
=== General use ===
All export sales of the PC-7 are subject to approval by the Swiss Government, whose authorisation is required prior to any delivery taking place. The sale of combat-capable aircraft has been a controversial matter at times, and political pressure has been applied for PC-7s to be shipped without the fittings for armaments being installed. The Swiss government has occasionally held up or outright refused to issue export licences for some nations, a move which has reportedly led to the loss of several potential sales, such as to South Korea and Mexico.

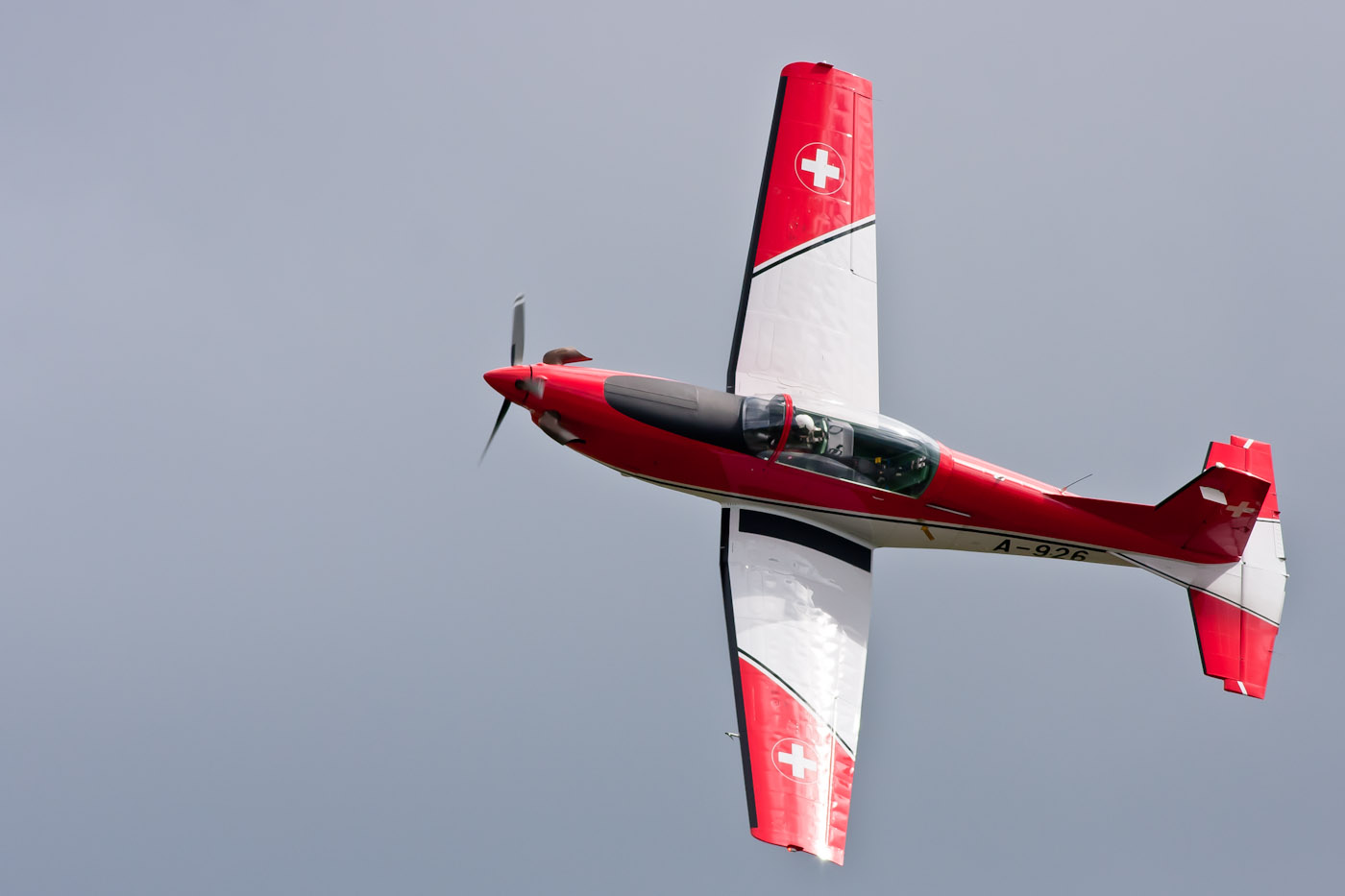
A PC-7 in-flight, 2012.

In addition to its adoption by numerous military customers, the PC-7 has also been used by private customers. It has been certified for civil use by both the Federal Office of Civil Aviation (FOCA) and the U.S. Federal Aviation Administration (FAA) as compliant with regulations pertaining to general aviation (GA) operations in both Europe and the United States. Amongst its uses in the civilian sector has been aerobatic displays.

During the 1990s, the PC-7 Mk.II M was adopted as the basic trainer of the Royal Brunei Air Force (RBAirF) alongside the BAE Systems Hawk jet trainer; the acquisition was seen a key to its expanded operations with fixed-wing aircraft.

==== India ====
On 19 June 2011, reports citing Le Temps indicated that the Indian Air Force (IAF) had selected Pilatus Aircraft to supply 75 PC-7 Mk.II Ms to serve the role of basic trainer aircraft at a cost of $1 billion. The contract could be further expanded to acquire around 200 units of the aircraft later. A tender for the project had been issued earlier in 2009. The contract was signed at a cost of ₹2,895.63 crore (US$541.87 million) or 500 million Swiss francs on 24 May 2012 after an approval was received from at a meeting of the Cabinet Committee on Security earlier in May. The deliveries of the aircraft and the complete training system which included an integrated ground-based training system would commence by the fourth quarter of 2012. The contract included a logistics support package for transfer of technology to Hindustan Aeronautics Limited for the maintenance of the fleet for 30 years; and an option clause with a validity of three years to acquire 38 additional aircraft. In 2013, the entire fleet was expected to be inducted by August 2015. The fast-tracked decision to procure a foreign aircraft over a domestically developed alternative proposed by Hindustan Aeronautics Limited (HAL) was a controversial one; retired Air Marshal Anil Chopra argued that HAL had no viable design for the role, and that the IAF could not have reasonably afforded the delay involved in the development of such an aircraft.

In 2014, there was a proposal to purchase an additional 106 aircraft from Pilatus in a separate deal worth ₹7,000 crore (US$1.31 billion) with a majority of the aircraft to be produced in India. The proposal, to be discussed at a meeting of the Defence Acquisition Council (DAC) on 22 November 2014, included an option to procure 38 complete aircraft from Pilatus with the remaining 68 being assembled by the Indian Air Force's 5 Base Repair Depot (BRD) at Sulur Air Force Station. The second option was for the direct importation of 10 aircraft and local production of 96 aircraft. A total of 53 aircraft from the order for 75 had been delivered by then.

The procurement of an additional 106 trainers under the 'Make & Buy' (Indian) category was repeatedly deferred. In 2017, the maintenance agreement with Pilatus lapsed, resulting in the IAF becoming solely responsible for the upkeep of the aircraft. In 2018, India announced that it had chosen to exercise the option of buying a batch of 38 trainers. However, as of 2020, the additional orders for PC-7 aircraft from IAF were cancelled in favour of the indigenous HAL HTT-40 from Hindustan Aeronautics Limited, the order for which was placed in 2022.

=== Combat use ===
A number of PC-7s were employed by the Guatemalan Air Force in air strikes and for close air support (CAS) during the Guatemalan civil war, starting in 1982, until the end of the conflict in 1996. The PC-7s were typically deployed from the airfield in La Aurora, being armed with a mixture of gun pods and rocket pods.

During the lengthy Iran–Iraq War of the 1980s, amid tensions between Iran and the United States, it is alleged that Iranian officials threatened to arm its PC-7 fleet with explosives and use them to launch suicide attacks against United States Navy (USN) vessels present in the Persian Gulf. Iran reportedly trained a number of suicide pilots and flew some operational missions, training was performed at Bushehr Air Base in Iran and overseas in North Korea. In early 1984, an Iranian attack helicopter AH-1J Sea Cobra was shot down by an Iraqi PC-7 during Operation Khyber (Iranian pilots Reza Moghadam and Mohammad Yazdi were rescued).

In 1994, the Mexican Air Force used several armed PC-7s to attack units of the Zapatista Army of National Liberation during the Chiapas conflict in Mexico. This action was considered illegal by the Swiss government because the aeroplanes were sold for training purposes only, and as result, Switzerland issued a ban on the sale of additional units to Mexico. At the time, the Mexican Air Force was the largest single export operator of the type, and had been seeking to acquire further PC-7s, thus the sales ban was viewed as an economic blow to Pilatus.

During the mid to late 1990s, Executive Outcomes, a private military contractor led by Eeben Barlow, utilised three armed PC-7s (ex-Bophuthatswana Air Force aircraft) to provide close air support (CAS) during its operations in Sierra Leone.

During the late 2000s, the Chadian Air Force reportedly used its small fleet of PC-7s to bomb rebel positions both in their own territory and in neighbouring Sudan. The Swiss government summoned the Chad's ambassador to request an explanation for these reports, as these actions breached the export agreements previously struck for the sale of the type to Chad.

First flight of the Dutch PC-7 MKX

=== PC-7 MKX evolution ===
A modernised variant of the PC-7 was announced in November 2021. This aircraft was ordered by France 2024, followed by the Netherlands in February 2025 and Belgium in November 2025.

The first flights took place:

- Dutch PC-7 MKX in September 2026.
- French PC-7 MKX in October 2026.

== Variants ==
- PC-7 : two-seat basic trainer aircraft, powered by PT6A-25A engine rated at 410 kilowatts (550 shaft horsepower).
- PC-7 Mk.II M : a development of the PC-9's airframe and avionics, retaining the PC-7's wing to mount external stores. Powered by PT6A-25C of 522 kilowatts (700 shaft horsepower) rather than more powerful PT6A-62 of PC-9. Developed for the South African Air Force (SAAF), and known as the 'Astra'; the aircraft is a hybrid PC-7 and PC-9, either a PC-7 'Heavy' or a PC-9 'Lite', depending on point of configuration.
- NCPC-7 : upgraded version of the standard PC-7 with fully IFR glass cockpit avionics, developed for the Swiss Air Force. The designation NCPC-7 has been provisionally used in the Swiss Air Force to differentiate modernized PC-7s (NC for New Cockpit) from those which were not yet done. It was removed after the improvement of the last of the 28 aircraft in 2009. Consequently, all the Turbo-Trainer took again the designation PC-7.
- PC-7 WE: upgraded variant of the NCPC-7 for the Swiss Air Force that includes: modification of the communication system, a TCAS (traffic collision avoidance system), ADF system extended (radiocompas), complete disassembly of the avionic and antennas to check for problems, complete disassembly and reassembly of the cables and repairs.
- PC-7 MKX: an updated version of the PC-7 Mk.II, with new avionics, cockpit displays, and integration with the ground-based training system (GBTS). The GBTS includes computer and simulator technology, along with new tools such as virtual reality and mixed reality. PC-7 MKX was announced at the Dubai Airshow in November 2021.

== Operators ==
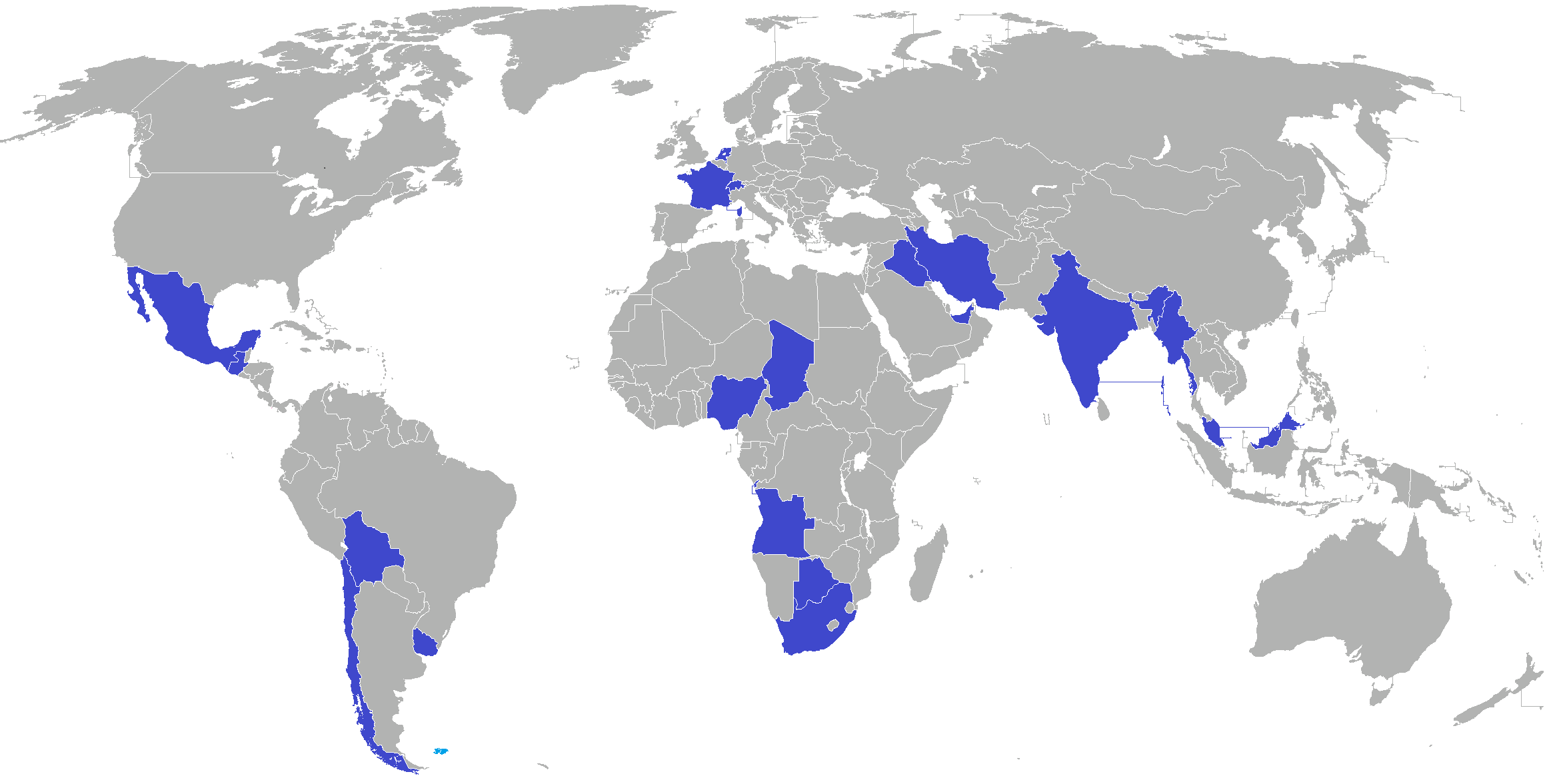
Main countries operating the Swiss Pilatus PC-7.

=== Military operators ===
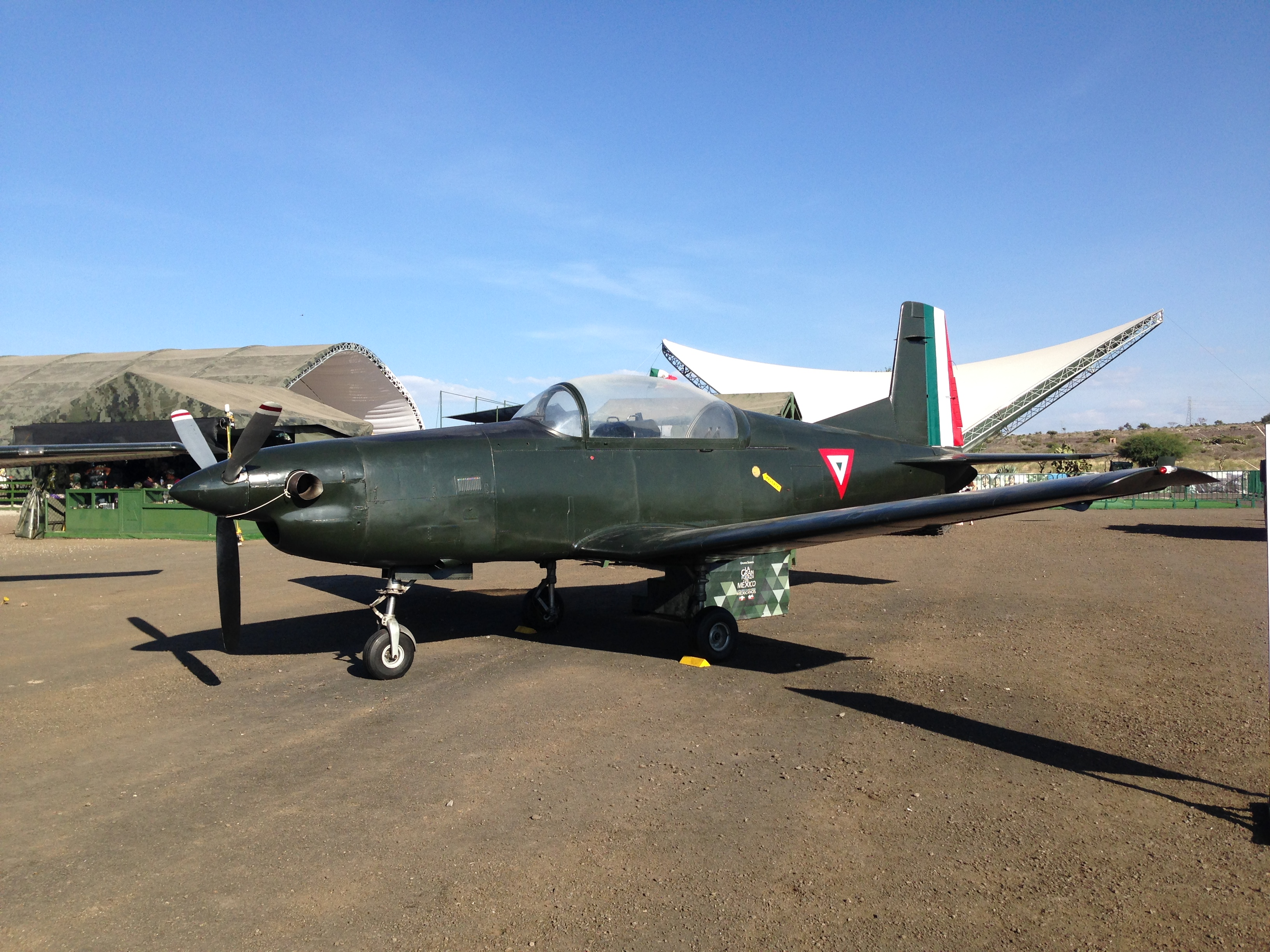
Pilatus PC-7 of the Mexican Air Force

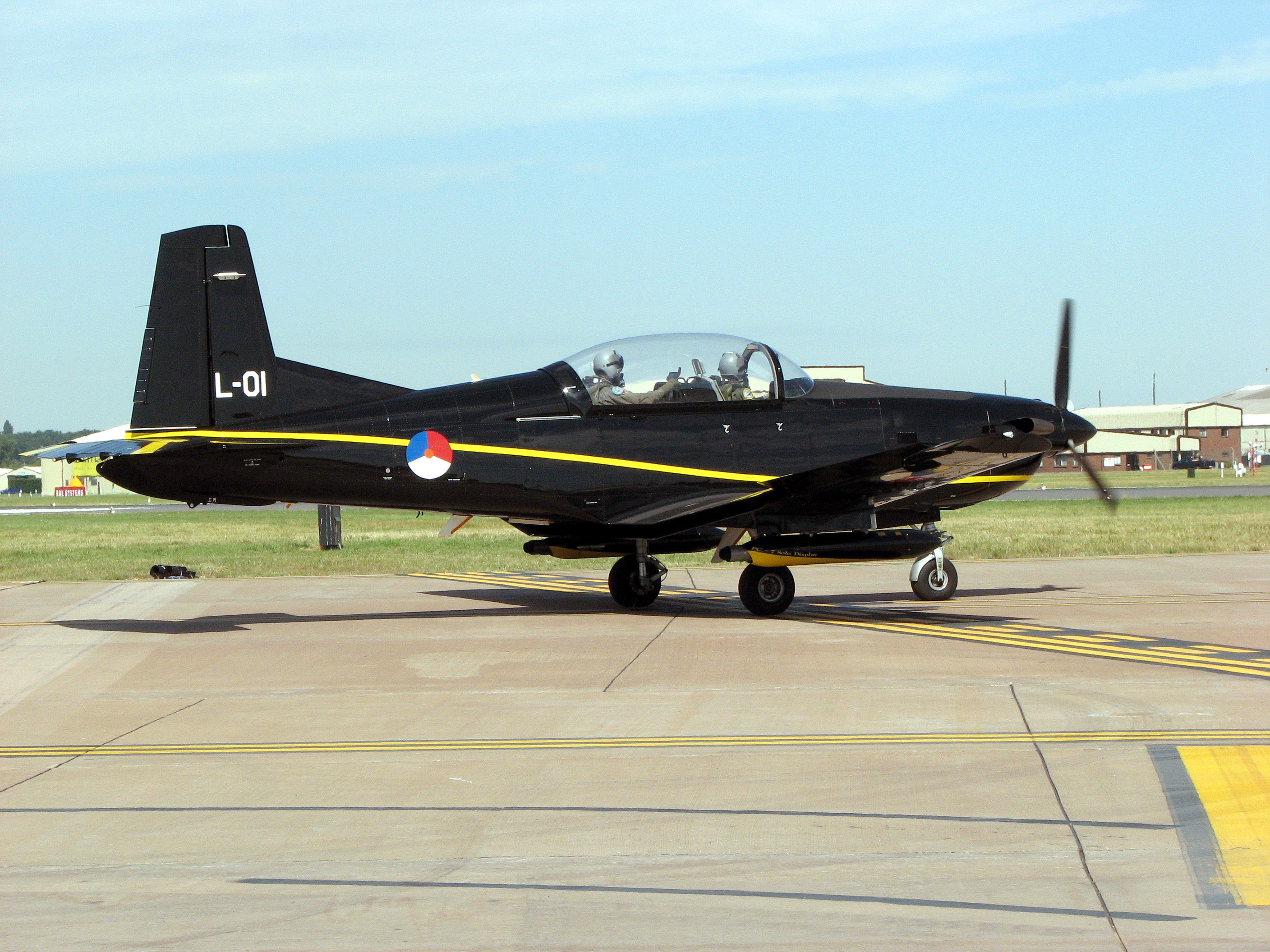
Pilatus PC-7 of the Royal Netherlands Air and Space Force

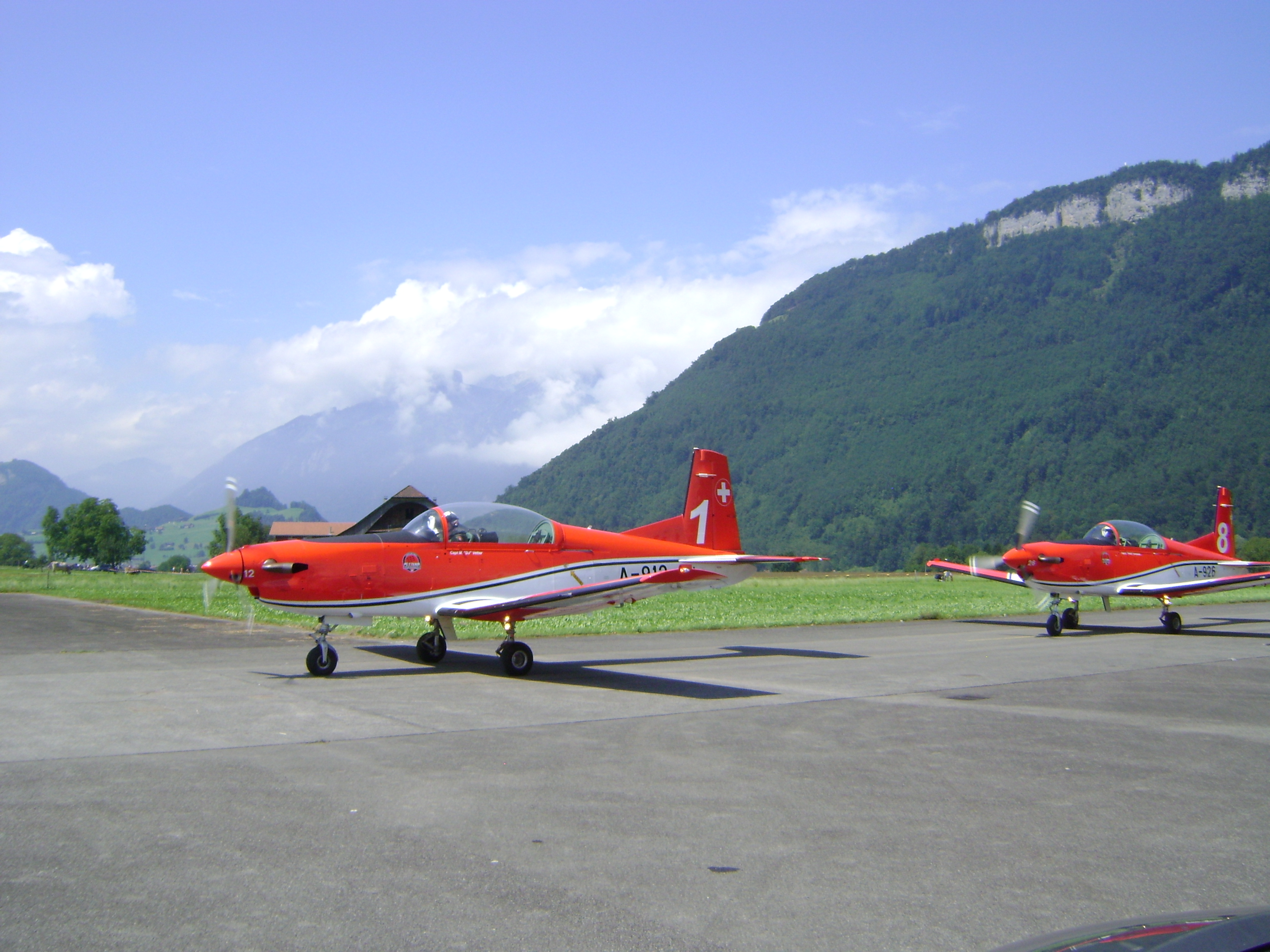
Pilatus NCPC-7 of the Swiss Air Force PC-7 Team

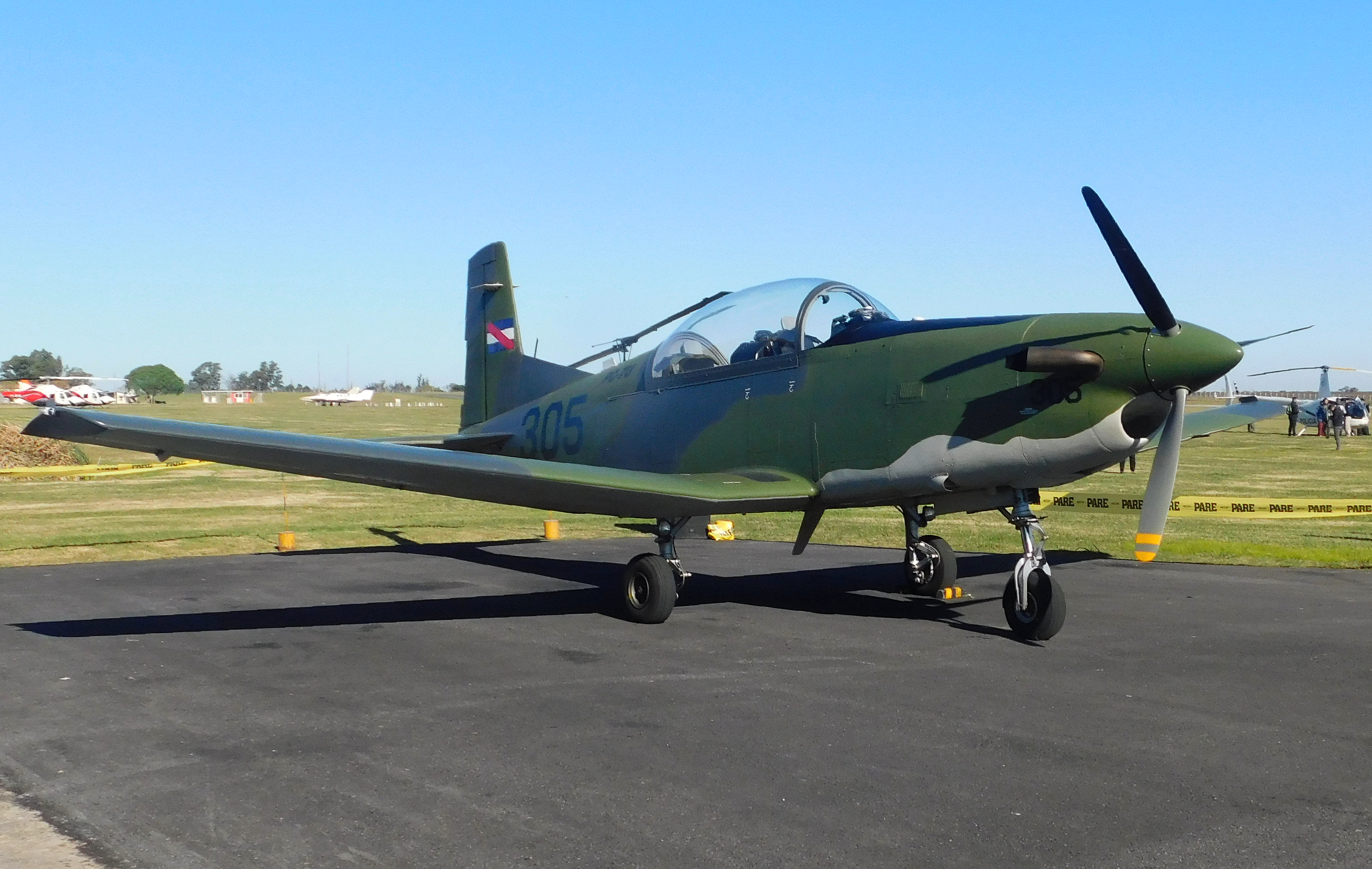
Pilatus PC-7U of the Uruguayan Air Force

An incomplete list of the users of the PC-7:

Angola
National Air Force of Angola: 12 PC-7 ordered in 1981, with deliveries starting in 1982, 8 others delivered in 1990. 5 aircraft lost. 16 PC-7 in service in 1994, 9 in 2003, 5 in 2016.
Austria
Austrian Air Force: 16 PC-7 aircraft in service as of October 2008, 13 aircraft remain in service as of December 2021.
Bolivia
Bolivian Air Force: 24 PC-7 aircraft in service as of October 2008, 2 remain in service as of December 2021.
Botswana
Botswana Defence Force Air Wing: seven PC-7 (delivered from 1990) aircraft in service as of October 2008, to be replaced by five PC-7 Mk.II M in 2013; five PC-7 Mk.II M aircraft formally accepted into service on 8 February 2013, removing six original PC-7s from service.
Brunei
Royal Brunei Air Force: four PC-7 Mk.II M aircraft in service as of October 2008, currently operated by No. 73 Squadron, and are also used by the RBAirF Alap-Alap Formation aerobatic display team.
Chad
Chad Air Force: two PC-7 aircraft remaining in service as of December 2021.
Chile
Chilean Navy: ten PC-7 aircraft in service as of October 2008, seven aircraft remain in service as of December 2021.
France
Direction générale de l'armement: six PC-7 aircraft in service as of October 2008.
Guatemala
Guatemalan Air Force: 12 PC-7 aircraft in service as of October 2008, one aircraft remaining in service as of December 2021.
India
Indian Air Force: 74 PC-7 Mk.II M, Additional order for 38 units cancelled. Orders placed for HAL HTT-40. Two PC-7s have been lost in crashes in December 2023 and November 2025.
Iran
Islamic Republic of Iran Air Force: 35 PC-7 aircraft in service as of October 2008, 34 aircraft remain in service as of December 2021.
Malaysia
Royal Malaysian Air Force: 30 PC-7 Turbo Trainers out of a first order of 44 (delivered from 1983), 45 PC-7 aircraft in service as of October 2008; 17 PC-7 Mk.II M out of a second order of 19 (delivered in two batches, nine from 2001 and ten from 2007); total of 47 currently in service; the type is also used by the Taming Sari aerobatic display team.
Mexico
Mexican Air Force: 88 PC-7 aircraft (first delivery May 1979) in service as of October 2008.
Myanmar
Myanmar Air Force: first customer of the PC-7, deliveries in early 1979, 17 PC-7 aircraft in service as of October 2008, 16 aircraft remain in service as of December 2021.
Netherlands
Royal Netherlands Air and Space Force: 13 PC-7 (first generation) aircraft in service, that will be replaced by 8 PC-7 MKX that were selected in October 2024, and with 2 simulators.
South Africa
South African Air Force: first customer of the PC-7 Mk.II M delivered 30 November 1994, 60 PC-7 Mk.II M aircraft in service as of October 2008, the type is also used by the Silver Falcons aerobatic display team.
Switzerland
Swiss Air Force: 40 PC-7 aircraft delivered from 1979 that remained in service as of October 2008 Nine have been used by the aerobatic display team PC-7 Team since 1989.
28 PC-7 upgraded with new cockpit in service in 2011 (standard NCPC). As of 2024, 27 remain in service. RUAG and Pilatus have been tasked to modernise the fleet to the standard PC-7 WE (valuation programme). The intention is to keep it in service until 2040.
United Arab Emirates
United Arab Emirates Air Force: 31 PC-7 aircraft in service as of October 2008, 31 aircraft remain in service as of December 2021.
Uruguay
Uruguayan Air Force: 6 PC-7 aircraft in service as of October 2008, 5 aircraft remain in service as of December 2021.

=== Aircraft ordered ===
Belgium
Belgian Air Force: 18 PC-7 MKX were selected in November 2025.
France
French Air and Space force and French Naval Aviation: 23 PC-7 MKX ordered as primary trainer with 12 simulators developed by Exail in December 2024. It will replace the Cirrus SR20 and the Grob G120A. Pilatus won the programme "Mentor 2". Babcock France will provide the training for the French military.
Netherlands
Royal Netherlands Air and Space Force: 8 PC-7 MKX were selected in October 2024, with 2 simulators, the contract was signed in February 2025.

=== Civilian operators ===
At least seven PC-7 aircraft are in service by various unspecified civilian operators as of October 2008.

=== Former military operators ===
Bophuthatswana
Bophuthatswana Air Force: two PC-7 (delivered from 1989), later transferred to South Africa Air Force and subsequently served in the Sierra Leone civil war and Chad)
Iraq
Iraq Air Force: 52 PC-7 (delivered from 1980)
Nigeria
Nigerian Air Force had two aircraft in service.
Suriname
Suriname Air Force had two PC-7 aircraft in service as of October 1986 of three ordered (one transferred to civilian operations).

=== Former civil operators ===
Switzerland
Swissair

== Accidents and incidents ==
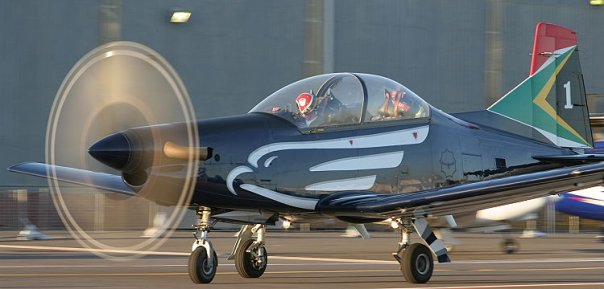
A Silver Falcons PC-7 Mk.II M, similar to the one that was in the South African Air Force incidents.

- The South African Air Force (SAAF) grounded their fleet of PC-7 Mk.II M aircraft after a crash on 15 January 2008. The aircraft went down shortly after takeoff from Overberg Air Force Base in the Western Cape Province. SAAF Lieutenant-Colonel Chris Meiring, 58, died shortly after the crash. The aircraft was flying to Langebaanweg Air Force Base for maintenance but shortly after takeoff it rolled and flew into the ground. The cause is believed to have been a structural problem.
- In March 2010, a pilot was killed when his Royal Malaysian Air Force (RMAF) aircraft exploded and caught fire in midair during a solo airshow. This is the fifth accident involving Royal Malaysian Air Force PC-7 aircraft.
- In June 2010, two Mexican pilots were killed when their Mexican Air Force PC-7 crashed after taking off from Pie de la Cuesta, a district in the resort city of Acapulco, Mexico. The PC-7 crashed into the sea near Acapulco.
- On 20 October 2011, two PC-7s of the Botswana Defence Force were involved in a mid-air collision over Letlhakeng 100 kilometres (62 miles) west of Gaborone. Two of the four aircrew involved were killed in the accident.
- On 12 September 2017, a pilot was killed when his Swiss Air Force PC-7 crashed at the Schreckhorn in Canton Bern on its way from Base aérienne Payerne to Base aérienne Locarno.
- On 4 December 2023, an Indian Air Force PC-7 crashed in Medak, Telangana, during training flight from Hyderabad. Both pilots died in the crash.
- On 14 November 2025, an Indian Air Force PC-7 crashed near Tambaram, during a training mission. The sole pilot ejected safely.

== Specifications (PC-7) ==
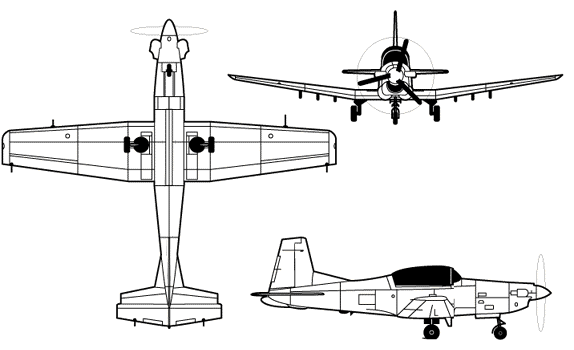
Pilatus PC-7

Data from

General characteristics

- Crew: two, pilot instructor and student pilot
- Capacity: two
- Length: 9.78 m (32 ft 1 in)
- Wingspan: 10.40 m (34 ft 1 in)
- Height: 3.21 m (10 ft 6 in)
- Wing area: 16.60 m^{2} (178.7 sq ft)
- Aspect ratio: 6.5:1
- Airfoil: NACA 64_{2}A-415 at root, 64_{1}A-612 at tip
- Empty weight: 1,330 kg (2,932 lb)
- Max takeoff weight: 2,700 kg (5,952 lb)
- Fuel capacity: 474 L (104 imp gal; 125 US gal) usable internal fuel,
  2x 240 L (53 imp gal; 63 US gal) external fuel drop tanks
  • Max landing weight: 2,565 kg
- Powerplant: 1 × Pratt & Whitney Canada PT6A-25A turboprop, 410 kW (550 hp)(derated from 485 kW (650 shp))
- Propellers: 3-bladed Hartzell HC-B3TN-2 / T10173C-8 constant-speed propeller, 2.36 m (7 ft 9 in) diameter

Performance

- Maximum speed: 412 km/h (256 mph, 222 kn) (max cruise at 6,095 m (19,997 ft))
- Cruise speed: 316 km/h (196 mph, 171 kn) (econ. cruise at 6,095 m (19,997 ft))
- Stall speed: 119 km/h (74 mph, 64 kn) (flaps and gear down, power off)
- Never exceed speed: 500 km/h (310 mph, 270 kn) EAS
- Range: 1,200 km (750 mi, 650 nmi) standard range without external drop tanks, ferry range with external drop tanks, (cruise power, at 5,000 m (16,000 ft) - 20 min reserves)
- Ferry range: 2,630 km (1,630 mi, 1,420 nmi)
- Endurance: 4 hr 22 min
- Service ceiling: 10,060 m (33,010 ft)
- g limits: -3 / +6
- Rate of climb: 10.9 m/s (2,150 ft/min) climb to 5,000 m in 9 min 0 sec
  take-off run 780 m at max take-off weight, landing run 505 m at max landing weight

Armament

- Hardpoints: 6 × underwing hardpoints for bombs and rockets with a capacity of 1,040 kg (2,294 lb)

== See also ==
Related development

- Pilatus P-3
- Pilatus PC-9

Aircraft of comparable role, configuration, and era

- Atlas ACE
- Beechcraft T-34 Mentor
- Embraer EMB 312 Tucano
- Grob G 120TP
- PZL-130 Orlik
- Socata TB 30 Epsilon
