= Central Flying School SAAF =

Central Flying School
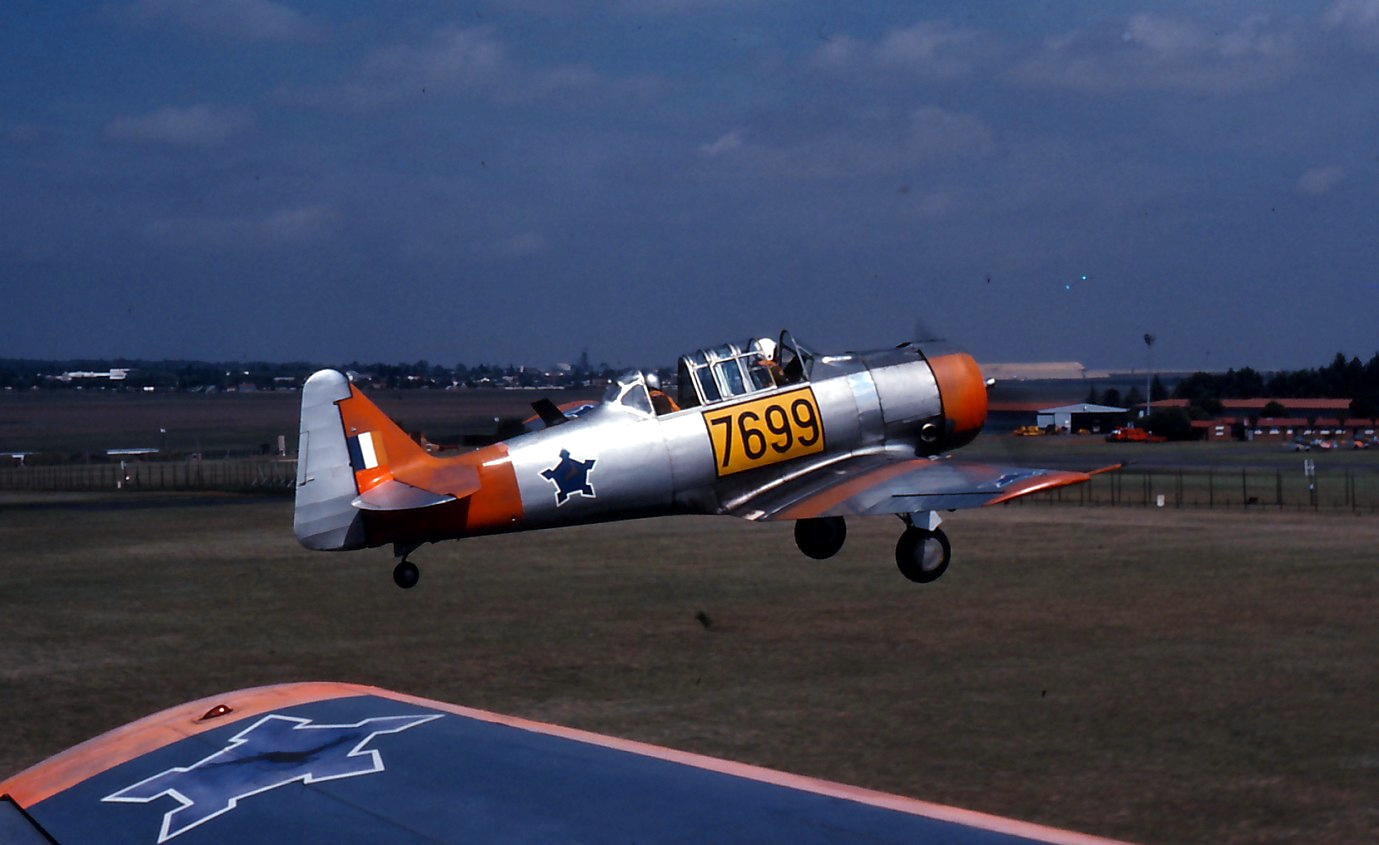
- A North American Harvard, the school's previously used aircraft.
- Active: 1932 - Present
- Country: (South Africa)
- Branch: South African Air Force
- Role: ab initio flight training school.
- Size: 20 Instructors, 50 Students per annum
- Current Base: AFB Langebaanweg, Langebaan
- Motto(s): Facta Nostra Vivent (Our Deeds Shall Live)
- Anniversaries: First formed: 1932 (at Zwartkop Air Station)
- Current Aircraft: Pilatus PC-7 MkII

Aircraft flown
- Bomber: Previously Flown: de Havilland DH.9
- Trainer: Previously Flown: North American Harvard; de Havilland Tiger Moth; Westland Wapiti III; Airspeed Oxford; Avro Avian IVM

The Central Flying School is a flight school of the South African Air Force. It is an ab initio flight training school. The unit was formed as the central point of flying training after closure of all Air Force flying schools in South Africa. The unit operates a fleet of 55 aircraft and qualifies approximately 50 students and 20 instructors per annum.
