= 15 Squadron SAAF =

15 Squadron
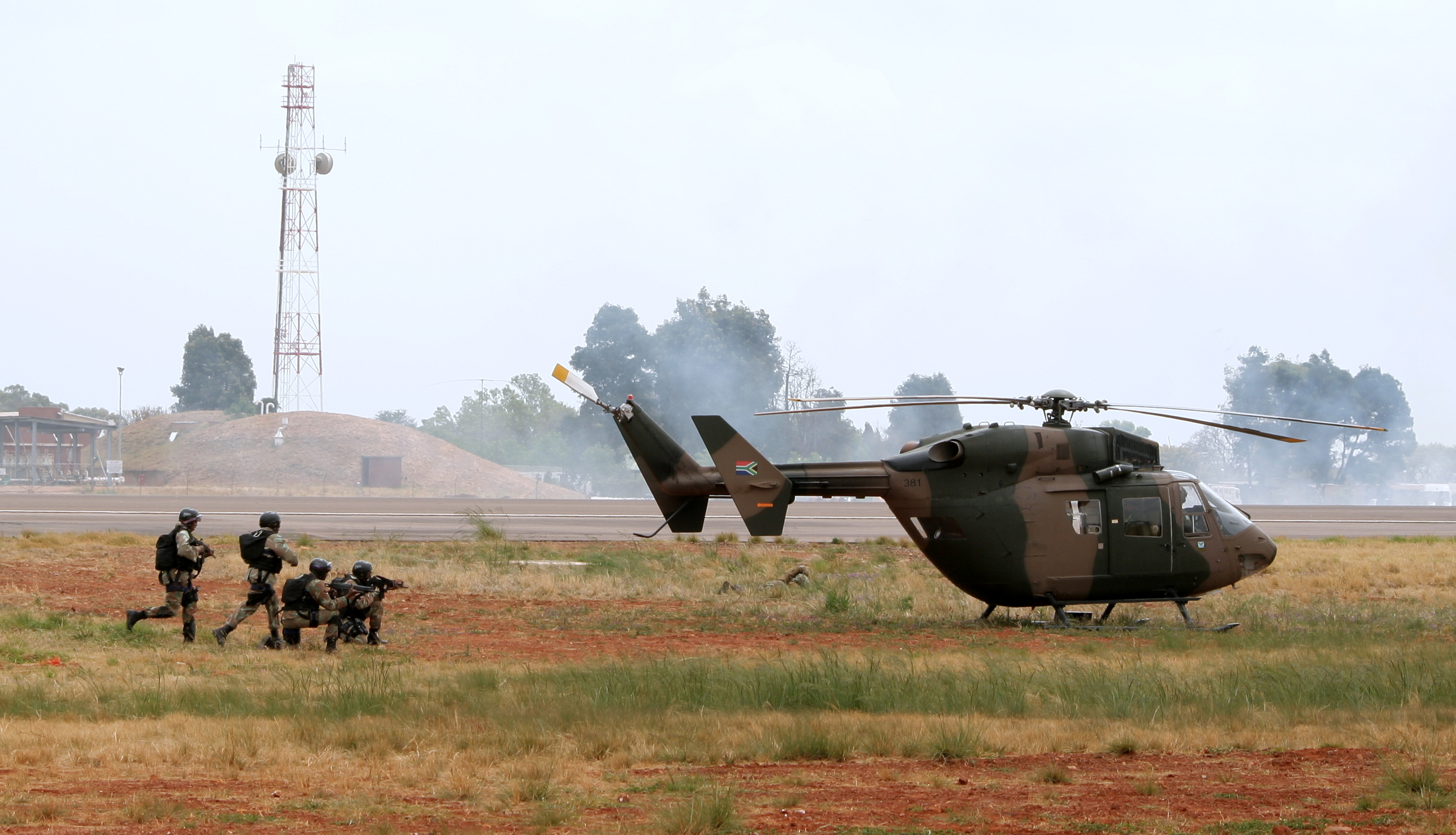
- BK 117 in 15 Squadron service
- Active: 1939–present
- Country: South Africa
- Branch: South African Air Force
- Role: Light Transport
- Garrison/HQ: AFB Durban
- Motto(s): "Aquila Petit Ardua" (The Eagle Seeks the Heights)
- Equipment: BK 117, Atlas Oryx

Insignia
- Squadron Identification Code: ZP (1943)
- 15 Squadron crest

15 Squadron SAAF is a squadron of the South African Air Force. It is currently a transport/utility helicopter squadron.

== History ==
The squadron was formed on 18 September 1939 as a SAAF Coastal Command squadron based at Cape Town. During the war it flew Junkers Ju-86, Bristol Blenheim and Martin Maryland aircraft. The squadron suffered a tragedy in May 1942, when eleven out of twelve personnel perished when three Blenheims encountered a sand storm and lost their bearings during a training flight and had to make an emergency landing in the desert.

The squadron flew Baltimore 5 Light Bombers in May 1945 as part of 253 Wing of the Mediterranean Allied Tactical Air Force. Notable Second World War members include Harry Schwarz, who in 1984 was made honorary colonel of the squadron.

== Post Second World War ==
Aircraft flown after the war included the Aérospatiale SA 321 Super Frelon and the Aérospatiale SA 330 Puma.

The current base is AFB Durban situated at the old Durban International Airport. It operates Atlas Oryx and MBB/Kawasaki BK 117 helicopters. Their primary role is maritime and landward search and rescue. Two flights of Oryx, A and B Flights, are based in Durban and C Flight, consisting of four BK 117s is detached to AFS Port Elizabeth.

The current BK 117 aircraft of C Flight were originally inherited from the Apartheid-era "homelands", the Ciskei having acquired 3 in 1983, Venda 2 in 1985, Transkei 2 in 1986 and Bophuthatswana 2 in 1987, making a total of 10 with an extra delivered from Brazil. Two of the aircraft have already been mothballed at AFB Bloemspruit. Four remain in service with 15 Squadron. C Flight's conversion to Agusta A109LUH helicopters has been postponed due to delays in developing emergency flotation equipment for the type, thus precluding its use in a maritime environment.

=== Attrition ===
- 2 November 1999: Bk117 384 rolled over after emergency landing
- March 2003: BK117 383 involved in an accident, later declared Cat 5 and cannibalised
- 20 August 2003: BK117 389 written-off during Exercise Blue Angel

== Roll of Honour ==
In respect of those recipients about whom it is available, the actions they were cited for follow below the table, since inclusion in the table itself is impractical.

Name	Rank	NS no.	Date of action	Unit	Service Arm
Selvan, Vasudevan (Note: Selvan, Vasudevan – Awarded for his action in saving the life of a SANDF Special Forces Officer during Operation FIBRE, while stationed in Bujumbura, Burundi.)	Sgt	001	20 Feb 2002	15 Sqn	SAAF
Pidsley, Douglas W. (Note: Pidsley, Douglas W. – DFC awarded for his actions in the sinking of the Prosperina which was Rommels last hope to resupply his forces wanting to push into Africa.)	Major	001	26 Oct 1942	15 Sqn	SAAF

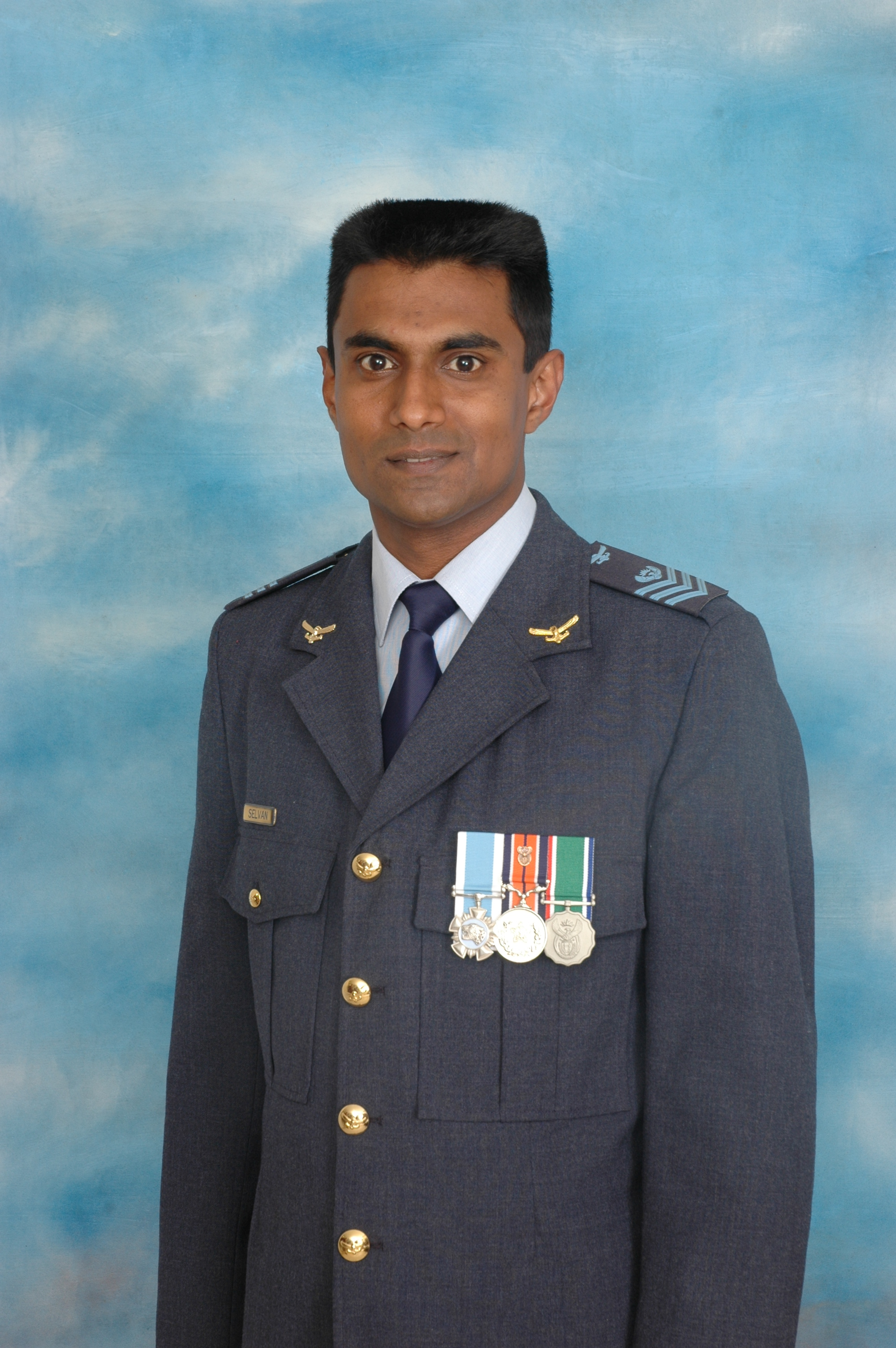
F Sgt Vasudevan Selvan NS
