= List of Beechcraft King Air operators =

More than 6,600 aircraft of the Beechcraft King Air line have been delivered and are operated by corporate, commercial, military and special mission operations in more than 94 countries. Almost 53% of the aircraft delivered have been from the Super King Air 200/300 series family.

== King Air ==
=== Military operators ===
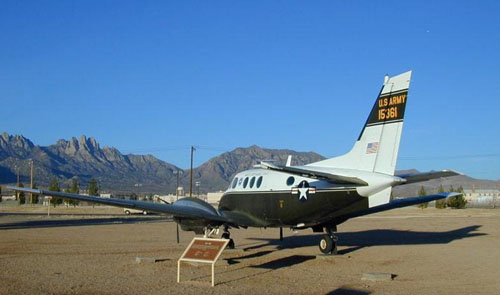
US Army VC-6A,(LJ-153), used by Wernher von Braun, displayed at White Sands Missile Range Museum

Algeria

- Algerian Air Force

Argentina

- Argentine Army Aviation - One King Air 100.

Barbados

- Barbados Defence Force

Bolivia

- Bolivian Air Force - One King Air 90, One King Air F90.
- Bolivian Army - One King Air 90.

Botswana

- Botswana Defence Force Air Wing - 1 King Air 200 as multi-engine trainer

Canada

- Canadian Forces Air Command / Royal Canadian Air Force

Since 2005 the KF Defence Programs (formerly Allied Wings) consortium has operated seven civil-registered C90B King Airs on behalf of the CAF/RCAF.

Chile

- Chilean Air Force

France

- French Air and Space Force

Greece

- Hellenic Army
- Hellenic Air Force

Indonesia

- Indonesian Air Force Two A100s as navigation trainers.

Israel

- Israeli Air Force - Small number of former United States Army RU-21s.

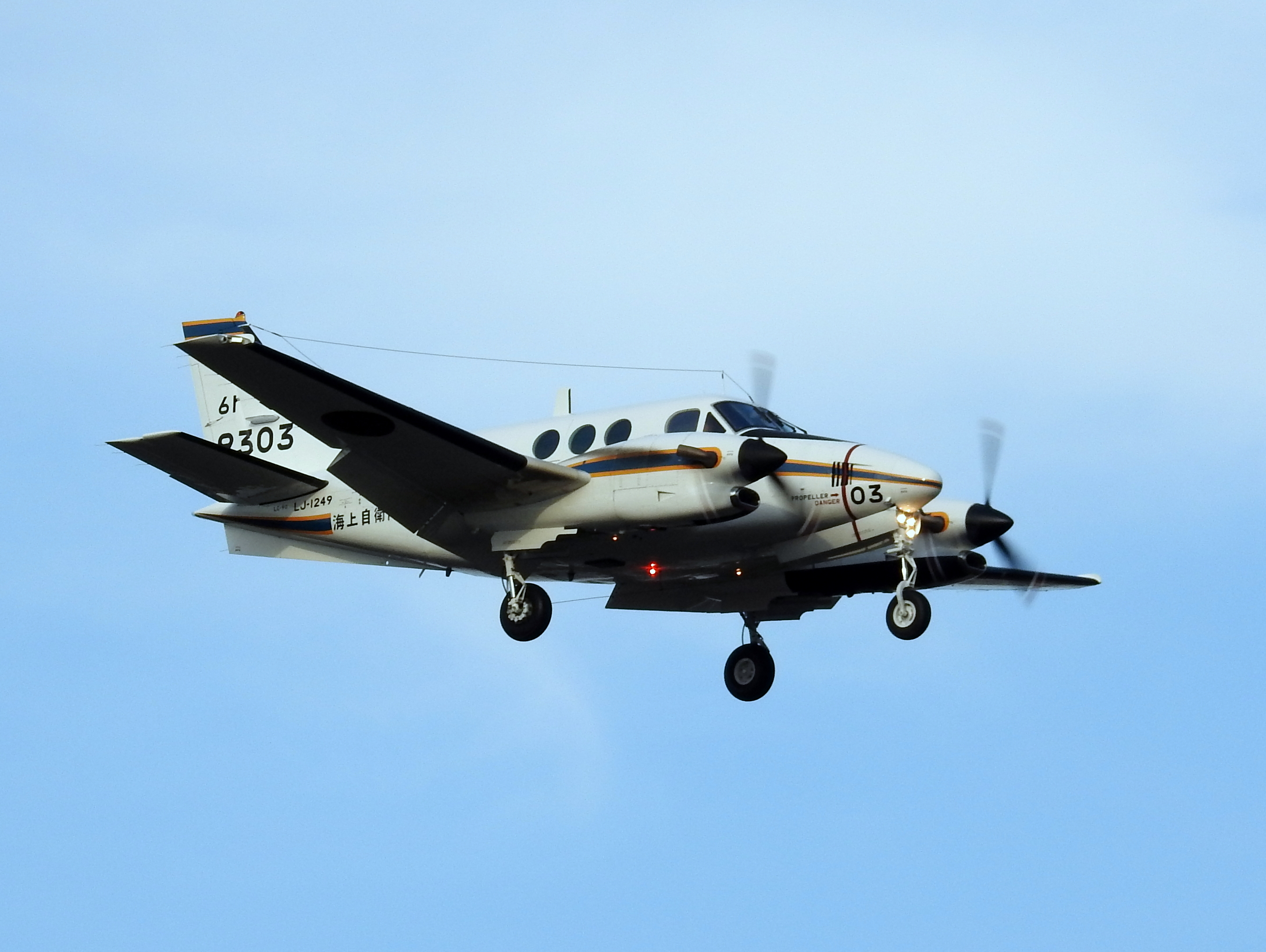
Japan Maritime Self-Defence Force LC-90

Jamaica

- Jamaica Defence Force - One King Air 100, and one King Air 350 WR.

Japan

- Japan Maritime Self Defense Force - 18 King Air C90s.
  - Air Transport Squadron 61 (1989-)
  - 202nd Naval Air Training Squadron (1973-)

Malta

- Air Wing of the Armed Forces of Malta - 3 Super King B200

Mexico

- Mexican Air Force - One King Air 90.

Morocco

- Royal Moroccan Air Force - Six King Air A100s.

Peru

- Peruvian Air Force - Three King Air C90s.

Philippines

- Philippine Navy (TC-90s leased from the Japan Maritime Self-Defense Force)

Spain

- Spanish Air and Space Force - Nine King Air C90s.

Thailand

- Royal Thai Air Force - at least one King Air E90.

United States

- United States Air Force
- United States Army
- United States Navy - 61 King Air H90s as T-44A pilot trainers.

Venezuela

- Venezuelan National Guard Air Detachment - One King Air E90.
- Venezuelan Navy - One King Air E90.

=== Government operators ===
Argentina

- Government of Province of Tierra del Fuego and Catamarca.

Canada

- Canadian Coast Guard
- Government of the Province of Alberta
- Government of the Province of New Brunswick
- Ontario Ministry of Natural Resources Aviation, Forest Fire and Emergency Services (2)
- Government of the Province of Saskatchewan

Chile

- Civil Aviation Administration (DGAC).

Colombia

- Colombian National Police
- Special Administrative Unit of Civil Aeronautics

Costa Rica

- Air Surveillance Service

United States

- CBP Air and Marine Operations
- USDA Forest Service
- Drug Enforcement Administration
- Federal Aviation Administration
- Governments of the states of Alaska, Arizona, Arkansas, Colorado, Florida, Georgia, Indiana, Michigan, Montana, New Mexico, New York, North Dakota, Ohio, Tennessee, and Texas
- NASA

=== Former civil operators ===
Australia

- Royal Flying Doctor Service - operated the C90.

== Super King Air ==
=== Civil operators ===
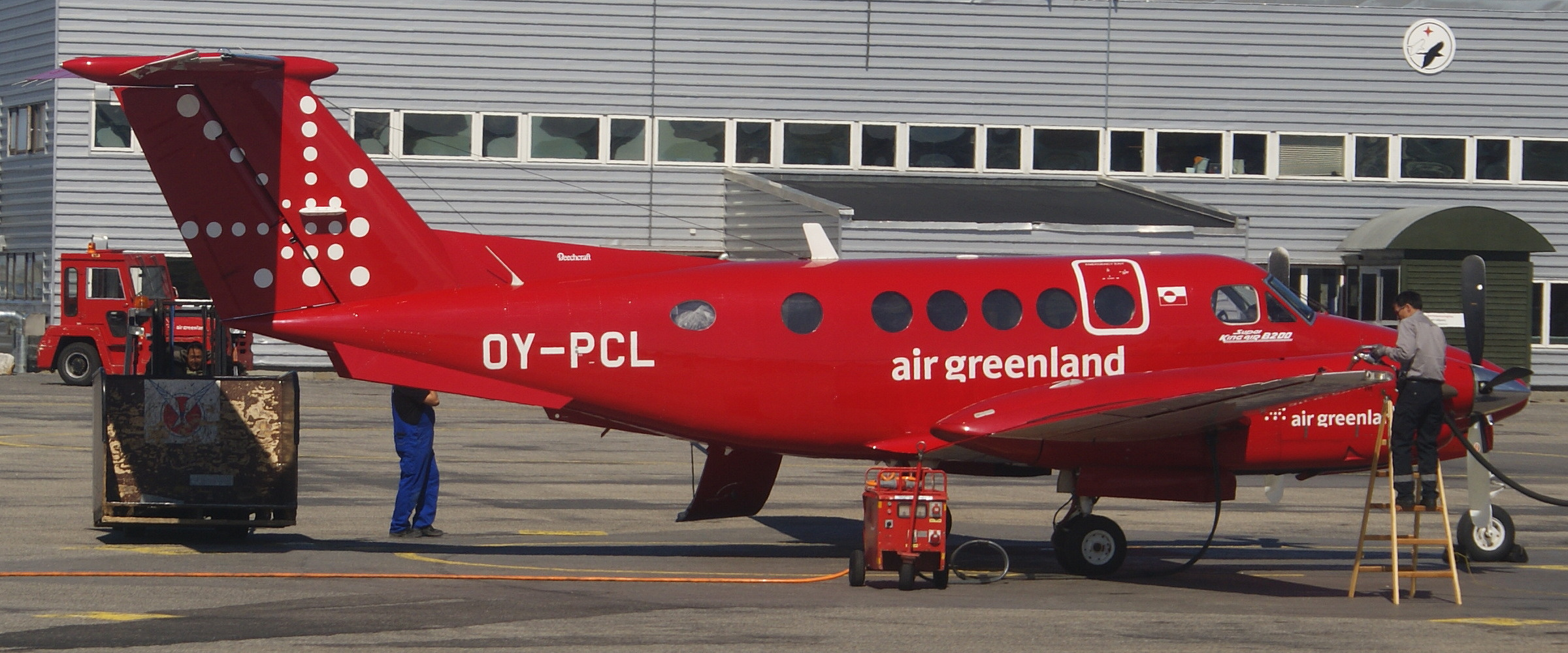
"Amaalik" of Air Greenland

The King Air is used by many corporate and private users, it is also popular as a light transport liaison aircraft with both government and non-government organizations. It is also used by air-taxi and air charter companies.

Australia

- Royal Flying Doctor Service - operates a fleet of 16 B200s, 10 B200Cs, one B200GT, two B300Cs and four B350Cs.

Canada

- Carson Air Ltd. - currently operates a fleet of eight B350s. All aircraft are flown under contract for the British Columbia Emergency Health Services. They currently have 13 B360HWC aircraft on order.

Iceland

- Norlandair - currently operates a fleet of three B200s. Norlandair services practically all medical flights in Iceland.

Oman

- Oman Air - Previously operated the Beechcraft Super King Air only 1 operated by the Government Of Oman.

Sweden

- Jonair - Operates a Beechcraft Super King Air 200.

=== Military operators ===
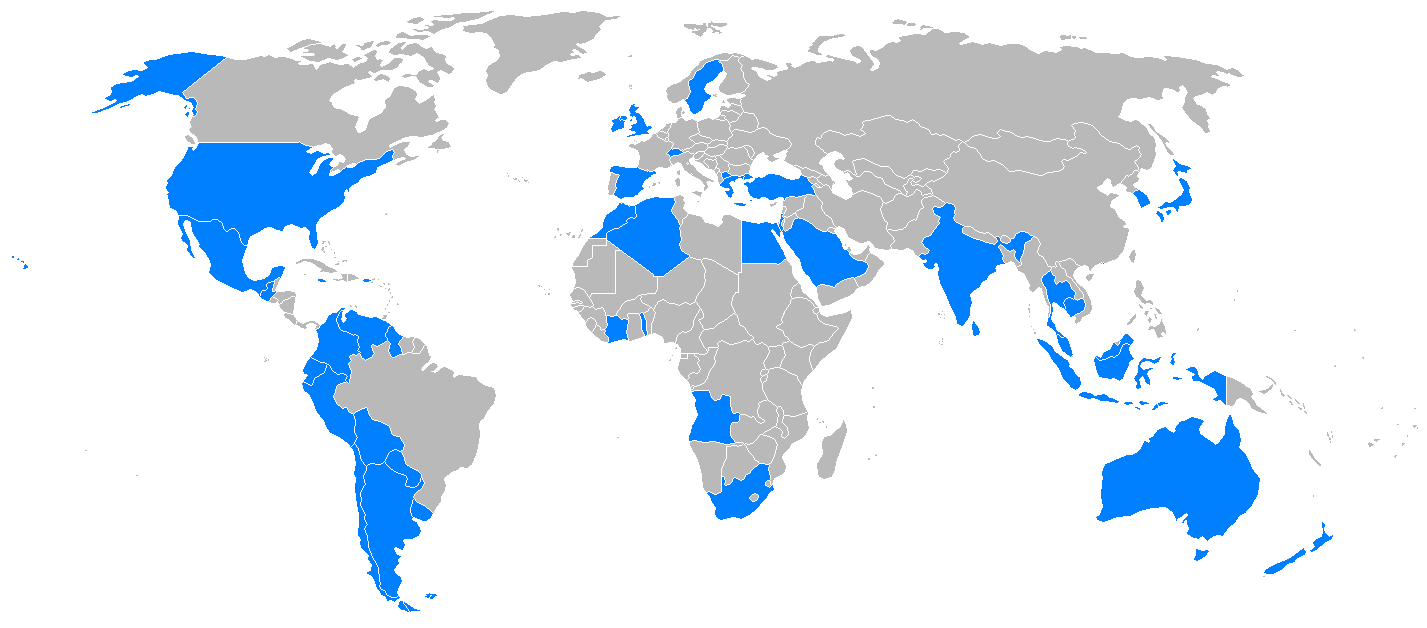
Military King Air operators (blue)

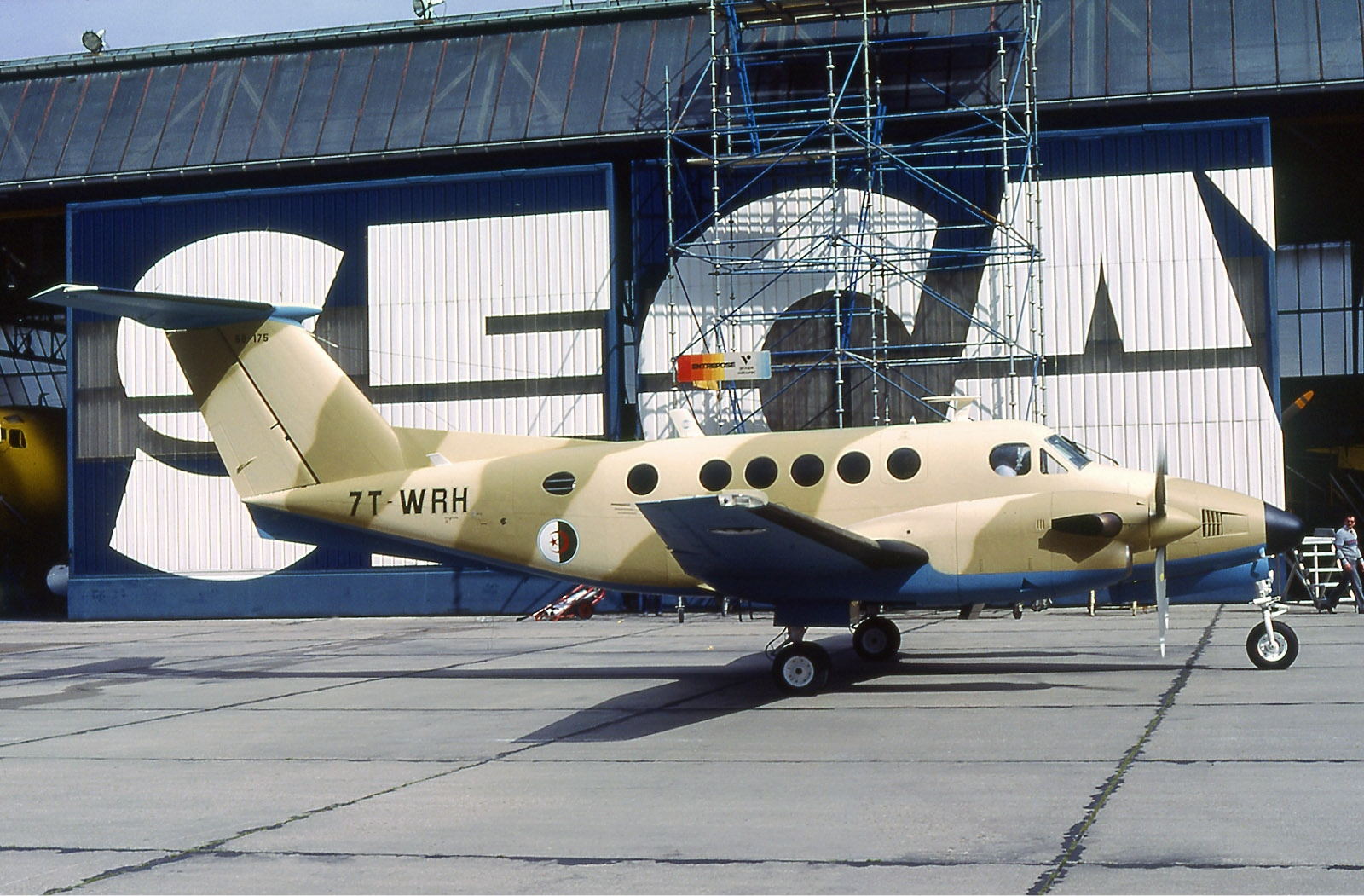
Algerian Air Force B200 in 1983

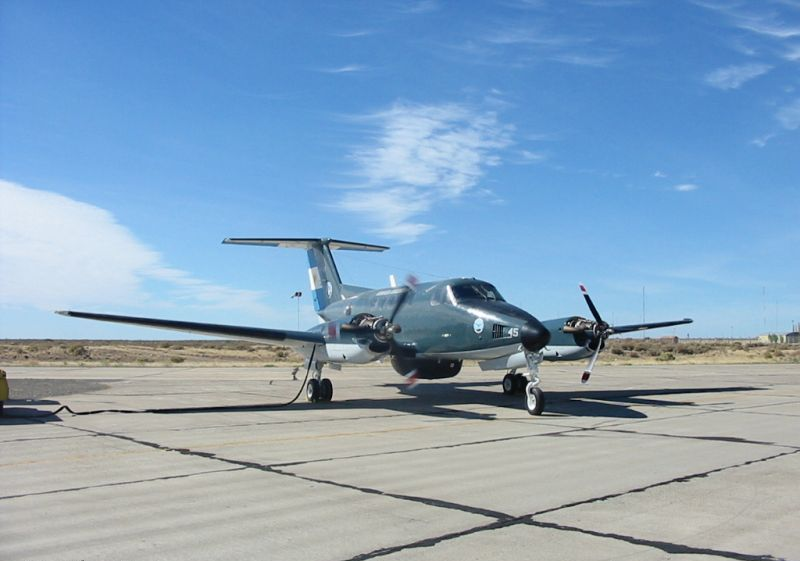
Argentine Naval Aviation Cormoran

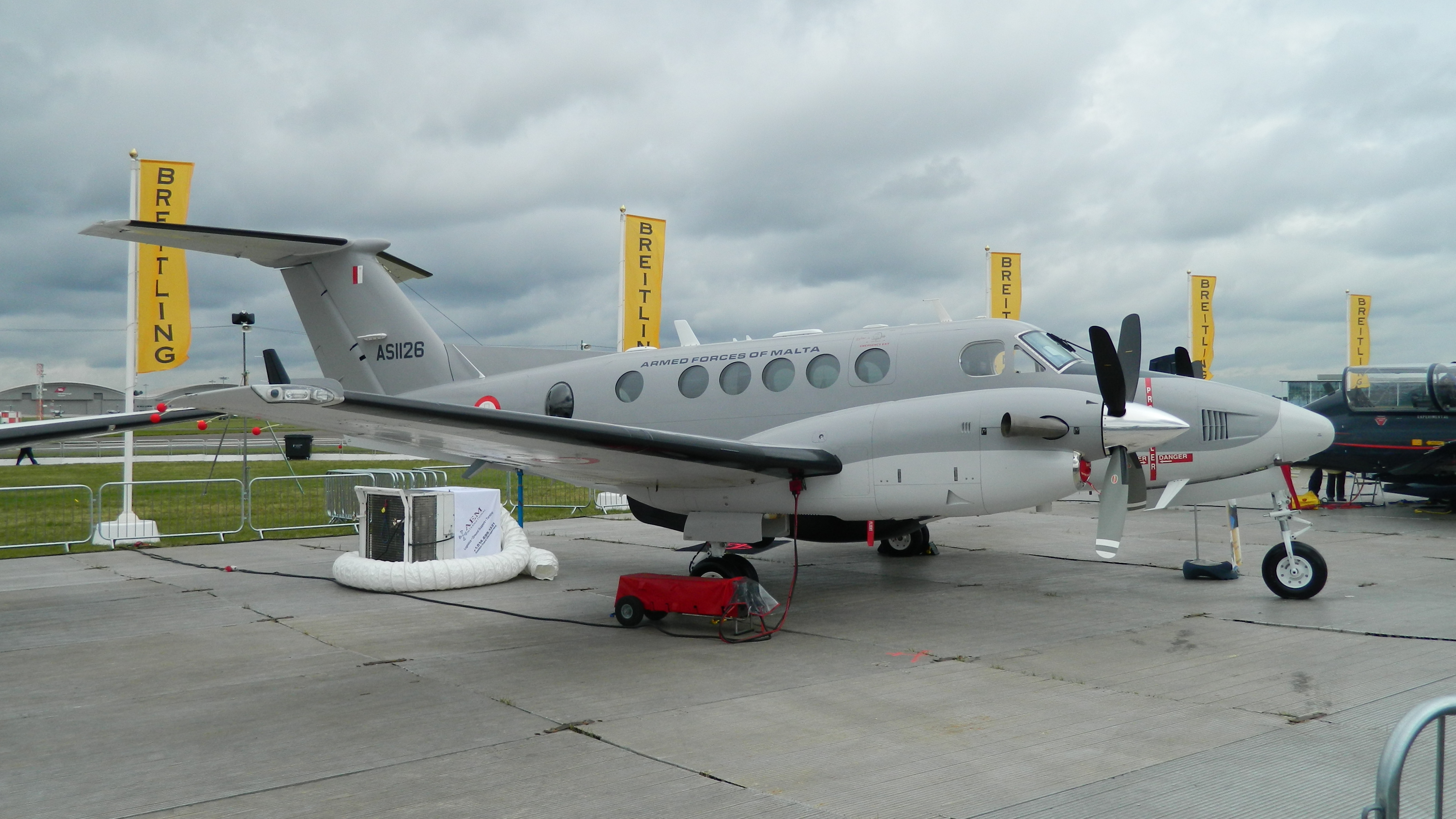
Armed Forces of Malta B200 in 2012

Algeria

- Algerian Air Force

Angola

- People's Air and Air Defence Force of Angola

Argentina

- Argentine Naval Aviation
- Argentine Naval Prefecture

Australia

- Royal Australian Air Force
  - RAAF Base East Sale, Victoria
    - No. 32 Squadron (1997–present)
  - RAAF Base Townsville, Queensland
    - No. 38 Squadron (2009–2018)

Bolivia

- Bolivian Air Force

Botswana

- Botswana Air Force

Burkina Faso

- Burkina Faso Air Force

Cambodia

- Royal Cambodian Air Force operated a single Super King Air in 2001.

Canada

- Royal Canadian Air Force - Three King Air 350ERs are operated in the ISTAR role in support of CANSOFCOM.

Colombia

- Colombian Aerospace Force
- Colombian Army
- Colombian Navy

Ecuador

- Ecuadorian Air Force
- Ecuadorian Army
- Ecuadorian Navy

Egypt

- Egyptian Air Force

Eritrea

- Eritrean Air Force

France

- French Air and Space Force - Two modified King Air 350s on order for surveillance duties. Delivery planned in 2019.

Greece

- Hellenic Army

Guatemala

- Guatemalan Air Force

Honduras

- Honduran Air Force

India

- Border Security Force
- Aviation Research Centre

Indonesia

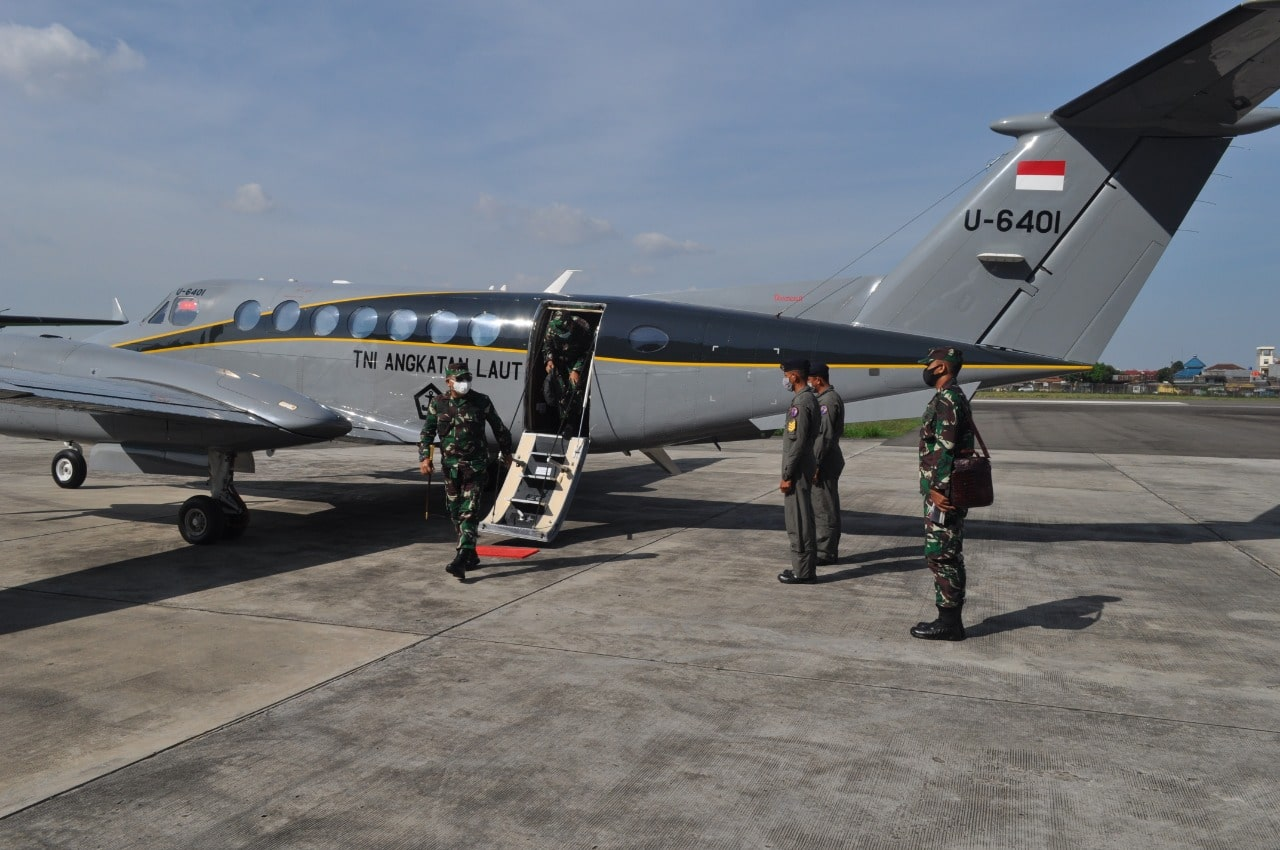
Indonesian Naval Aviation King Air 350i

- Indonesian Navy
  - Skuadron Udara 600 – Operated a single King Air 350i as VIP transport since 2017

Iraq

- Iraqi Air Force

Israel

- Israeli Air Force

Italy

- Italian Air Force - Two modified King Air 350ERs for SIGINT duties

Japan

- Japan Ground Self-Defense Force

Malaysia

- Royal Malaysian Air Force - 4 B200Ts and 2 350i fleet, 1 B200T crashed in 2016.

Malta

- Air Wing of the Armed Forces of Malta

Mexico

- Mexican Air Force

Morocco

- Royal Moroccan Air Force
- Royal Moroccan Navy - Two maritime surveillance King Air 350ER on order. Delivery due 2019.

New Zealand

- Royal New Zealand Air Force
  - RNZAF Base Ohakea, Manawatu
    - No. 42 Squadron (1998–present)

Niger

- Niger Air Force – one King Air 350 received in 2014.

Nigeria

- Nigerian Air Force

Pakistan

- Pakistan Air Force
- Pakistan Army

Paraguay

- Paraguayan Air Force – one King Air 350 purchased in 1991 as a presidential transport.
  - Base Aérea Silvio Pettirossi
    - Escuadrilla Presidencial (1991–1994)

Peru

- Peruvian Navy

Saudi Arabia

- Royal Saudi Air Force

South Africa

- South African Air Force
  - AFB Waterkloof, Gauteng
    - 21 Squadron (19??–1995)
    - 41 Squadron (1995–present)
  - AFB Ysterplaat, Western Cape
    - 35 Squadron (1990–1995)

Sri Lanka

- Sri Lanka Air Force
  - No. 3 Squadron (1986–present)

Switzerland

- Swiss Air Force

Thailand

- Royal Thai Army

Togo

- Togolese Air Force

Turkey

- Turkish Army

Uganda

- Uganda Air Force

United Arab Emirates

- United Arab Emirates Air Force

United Kingdom

- Royal Air Force
  - RAF Cranwell, Lincolnshire, England
    - No. 45 (Reserve) Squadron (2004–2018)
  - RAF Waddington, Lincolnshire, England
    - No. V (AC) Squadron (2009–2011)
    - No. 14 Squadron (2011–present)
- Royal Navy – Fleet Air Arm
  - RNAS Culdrose, Cornwall, England
    - 750 Naval Air Squadron (2011–present)

United States

- United States Air Force
- United States Army
- United States Marine Corps
- United States Navy
- Rectrix Aviation

Uruguay

- Uruguayan Navy

Venezuela

- Venezuelan Air Force
- Venezuelan Army

Yemen

- Yemeni Air Force

=== Government operators ===
Australia

- Ambulance Victoria - four B200s provided by Pel-Air Aviation.
- Victoria Police - one 350ER in service provided by Skytraders.

France

- Sécurité Civile - three B200 used for liaisons duties and C2.

India

- Government of Uttar Pradesh - Operates a King Air B200 (VT-UPR) and a King Air B200GT (VT-UPJ) from 2015. The government also used to operate a King Air 300 between 1994–2015.

Indonesia

- Indonesian Maritime Security Agency - Leased from various small airlines.

Malaysia

- Royal Malaysian Police - 5 in service

United Kingdom

- Maritime and Coastguard Agency - two B200s equipped with radar and electro-optical sensors for the maritime surveillance duties, provided by 2Excel Aviation.

United States

- The Commonwealth of Pennsylvania, Pennsylvania State Police - one King Air 360ER and Pennsylvania Department of Transportation uses one 350i used primarily for transport of the Governor and Lieutenant Governor

=== Former operators ===
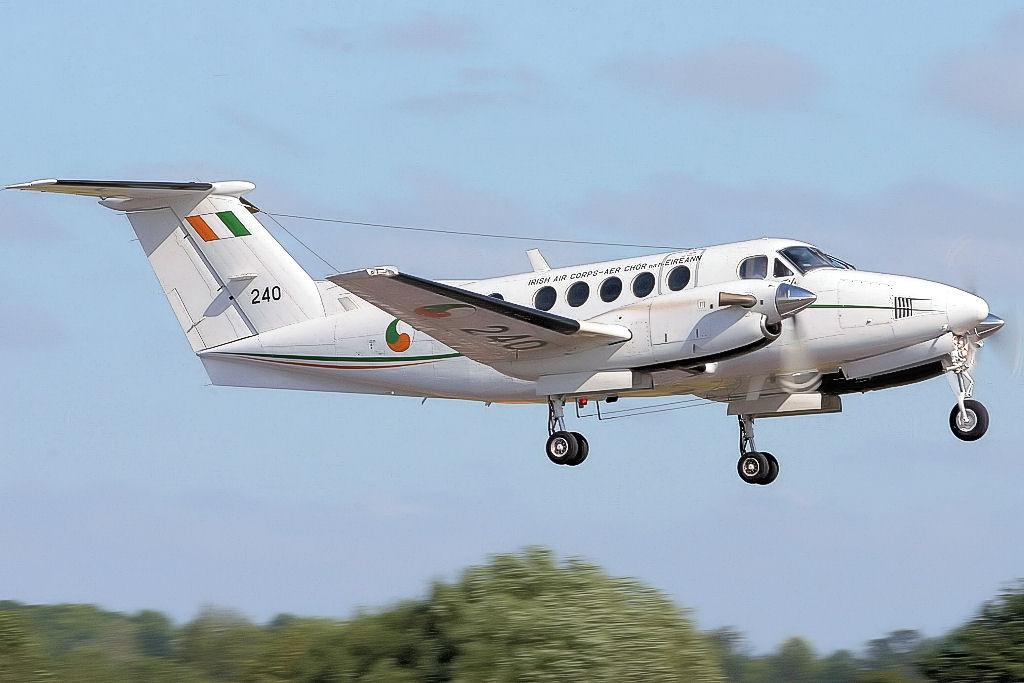
Irish Air Corps B200 in 2006

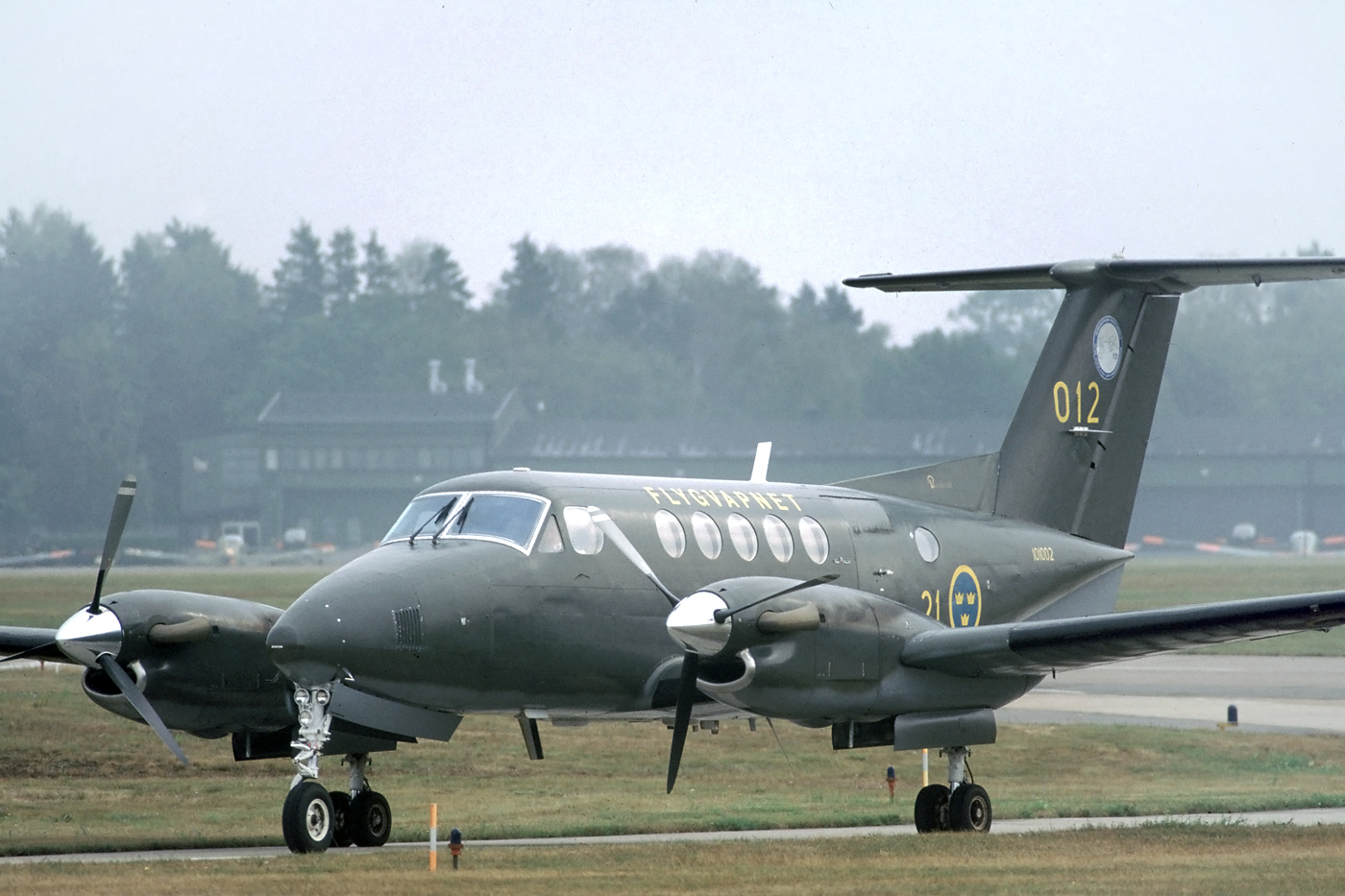
Swedish Air Force B200 in 1996

Bahamas

- Royal Bahamas Defence Force

Chile

- Chilean Air Force An example passed on to Chile's Directorate for Civil Aviation in 2010.

Guyana

- Guyana Defence Force

Hong Kong

- Royal Hong Kong Auxiliary Air Force - two B200Cs

Ireland

- Irish Air Corps

Sweden

- Swedish Air Force
