= 21 Squadron SAAF =

21 Squadron
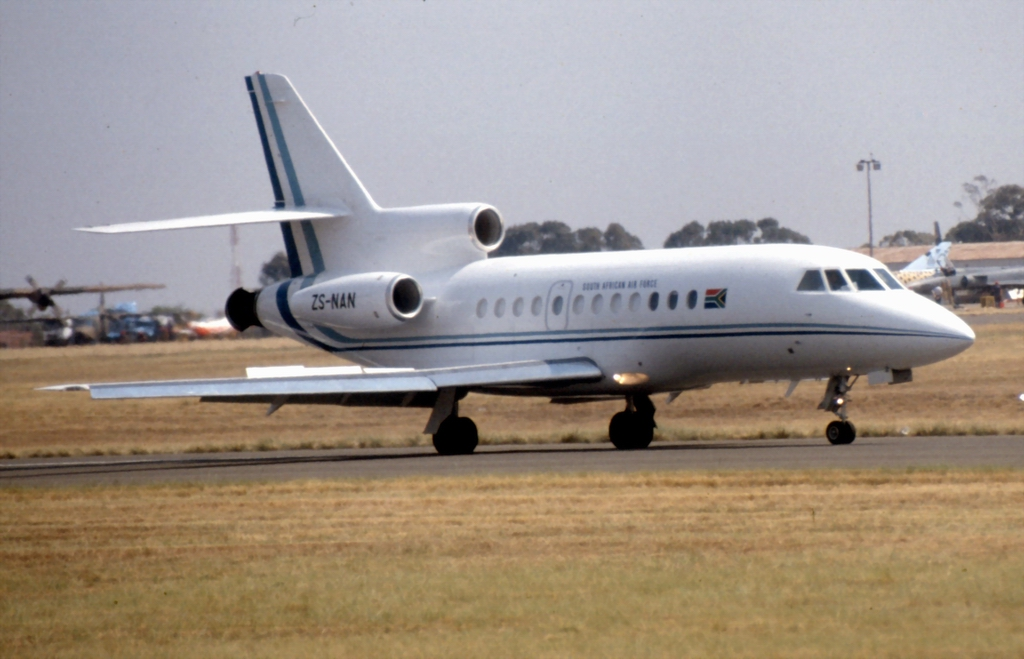
- Dassault Falcon 900A
- Active: 8 May 1941–present
- Country: South Africa
- Branch: South African Air Force
- Role: VIP Transport Squadron
- Garrison/HQ: AFB Waterkloof
- Motto: Onoorwinlik (Afrikaans) (Unconquerable)

Insignia
- Squadron Crest

Aircraft flown
- Bomber: A-22 Maryland, Martin Baltimore, Martin Marauder, Lockheed Ventura
- Transport: Dakota, Hawker Siddeley HS-125, Swearingen Merlin IVA, Beech King Air 200C.

21 Squadron SAAF is a squadron of the South African Air Force. It was formed as a bomber squadron in Kenya during World War II and became a VIP transport squadron in the 1960s, a role which it performs to this day. The squadron currently flies two Dassault Falcon 50s, two Cessna Citation IIs, a Dassault Falcon 900 and a Boeing BBJ aircraft. 21 Squadron is one of the most active squadrons in the air force with 606 VIP transport flights being made between 2009 and 2012. The Boeing BBJ is used as the presidential aircraft when the President of South Africa travels and designated callsign LMG1.

== History ==
=== World War II ===
21 Squadron SAAF was first formed on 8 May 1941 in Nakuru, Kenya, as a bomber squadron flying Martin Maryland medium bomber aircraft. The squadron consisted of pilots from Squadrons 11, 15, and 16 of the SAAF. From November 1943 to February 1944, the 21st Squadron was based at Totorella in the province of Foggia, Italy. Baltimore, Anson, and DC3 planes were flown on bombing raids mainly over central Italy and into Yugoslavia. On 21 February 1944 the squadron moved from Tortorella to Campomarino, south east of Termoli, where bombing continued, mainly of railways and marshalling yards. 21 Squadron SAAF was disbanded on 10 September 1945.

=== VIP Squadron ===
In 1968, the squadron was reformed at AFB Swartkop flying a Vickers Viscount and three Douglas Dakotas. The squadron acquired Hawker Siddeley HS-125 in 1970 and Swearingen Merlin in 1975. In 1985 the squadron moved to AFB Waterkloof. In 1983 the Viscount was transferred to 44 Squadron and the Merlins were sold in 1985. Two Beech KingAir 200Cs were acquired, but one was later sold and the other aircraft transferred to 41 Squadron. The HS-125s were disposed of in 1999. The squadron currently flies a fleet of jet aircraft. The two Dassault Falcon 50s were acquired in 1982 and 1985, the two Cessna 550 Citation IIs in 1983 and the Dassault Falcon 900 in 1992. In January 2003 the squadron received the new presidential Boeing BBJ.

The Boeing 737 BBJ is known as "Inkwazi", meaning "Fish eagle" in the isiXhosa and isiZulu languages. The aircraft is based on the Boeing 737-700 and has an upgraded interior. It arrived in South Africa on 21 October 2002.

== VIP flight usage ==
The following information was revealed when then Minister of Defence and Military Veterans Lindiwe Sisulu responded to a question posed by the Democratic Alliance's Sheik Shahid Esau in Parliament.

=== Number of flights made by politicians on 21 Squadron ===
==== Jacob Zuma ====
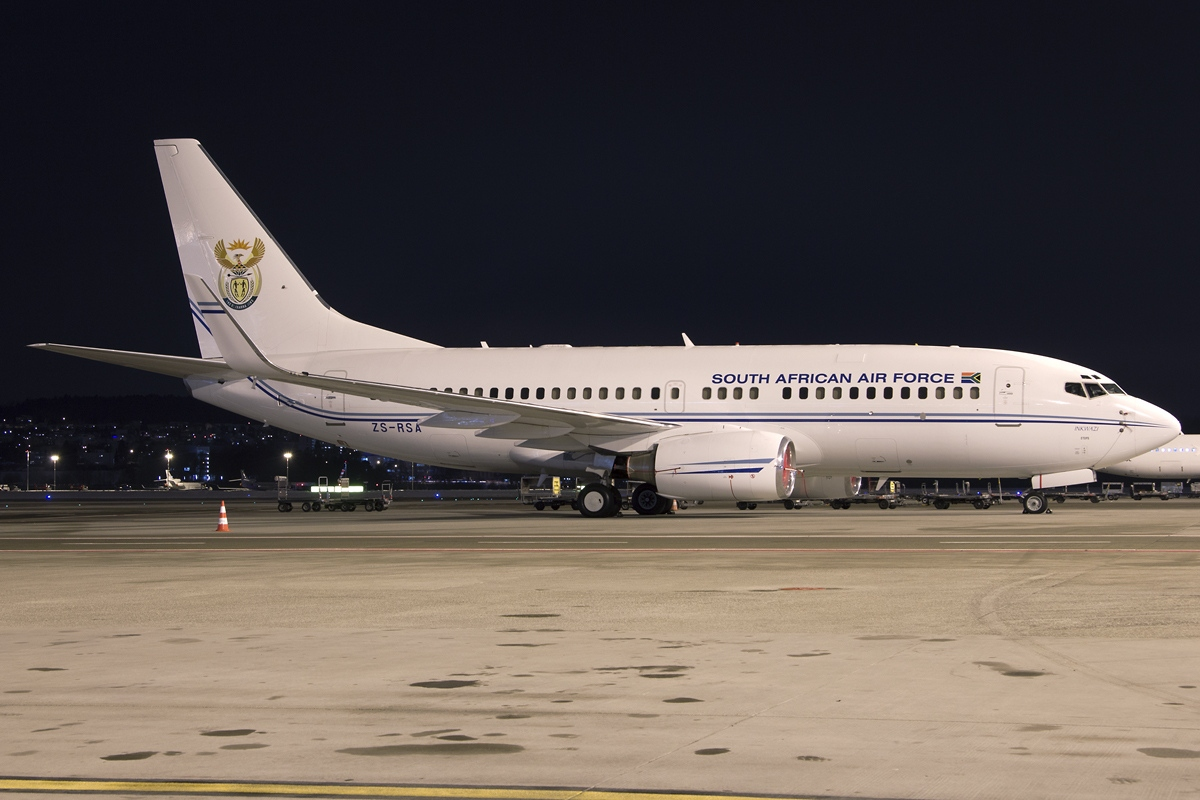
Boeing 737 BBJ "Inkwazi" at Zurich-Kloten Airport in Switzerland

Timeframe	No. of flights
2009/2010	72
2010/2011	84
2011/2012	72
1 April 2012/May 2012	6
Total	234

==== Kgalema Motlanthe ====
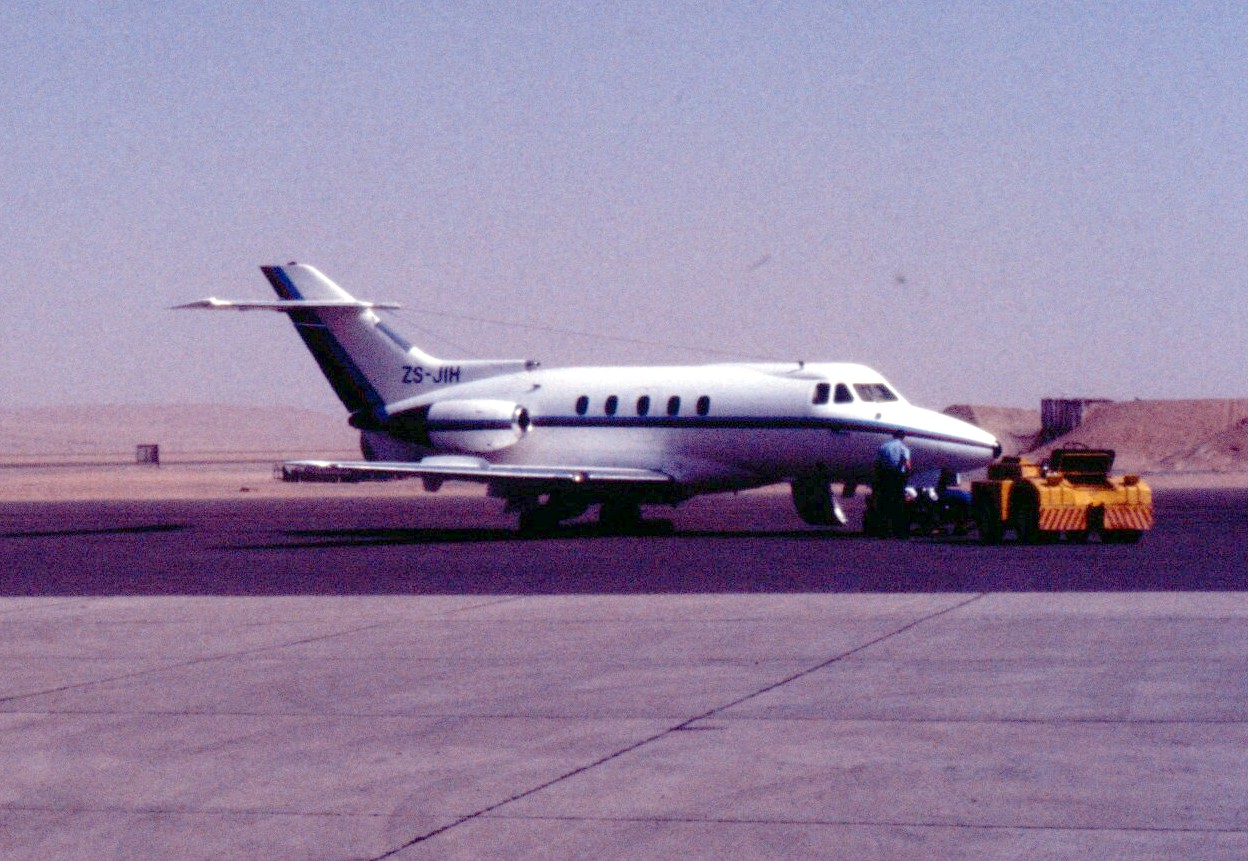
21 Squadron Hawker Siddeley HS-125

Timeframe	No. of flights
2009/2010	52
2010/2011	48
2011/2012	47
1 April 2012/May 2012	3
Total	150

==== Thabo Mbeki ====
Timeframe	No. of flights
2009/2010	2
2010/2011	3
Total	5

==== Lindiwe Sisulu ====
The following information was disclosed in response to another question posed to Sisulu by Advocate L H Max of the Democratic Alliance.

Timeframe	No. of flights
2009/2010	52
2010/2011	68
2011/2012	56
1 April 2012/May 2012	12
Total	188

All VIP flight information has since been made classified for security reasons.

=== Shadow aircraft incident ===
In 2012 it was found that two aircraft had followed Jacob Zuma's Boeing BBJ flight into John F. Kennedy International Airport. The aircraft were using SAAF call signs. The aircraft were a Bombardier Global Express and a South African Airways Airbus A340. In response to the reports, then Chief of the Air Force, Lieutenant General Carlo Gagiano said that the aircraft followed to ensure that the president could make it to an important meeting after his New York visit. The Democratic Alliance said that Sisulu should take responsibility and explain why the aircraft were used.

=== Acquisition of new aircraft ===
In 2012 plans were announced to acquire a new Boeing 777 VIP aircraft for the SAAF in a R2 billion deal. The order was cancelled after the offer had lapsed.

In 2015, Armscor opened the tender process for a new VIP aircraft for use by the president. Analysts speculated that an aircraft meeting Armscor's specifications could cost R4 billion.

== Accidents and incidents ==
- On 26 May 1971, during a practice flypast for the Republic Day celebrations (31 May), three HS-125s crashed into Devil's Peak. All on board were killed. The accident was attributed to low visibility due to bad weather conditions.
- In 2009, the aircraft carrying Deputy President Kgalema Motlanthe made an emergency landing in the Democratic Republic of the Congo as it was running low on fuel. There were no injuries.
- In 2011, the aircraft carrying Deputy President Kgalema Motlanthe made a precautionary landing in New Zealand due to a warning light activating, caused by a faulty sensor in the aircraft. Also in 2011, mechanical difficulties on an aircraft intended to be used by the Deputy President caused the planned official visits to Finland, Sweden and Denmark to be cancelled.

== See also ==
- Air transports of heads of state and government
