= Inkwazi =

Type of aircraft

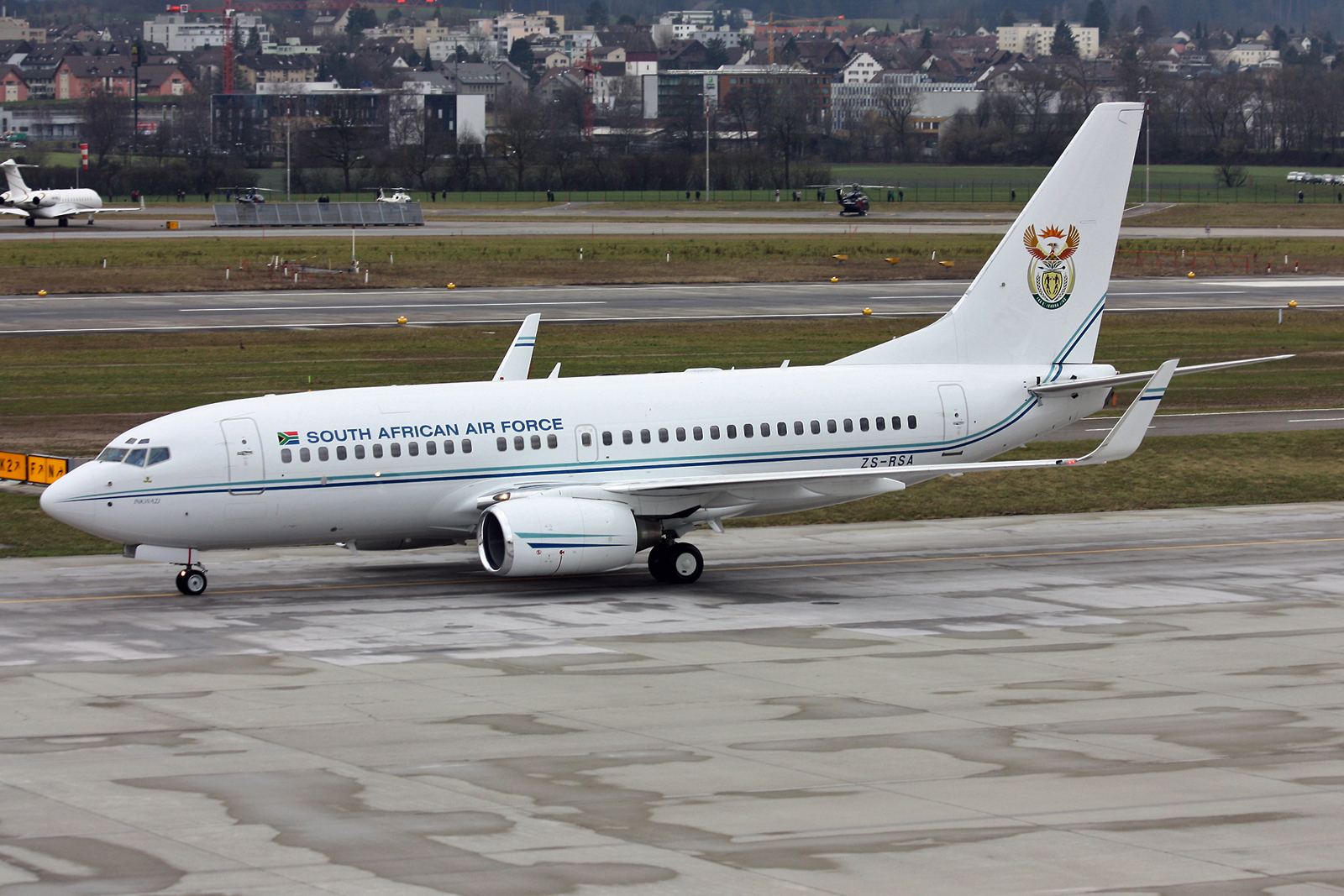
- Boeing 737-BBJ "Inkwazi" at Zurich-Kloten Airport in Switzerland

General information
- Type: Boeing Business Jet
- Manufacturer: Boeing
- Status: Operational with 21 Squadron SAAF
- Owners: South African Government
- Registration: ZS-RSA
- Radio code: LMG1

History
- In service: 2001 - Current

Inkwazi is a Boeing Business Jet (BBJ / Boeing 737) aircraft that serves as the primary mode of air transportation for the President of South Africa. Operated by 21 Squadron South African Air Force, the aircraft has a seating capacity for six ministers and ten additional passengers. It cost 300 million rand to acquire and another 108 million rand to fit and decorate the interior which can accommodate up to 15 passengers. The jet's name means "fish eagle" in Zulu.

== Replacement tender ==
In November 2015, Armscor issued a tender for the replacement of the Boeing 737 aircraft. The estimated cost of the new aircraft was between 2 billion and 4 billion rand. Some of the specific set of criteria included a range of 13,800 km, seating for 30 passengers, a conference room for 8, and a private bedroom and bathroom suite.

The potential replacements include:

- The Airbus A330
- The Airbus A340
- The Boeing 777
- The Boeing 787

However, in October 2016, Armscor announced, "none of the bids achieved a full score satisfactorily in the overall evaluation, thus prompting the cancellation of the tender." The company stated it would review the tender process and continue searching for a suitable replacement.

== Current arrangement ==
The current aircraft continues to be used for regional trips. However, when the ageing aircraft has been grounded for repairs, other private aircraft have been chartered. When an intercontinental aircraft with a range of 13,300 km is required, an aircraft has been leased from Fortune Air for almost 2 million rand a month. The aircraft returned to service as of 2018.

== See also ==
- 21 Squadron SAAF
- Air transports of heads of state and government
