= Air Force Base Waterkloof =

AFB Waterkloof
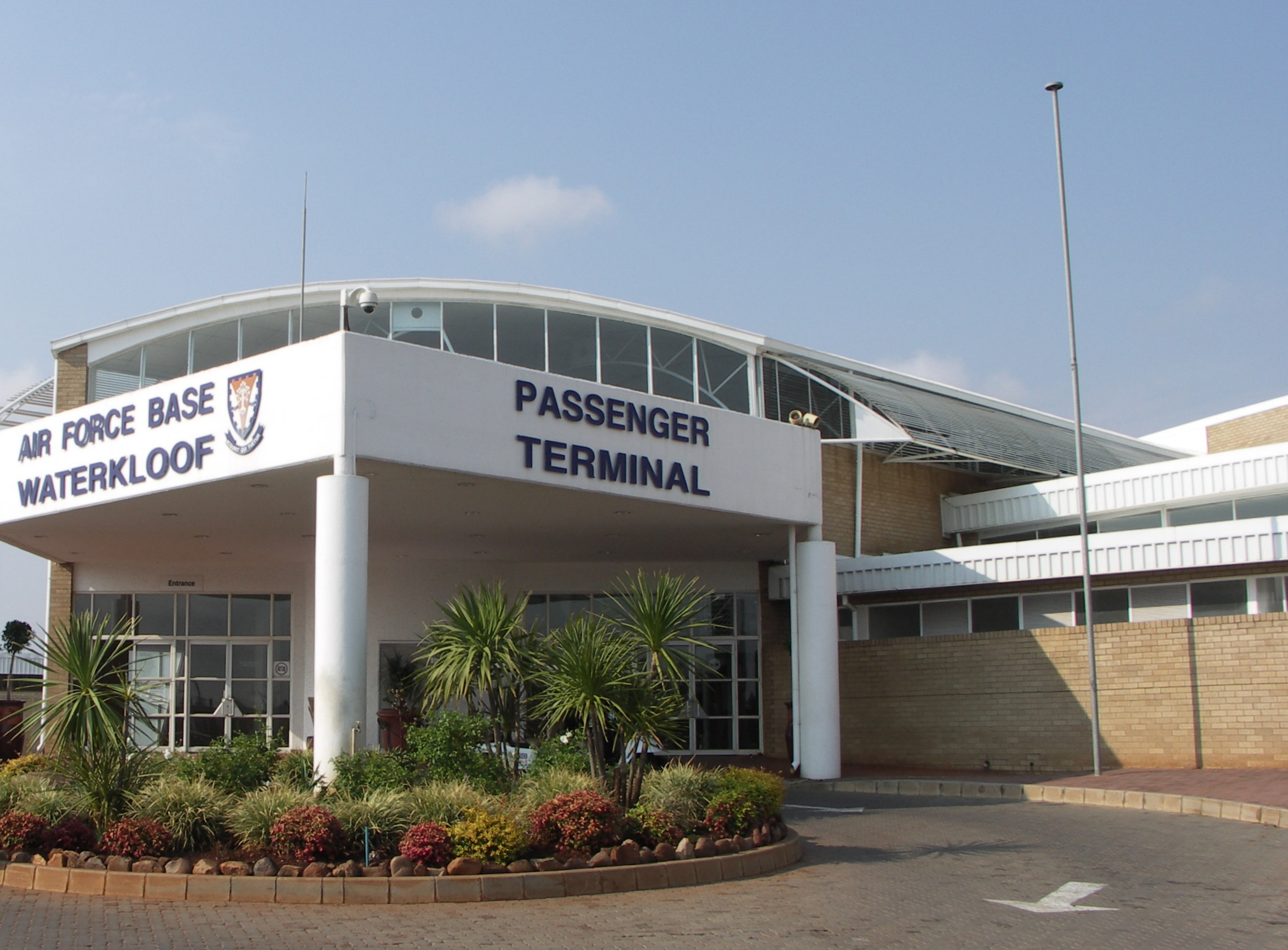
- AFB Waterkloof passenger terminal.

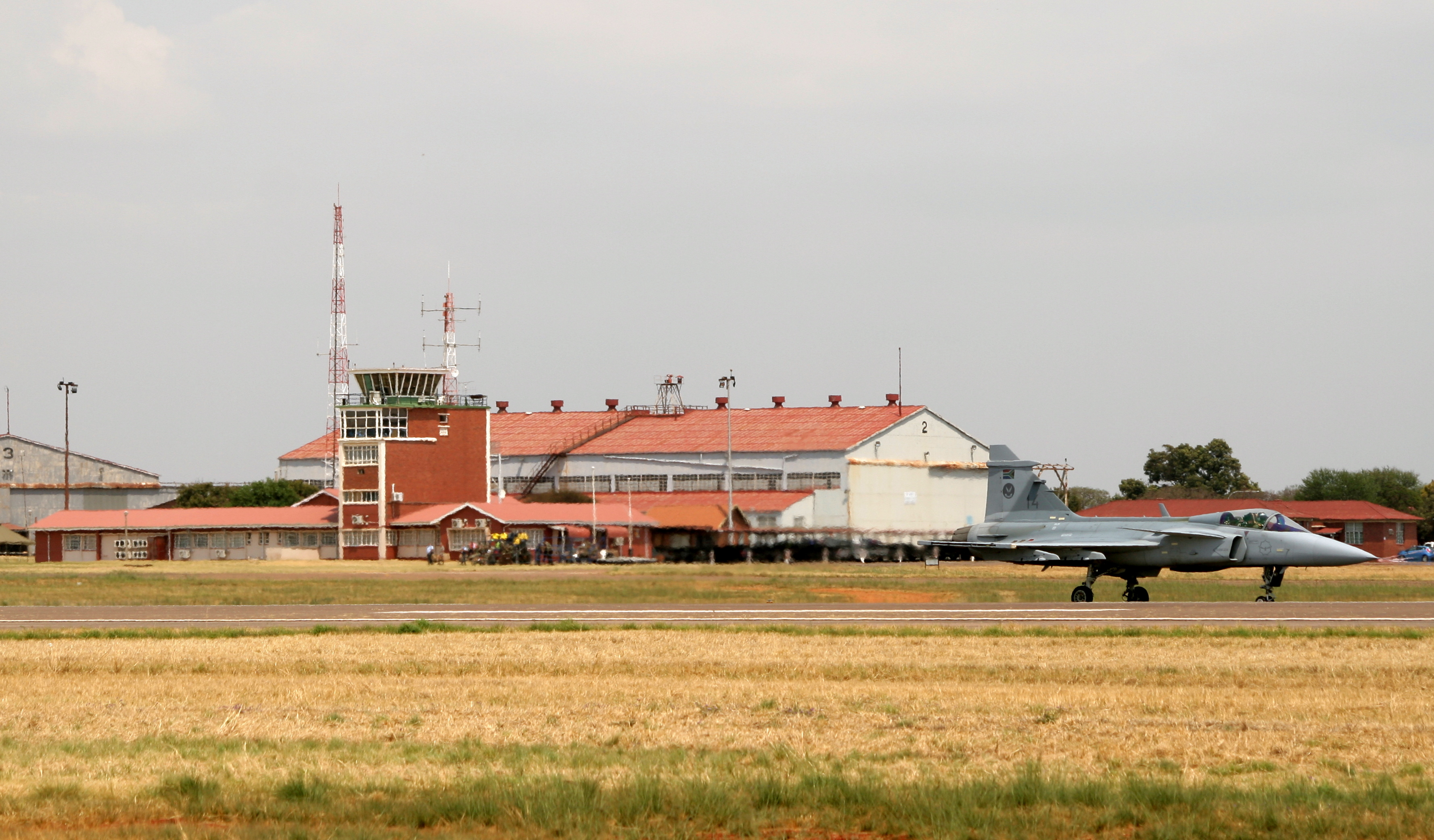
- Control tower at AFB Waterkloof with a South African Air Force Saab JAS 39 Gripen in the foreground.
- IATA: WKF; ICAO: FAWK

Summary
- Airport type: Military
- Operator: South African Air Force
- Location: Centurion, Tshwane, Gauteng, South Africa
- Elevation AMSL: 4,940 ft (1,510 m)
- Coordinates: 25°49′48″S 28°13′21″E
- Website: af.mil.za

Map
- Location in Gauteng FAWK (South Africa)

Runways
Direction	Length		Surface
Direction	ft	m	Surface
01/19	11,001	3,353	Asphalt
06/24	6,299	1,920	Asphalt

Air Force Base Waterkloof (AFB Wklf) is an airbase of the South African Air Force. It is situated on the outskirts of Pretoria, and is the SAAF's busiest airbase. The base's name means "water ravine" in Afrikaans. Despite the name, this base is not located in the suburban town of Waterkloof, Pretoria, but lies to the south of Pretoria, 4.34 nmi (8.04 km) to the northeast of Centurion, Gauteng and 3.37 nmi (6.24 km) from AFB Swartkop, at an elevation of 1506 metres (4940 ft).

The base motto is Acquirit Qui Tuetur (He Obtains Who Defends).

== Units currently hosted ==
- 21 Squadron – VIP transport
- 28 Squadron – Medium transport
- 41 Squadron – Light transport
- 44 Squadron – Light transport
- 111 Squadron – Light transport (reserve)
- 140 Squadron – Light transport (reserve)
- 504 Squadron – Security
- 5 Air Servicing Unit – Maintenance support
- Central Photographic Institute – Photographic services
- JARIC, (Joint Air Reconnaissance Intelligence Centre) The SANDF National Imagery Exploitation Centre – Strategic Imagery Intelligence (IMINT) support
- Mobile Deployment Wing – Emergency response
- SAAF Telecommunications Centre – Communications
- Ditholo Training Area is managed as an external component of AFB Waterkloof

== History ==
The base was officially opened on 1 August 1938 as Waterkloof Air Station. Since that time it has always been in the service of the SAAF. It was upgraded to Air Force Base during World War II.

== Aviation ==
- Non-directional beacon – WL315.0
- VHF omnidirectional range – WKV116.9
- Tower – 124.1

== Controversy ==
On 30 April 2013 a flight full of Indian citizens who had come to attend a wedding of the Gupta family landed at Waterkloof airbase. This was in contravention of South African law since the airbase is classified as a National Key Point; in theory not available to be used for personal air travel by unaffiliated private individuals. It was later alleged that former president Jacob Zuma is the one who ordered the flight to land. The incident would later earn the moniker "Guptagate" in the South African media.

In April 2023 the President of the United Arab Emirates, Sheikh Mohamed bin Zayed Al Nahyan, and his family landed at the base during their vacation to a South African game lodge in the Eastern Cape. This resulted in comparisons with the landing of Gupta family members at the base 10 years before whilst also closely following the unsuccessful extradition of the Guptas from custody in the UAE to face trail for corruption in South Africa.

In May 2023, a year after Russia's 2022 invasion of Ukraine, a US-sanctioned Russian transport plane landed at the airport carrying an unknown cargo. The landing further strained South African-United States relations by increasing American skepticism of South Africa's self-proclaimed neutral stance in the conflict.
