= 44 Squadron SAAF =

44 Squadron
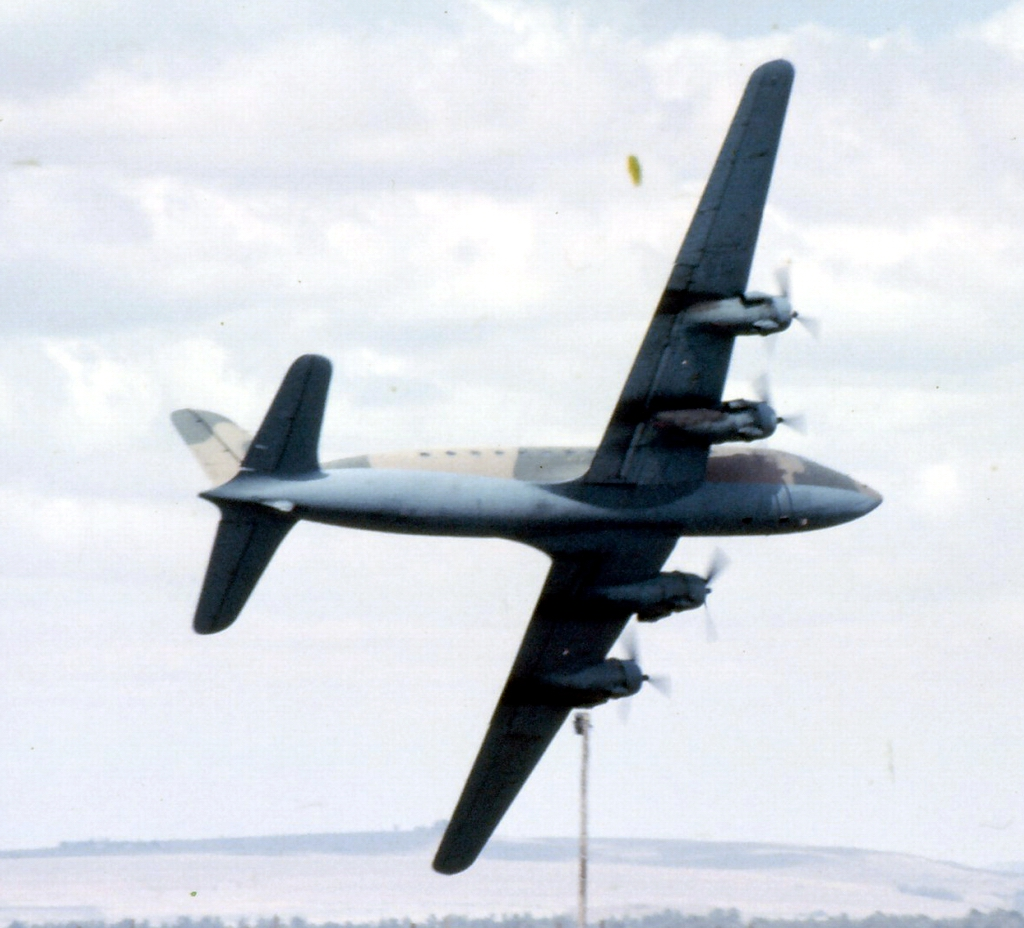
- DC-4 Skymaster as previously flown by 44 Sqn.
- Active: 12 March 1944–present
- Country: South Africa
- Branch: South African Air Force
- Role: Light Transport
- Current Base: AFB Waterkloof
- Motto(s): Prosumus We are useful
- Equipment: CASA C.212-200/-300

Insignia
- Squadron Crest

44 Squadron SAAF is a squadron of the South African Air Force. It is currently a light transport squadron.

- First formed: 12 March 1944 (at RAF Cairo West airfield, Egypt). The squadron flew Dakota DC3's as part of No. 216 Group RAF of the Mediterranean Allied Air Forces in May 1945
- Historic aircraft flown: Avro Anson, Dakota, Douglas DC-4, C-47TP
- Made a huge contribution during the border war, where members of 44 Squadron which was based at Air Force Base Swartkop in Pretoria fulfilled their duties at Air Force Base Ondangwa in South West Africa by flying rum-runs to border bases, transporting equipment, troops, visitors, paratrooping, flying patrols at night and many more. The Squadron at Ondangwa also flew the ambulance Dakota and the 20mm gunship named 'Dragon".
- 44 Squadron at Air Force Base Swartkop mainly flew three aircraft, DC4 Skymaster, DC3 Dakota and Viscount.

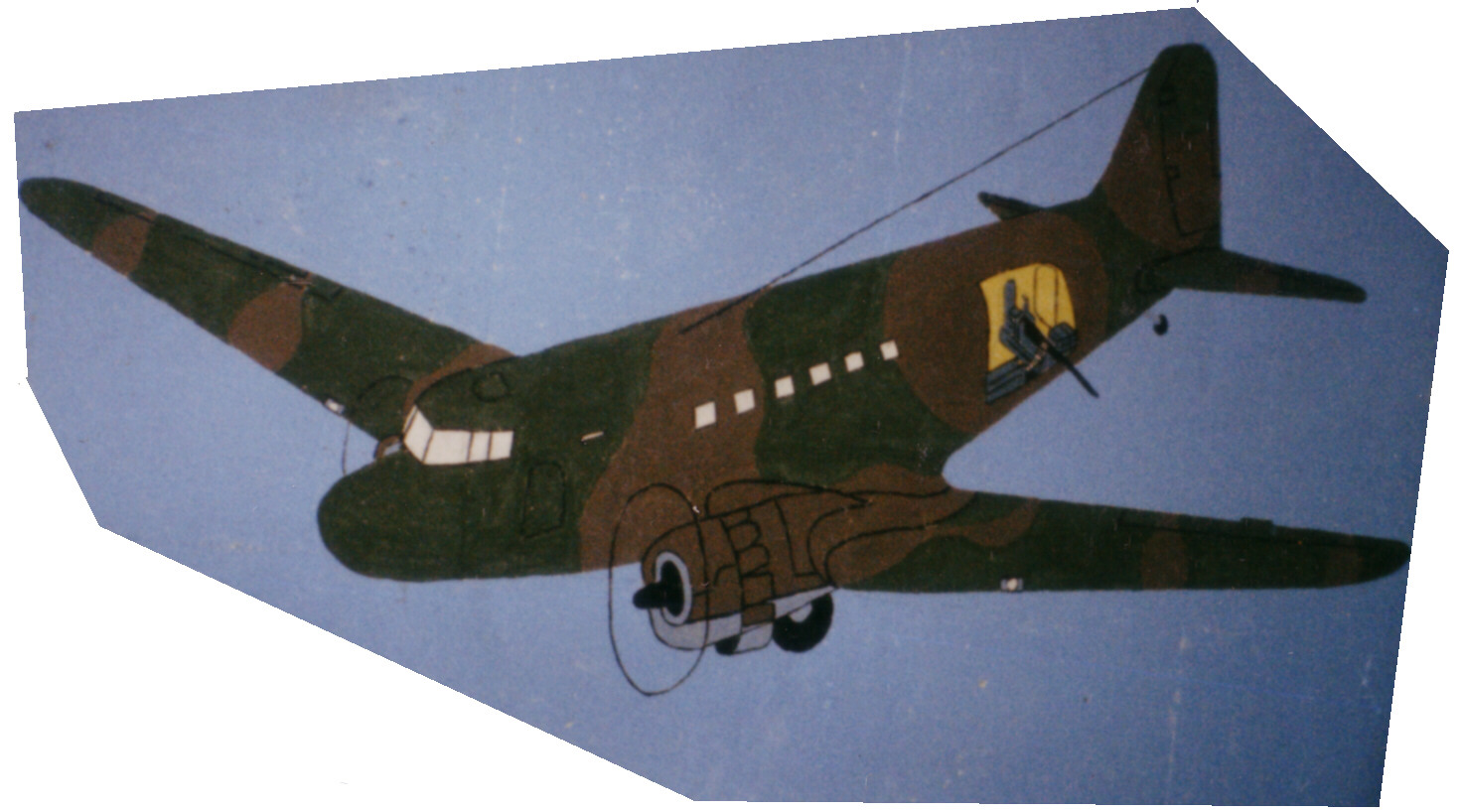
Dakota gunship drawn on the wall at the sleeping quarters at AFB Ondangwa by sergeant George Avis.

== See also ==
- No. 44 (Rhodesia) Squadron RAF
