= 202nd Naval Air Training Squadron (JMSDF) =

202nd Naval Air Training Sqn
- 第202教育航空隊
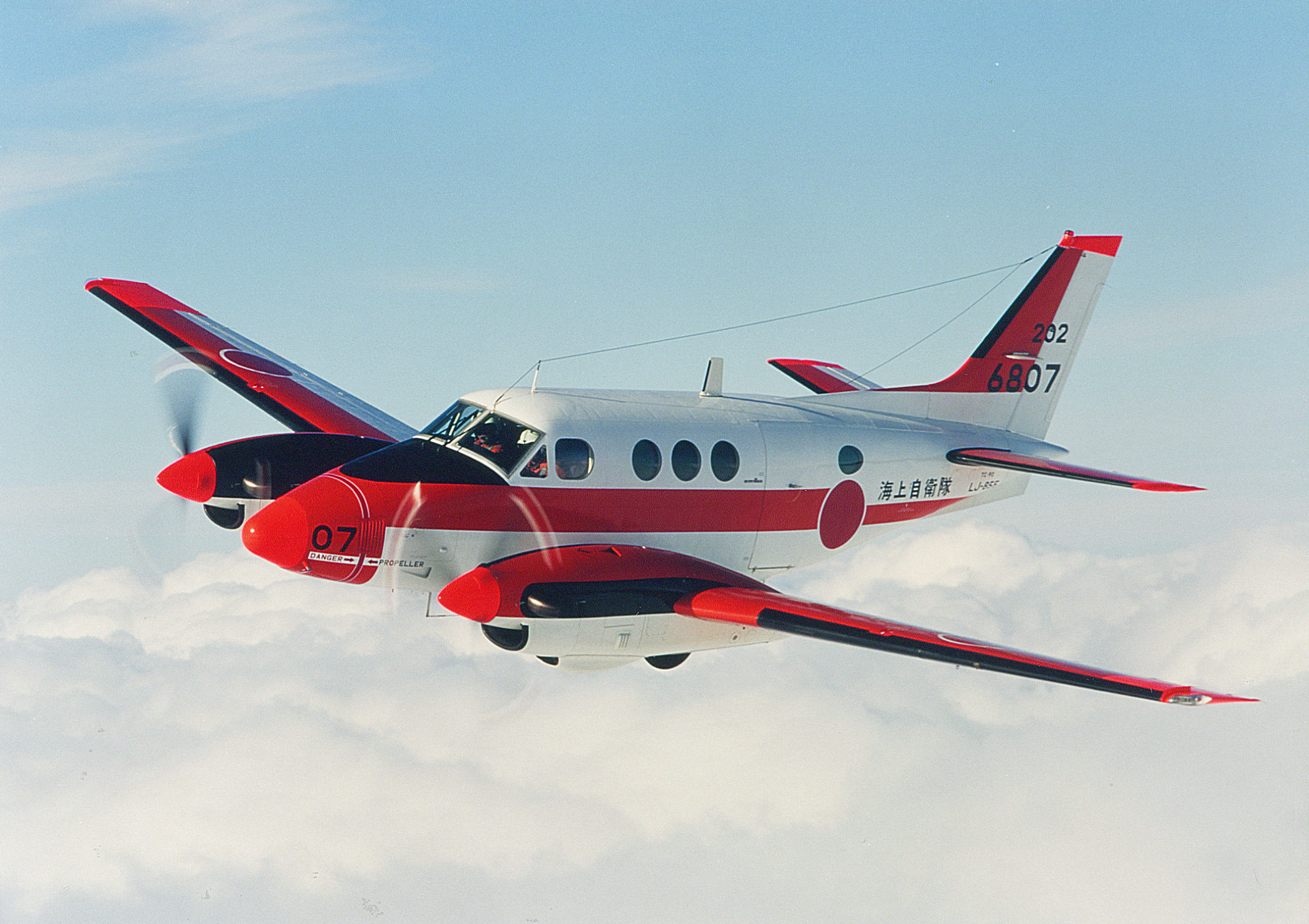
- TC-90 of 202nd Squadron
- Active: 1 March 1973
- Country: Japan
- Branch: Japan Maritime Self-Defense Force
- Part of: Air Training Group Tokushima, Air Training Command, Fleet Air Force
- Garrison/HQ: Tokushima Air Base

Aircraft flown
- Transport: TC-90

202nd Naval Air Training Squadron (第202教育航空隊, dai-202-kyouikukoukuutai) is a unit in the Japanese Maritime Self-Defence Force. It is a part of the Fleet Air Force and is based at the Tokushima Air Base in Tokushima prefecture. It operates the TC-90 aircraft.

== History ==
Five TC-90 aircraft of the squadron were leased to the Philippines for conducting naval patrols. The first two departed Japan on March 23, 2017. The squadron has also been conducting training for two Filipino naval pilots. The aircraft are assigned to Naval Aviation Squadron MF-30 of the Naval Air Group of the Philippine Navy.
