= 41 Squadron SAAF =

41 Squadron
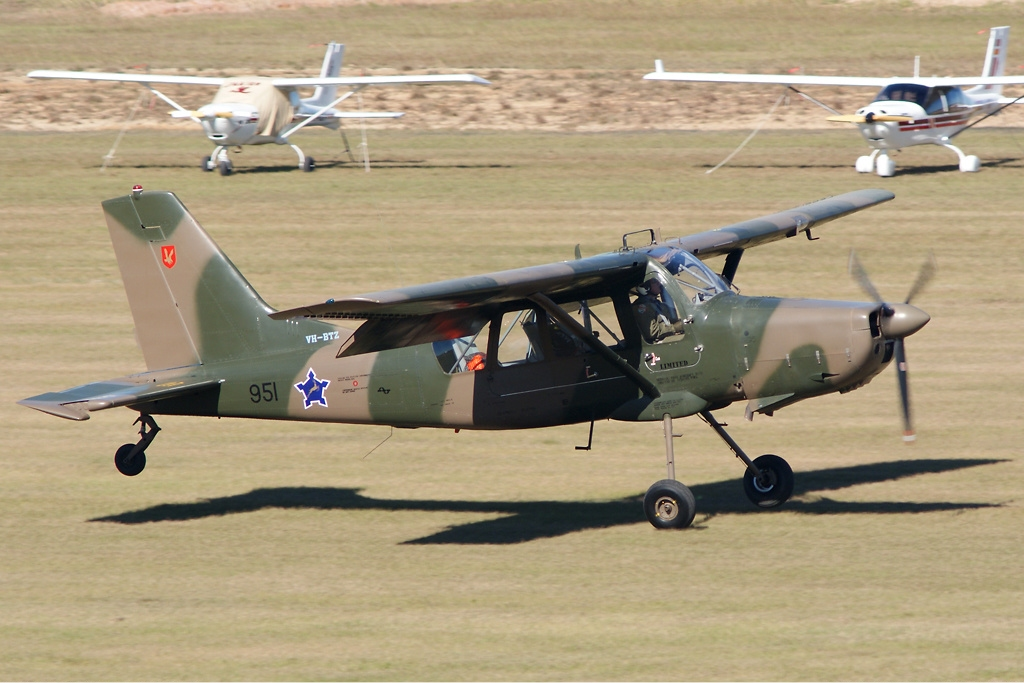
- Aermacchi AM3 Bosbok as previously flown by 41 Sqn
- Active: 16 October 1940 – 30 November 1944; January 1963–present
- Country: South Africa
- Branch: South African Air Force
- Role: Light Transport
- Current Base: AFB Waterkloof
- Motto(s): Detegimus Hostes; We Find the Enemy

Insignia
- Squadron Insignia

41 Squadron is a light transport squadron of the South African Air Force. It was formed in 1940, it is currently based at AFB Waterkloof.

== History ==
=== World War II ===
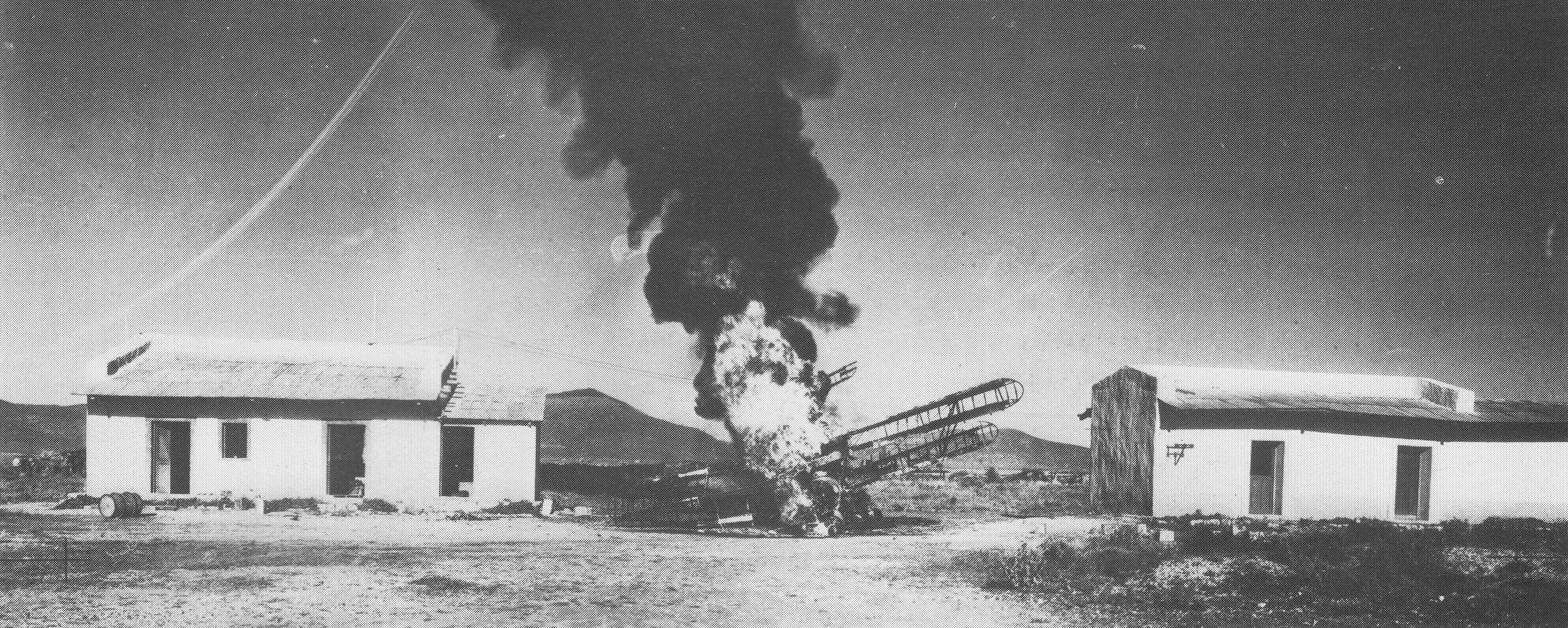
Burning Hartbeest 801 of 41 Sqn SAAF Jijigga East Africa 1941 after attack by Italian aircraft

41 Squadron was formed at AFS Waterkloof on 16 October 1940 as an army co-operation squadron equipped with the Hawker Hartbees aircraft, serving in East Africa. On 1 September 1941 the squadron received a number of Curtiss Mohawks and these were grouped into "41 Squadron Fighter Detachment" – this detachment was later transferred to 3 Squadron. The squadron remained behind in Abyssinia in 1942 when the rest of the South African forces moved into the Western Desert, with some Hurricanes being taken on strength in mid-1942.

By 1943 the squadron had been fully converted to Hurricane Mk Is and in April–May 1943 it moved from Kenya to Egypt, where it was re-equipped with Hurricane Mk IIBs. The squadron was used in a defensive role and was responsible for the air defence of central and eastern Egypt. The only offensive operation was a single fighter sweep over Crete on 23 July 1943.

In February 1944 the squadron received Spitfire Mk.IXs to supplement the Hurricanes and to permit high-altitude interceptions. All of the Hurricanes were replaced with Spitfire Mk V Cs in April 1944. By mid-April, the unit was made responsible for the air protection of Palestine and later moved to Palestine in August 1944. Its wartime role ended on 30 November 1944 when it was disbanded.

=== Later history ===
The squadron was reformed in January 1963 as the first Citizen Force part-time Army co-operation unit, flying Austers and later Cessna 185s from Grand Central Aerodrome. It was transferred back from army control to the SAAF in May 1973 when it was moved to AFB Swartkop. In February 1974 the squadron received Aermacchi AM.3 Bosbok's and in July 1976 the Aermacchi AL-60 Kudu (known as the Atlas C4M Kudu in South Africa), aircraft were added to the inventory. In 1988 the squadron was re-equipped with Cessna 208 Caravans. In 1996 Beechcraft King Airs were acquired from 21 and 35 Squadrons and a Pilatus PC-12 was added in July 1997.

Currently, the squadron is based at AFB Waterkloof and is responsible for routine air transport, air logistical support, landward airborne operations, routine air support and battlefield air support.

== Aircraft ==
Aircraft flown by 41 Squadron
Note: Aircraft type photographs may not necessarily represent aircraft of the same mark or actual aircraft belonging to the squadron.
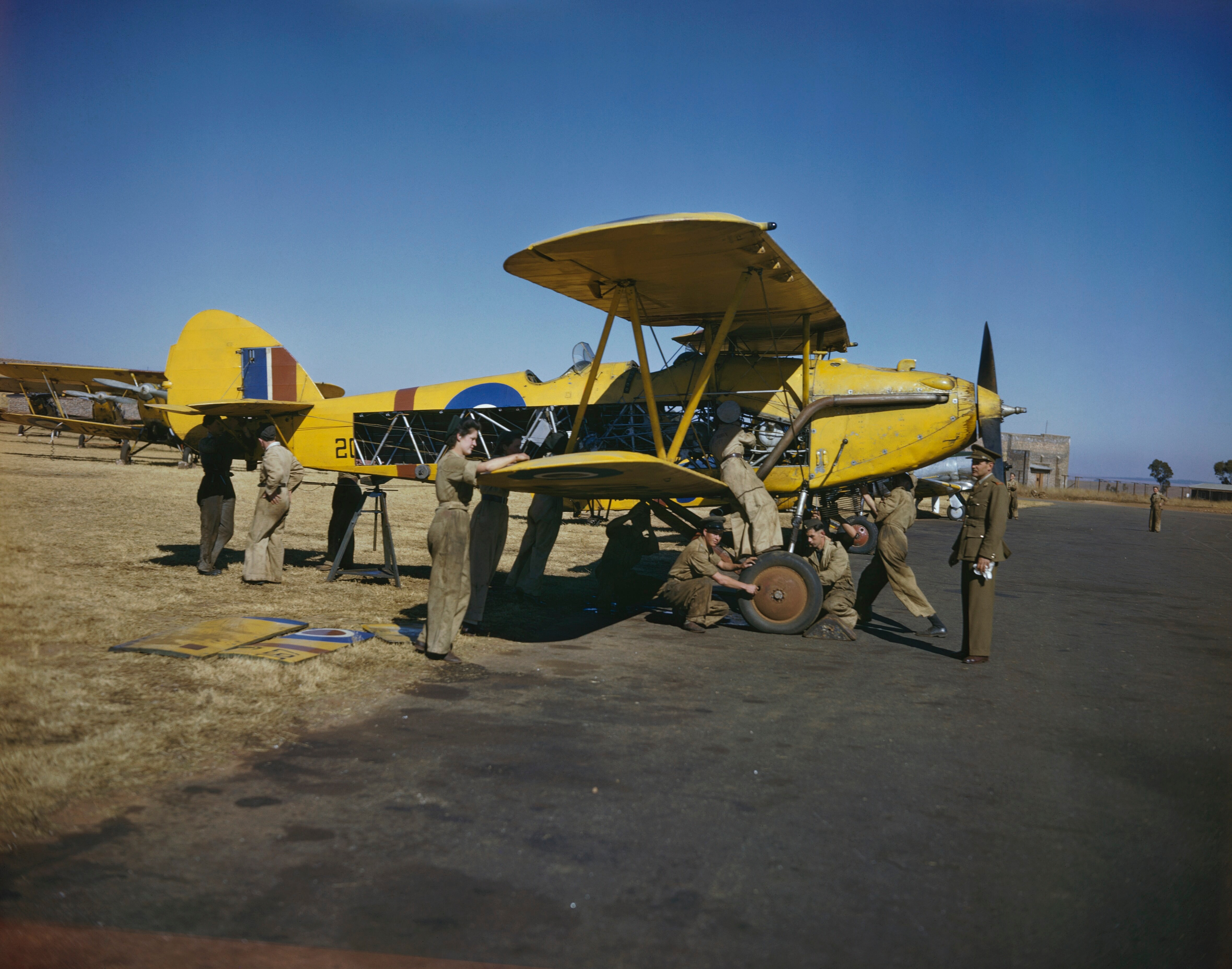
Hawker Hartbees

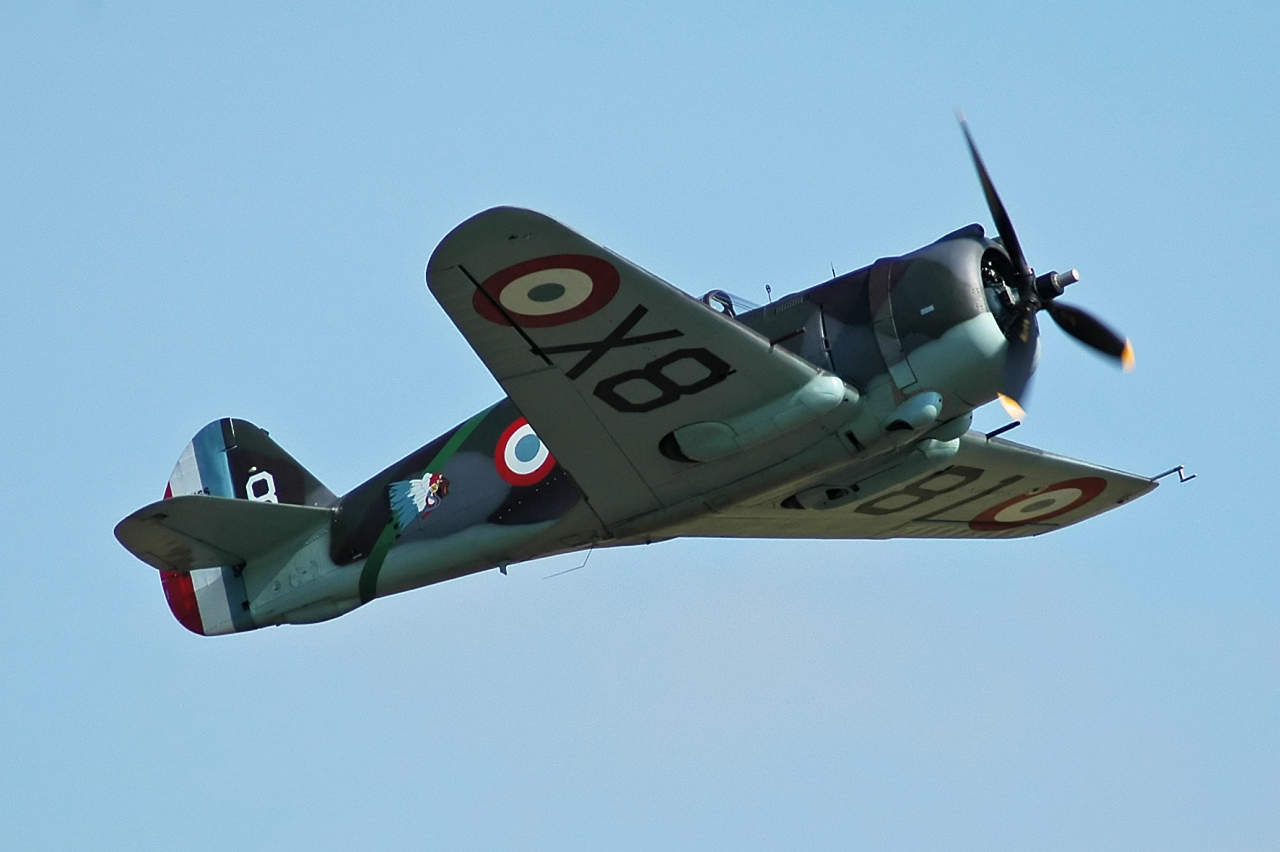
Curtiss Mohawk

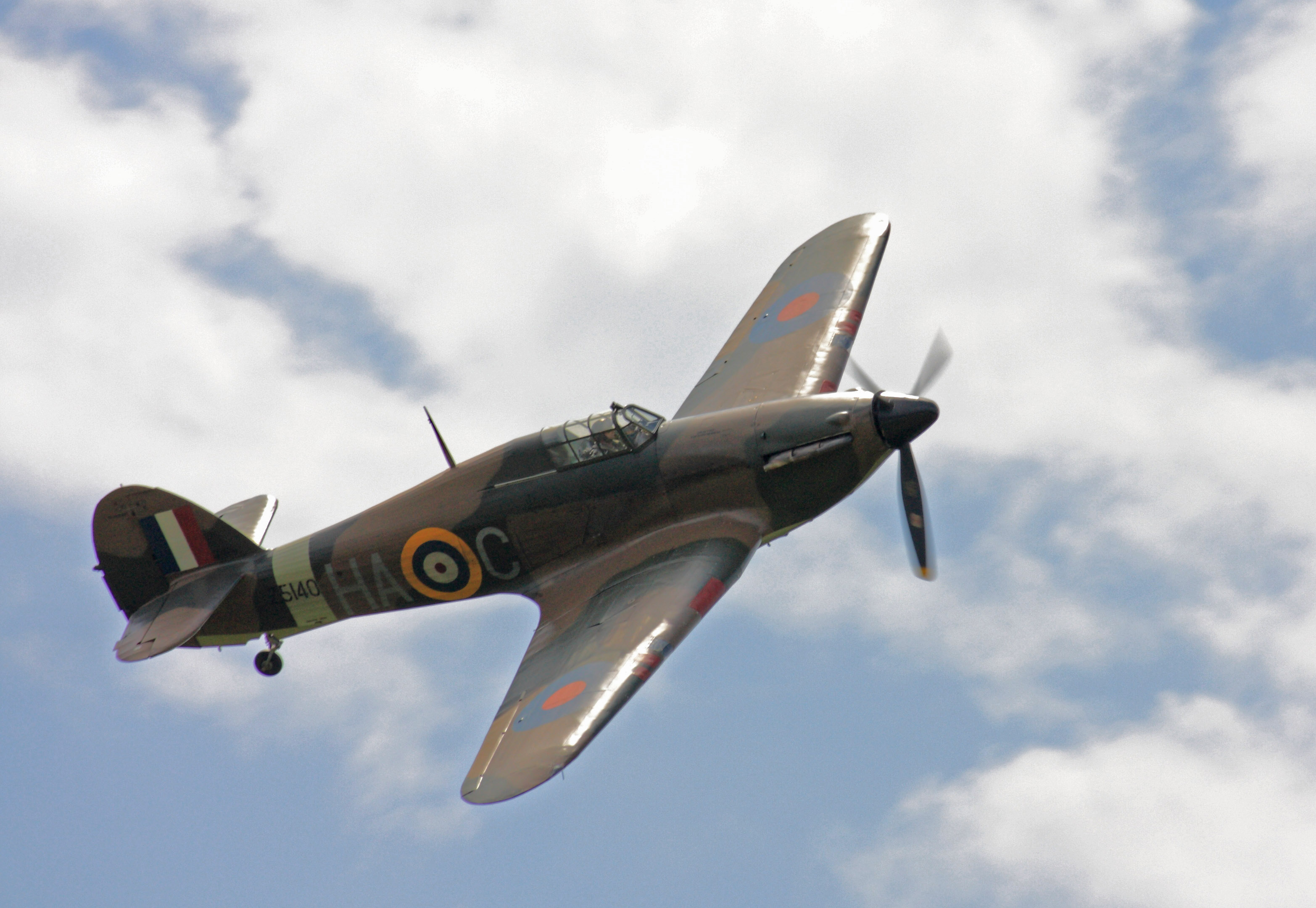
Hawker Hurricane

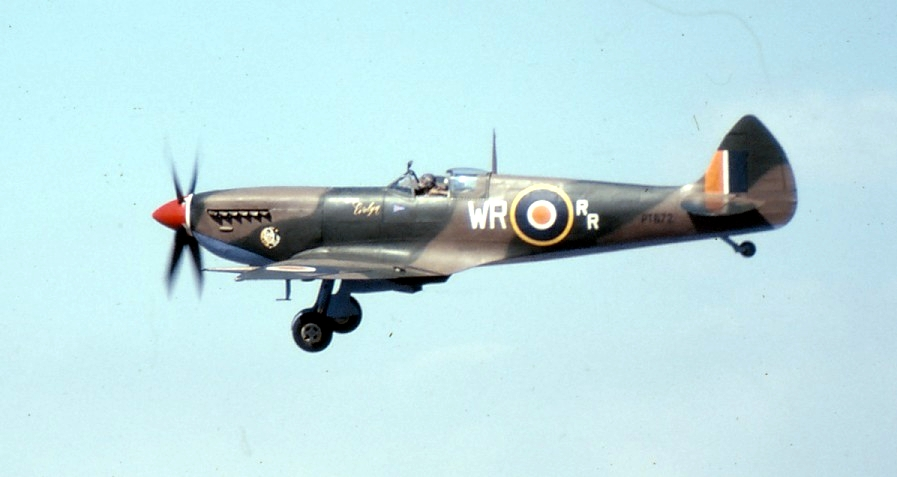
Supermarine Spitfire Mk. IX

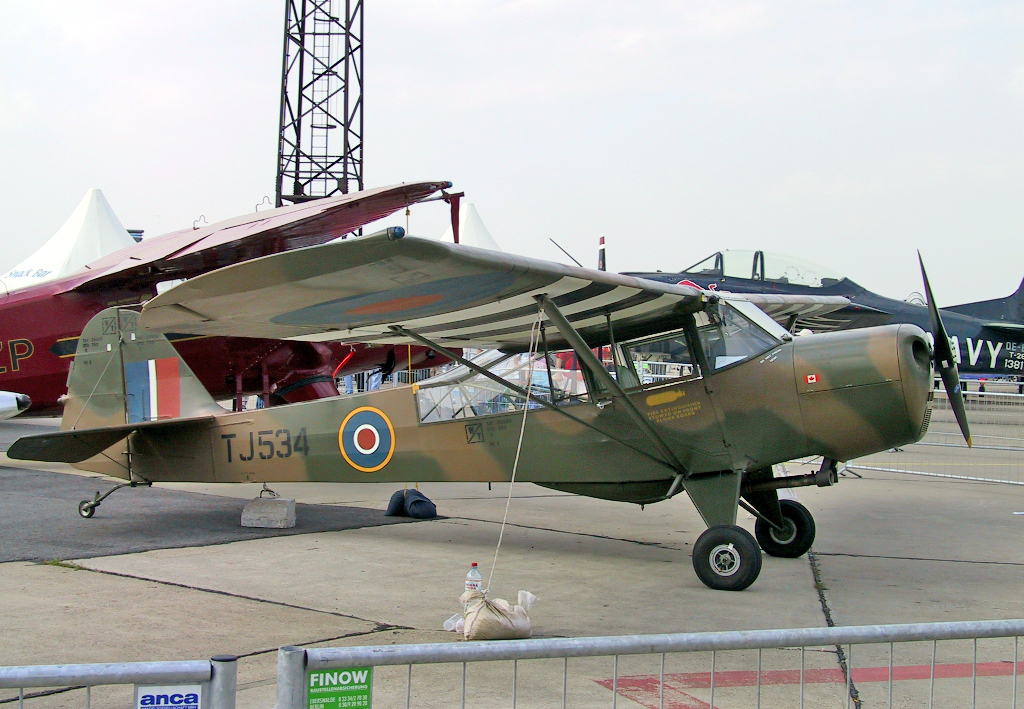
Auster Mk V

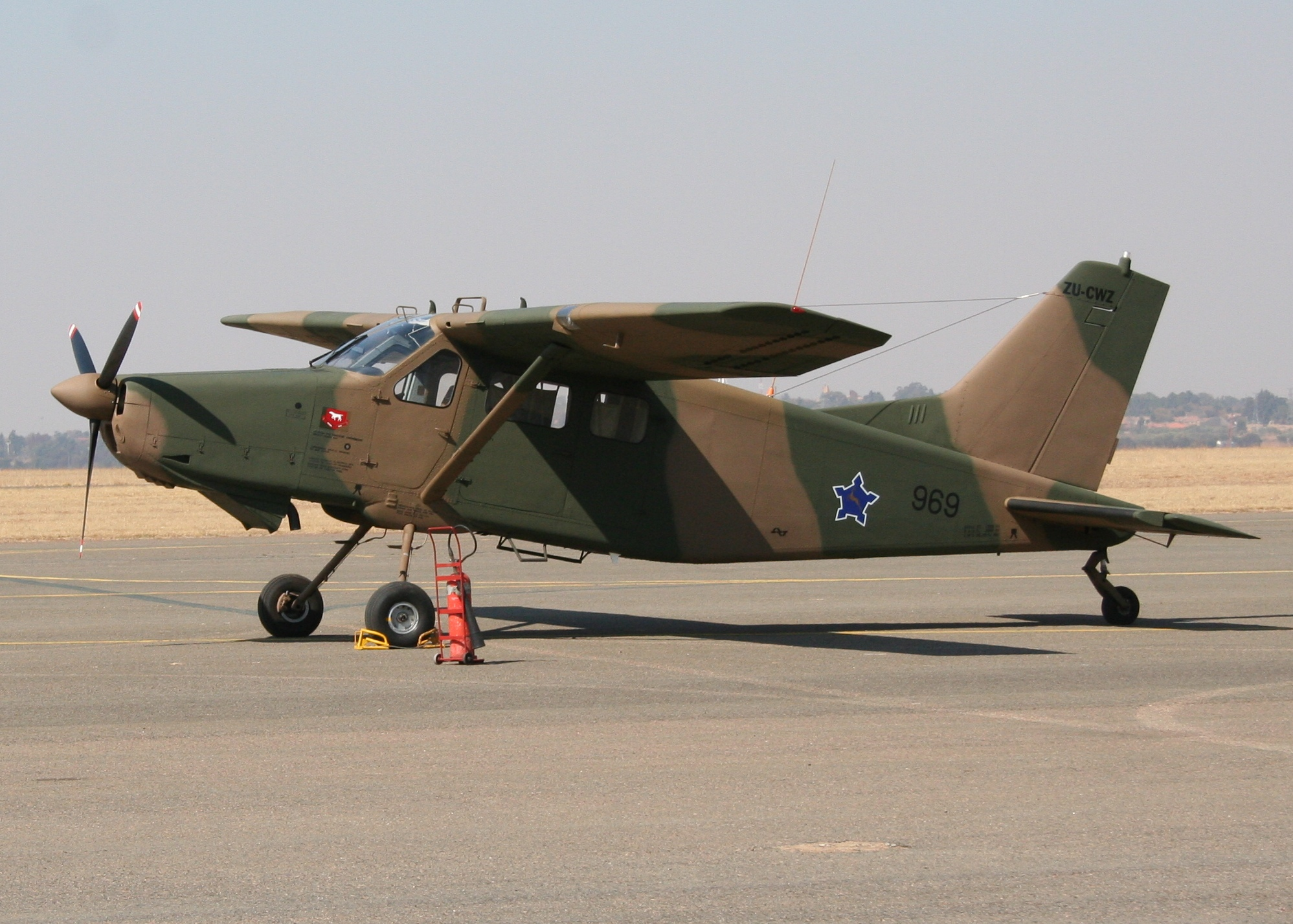
Atlas C4M Kudu

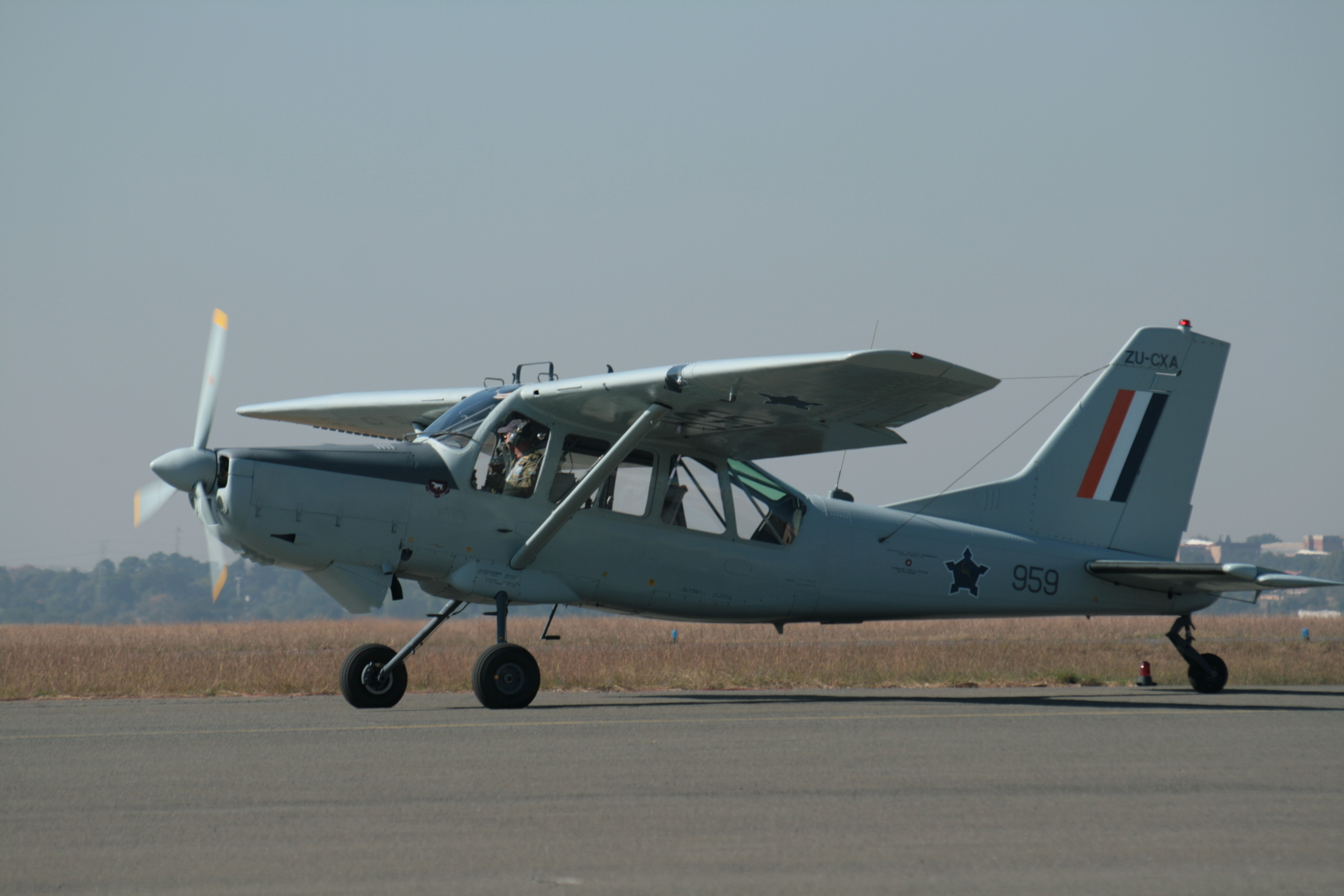
Aermacchi AM3 Bosbok

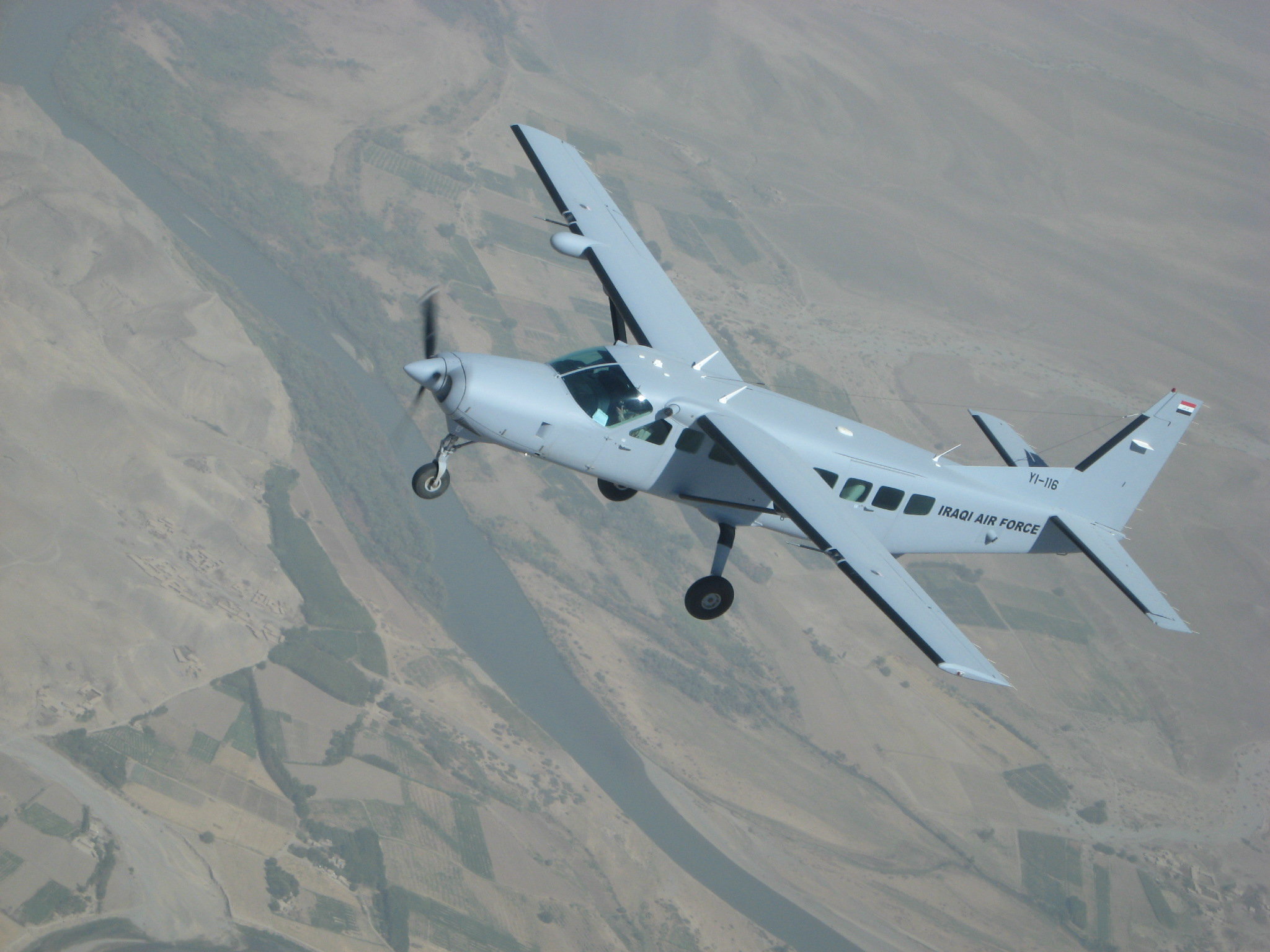
Cessna C-208 Caravan

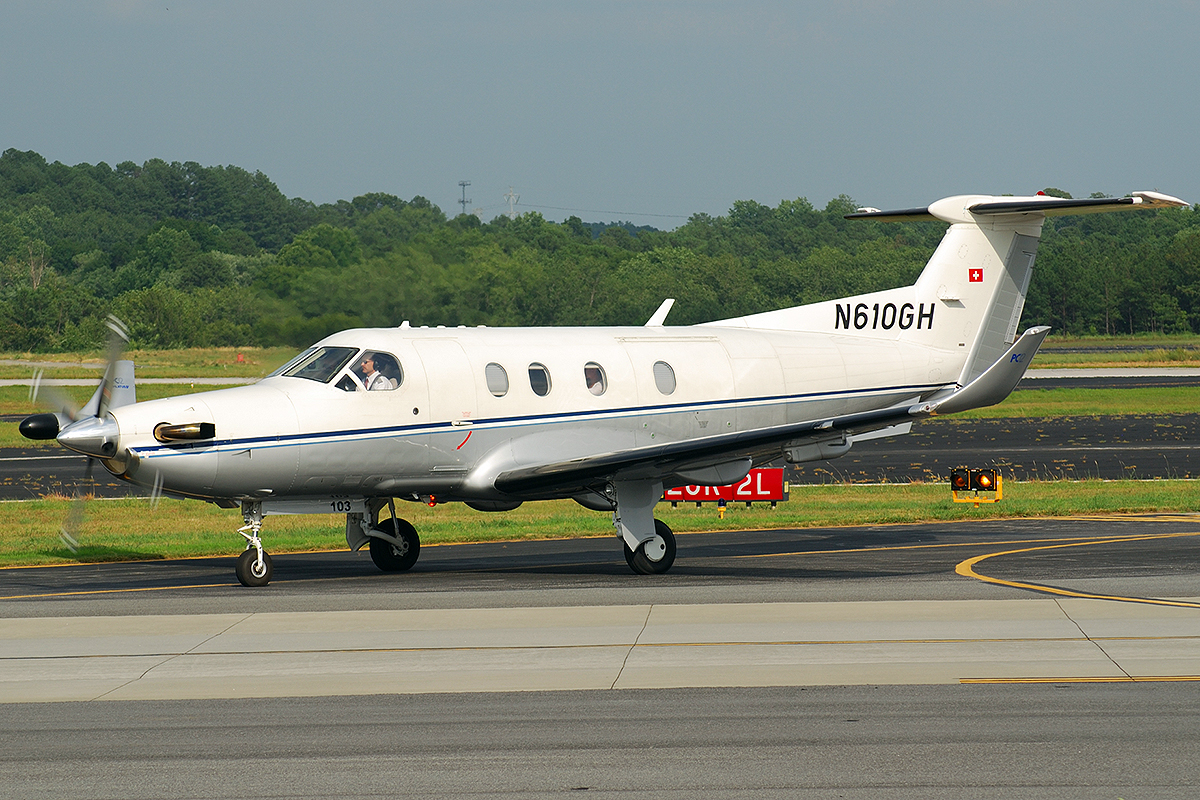
Pilatus PC-12
